= Clerk family =

Ghanaian family

- Left to right: A.W. Clerk, N.T. Clerk and C.H. Clerk
- Current region: Accra, Ghana
- Origin: Fairfield, Manchester Parish, Jamaica
- Founded: Arrival on the Gold Coast 16 or 17 April 1843, Osu, Accra; 183 years ago
- Founder: Alexander Worthy Clerk
- Members: List: Nicholas Timothy Clerk; Carl Henry Clerk; Jane Elizabeth Clerk; Theodore S. Clerk; Matilda J. Clerk; Nicholas T. Clerk; George C. Clerk; Pauline M. Clerk; Alexander A. Clerk
- Connected families: Hesse family
- Distinctions: architecture; church development; civil service; diplomacy; education; journalism; medicine; natural sciences; public administration; public health; public policy; urban planning
- Traditions: Presbyterian

The Clerk family (/klɑːrk/) is a Ghanaian historic family that produced a number of pioneering scholars and clergy on the Gold Coast. Predominantly based in the Ghanaian capital, Accra, the Clerks were traditionally Protestant Christian and affiliated to the Presbyterian Church. The Clerk family is primarily a member of the Ga coastal people of Accra and in addition, has Euro-Afro-Caribbean heritage, descending from Jamaican, German and Danish ancestry.

== History ==
The Clerk family was founded by Alexander Worthy Clerk (1820 – 1906), a Jamaican Moravian missionary who arrived in the Danish Protectorate of Christiansborg – the suburb of Osu in Accra, Gold Coast, now Ghana, on either Easter Sunday, 16 April or Easter Monday, 17 April 1843 as per differing historical accounts. Clerk was part of the first group of 24 West Indian settler missionaries who worked under the auspices of the Basel Evangelical Missionary Society of Basel, Switzerland. A. W. Clerk's hometown was Fairfield, a town located in Manchester Parish, Jamaica. In 1848, he married Pauline Hesse (1831–1909), a trader from the notable Euro-Ga Hesse family of Osu Amantra.

Alexander Clerk was also a pioneer of the precursor to the Presbyterian Church of Ghana and a leader in education in colonial Ghana, co-establishing a boarding middle school for boys, the Salem School, Osu in 1843. Furthermore, Clerk and the other West Indian missionary emigrants introduced new seedlings such as breadfruit, guava and pear to the Gold Coast food economy and their progeny was instrumental in the expansion of the science and practice of agricultural education in the country.

During the colonial era, the Clerks were among an illustrious group of thinkers, often from the coastal areas of Ghana, who flourished in the arts and sciences, spanning multiple familial generations. Outside academia, the family was also active in ecclesiastical circles and the upper echelons of government, including diplomacy. In the nineteenth and twentieth centuries, several prominent members of the Clerk family dominated various spheres of public life in Gold Coast society and later, modern Ghana, making significant and pioneering social and scientific contributions to the domestic and regional knowledge economy through the growth of architecture, church development, civil service, education, journalism, medicine, natural sciences, public administration, public health, public policy and urban planning. The Clerk family is related through marriage to several distinguished indigenous Ga families of Accra like the Adom, Nikoi, Odamtten, Ollennu, Quao and Sai families among others.

Some historically renowned Gold Coast families, mainly from southern Ghana, of Akyem, Anlo Ewe, Fante and Ga ethnicities that thrived in various intellectual pursuits within this period include the Baëta, Bartels, Brew, Casely-Hayford, Easmon, Gbeho and Ofori-Atta families. In the broader context, this era of creative ferment, marked by an outpouring of educational achievement, was a catalyst for the eventual push for the country's independence by the Gold Coast intelligentsia. Other learned persons were the Accra literati, linked by intermarriage, as well as trade and commerce along the Gold Coast, such as the Bannerman, Bruce, Hutton-Mills, Meyer, Quist, Reindorf and Vanderpuije families. Other educators such as Hall and Miller were based in the peri-urban Akan hinterland.

== Notable members ==
Notable members of the Clerk family across successive generations include:

First generation

- Alexander Worthy Clerk (1820 – 1906), a Jamaican Moravian missionary, teacher and clergyman, was the patriarch of the Clerk family of Accra.

Second generation

- Nicholas Timothy Clerk (1862 – 1961), a Basel-trained theologian and pioneering missionary, was elected the first Synod Clerk of the Presbyterian Church of the Gold Coast from 1918 to 1932. He was a founding father of the all boys' boarding high school, the Presbyterian Boys' Secondary School, established in 1938.

Third generation

- Carl Henry Clerk (1895 –1982) was an agricultural educationist, administrator, journalist, editor and church minister who served as the fourth Synod Clerk of the Presbyterian Church of the Gold Coast from 1950 to 1954. From 1960 to 1963, he was also the Editor of the Christian Messenger, established in 1883 by the Basel Mission, as the news publication of the Presbyterian Church of Ghana.
- Jane Elizabeth Clerk (1904 – 1999) was a schoolteacher and pioneer woman education administrator on the Gold Coast.
- Theodore Shealtiel Clerk (1909 – 1965) was the first formally trained, professionally certified Ghanaian architect of the Gold Coast who received the Rutland Prize from the Royal Scottish Academy in 1943. A presidential advisor to Ghana's first leader, Kwame Nkrumah, Clerk was the chief architect, town planner and the first chief executive officer (CEO) of the Tema Development Corporation, a role in which he planned, designed and developed the post-independent metropolis of Tema, the location of the largest seaport in Ghana, the Tema Harbour. He was an Associate of the Royal Institute of British Architects and the Royal Town Planning Institute. In 1964, Theodore Clerk became the first president of the first national professional society, the Ghana Institute of Architects, started in 1963, for the promotion of the architectural practice, education and accreditation in Ghana.
- Matilda Johanna Clerk (1916 – 1984) was the second Ghanaian woman and the fourth West African woman to become a medical doctor. M. J. Clerk was also the first Ghanaian woman in any field to win an academic merit scholarship for university education abroad and the first woman in Ghana and West Africa to attend graduate school and earn a postgraduate diploma. Additionally, she was the joint second Ghanaian woman and joint fifth woman in West Africa to receive a baccalaureate degree.

Fourth generation

- Nicholas Timothy Clerk (1930 – 2012) was an academic, administrator and Presbyterian minister . Between 1977 and 1982, he served as the Rector of the GIMPA, the nation's premier graduate school of public policy, public administration and governance or statecraft. He was also the vice-chairman of the Public Services Commission of Ghana and the Chairman of the Public Services Commission of Uganda from 1989 to 1990.
- George Carver Clerk (1931 – 2019) was a pioneering botanist and plant pathologist in Ghana and West Africa. A professor and later, an emeritus professor at the University of Ghana, Legon and a Fellow of the Ghana Academy of Arts and Sciences, elected in 1973, he focused his research on the ecology, mycology and phytopathology of indigenous flora in Ghana and West Africa.
- Pauline Miranda Clerk (1935 – 2013) was a civil servant, diplomat and a presidential advisor.
- Alexander Adu Clerk (born 1947) is an academic, sleep medicine specialist, psychiatrist and a Fellow of the American Academy of Sleep Medicine, who became the Director of the world's first sleep medical clinic, the Stanford Center for Sleep Sciences and Medicine from 1990 to 1998.

Fifth generation

- Nicholas Timothy Clerk, Jnr. (born 1963) is a consultant obstetrician-gynaecologist with a specialty in ambulatory gynaecology. A medical lecturer, he is a Fellow of the Royal College of Obstetricians and Gynaecologists.
- Christine Alexandra Clerk (1967 – 2018) was a physician and an epidemiologist, with a focus on malaria research and diagnostics, adolescent health and HIV in pregnant women. A clinical research scientist, she worked at public health research centres at Dodowa and Navrongo, in academia at the University of Ghana, Legon and at PATH, a global health institution in Seattle. Christine Clerk was also a Gates Malaria Partnership Scholar at the London School of Hygiene & Tropical Medicine.

== List of public memorials ==
This is a list of memorials to the Clerk family:

- C. H. Clerk Hall, Osu Presbyterian Girls’ School, Osu, Accra
- Clerk Hall, Valley View University, Oyibi, on the Dodowa-Nsawam Road, Greater Accra
- Clerk House, Presbyterian Boys' Secondary School, Legon, Accra
- Clerks Street, Osu, Accra
- Commemorative monument in front of the Anum Presbyterian Church, Anum in memory of Nicholas Timothy Clerk and other pioneering Basel missionaries who planted the Anum Presbytery
- Commemorative plaque attached to the chapel of the Grace Presbyterian Church, Nungua-North, Accra, in memory of Nicholas T. Clerk
- Commemorative plaque in the sanctuary of the Ebenezer Presbyterian Church, Osu in honour of A. W. Clerk, his son, N. T. Clerk and other Basel Mission pastors from Osu
- Commemorative tablet in the sanctuary of the Christ Presbyterian Church, Akropong, in memory of Jamaicans, A. W. Clerk, Joseph Miller, John Hall, John Rochester, James Mullings, John Walker, James Green and Antiguan, Jonas Horsford
- Fairfield House, Aburi, in memory of A. W. Clerk
- Hanover Street, Akropong, where the Caribbean Moravians originally resided
- Jamaica, a well at Aburi, dug by John Rochester in the 1850/60s, dedicated to the memory of the West Indian Moravians by the Jamaican Community in Ghana
- Mural in memory of Matilda J. Clerk at Nuffield House, Guy's Hospital, London
- N. T. Clerk Congregation, Volta Presbytery, Worawora
- N. T. Clerk Roundabout, Buem
- Nicholas Timothy Clerk Road, Worawora
- Presbyterian Day, also Ebenezer Day, Presbyterian Church of Ghana, special Sunday in the Almanac in remembrance of the Basel, West Indian and Scottish Presbyterian missionaries
- T. S. Clerk Street, between Akojo School Park and Tweduaase Primary School, Site 6, Community I, Tema
- The Rev. N. T. Clerk Memorial International School, Worawora

== See also ==
- Clerk surname
- Gold Coast Euro-Africans
