= Pauline M. Clerk =

Ghanaian diplomat (1935 – 2013)

Pauline Miranda Clerk

Personal details
- Born: 26 May 1935; Accra, Gold Coast
- Died: 25 October 2013 (aged 78); Accra, Ghana
- Relations: Alexander Worthy Clerk (great-grandfather)
- Education: Achimota College
- Occupation: Civil servant; Diplomat

Pauline Miranda Clerk (26 May 1935 – 25 October 2013) was a Ghanaian civil servant, diplomat and a presidential advisor.

== Biography ==
=== Early life and family ===
Pauline Miranda Clerk was born on 26 May 1935 in Osu, Accra to Richard Alfred Clerk, a colonial civil servant who worked on the Gold Coast and in Nigeria. Her mother was Martha Comfort Quaynor. Her siblings were Robert, Richard and Caroline. She was a fourth generation member of the historically important Clerk family of Ghana. She was the great-granddaughter of Alexander Worthy Clerk, a Jamaican Moravian missionary who arrived in the Danish Protectorate of Christiansborg, on the then Gold Coast in 1843, as part of the original group of 24 West Indian missionaries who worked under the auspices of the Basel Evangelical Missionary Society of Switzerland. A.W. Clerk was a pioneer of the Presbyterian Church of Ghana and a leader in education in colonial Ghana, co-founding a boarding middle school in Osu, the Salem School in 1843. Her paternal great-grandmother, Pauline Hesse (1831–1909) was from the Gold Coast, and had Danish, German and Ga ancestry. His great-grandaunt was Regina Hesse (1832–1898), a pioneer educator and school principal who worked with the Basel Mission on the Gold Coast.

Notable among her relations was her granduncle, Nicholas Timothy Clerk (1862–1961), a theologian and missionary who was elected the first Synod Clerk of the Presbyterian Church of the Gold Coast from 1918 to 1932. N. T. Clerk was a founding father of the all boys’ boarding high school, the Presbyterian Boys’ Secondary School established in 1938. Her uncle, Carl Henry Clerk (1895–1982) was an educator and Presbyterian minister and journalist who was elected the fourth Synod Clerk of the Presbyterian Church of the Gold Coast from 1950 to 1954 as well as the Editor of the Christian Messenger, the news bulletin of the Presbyterian Church of Ghana from 1960 to 1963. An uncle, Theodore S. Clerk (1909–1965) was the first Ghanaian architect of the Gold Coast who planned and developed the port city of Tema P. M. Clerk's aunts were Jane E. Clerk (1904–1999), a Gold Coast pioneering woman education administrator and Matilda J. Clerk (1916–1984), the second Ghanaian woman to become a physician. Her cousins were the academics Nicholas, George and Alexander Clerk.

=== Education and career ===
Pauline Clerk was educated at the Osu Presbyterian Girls’ School and Achimota College, both in Accra. She started her career at the Ghana Broadcasting Corporation and assisted in the establishment of the public broadcaster's research library.

She joined the Gold Coast Civil Service in the mid-1950s and became a foreign service officer – a professional diplomat attached to the Ministry of Foreign Affairs. She was initially assigned to the erstwhile African Affairs Secretariat located at the Ghanaian presidency, The Flagstaff House. At the Secretariat, Pauline Clerk worked with the Ghanaian diplomat, K. B. Asante, who had been appointed by Kwame Nkrumah to the head the institution. She worked as an official in the East Africa Region and was stationed in Kampala, Uganda, where she studied Swahili at Makerere University. Between 1962 and 1965, she was Ghana's diplomatic representative in Dahomey (now Benin).

Pauline Clerk was the diplomatic secretary for information and culture at the Ghanaian embassy in Paris. She served with the Ghanaian diplomatic missions in Washington, DC and London. She was also a diplomat in Togo and in the former Eastern Bloc nations of Yugoslavia and East Germany. Clerk was an independent international observer in the 1980 Ugandan general election. In the 1980s, she was appointed an advisor at the Offices of the Provisional National Defence Council (PNDC) under the leadership of Jerry John Rawlings. Upon the return to civilian rule in the early 1990s, she became a senior presidential advisor, seconded to the National Council for Women and Development (NCWD) as a consultant on women's rights and socioeconomic development issues.

== Death and funeral ==
Pauline Clerk died in Accra on 25 October 2013 of natural causes. Her funeral service was at the Ebenezer Presbyterian Church, Osu, after which her body was buried at the Osu Cemetery in Accra.
