= Alexander A. Clerk =

Ghanaian American psychiatrist and sleep specialist

Alexander Adu Clerk FAASM
- Born: 13 May 1947 (age 79); Cape Coast, Gold Coast
- Education: Achimota School; University of Ghana (MBChB); Loma Linda University
- Known for: Director, Stanford Center for Sleep Sciences and Medicine; (1990 – 1998)
- Relatives: Alexander Worthy Clerk (great-grandfather)
- Scientific career
- Fields: Psychiatry; Sleep medicine
- Institutions: Loma Linda University School of Medicine; Stanford University School of Medicine

Alexander Adu Clerk, FAASM (born 13 May 1947) is a Ghanaian American academic, psychiatrist and sleep medicine specialist who was the Director of the world's first sleep medical clinic, the Stanford Center for Sleep Sciences and Medicine from 1990 to 1998. Clerk is also a Fellow of the American Academy of Sleep Medicine.

== Early life and family ==
Alexander Adu Clerk was born in Cape Coast in the Central Region, Gold Coast in 1947 to Charles Andrew Clerk (c. 1891 – 1977), a civil servant who had done administrative stints in the northern Nigerian cities of Kano and Zaria. C. A. Clerk was also a colporteur of the Hansen Road Seventh-Day Adventist Church in Accra. His mother was Dorothy Esi Mensima Clerk, née Holdbrook, of Cape Coast and Ga Mashie. His paternal grandfather, Charles Emmanuel Clerk (died 14 November 1938) worked in the Gold Coast Civil Service as an interpreter and Secretary to the Governor, and earlier, he was a newspaper publisher in Nigeria. Alexander A. Clerk is a fourth generation descendant of the historically important Clerk family. He is a great-grandson of Alexander Worthy Clerk, a Jamaican Moravian missionary who arrived in the Danish Protectorate of Christiansborg (now the suburb of Osu) in 1843, as part of the original group of 24 West Indian missionaries who worked under the auspices of the Basel Evangelical Missionary Society of Basel, Switzerland. A.W. Clerk was a pioneer of the Presbyterian Church of Ghana and a leader in education in colonial Ghana, co-founding a boarding middle school in Osu, the Salem School in 1843. His paternal great-grandmother, Pauline Hesse (1831–1909) was from the Gold Coast, and of Danish, German and Ga-Dangme heritage. His great-grandaunt was Regina Hesse (1832 –1898), a pioneer educator and school principal who worked with the Basel Mission on the Gold Coast. His granduncle, Nicholas Timothy Clerk (1862 – 1961), a Basel-trained theologian was elected the first Synod Clerk of the Presbyterian Church of the Gold Coast from 1918 to 1932 and a founding father of the all boys’ boarding high school, the Presbyterian Boys’ Secondary School established in 1938.

His uncle, Carl Henry Clerk (1895 – 1982), an educator and Presbyterian minister was elected the fourth Synod Clerk of the Presbyterian Church of the Gold Coast from 1950 to 1954 and served as the Editor of the Christian Messenger newspaper from 1960 to 1963. Another uncle, Theodore S. Clerk (1909 – 1965) was the first Ghanaian architect who planned and developed the harbour metropolis, Tema. A. A. Clerk's aunts were Jane E. Clerk (1904 – 1999), a woman pioneer in education administration and Matilda J. Clerk (1916 – 1984), the second Ghanaian woman to become a physician.

His cousin, Nicholas T. Clerk (1930 – 2012), served as the Rector of the Ghana Institute of Management and Public Administration (GIMPA), the vice-chairman of the Public Services Commission of Ghana and the Chairman of the Public Services Commission of Uganda from 1989 to 1990. Another cousin, George C. Clerk (1931–2019) was a pioneering botanist. Pauline M. Clerk (1935 - 2013), a diplomat and presidential advisor, was also his cousin.

== Education and training ==
A. A. Clerk had his early education at Presbyterian and Seventh-day Adventist schools in Osu and Bekwai in the Greater Accra and Ashanti Regions respectively. After completing his secondary education at Achimota School, he studied medicine at the University of Ghana Medical School, graduating in 1975. He completed a residency in psychiatry at the Loma Linda University School of Medicine. For clinical and fellowship training in sleep medicine, he attended the Stanford University School of Medicine.

== Career ==
Between 1975 and 1978, Clerk was a medical officer at the Effia-Nkwantah Hospital, Sekondi in Ghana's Western Region. Later, he became an assistant professor of psychiatry at the Loma Linda University School of Medicine. He was also an attending physician and was appointed the Chief Director of the Outpatient Psychiatric Clinic and the Mental Hygiene Clinic at the Loma Linda Veteran Administration Hospital from 1984 to 1989. A. A. Clerk was also a consulting psychiatrist with the Riverside County Mental Health Department. Clerk was a clinical assistant professor and later, a clinical associate professor of psychiatry at the Stanford University School of Medicine. He was an attending physician and associate director of the Stanford Sleep Disorders Clinic at Stanford University Medical Center, part of the Stanford Health Care system, rising to become the Director of the world's first sleep medical clinic, the Stanford Center for Sleep Sciences and Medicine from 1990 to 1998 where he was responsible for clinical operations, sleep research and supervised training of other medical specialists. Over the course of his career, he has published numerous scientific articles, book chapters and abstracts pertaining to the science of sleep.

Clerk has done medical outreach work in the United States, Canada, Côte d'Ivoire and his native Ghana. Alexander Clerk is a founding member and Western Region Director of the Ghana Physicians and Surgeons Foundation based in New York City to promote specialist training, professional development in medicine and associated fields in Ghana. He is a member of the Fellowship Training Committee of the American Academy of Sleep Medicine. He has been board certified by the American Board of Sleep Medicine and is a Diplomate of the American Board of Psychiatry and Neurology and a Fellow of the American Academy of Sleep Medicine. Clerk has also been affiliated to the Kaiser Permanente San Jose Medical Center. He served as the Director of Sleep Medicine Services, an affiliate of the O'Connor Health Center based in San Jose, California.

== Personal life ==
Alexander A. Clerk is married to Cynthia V. Clerk (née Oblitey) with three children, Sandra, Andrew and Dorothy.And two grandchildren Chase And Alex Jr. His siblings are the late Major (retired) A. N. Clerk, a military officer; Patrick A. Clerk, a dentist; James S. Clerk, an artist educator and Ellen, a nurse.

Alexander Clerk is the President of the Valley View University Foundation, established to promote academic excellence and scholarship at the Valley View University located in Oyibi, on the Dodowa-Nsawam Road In Ghana. A residential hall at the Valley View University is named Clerk Hall in honour of his family. Clerk also served as the President of the Pacific Ghanaian Adventist Fellowship (PaGAF).

== Selected works ==
=== Abstracts ===
- Guilleminault, C.; Stoohs, R.; Maistros, P.; Clerk A. (1991) “Idiopathic hypersomnia revisited; the unknown upper airway resistance syndrome.” Sleep Research: 20: 251
- Valencia-Flores M.; Bliwise, D.; Guilleminault, C.; Rhodes, N.; Clerk A. (1992) “Gender differences in sleep architecture in apnea syndrome.” Sleep Research: 21: 271
- Dantz, B.; Edgar, E.M.; Clerk, A.; Keenan, S.; Seidel W.F.; Dement, W.C. (1992) “Narcoleptics on a 90 minute day: Circadian variations in sleep latencies and tympanic temperature.” Sleep Research: 21: 369
- Clerk, A; Duncan, S.; Guilleminault, C. (1992), “Resistance perception during wakefulness in subjects with partial or complete upper airway obstruction during sleep.” Sleep Research: 21: 186

=== Book chapters ===
- Christian Guilleminault, Riccardo Stoohs, Alex Clerk, Mindy Cetel, Paul Maistros (1993). “The Upper Airway Resistance Syndrome, Sleep Apnea and Rhonchopathy.” Togawa K, Katayama S, Hisihikawa Y, Ohta Y, Horie T (eds.): Basel: Karger, pp. 62–65
- Alex Clerk, Vincent Zarcone. (1996) “Impotence: Sleep Clinic Assessment. Treating Sexual Disorders.” Randolph S. Charltoon (ed): Publisher Jossey Bass, San Francisco, CA, Chapter 4, pp. 123–125

== Bibliography ==
=== Further reading ===
==== Journal publications ====
- Valencia-Flores, M.; Bliwise, D; Guilleminault, C.; Rhodes, N.; Clerk A. (1992): “Gender differences in sleep architecture in sleep apnea syndrome.” Journal of Sleep Research 1, 51-53
- Guilleminault, C.; Stoohs, R.; Clerk, A.; Simmons, J.; Labanowski, M. (1992): “From obstructive sleep apnea syndrome to upper airway resistance syndrome: Consistency of daytime sleepiness.” Sleep 15:S13-S16
- Guilleminault, C.; Clerk, A.; Stoohs, R. (1993): “Daytime somnolence: Therapeutic approaches.” Clinical Neurophysiology 23, 23-33
- Guilleminault, C.; Clerk, A.; Labanowski, M.; Simmon, J.; Stoohs, R. (1993): “Cardiac Failure and Benzodiazepines.” Sleep 16 (6):524-528
- Guilleminault, C.; Stoohs, R.; Labanowski, M.; Simmons, J.; Clerk, A. (1993): “Cardiac Failure, snoring, ventricular arrhythmias and nasal bilevel positive pressure ventilation.” Sleep 16: S139- S140
- Guilleminault, C.; Stoohs R.; Clerk, A., Simmons J., Labanowski M. (1993): “Excessive daytime somnolence in women with abnormal respiratory efforts during sleep.” Sleep 16:S137-S138
- Guilleminault, C.; Stoohs, R.; Clerk, A.; Cetel M., Maistros P. (1993): “A cause of excessive daytime sleepiness: The upper airway resistance syndrome.” Chest 104 (3): 781-787
- Clerk, A.; Duncan, S.; Guilleminault, C. (1994): “Load detection in subjects with sleep-induced upper airway obstruction.” Am J. Respir. Crit. Care Med 149:727-730
- Riley, R.W.; Powell, N.B., Guilleminault, C.; Clerk, A.: “Obstructive sleep apnea and the hyoid bone – a revised surgical procedure.” Otolaryngol. Head Neck Surgery
- Riley, R.W.; Powell N.B.; Guilleminault, C.; Clerk A.; Troell, R. (1995): “Obstructive Sleep Apnea Syndrome: Trends in Therapy of a Major Public Health Problem.” West I Med: 143-8
- Kushida, C.; Clerk, A.; Kirsch, C.; Hotson, J.; Guilleminault, C. (1995): “Prolonged Confusion With Nocturnal Wandering Arising From NREM and REM Sleep: A Case Report.” Sleep: 757-64
- Guilleminault, C.; Pelayo, R.; Clerk, A.; Leger, D.; Bocian, R. (1995): “Home Nasal Continuous Positive Airway Pressure in Infants with Sleep-Disordered Breathing.” Journal of Pediatrics: 905-12.
- Guilleminault, C.; Clerk, A.; Black, J. et al. (1995) "Nondrug Treatment Trials in Psychophysiologic Insomnia". Archives of Internal Medicine. 155 (8) 838-844
- Newman, J. P.; Clerk, A.; Moore, M.; Utley, D. S.; Terris, D. J. (1996). "Recognition and Surgical Management of the Upper Airway Resistance Syndrome". The Laryngoscope. 106 (9): 1089–1093
- Guilleminault, C; Stoohs, R; Kim, Y; Chervin, R; Black, J; Clerk, A. (1995) “Upper Airway sleep-disordered breathing in women.” Ann Int Med: 122 (7):493-501
- Guilleminault, C.; Pelayo, R.; Leger, D.; Clerk, A. (1996), Bocian, R. C. “Recognition of sleep-disordered breathing in children.” Pediatrics: 871-82
- Valencia-Flores, M.; Bliwise, D. L.; Guilleminault, C.; Cilveti, R.; Clerk, A. (1996) “Cognitive function in patients with sleep apnea after acute nocturnal nasal continuous positive airway pressure (CPAP) treatment: sleepiness and hypoxemia effects.” J Clin. Exp. Neuropsychology: 197-210
- Terris, D. J.; Clerk, A.; Norbash, A. M.; Troell, R. J. (1996). "Characterization of postoperative edema following laser-assisted uvulopalatoplasty using MRI and polysomnography: implications for the outpatient treatment of obstructive sleep apnea syndrome." The Laryngoscope. 106 (2 Pt 1): 124–128
- Utley, D. S.; Shin, E. J.; Clerk, A.; Terris, D. J. (1997). "A Cost-Effective and Rational Surgical Approach to Patients With Snoring, Upper Airway Resistance Syndrome, or Obstructive Sleep Apnea Syndrome". The Laryngoscope. 107 (6): 726–734
