= Nicholas T. Clerk =

Ghanaian academic, administrator and minister (1930–2012)

The Rev. Dr. Nicholas Timothy Clerk
- Nicholas T. Clerk in 2000

4th Rector of the Ghana Institute of Management and Public Administration
- In office 1977–1982
- Preceded by: James Nti
- Succeeded by: R. K. O. Djang

Personal details
- Born: 3 March 1930 Adawso, Gold Coast
- Died: 22 September 2012 (aged 82) Accra, Ghana
- Education: List: Presbyterian Boys' Secondary School; Presbyterian Training College, Akropong; University College of Ghana University College, Leicester University of London (BA, PGCE); University of Southern California (MPA, DPA); Trinity Theological Seminary, Legon (Dipl.-Theol.)
- Known for: Contributions to public sector performance and productivity improvement in Africa

Academic background
- Thesis: Bureaucracy And The One-Party State: Politics And Administrative Transformation In Ghana (1972)
- Doctoral advisor: Gilbert Byron Siegel
- Other advisors: William Bruce Storm; Louis B. Bishop

Academic work
- Discipline: Public administration; Public policy; Political science
- Institutions: List: Ghana Institute of Management and Public Administration; Kwame Nkrumah University of Science and Technology; Trinity Theological Seminary, Legon

Ecclesiastical career
- Church: Presbyterian Church of Ghana
- Ordained: November 1993

Nicholas Timothy Clerk (3 March 1930 – 22 September 2012) was a Ghanaian academic, administrator and Presbyterian minister who served as the Rector of the Ghana Institute of Management and Public Administration (GIMPA) from 1977 to 1982. He was also the vice-chairman of the Public Services Commission of Ghana. Clerk chaired the Public Services Commission of Uganda from 1989 to 1990.

== Early life and family ==
Nicholas Timothy Clerk was born on 3 March 1930 in Adawso in the Eastern Region of Ghana. His father, Carl Henry Clerk (1895–1982), an agricultural educator, journalist, editor and Presbyterian minister, was the fourth Synod Clerk of the Presbyterian Church of the Gold Coast from 1950 to 1954 and the Editor of the Christian Messenger, the newspaper of the Presbyterian Church of Ghana from 1960 to 1963. Nicholas Clerk's mother, Martha Ayorkor Quao (1911–1989) hailed from La and Ga-Mashie. She was the granddaughter of Nii Ngleshie Addy I, the eldest son of Nii Tetteh Tsuru I, the founder and ruler of the Otuopai Clan, a royal house in Ga Mashie.

Nicholas Timothy Clerk was a fourth generation member of the historically important Clerk family. His paternal great-grandfather, Alexander Worthy Clerk (1820–1906), a Jamaican Moravian missionary arrived in the Danish Protectorate of Christiansborg (now the suburb of Osu) in Accra on the Gold Coast in 1843, as part of the original group of 24 West Indian missionaries who worked under the auspices of the Basel Evangelical Missionary Society of Basel, Switzerland. A.W. Clerk co-founded a boarding middle school, the Salem School in 1843. His paternal great-grandmother, Pauline Hesse (1831–1909) was of Danish, Ga and German heritage. His great-grandaunt was Regina Hesse (1832 –1898), a pioneer educator and school principal who worked with the Basel Mission on the Gold Coast. His grandfather, Nicholas Timothy Clerk (1862 –1961), a theologian was the first Synod Clerk of the Presbyterian Church of the Gold Coast from 1918 to 1932 and a founding father of the all boys’ boarding high school, the Presbyterian Boys’ Secondary School, established in 1938. His grandmother, Anna Alice Meyer (1873–1934) was of Ga-Danish descent.

His uncle, Theodore S. Clerk (1909 -1965), was the first Ghanaian architect of the Gold Coast who planned and developed the port city of Tema. His aunts were Jane E. Clerk (1904–1999), a female education administration pioneer and Matilda J. Clerk (1916–1984), the second Ghanaian woman to become a medical doctor. He was the cousin of Pauline M. Clerk (1935 - 2013), a diplomat and a presidential advisor and Alexander Adu Clerk (born 1947), a sleep medicine specialist and psychiatrist His granduncle, Emmanuel Charles Quist (1880–1959), a barrister and judge, became the first African President of the Legislative Council from 1949 to 1951, Speaker of the National Assembly of the Gold Coast from 1951 to 1957, and Speaker of the National Assembly of Ghana from March 1957 to November 1957.

Maternally, Clerk's uncle was the barrister and judge, Nii Amaa Ollennu (1906–1986), elected the Speaker of the Parliament of Ghana during the Second Republic as well as serving as the Chairman of the Presidential Commission and acting President of Ghana from 7 August 1970 to 31 August 1970. His other maternal uncle was Nathan Quao (1915–2005), a diplomat, educationist and public servant who became a presidential advisor to the governments of several Heads of State of Ghana. In addition, his first cousin was an economist and diplomat, Amon Nikoi (1930–2002), the Governor of the Bank of Ghana from 1973 to 1977 and Finance minister from 1979 to 1981.

== Education and training ==
He had his primary education at Presbyterian schools at Kpong, Odumase Krobo, Somanya and Osu according to the teaching postings of his father. He attended the boys' middle boarding school, the Salem School at Osu from 1942 to 1945. He had his secondary education at the Presbyterian Boys' Secondary School, Odumase-Krobo where he was elected the Senior Prefect in 1949. He received theology and pedagogy training at the Presbyterian Training College, Akropong, originally named, the Basel Mission Seminary, Akropong. The college was founded by the Basel Mission in 1848 as the second oldest higher educational institution in early modern West Africa after Fourah Bay College which was established in 1827. He won a colonial scholarship to study English Language and Literature at the University College, Leicester, then part of the University of London external system, receiving his honours bachelor's degree in 1955. To qualify as an education officer, he obtained his professional certification, a Postgraduate Certificate in Education, from the Institute of Education at the University College of Ghana, also an affiliate of the University of London external system at the time. He later attended the University of Southern California on a fellowship and obtained a master's degree and a doctorate in public administration. He also earned a diploma in theology from the Trinity Theological Seminary, Legon and was ordained a Presbyterian minister.

== Career ==
=== Academia ===
In his early career, he taught English Language and Literature at his alma mater, the Presbyterian Boys Secondary School, Odumase-Krobo, the Government Training College at Peki and Tamale and at the Department of Liberal Arts at the Kwame Nkrumah University of Science and Technology. He was later recruited as a lecturer in public policy, administration and management at the then newly established Ghana Institute of Management and Public Administration (GIMPA), Greenhill, Legon in 1962, and rose through the ranks to become the Rector of the institute from 1977 to 1982. The location of GIMPA, "Greenhill", was named by Clerk. The name, "Greenhill", is a reference to the lush greenery and hilly topography of the main campus, as well as its location in Legon which was historically on the periphery of the Ghanaian capital, Accra. Previously known as the Institute of Public Administration, the school was established in 1961 by the Government of Ghana with financial backing from the United Nations Special Fund Project, for the professional training of the country's civil servants. Today, GIMPA is the country's principal school of public policy, public administration and governance. Clerk served on the Ghana Education Service Council. He was also a guest lecturer at the School of Administration (now the University of Ghana Business School); the Department of Political Science at the University of Ghana; the Ghana Police College; the Ghana Military Academy and the Armed Forces Staff College.

=== Public service ===
In 1982, he was reassigned by the PNDC government to the Public Services Commission of Ghana as a Commissioner and later became the de facto vice-chairman. Between 1989 and 1990, he was appointed by the United Nations Development Programme as a Chief Technical Advisor on Administrative Reforms and the Chairman of the Public Services Commission of Uganda, a role in which he led the review, reorganisation and reform of the Ugandan public service through statecraft. Furthermore, he performed similar roles in his capacity as a public sector, management and health administration consultant in other African countries including Botswana, Kenya, Liberia, Morocco, Nigeria, Sierra Leone, Tanzania and The Gambia.

=== Church work ===
Clerk worked with the Presbyterian Church of Ghana in a senior administrative capacity as the Director of Administration and Human Resource Management at its headquarters in Accra and was also a lecturer at the Trinity Theological Seminary, Legon where he taught church management and administration courses. Moreover, he was the Chairperson of the Missions and Monuments Committee of the Presbyterian Church of Ghana. Earlier in his pastoral career, he had a stint as an associate minister at the Ebenezer Presbyterian Church, Osu. For a long time, he was the minister-in-charge of the Grace Presbyterian Church, Nungua North in Accra. Additionally, Nicholas Clerk sat on the school board of the Presbyterian Boys’ Secondary School and was active in the alumni association.

== Personal life ==
Clerk was married and had six children: Carl, Martha, Nicholas Jnr., Pauline, Christine and Caroline, with careers in architecture, corporate management, medicine, finance, public health and nonprofits. His younger brother was the plant pathologist, George C. Clerk (1931–2019). N. T. Clerk was also a trained pianist and a flautist.

== Death and funeral ==
Nicholas Clerk died on 22 September 2012 of natural causes at the Korle-Bu Teaching Hospital. His funeral service was held at the Ebenezer Presbyterian Church, Osu after which his remains were buried at the Basel Mission Cemetery in Osu, Accra.

=== Legacy and memorial ===
At the dedication of its chapel in 2019, the Grace Presbyterian Church, Nungua-North unveiled a memorial plaque in honour of Nicholas T. Clerk.

== Selected works ==
- Clerk, N. T. (1972) Bureaucracy and the One-party State: Politics and Administrative Transformation in Ghana
- Clerk, N. T. & Dabi-Dankwa, S.N.O. (1988) Half a century of secondary school education by the Presbyterian Church : the story of Presbyterian Boys' Secondary School, Odumase Krobo / Legon golden jubilee, 1938–1988
- Clerk, N. T. (1990) Report of the Public Service Review and Reorganization Commission, 1989–1990 / Vol. 1, Main report. Entebbe: Ministry of Public Service and Cabinet Affairs
