= George C. Clerk =

Ghanaian botanist and plant pathologist (1931–2019)

George Carver Clerk FGA
- G. C. Clerk in 2011
- Born: 29 July 1931; Accra, Gold Coast
- Died: 2 May 2019 (aged 87); Accra, Ghana
- Education: Presbyterian Boys' Secondary School; University College of the Gold Coast University of London (BSc); University of Bristol; Imperial College London (PhD - DIC)
- Known for: First plant pathologist and mycologist in West Africa; Contributions to science education and phytopathology
- Awards: Fulbright Scholar (1973); Ghana Book Award (1982)
- Scientific career
- Fields: Botany; Ecology; Mycology; Plant pathology
- Workplaces: University of Ghana, Legon; University of Port Harcourt
- Thesis: Studies on the survival and germination of conidia of three entomogenous fungi (1963)
- Doctoral advisor: Michael Francis Madelin
- Other academic advisors: Ronald Karslake Starr Wood
- Doctoral students: Christine Amoako-Nuamah
- Other notable students: George Tawia Odamtten

George Carver Clerk, FGA (29 July 1931 – 2 May 2019) was a Ghanaian botanist and plant pathologist. A professor and later, an emeritus professor at the University of Ghana, Legon, he also focused his research on West African mycology and ecology. Clerk, along with his academic contemporary Ebenezer Laing (1931–2015), was one of Ghana's earliest practitioners of botany as a scientific discipline, in addition to his pioneering role as a plant pathologist in West Africa. In 1973, G. C. Clerk became a Fellow of the Ghana Academy of Arts and Sciences.

== Early life and family ==
George Clerk was born on 29 July 1931 in Accra, Gold Coast. His father, Carl Henry Clerk (1895–1982), an agricultural educator, journalist and Presbyterian minister was elected the fourth Synod Clerk of the Presbyterian Church of the Gold Coast from 1950 to 1954 and the Editor of the Christian Messenger, the newspaper of the Presbyterian Church of Ghana from 1960 to 1963. His mother, Martha Ayorkor Quao (1911–1989) was from La and Ga-Mashie. Quao's maternal grandfather was Nii Ngleshie Addy I, the first son of Nii Tetteh Tsuru I, the founder and ruler of the Otuopai Clan, a royal house in Ga Mashie. G. C. Clerk's father who had earlier studied agricultural science at Tuskegee University, incidentally named him after the American botanist, George Washington Carver, whose works the older Clerk had studied at the institute, perhaps a foreshadowing of the infant George's future career path.

George C. Clerk belonged to the historically notable Clerk family. His paternal great-grandfather, Alexander Worthy Clerk (1820–1906), a Jamaican Moravian educator arrived in the Danish Protectorate of Christiansborg, now Osu, in Accra in 1843, as part of the original group of 24 West Indians employed by the Swiss-based Basel Evangelical Missionary Society. A. W. Clerk co-established a boys' middle boarding school, the Salem School in 1843. His paternal great-grandmother, Pauline Hesse (1831–1909) was from the Gold Coast, and was of Euro-Ga heritage. His great-grandaunt was Regina Hesse (1832–1898), a pioneer educator. His grandfather, Nicholas Timothy Clerk (1862–1961), a theologian, was the first Synod Clerk of the Presbyterian Church of the Gold Coast from 1918 to 1932, and a co-founder of the Presbyterian Boys’ Secondary School, established in 1938. His grandmother, Anna Alice Meyer (1873–1934) was also a Euro-African.

His uncle, Theodore S. Clerk (1909–1965) was the first Ghanaian architect and planned the port city, Tema. G. C. Clerk's aunts were Jane E. Clerk (1904–1999), a pioneer education administrator and Matilda J. Clerk (1916–1984), the second Ghanaian woman in orthodox-medicine. Pauline M. Clerk (1935 - 2013), a diplomat and presidential advisor, was his cousin, as was Alexander Adu Clerk (born 1947), a sleep medicine specialist and psychiatrist. George Clerk's granduncle was Emmanuel Charles Quist (1880–1959), a barrister and judge who became the first African President of the Legislative Council from 1949 to 1951, Speaker of the National Assembly of the Gold Coast from 1951 to 1957, and Speaker of the National Assembly of Ghana from March 1957 to November 1957.

Clerk's maternal uncle was the jurist and judge, Nii Amaa Ollennu (1906–1986), elected the Speaker of the Parliament of Ghana during the Second Republic as well as serving as the Chairman of the Presidential Commission and acting President of Ghana from 7 August 1970 to 31 August 1970. His uncle was Nathan Quao (1915–2005), a diplomat, educationist and public servant who doubled as a presidential advisor to several Heads of State of Ghana. Moreover, his first cousin was the economist and diplomat, Amon Nikoi (1930–2002), appointed the Governor of the Bank of Ghana from 1973 to 1977 and Finance minister from 1979 to 1981.

== Education and training ==
George Clerk was a pupil at Presbyterian primary schools at Somanya and Osu. He attended the boys' middle boarding school, the Salem School. Clerk had his secondary education at the Presbyterian Boys' Secondary School, then located in Odumase-Krobo. He enrolled at the University College of the Gold Coast and the University of London, then the parent institution of the university college. He received his bachelor's degree in botany with first-class honours and winning the first prize as the best graduating student in botany. G. C. Clerk was then awarded a postgraduate research fellowship at the University of London and the University of Bristol, and in 1963, earned a joint PhD-DIC in botany, with a sub-concentration in physiological mycology, from Imperial College London where he wrote his dissertation on asexual spores of parasitic fungi growing on the bodies of insects. His doctoral advisor was the British mycologist, Michael Francis Madelin (1931–2007), one of the world's earliest investigators of conidial fungi and slime moulds. The pioneer British plant pathologist, Ronald Karslake Starr Wood (1919 – 2017) also supervised his research in London.

== Career ==
Prior to his postgraduate studies, Clerk taught biology at Prempeh College for about three years in the late 1950s and also served as an assistant housemaster there. During this period, he was also an instructor in mathematical sciences to adult education students. He then became a researcher at the Plant Services Division of the Ministry of Agriculture. George Clerk rose through the ranks to attain the rank of Full Professor of Botany at the University of Ghana, Legon after joining the institution as a lecturer in 1964. While at the University of Ghana, he served as the Senior Tutor of the Senior Common Room and the Hall Master for Akuafo Hall from 1979 to 1980, a hall he had lived in as a student. He served as the departmental head and was appointed the Dean of Graduate Studies at the university.

He authored more than 250 peer-reviewed scientific publications including journal articles, abstracts, book chapters, textbooks as well as blueprints for international examination standards. Clerk's advanced treatise on plant diseases in Ghana and West Africa influenced public policies pertaining to plant development, as illustrated by his experimental investigation of the fungal pathogenesis of the black pod disease in the cocoa bean. In 1973, he became a Fellow of the Ghana Academy of Arts and Sciences, the only scholar to be elected that year. George Clerk's seminal book, Crops and their diseases in Ghana, was published in 1974, and secured the Ghana Book Award in 1982. G. C. Clerk was a Fulbright Scholar at the University of California, Riverside between 1973 and 1974. He was a visiting professor at the Ahmadu Bello and Lagos universities in Nigeria. He assumed the dean of science position at the University of Port Harcourt in the mid-eighties.

He was a board director at the Ghana Atomic Energy Commission from 1996 to 1998 along with his academic colleague, Marian Ewurama Addy, the first Ghanaian woman professor of natural science. He was a resource person, chief examiner for biology and a consultant to the West African Examinations Council. He was an external examiner and an assessor for faculty promotions at other institutions of higher education. Clerk was a regional representative of the Association of African Universities. Furthermore, he was a trustee at major organisations such as the Cocoa Research Institute of Ghana, Council for Scientific and Industrial Research, the Ghana National Commission for UNESCO, the Volta Basin Research Project and the Water Research Institute, formerly the Institute for Aquatic Biology.

== Personal life ==
G. C. Clerk was married; his children were Judith, George, Jnr., Nicholas, Theodore, Daniel and Dinah. Clerk was a trained pianist. His older brother was Nicholas T. Clerk (1930–2012), a former GIMPA Rector.

== Death and funeral ==
George Clerk died in Accra on 2 May 2019 after a short illness. Clerk's funeral service was held at the Akuafo Hall Chapel on the campus of the University of Ghana, Legon, before his burial at the Osu Cemetery in Accra. Upon his death, G. C. Clerk's obituary was published by Nature and the International Society for Plant Pathology.

== Awards and honours ==
- Fulbright Scholar (1973–1974)
- Ghana Book Award (1982)

== Books ==
- Clerk, G. C. (1963) “Studies on the survival and germination of conidia of three entomogenous fungi.” London
- (contrib.) Ewer, D. W.; Hall, J. B.; Clerk, G. C. (1972) “Ecological biology: for A-level and intermediate students in Africa." London: Longman
- Clerk, G. C. (1974) "Crops and their diseases in Ghana." Tema: Ghana Pub. Corp.
- (contrib.) Senteza Kajubi, W.; Clerk, G. C. et al. (1974) "African Encyclopedia." Oxford University Press
- (contrib.) Ewer, D. W.; Hall, J. B.; Clerk, G. C.; Coker, W. Z.; Oldman, R. S.; Owen, D. F. et al. (1989) “Ecological biology. 1: Organisms and their environments." Harlow: Longman
- Clerk, G. C. (1995) "Analysis and Interpretation of Biological Data for Senior Secondary Schools." Accra: Fairfield Publications

== Bibliography ==
=== Further reading ===
- Clerk, G. C. (1960) "A vein-clearing virus of sweet potato in Ghana." Plant Dis. Rep. 44: 932-933
- Clerk, G. C.; Madelin, M. F. (1965) “The longevity of conidia of three insect-parasitizing hyphomycetes.” Transactions of the British Mycological Society. 48 (2): 193-209
- Clerk, G. C.; Ayesu-Offei, E. N. (1967). "Conidia and conidial germination in Leveillula taurica (Lev.) Arn." Annals of Botany. 31(4): 749–754
- Clerk, G. C.; Caurie, M. (1968) "Biochemical changes caused by some Aspergillus species in root tuber of cassava (Manihot esculenta Crantz.)." Trop. Sci. 10: 149–154
- Clerk, G. C. (1969) “Influence of Soil Extracts on the Germination of Conidia of the Fungi Beauveria bassiana and Paecilomyces farinosus.” Journal of Invertebrate Pathology. 13: 120-124
- Clerk, G. C.; Ankora, J. K. (1969) "Development and release of conidia of Phyllactinia corylea." Canadian Journal of Botany. 47 (8): 1289–1290
- Bimpong, C. E.; Clerk, G. C. (1970) "Motility and Chemotaxis in Zoospores of Phytophthora palmivora (Butl.) Butl." Annals of Botany. 34 (3): 617–624
- Clerk, G. C.; Ankora, J. K. (1971) "Germination of conidia of Phyllactinia corylea at low humidities." Transactions of the British Mycological Society. 57 (1): 162–164
- Clerk, G. C. (1972) "Germination of Sporangia of Phytophthora palmivora (Butl.) Butl." Annals of Botany. 36 (4): 801–807
- Clerk, G.C. (1974) "Ultrastructure of Wall Swellings of Germinating Sporangia of Phytophthora palmivora (Butl.) Butl." Annals of Botany. 38 (5): 1103–106
- Maramba, P.; Clerk, G.C. (1974) "Survival of conidia of Trachysphaera fructigena." Transactions of the British Mycological Society. 63 (2): 391–393
- Clerk, G. C. (1978) "Tapinanthus bangwensis in a Cola Plantation in Ghana." PANS. 24 (1): 57–62
- Manu, M.; Clerk, G. C. (1981) "Secondary Sporangium Formation in Phytophthora Palmivora (Butl.) Butl." Annals of Botany. 47(3): 329–334
- Akushie, P-L; Clerk, G. C. (1981) "Effect of relative humidity on viability of Rhizopus oryzae sporangiospores." Transactions of the British Mycological Society. 76 (2): 332–334
- Cartey Caesar, J.; Clerk, G. C. (1985) "Water Stress-Induced Changes in the Morphology of the Powdery Mildew, Leveillula taurica (Lèv.) Arn." Journal of Phytopathology. 112 (3): 217–221
- Cartey Caesar, J.; Clerk, G. C. (1985) "Germinability of Leveillula taurica (powdery mildew) conidia obtained from water-stressed pepper plants." Canadian Journal of Botany. 63 (10): 1681–1684
- Odamtten, G. T.; Clerk, G. C. (1988) "Effect of metabolites of Aspergillus niger and Trichoderma viride on development and structure of radicle of cocoa (Theobroma cacao) seedlings." Plant and Soil. 106 (2): 285–288
- Ampofo, J. A.; Clerk, G. C. (2002) “Infestation of fish-culturing communities with fish-borne bacteria: The Ghanaian case.” International Journal of Environmental Health Research. 12 (3):277-82
- Ampofo, J. A.; Clerk, G. C. (2003) “Diversity of bacteria in sewage treatment plant used as fish culture pond in southern Ghana.” Aquaculture Research. 34 (8): 667-675
- Ampofo, J. A.; Clerk, G. C. (2003) “Bacterial flora of fish feeds and organic fertilizers for fish culture ponds in Ghana.” Aquaculture Research. 34 (8): 677-680
- Ameka, G. K.; Clerk, G. C.; Pfeifer, E.; Rutishauser, R. (2003) "Developmental morphology of Ledermanniella bowlingii (Podostemaceae) from Ghana." Plant Systematics and Evolution. 237 (3-4): 165–183
- Ampofo, J. A.; Clerk, G. C. (2010) “Diversity of Bacteria Contaminants in Tissues of Fish Cultured in Organic Waste-Fertilized Ponds: Health Implications.” The Open Fish Science Journal. 3 (1):142-146
- Annang, T. Y.; Yirenya-Tawiah, R. D.; Clerk, G. C. (2012) “Preliminary Studies on the Occurrence of Freshwater Epipelic Algae in the Densu Basin in Southern Ghana.” West African Journal of Ecology. 20 (2): 11–17
- Annang, T. Y.; Yirenya-Tawiah, R. D.; Clerk, G. C.; Smith, T. (2014) "Some aspects of the ecology of freshwater algae in the Densu River and two tributaries in Southern Ghana." International Journal of Environment. 3 (2): 246–257
