= Alexander Clerk =

Alexander Clerk may refer to:

- Alexander Worthy Clerk (1820–1906), Jamaican Moravian missionary, teacher and clergyman
- Alexander A. Clerk (born 1947), Ghanaian-American academic, psychiatrist and sleep medicine specialist
