= Carl Henry Clerk =

Ghanaian educator, minister and journalist (1895–1982)

The Reverend Carl Henry Clerk
- Carl Henry Clerk
- Born: 4 January 1895; Aburi, Gold Coast
- Died: 28 May 1982 (aged 87); Accra, Ghana
- Education: Basel Mission Seminary, Akropong; Tuskegee University; Columbia University
- Occupations: Clergyman; Agricultural Educationist; Administrator; Journalist; Editor
- Spouses: Juliana N. Nikoi (m. 1918; died 1919); Martha Ayorkor Quao (m. 1929)
- Children: 7, including Nicholas and George
- Parents: Nicholas Timothy Clerk (father); Anna Alice Meyer (mother)
- Relatives: Clerk family; Regina Hesse (grandaunt); Emmanuel Charles Quist (uncle); Nathan Quao (brother-in-law)

Ecclesiastical career
- Church: Presbyterian Church of Ghana
- Offices held: General manager, Presbyterian Schools (1935–1944); 4th Synod Clerk, Presbyterian Church of the Gold Coast; (1950–1954); Editor, Christian Messenger; (1960–1963)

Orders
- Ordination: Ebenezer Presbyterian Church, 1944

Carl Henry Clerk (4 January 1895 – 28 May 1982) was a Ghanaian agricultural educationist, administrator, journalist, editor and church minister. He was elected the fourth Synod Clerk of the Presbyterian Church of the Gold Coast, assuming the role of chief ecclesial officer of the national church from 1950 to 1954. Between 1960 and 1963, he was also the Editor of the Christian Messenger, established by the Basel Mission in 1883, as the newspaper of the Presbyterian Church of Ghana.

== Early life and family ==
Carl Henry Clerk was born at Aburi, about forty-five minutes north-east of the capital city, Accra, on 4 January 1895. He was born in the home of his paternal grandfather, Alexander Worthy Clerk (1820–1906). His father was Nicholas Timothy Clerk (1862–1961), a Basel-trained theologian and missionary, who was the first Synod Clerk of the Presbyterian Church of the Gold Coast from 1918 to 1932 and a founding father of the boys’ boarding high school, the Presbyterian Boys’ Secondary School, established in 1938. His mother, Anna Alice Meyer (1873–1934) was of Ga-Danish descent.

According to the Swiss German church historian and theologian, Hans Werner Debrunner, Carl Clerk's father, Nicholas Timothy Clerk, contemplated sending his young son to Germany in 1899, so he could receive well-rounded training in his formative years. N.T. Clerk was "worried about the possible effect of unsettled, isolated life confined to the interior" of the hinterlands, on his son's upbringing and development. Besides, Clerk wanted his son "to be a missionary or an engineer in the service of the mission." However, his Basel Mission colleagues strongly discouraged him, with the advice that "the best Christian education was the one given to a child by his own Christian parents". C.H. Clerk's paternal grandfather, Alexander Worthy Clerk, a Jamaican Moravian missionary arrived in the Danish Protectorate of Christiansborg, now the suburb of Osu, in Accra, Gold Coast in 1843, as part of the original group of 24 West Indian missionaries who worked under the auspices of the Basel Evangelical Missionary Society of Basel, Switzerland. A.W. Clerk was a pioneer of the Presbyterian Church of Ghana and a leader in education in colonial Ghana, establishing a boarding middle school, the Salem School in 1843. His paternal grandmother, Pauline Hesse (1831–1909), was from the Gold Coast, and was of Danish, German and Ga heritage. His grandaunt was Regina Hesse (1832─1898), a pioneer educator and school principal.

A third-generation member of the historically notable Clerk family, Carl Clerk had eight siblings. His younger brother, Theodore S. Clerk (1909–1965), was the first Ghanaian architect, who planned and developed the port city of Tema. His younger sisters were Jane E. Clerk (1904–1999), a pioneer woman education administrator, and Matilda J. Clerk (1916–1984), the second Ghanaian woman to become a physician and the first Ghanaian woman in any field to win an academic merit scholarship for university education abroad. His maternal uncle was Emmanuel Charles Quist (1880–1959), a barrister and judge who became the first African President of the Legislative Council from 1949 to 1951, Speaker of the National Assembly of the Gold Coast from 1951 to 1957, and Speaker of the National Assembly of Ghana from March 1957 to November 1957.

== Education and training ==
Clerk was educated at Basel mission primary schools in Worawora and Berekum, where his father was working as a Basel missionary at the time. Clerk attended the boys' boarding middle school, the Salem School, from 1908 to 1911, together with Max Dodu, who became the Moderator of the Presbyterian Church of Ghana from 1955 to 1958. Clerk then attended the Basel Mission Seminary at Akropong (now known as the Presbyterian College of Education, Akropong) from 1912 to 1916, and there he received training in pedagogy and theology. The seminary was founded by the Basel Mission in 1848 as the second oldest higher educational institution in early modern West Africa after Fourah Bay College, which was established in 1827. He studied for his bachelor's degree in agricultural science at Tuskegee University (then known as Tuskegee Institute) in Tuskegee, Alabama, on a scholarship from the Phelps Stokes Fund, before being awarded a year-long postgraduate fellowship to study education at the Teachers College, Columbia University in the City of New York in the 1920s. At Tuskegee, Clerk studied the works of the American botanist, George Washington Carver, who was then a research faculty member at the institute. In his college yearbook, Clerk was nicknamed "The Prof" by his classmates, an allusion to his studiousness and erudite nature. After completing his graduate studies at Columbia, Clerk sailed to his homeland from the Port of New York, aboard the steamship, the TSS Tuscania anchor line, and via the port of Glasgow in Scotland, according to a 1926 passenger manifest. He arrived in Glasgow on 26 March 1926.

== Career ==
=== Teaching and education management ===
Clerk dedicated his entire life to public service. He was a teacher at his alma mater, the Salem School (1917–1918) and school principal (1933–1935); the St. Thomas Infant School at Osu (1918–1922); Akropong Training College (1926–1932), and principal of Manyakpogunor Presbyterian School (1932 -1933). From 1935 to 1944, he was appointed the general manager of Presbyterian Schools in the Ga-Adangme District, covering modern-day Greater Accra and Eastern Regions. Within this period, he stayed at various stations: Kpong (1935–1936); Odumase-Krobo (1937); Somanya (1938–1939); and Osu (1940–1944). He later taught agricultural science at the O’Reilly Secondary School (1955–1959) and Accra Training College (1964–1969). Clerk served as the first Chairperson of the Board of Directors of Aburi Girls' Secondary School.

=== Pastoral work and journalism ===
Clerk was a catechist in charge of the local church at Manyakpogunor (1926–1932). He was ordained a minister on 6 February 1944 at the Ebenezer Presbyterian Church, together with two other ordinands, Messrs. Cleland and Nartey. Clerk's father, who was then eighty-one years old, was among the ordination ceremony's officiating clergy. Carl Clerk gave the inaugural sermon on behalf of the three newly installed ministers of the Gospel.

Clerk served as a chaplain in local churches at Abokobi (1944–1946); Sekondi (1946–1947); Teshie (1948) and Osu (1949). As a chaplain at Abokobi, he established the local middle school there. At Odumase, he led the formation of the church choir and was its lead organist and first choirmaster. Additionally, at Somanya, he acquired the building for the local Presbyterian chapel and founded and robed the church choir.

Like his father before him, he was elected the fourth Synod Clerk of the Presbyterian Church of the Gold Coast, serving as the organisation's de facto chief administrator from 1950 to 1954. As Synod Clerk and organisational head, Clerk was instrumental in the start and completion of the old Church Offices at Accra. He led the Gold Coast delegation and was among five representatives from Africa to the World Council of Churches' second assembly, a global ecumenical meeting held in Evanston, Illinois from 15 to 31 August 1954. At the opening session of the assembly, discussions were held on a few of the civil rights topics of that era, including desegregation and interracial marriage. Clerk also served as the Editor of the Christian Messenger newspaper from 1960 to 1963.

== Personal life ==
Carl H. Clerk first married Juliana N. Nikoi (1897–1919), the daughter of an administrative clerk in the colonial civil service from Christiansborg, Accra on 7 March 1918 but his wife and newly born son died in 1919. He remarried on 6 June 1929 to a Ga woman from Ga-Mashie and La, Martha Ayorkor Quao (1911–1989), whose father Daniel Quao was a general commodities merchant based at Adawso. Martha Quao was also an entrepreneur who owned a bakery business. Her maternal grandfather, Nii Ngleshie Addy I was the first son of Nii Tetteh Tsuru I, the founder and ruler of the Otuopai Clan, a royal house in Ga State. Her younger brother was Nathan Quao (1915–2005), a diplomat, educationist and public servant who served as a presidential advisor to many Heads of State of Ghana. She was also the maternal aunt of the economist and diplomat, Amon Nikoi (1930–2002), the Governor of the Bank of Ghana from 1973 to 1977 and Finance minister from 1979 to 1981, whose mother, Betty Oboshie Quao, was Quao's older biological sister. In addition, Martha Quao's cousin was the Ghanaian barrister and judge Nii Amaa Ollennu (1906–1986), who was elected the Speaker of the Parliament of Ghana during the Second Republic as well as serving as the Chairman of the Presidential Commission and acting President of Ghana from 7 August 1970 to 31 August 1970.

Carl Clerk had six children with Martha Quao: Nicholas, George, Arnold, Anna (Mrs. Sai), Alexander Worthy (died in infancy) and Henry Clerk's children went on to forge careers in academia, public service and broadcast journalism.

Clerk was a poet and an accomplished organist. An artisan, Carl Clerk was also adept at many crafts, including carpentry, masonry, tailoring and painting. He was also engaged in backyard gardening and animal husbandry, especially poultry farming.

== Death and legacy ==
Clerk died of pneumonia on 28 May 1982 at his home in Osu, Accra. After his funeral service at the Ebenezer Presbyterian Church, Osu, his body was interred in the "Presbyterian clergy quarter (section)" of the Osu Cemetery (formerly known as Christiansborg Civil Cemetery) in Accra. The Presbyterian Girls' School at Osu named its assembly hall in his honour, in recognition of his sacrifice and fundraising efforts during his tenure as the general manager of Presbyterian Schools, as "the sole driving force in getting permanent buildings put up" for the institution.
