= Nicholas Timothy Clerk =

Gold Coast theologian, minister and missionary (1862–1961)

The Reverend Nicholas Timothy Clerk
- Nicholas Timothy Clerk
- Born: 28 October 1862; Aburi, Gold Coast
- Died: 16 August 1961 (aged 98); Accra, Ghana
- Education: Basel Mission Seminary, Akropong; Basel Mission Seminary, Basel, Switzerland
- Occupations: Clergyman; Theologian; Missionary
- Spouse: Anna Alice Meyer (m. 1891; died 1934)
- Children: 9, including Carl, Jane, Theodore and Matilda
- Parents: Alexander Worthy Clerk (father); Pauline Hesse (mother)
- Relatives: Clerk family; Regina Hesse (aunt)

Ecclesiastical career
- Church: Presbyterian Church of the Gold Coast; Basel Evangelical Missionary Society
- Offices held: 1st Synod Clerk, Presbyterian Church of the Gold Coast; (1918 – 1932)

Orders
- Ordination: Korntal, 1888
- Consecration: 5 July 1888, Basel Minster

Nicholas Timothy Clerk (28 October 1862 – 16 August 1961) was a Gold Coast theologian, clergyman and pioneering missionary of the Basel Evangelical Missionary Society in southeast colonial Ghana. His father was the Jamaican Moravian missionary and teacher, Alexander Worthy Clerk (1820 – 1906), who worked extensively on the Gold Coast with the Basel Mission and co-founded in 1843 the Salem School, a Presbyterian boarding middle school for boys. Born on the Gold Coast, N. T. Clerk was educated in Germany and Switzerland. He returned to Ghana and worked as a missionary, congregational pastor and church planter. He was later elected the first Synod Clerk of the Presbyterian Church of the Gold Coast, in effect, the chief ecclesiastical officer, equivalent to the chief administrator, leading the overall strategic operations of the national Reformed Protestant church organisation, a position he held from 1918 to 1932. A staunch advocate of secondary education, Nicholas Timothy Clerk became a founding father of the all-boys Presbyterian boarding school in Ghana, the Presbyterian Boys' Secondary School, established in 1938. As Synod Clerk, he pushed vigorously for and was instrumental in turning the original idea of a church mission high school into reality.

== Early life and education ==
=== Gold Coast ===
Nicholas Timothy Clerk was born on 28 October 1862 at Aburi, about twenty miles north-east of the Ghanaian capital, Accra. N. T. Clerk was a second generation descendant of the historic Clerk family of Accra. His father was Alexander Worthy Clerk, a Jamaican Moravian missionary who was among the first group of West Indians, recruited by the Danish minister, Andreas Riis (1804–1854) of the Basel Evangelical Missionary Society in 1843. Riis lived on the Gold Coast from 1832 to 1845. His mother, Pauline Hesse (1831–1909) was from the Gold Coast, and was of Danish, German and Ga descent. His aunt was Regina Hesse (1832 –1898), a pioneer educator and school principal. He studied at Basel Mission primary and boarding middle schools in Aburi. During his basic school years, Clerk took subjects in reading, writing, arithmetic, biblical studies, history, geography, science, music and general religion. This was followed by pedagogy and theology training at the Basel Mission Seminary, now the Presbyterian College of Education, Akropong, in the state of Akuapem, 32 miles (51 km) north-north-east of Accra where he showed strong interest in Christian missionary work and stayed until the end of 1883. He was described by his biographer, the Swiss German church historian and theologian, Hans Werner Debrunner, as "a sturdy lad who had inherited his father's intelligence...and was by far the best student" at the Akropong seminary. The Basel missionaries founded the Akropong seminary in 1848 as the second oldest higher educational institution in early modern West Africa after Fourah Bay College, established in 1827. Nicholas Clerk spent his summers helping the German Huppenbauer missionary family household at Aburi. In 1884, Mrs. Huppenbauer gave birth to a baby, Carl. Nicholas, together with others assisted in the care of the baby while Mrs. Huppenbauer underwent emergency surgery to amputate a gangrene-afflicted leg, performed by Dr. Mahly, an ethnologist and a linguist, who used a hand saw, a bread knife and silk thread for the procedure. After a short period of recovery, the Huppenbauer family returned to Germany with Nicholas Clerk who was about to continue his seminary studies in Europe.

=== Germany and Switzerland ===
Nicholas Clerk spent a year (1884 – 1885) in Schorndorf, about 42 miles (26 km) east of Stuttgart in the Kingdom of Württemberg learning Latin, Biblical Greek and Biblical Hebrew and mastering German while living with and studying under the award-winning German philologist, Johann Gottlieb Christaller who had earlier been influential in the translation of the Bible into the Twi language with the help of Akan linguists and missionaries, David Asante, Theophilus Opoku, Jonathan Palmer Bekoe and Paul Staudt Keteku. Christaller was a two-time recipient (1876; 1882) of the most prestigious linguistics prize, The Prix Volney, awarded since 1822, by the Institut de France "to recognize work in general and comparative linguistics." While living in Germany, Clerk assisted Christaller in completing some of his works in the Twi language. With the aid of a bursary awarded by the Basel Mission, Clerk then pursued further studies at the Basel Mission Seminary (Basler Missionsseminar) between August 1885 and July 1888, where he received advanced instruction in theology, philosophy and linguistics, with special emphasis on philology. His theology courses included dogmatics, homiletics and catechesis. Clerk was the third African to be educated in Europe by the Basel Mission after the Americo-Liberian pastor, George Peter Thompson, an 1842 alumnus and the native Akan missionary, David Asante who had earlier completed his training in 1862. The Basel mission also had a holistic and rigorous skills-based approach to educating its students. This was geared towards teaching them the survival know-how to especially endure harsh terrains during Christian missionary fieldwork. In this regard, in addition to his integrated classical education, N. T. Clerk received practical training in geography and cartography, botany, rudimentary civil engineering as well as basic natural science, medicine, anatomy and surgery. At Basel, Clerk suffered a nervous breakdown halfway through his studies but recovered quickly. He passed his final examinations, was consecrated in the Basel Minster as a missionary on 5 July 1888 and shortly thereafter, ordained a minister at Korntal, situated at the northwestern border of Stuttgart of the now German state of Baden-Württemberg. Briefly transiting in Liverpool in August 1888, he arrived in his homeland, two months later, in October 1888.

== Missionary work ==
Clerk's first station was at Anum, on the banks of the Volta River, about 50 miles (80 km) inland, where he arrived in October 1888. In August, 1890 he left Anum to start a mission station in the State of Buem in what is now the Volta Region of Ghana. He chose Worawora, more than 110 miles (176 km) from the coast, as his headquarters. In Worawora, he built a school, a chapel, an administrative office and a house for himself. He also constructed a water well for the Worawora community. In August of the 1891, he left Anum to establish a mission station he worked in at Boradaa in the Buem area and later, became the principal evangelist there. In January 1894, Clerk was a delegate of the Synod of the Basel Mission held on the coast.

As a social reformer, N. T. Clerk preached against harmful practices such as human sacrifice, persecution of albinos, witch-hunt, oppression of widows and orphans, infanticide, specifically, superstitious killing of twins as well as ritual servitude and slavery, child labour and trafficking. He encouraged parents to send their children, including the girl-child, to school. He also tried to persuade adults to join the church, but adherence to the practice of polygamy (which was opposed by the Christian Church) made his work difficult. He had come to Buem at a time when it was still independent of either German or British rule, and when inter-tribal wars were not uncommon. The younger generation wanted him to side with them in community disputes with their elders. However, Clerk remained neutral, infuriating the youth who refused to cooperate with him In spite of many challenges, the Worawora mission station was making modest progress by 1898. In 1899, when the inhabitants moved from the hill to the valley, Clerk followed them, and established a new mission station. Buem had then become a part of the German Togoland, conditions of peace prevailed, and Clerk's work had become easier. Before the forcible German takeover of Buem, the inhabitants had wanted Clerk to persuade the British to annex the area, while the German administration, based in Lomé on the coast, had sent a messenger to him to ask him to persuade the people of Buem to become German subjects, but he had refused to take sides based on his personal conviction and the apolitical code of conduct for a Basel missionary at the time which required that he remained neutral in all issues relating to colonial governance.

With a family to support, Clerk struggled to live on his meagre £10 monthly stipend, and occasionally felt that he should seek a more lucrative post. Dr. Grüner, the German district commissioner at Misahohé, nearly 50 miles (80 km) to the south in what is now the Republic of Togo, had heard of his plight, and in 1893 had written to him, offering him a permanent post in the civil service of the German administration with a starting monthly salary of 500 Deutschmarks. Nonetheless, Clerk once again refused to quit his mission job with the response that he considered the Basel Mission to be his "mother" and he cannot leave her side. Though he disliked the German way of treating Africans, and made them aware of it, he was still highly regarded by the Germans.

Under German rule, parents were obliged to send their children to school, and cleanliness as well as hygiene were strictly enforced. As an educator, Clerk taught his converts to plant cocoa using more modern mechanised methods and his pioneering work in agriculture bore fruit years later. The German administration insisted that Ewe should be taught in the mission's schools instead of the Basel-preferred language of Twi. As a result, Clerk could not continue his work in Buem. In the 1904 (the year he left), the Basel Mission station was transferred to the jurisdiction of the Bremen Mission.

Clerk then moved to Berekum, near Sunyani, about 80 miles (128 km) northwest of Kumasi, in what is now the Brong -Ahafo Region of Ghana, and here he had intended to settle. The paramount chief however refused to grant him accommodation, and the inhabitants would not help him build a house. Nonetheless, N. T. Clerk established the first congregation, in the Brong Ahafo Presbytery, the Berekum Congregation, in 1905 and was its first residential Minister. The Berekum Presbyterian District was founded in 1920. After nearly three lacklustre years and in the face of hostility, intimidation and poor health including a tapeworm infection, he was transferred to Larteh, just south of Akropong, where he found the work more pleasant, staying there as the resident district minister from 1907 to 1918. In an entrepreneurial drive and a practical approach to sustain their work, Clerk and several African Christian missionaries set up cocoa farms. With financial proceeds he received from his personal farm enterprise at Adawso, a few miles to the west, he was able to give his children high-quality education and raise them to become responsible professionals in society: a Protestant minister, an architect, teachers, a nurse, a medical doctor and fashion designers.

An extensive collection of Nicholas Clerk's cartographic manuscripts and ethnographic reports, produced from his missionary work in numerous Ghanaian towns and villages, is housed at the Archives and Library of the Basel Mission / Mission 21 in Basel, Switzerland.

== Synod Clerk of the Presbyterian Church ==
The European members of the Basel Mission, however, did not treat their African colleagues as adults, and denied them church and mission administration positions with central decisions concerning the local church made in Basel, Switzerland. Clerk objected to the paternalism, and felt that the Basel Mission on the Gold Coast should become operationally decentralised and tailored more to the local context, a view which he communicated strongly to the European missionaries. The onset of the First World War (1914-1918) gave the African missionaries the opportunity to assume more managerial roles which had been previously closed to them. When the Basel Mission was expelled from the Gold Coast in 1917 during World War I, the Free Church of Scotland led by the minister, A. W. Wilkie took over their work.

A Synod (a Presbyterian judicatory or polity, composed of members from all presbyteries within its geographic jurisdiction) and a Synod Committee were established. Clerk was elected the first Synod Clerk of the Presbyterian Church of the Gold Coast on 14 August 1918; his tenure of office, as effectively the chief administrative officer and de facto organisational leader of the wholly indigenous and self-governing African church was from 1918 to 1932. In his inaugural address, N. T. Clerk passionately argued for a secondary school for boys, a pitch which was eventually taken up by the church leading to the establishment of the Presbyterian Boys' Secondary School in 1938. Peter Hall, the son of John Hall, another Jamaican missionary was also elected the first Moderator of Presbyterian Church of the Gold Coast in 1918. At the 1918 Synod held at the Christ Presbyterian Church, Akropong, Hall and Clerk authored the first constitution of the Ghanaian Presbyterian Church. At the Synod, the church retained its eleven districts: Christiansborg (Osu), Abokobi, Odumase-Krobo, Aburi, Akropong, Anum, Kyebi, Begoro, Nsaba, Abetifi and Kumasi. At the 1922 Synod, the first five Presbyteries were created: Ga and Adangme; Akuapem and Anum; Agona and Kotoku; Akyem and Okwawu; Asante and Asante Akyem. Mission stations were opened at Aburi, Larteh, Odumase, Abokobi, Kyebi, Gyadam, Kwahu, Asante, Anum as well as the Northern territories including Yendi and Salaga.

Determined to thrive as an administrator, Clerk preached self-reliance and self-sufficiency, refusing to ask foreign Missionary Societies for funds This posture was unpopular at home as the church was facing a financial crisis; while public schoolteachers were paid respectable salaries, Presbyterian pastors received small stipends that the church could afford. Clerk's administration initially relied on sequestration for funding. Given the patronising attitudes African employees had experienced from the Basel Mission leadership, Clerk was naturally wary of the Scottish missionaries but he eventually collaborated with them in the formation of the national Presbyterian Church. As Synod Clerk, he emphasised the continued use of indigenous languages in church and school, and insisted on an unassuming and austere lifestyle. Clerk also attempted to forge unity between the Presbyterian church and the Evangelical Presbyterian Church with the objective of forming a merger, the "United Presbyterian Church of the Gold Coast" but his unification efforts proved futile.

In the 1926 Synod meeting opened by N. T. Clerk, at Abetifi, the church polity voted to adopt the name ‘The Presbyterian Church of the Gold Coast’ later to become ‘The Presbyterian Church of Ghana’ after the country gained its independence from the United Kingdom in 1957. The change in name from the Basel Mission Church to the Presbyterian Church was in recognition to the complex history between the Scottish Presbyterian polity, the 1560 Scottish Reformation and the pivotal role the City of Basel in Switzerland played during the Protestant Reformation. After the Basel Missionaries were permitted to return to the Gold Coast in 1926, they cooperated with their Scottish colleagues, working together in the renamed and independent Presbyterian Church of the Gold Coast. In that same year, 1926, Clerk returned to Basel as the church's delegate, and was able to dispel any notions in missionary circles that the Presbyterian Church had forgotten its roots and its debt to the Basel Mission.

In this context, the church's logo is an expression of the "triple heritage" of missionary epochs in the formation of the Ghanaian Presbyterian church, representing the efforts of the Basel Europeans, the Moravian West Indians and the Scottish Presbyterians. This coming together of the three main missionary eras to forming one entity is captured in the church's motto, "That they all may be one."

The Synod took place biennially between 1918 and 1950, after which it was organised on a yearly basis. Furthermore, from 1918 to 2000, the Ghanaian Presbyterian Church operated the Synod system. At the 2000 Abetifi Synod, the Church switched to the General Assembly system, with the first General Assembly held in Navrongo in 2001.

Nicholas T. Clerk also attended the International Missionary Council (IMC) conference from 14 to 20 September 1926 held in Le Zoute (Het Zoute) in the municipality of Knokke-Heist in the Belgian province of West Flanders, on the theme "The Christian Mission in Africa". The event brought together clergymen, missionary educationalists, medical experts and consultative members from the global academic community to discuss a variety of topics, relating to formal education and holistic training on the African continent, with topics encompassing "the Christian ideal in education, policy curriculum, the education of women and girls, the medium of instruction, languages and literature, and religious education." The IMC “encouraged ecumenical cooperation in support of world evangelization," and had its roots in the 1910 World Mission Conference in Edinburgh – a meeting that established the International Review of Mission, subsequently leading to the formation of the International Missionary Council in 1921 which was later incorporated into the World Council of Churches in 1961, as the Commission on World Mission and Evangelism.

== Later years ==
After Clerk's retirement in 1933, he split his time between Adawso and his home in Christiansborg (Osu) and continued to be active in church work. He often gave sermons at the local chapel, Ebenezer Presbyterian Church, in Osu as a locum tenens minister, even at the age of 90.

The Government of the Gold Coast, on behalf of King George V and The Crown, awarded him a Certificate and a Badge of Honour, in June 1934 in recognition of his dedicated and distinguished service to his country and selfless contributions to education and nation building. The people of Buem invited him to visit them in 1937, a happy reunion he considered his "greatest moment".

== Personal life ==
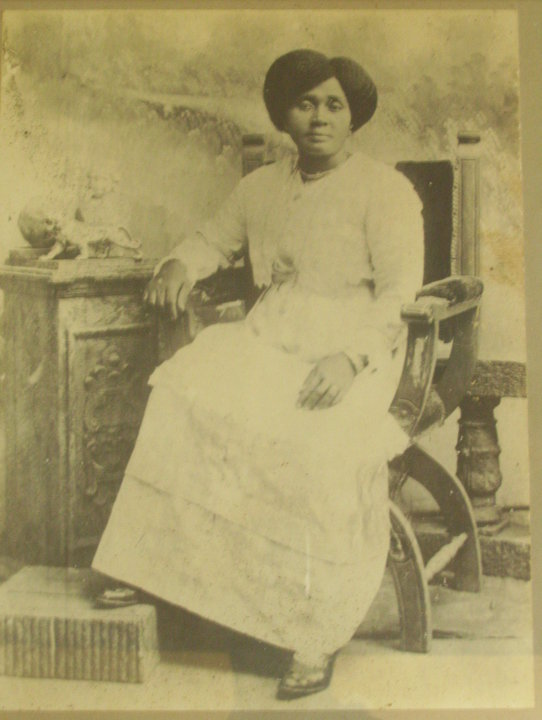
Anna Alice Meyer, Gold Coast, 1890s

Nicholas Timothy Clerk married Anna Alice Meyer (born on 13 March 1873), a homemaker and teacher from Christiansborg (Osu) on 26 February 1891 at Aburi. The wedding ceremony was officiated by Clerk's own father, the Rev. A. W. Clerk. Meyer was described as a "mulatress" and the daughter of the Rev. Carl Meyer, an 1850 seminarist at Christiansborg and a minister of the Basel Mission who belonged to the Meyer family that had origins in Denmark and was associated with a trading company on the Gold Coast. Anna Meyer's mother was a member of the Ga people of Accra and hailed from Agbajajoohe, a hamlet near the Christiansborg Castle in Osu. A descendant of the Euro-African mercantile class, Anna Meyer's probable ancestors included Hartvig Meyer, the Danish Governor of the Gold Coast from 11 September 1703 to 23 April 1704, and Peder Meyer, the Danish colonial merchant who settled on the Gold Coast and flourished between the last decade of the eighteenth century and the first decade of the nineteenth century.

She was educated at the now defunct all-girls boarding school, Basel Mission Girls’ School, established by Catherine Mulgrave in 1857, at Abokobi near Accra. Anna Meyer had spent half-a-year in Odumase with her uncle, Carl Quist/Karl Kvist (1843–99) who had previously been a catechist and a housemaster at the pastors' seminary. Carl Quist's son (Meyer's cousin) was Emmanuel Charles Quist (1880 – 1959), a barrister and judge who became the first African President of the Legislative Council from 1949 to 1951, Speaker of the National Assembly of the Gold Coast from 1951 to 1957, and Speaker of the National Assembly of Ghana from March 1957 to November 1957.

Anna Meyer also stayed with the German missionary Kopps family. Several of the Abokobi school's enrolled pupils came from the Euro-African Christian families of Christiansborg in Osu though the school was open to all. In this regard, the Abokobi school was quite similar to the Christiansborg Castle School, opened in 1722, as well as the Cape Coast Castle School, established in the eighteenth century by the Reverend Thompson of the Anglican Society for the Propagation of the Gospel in Foreign Parts (SPG) associated with the Church of England. The castle schools were originally approved by the European Governors to baptise and educate the male Euro-African children of European men and Gold Coast African women. These children later became clerks and soldiers in the colonial civil service.

Nicholas and Anna Clerk had nine children: Paulina Ruth (Mrs. Tagoe), Alexander Worthy (died in infancy), Carl Henry, Kate Hedwig (Mrs. Odonkor), Caroline Rebecca (Mrs. Quartey), Theodora Louisa (Mrs. Hall), Jane Elizabeth, Theodore Shealtiel and Matilda Johanna Clerk.

Within a year of his retirement, Clerk's wife, Anna Alice died suddenly on 2 August 1934 from a heart attack at their home in Adawso. Like his father, A. W. Clerk, N. T. Clerk was a polyglot; he read, wrote and spoke English, Ga, German and Twi fluently.

== Selected writings ==
- Clerk, N. T. with foreword by Christaller, J. G. (1890), "Neue Reise in den Hinterländen von Togo, nach Nkonya, Buem, Obooso, Salaga, Krakye, 2. Dezember 1889 bis 5. Februar 1890," Mitteilungen der geographischen Gesellschaft für Thüringen zu Jena, vol. IX, pp. 77 – 98 [An account of the northern Volta of the Gold Coast, written entirely in German in the "Missionsgeorgraphischer Teil" of the periodical, Journal of the Geographical Society of Thuringia]
- Clerk, N. T. (1943), "The Settlement of West Indian Emigrants on the Gold Coast under the Auspices of the Basel Mission 1843-1943 - A Centenary Sketch," Accra

== Death and funeral ==
He died of natural causes at his home in Osu, Accra, at age 98, on 16 August 1961. A large crowd was present to mourn him at his funeral service held at the Ebenezer Presbyterian Church, Osu. His remains were interred in the Basel Mission quarter (section) of the Osu Cemetery (formerly known as the Christiansborg Civil Cemetery) in Accra.

== Memorials and legacy ==
In appreciation of his contributions to education, the Government of the Gold Coast honoured him by naming two streets in Ghana after him: The Reverend Nicholas Timothy Clerk Road in Worawora and the Clerk Street in Osu, Accra. A boarding house, Clerk House at the Presbyterian Boys' Secondary School (PRESEC, Legon) was named in his honour, in recognition of his selfless service to the church and the founding of a school that became synonymous with academic excellence and highly regarded alumni. The "N. T. Clerk Congregation" in the Volta Presbytery of the Presbyterian Church of Ghana was named in his honour for the evangelical work he did in the Worawora area. The Rev. N. T. Clerk Memorial International School, Worawora was also named in his memory. A roundabout and a church in Buem were also named in Nicholas Clerk's honour. The Presbyterian Church today has instituted "Presbyterian Day" also "Ebenezer Day", a special Sunday designated in the church almanac to celebrate the arrival on 18 December 1828, selfless work and toil of the missionaries in the early years. There is a commemorative monument in front of the Anum Presbyterian Church, Anum in memory of Nicholas Timothy Clerk and other pioneering Basel missionaries who planted the Anum Presbytery. The names of Nicholas Clerk and his father, Alexander Clerk appear on a commemorative plaque in the sanctuary of the Ebenezer Presbyterian Church, Osu, listing pioneering missionaries of the church, in recognition of their contributions to formal education and the growth of the Presbyterian faith in Ghana.

== Literature ==
- Debrunner, Hans Werner (1965). Owura Nico: the Rev. Nicholas Timothy Clerk, 1862-1961, pioneer and church leader (translated by Susanne Mainzer). Accra: Waterville Pub. House

== Bibliography ==
=== Notes ===
1. Over the years, several of N. T. Clerk's children and grandchildren have made significant contributions to the development of Ghana in areas relating to architecture, church development, civil service, education, health services, print and broadcast journalism, medicine, natural sciences, public administration, public health, public policy and urban planning.
