= Sai (surname) =

Surname list

Sai is a patronymic surname of Ga origin. The bearers of the name typically hail from Osu, Accra in Ghana. Notable people with the surname include:

- Florence Oboshie Sai-Cofie (born 1953), Ghanaian media executive and politician
- Fred T. Sai (1924 – 2019), Ghanaian physician and family planning advocate
- Emmanuel Ashaley Sai (1933 – 2011), Head of Civil Service, Chairman of Public Services Commission and Cabinet Secretary, Republic of Ghana
- Obodai Sai (born 1984), Ghanaian boxer
