= Ebenezer Presbyterian Church, Osu =

Presbyterian church in Accra, Ghana

Osu Ebenezer Presbyterian Church
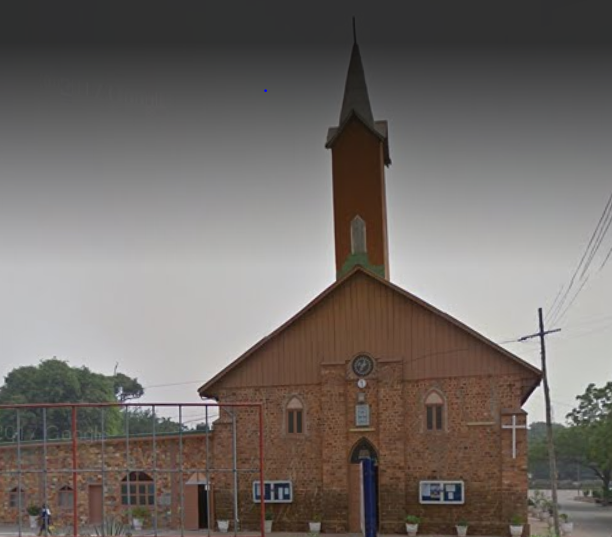
- The main entrance, west wing of the Ebenezer Presbyterian Church, Osu
- Osu Ebenezer Presbyterian Church
- 5.5542°N 0.1846°W
- Location: Osu, Accra
- Country: Ghana
- Denomination: Presbyterian Church of Ghana
- Previous denomination: Basel Evangelical Missionary Society
- Website: Osu Ebenezer Presbyterian Church

History
- Former name(s): Basel Mission Church, Christiansborg
- Founded: 1847; 179 years ago
- Founder: Basel Mission

Architecture
- Architect: Karl Epting
- Style: Brick Romanesque
- Years built: 1898–02
- Completed: 1902; 124 years ago

Specifications
- Capacity: 2500
- "EBEN-EZER 1902 1 Sam 7: 12"

The Ebenezer Presbyterian Church, formerly known as the Basel Mission Church, Christiansborg, is a historic Protestant church located in the suburb of Osu in Accra, Ghana. The church was founded by the Basel Evangelical Missionary Society in 1847. Previously near the Christiansborg Castle at a hamlet called Osu Amanfong, where a commemorative monument now stands, the church relocated northwards to its present location near the Salem School when a new chapel was constructed and consecrated in 1902. The church is affiliated to the Presbyterian Church of Ghana. Liturgical services are conducted in English and the Ga language.

== Historical background ==
The origins of Christianity on the Gold Coast can be traced to the arrival of Portuguese traders in the early 16th century. They baptized the paramount chief of Fetu, Cape Coast in 1503. By 1576, the spread of Christianity had stalled. In the subsequent two hundred and fifty years, activities of a few missionary societies including the French Capuchin Franciscans based in Axim and Komenda, the Moravian Mission in Accra and Elmina as well as the Society for the Propagation of the Gospel in Foreign Parts in Cape Coast yielded negligible outcomes in the hinterlands.

Missionaries of the Basel Evangelical Missionary Society arrived in the Danish Protectorate of Christiansborg, (now the suburb of Osu) in Gold Coast in 1828 at the behest of the then Danish Governor, Major Christopher von Richelieu. Founded in 1815 in Basel, Switzerland at the height of the Pietist theological movement, many of its young missionaries came from working class artisan backgrounds in Wurtemberg located in southern Germany. Pietism sought to “revitalise the Christian church from within by deepening and making more personal the religious life of the Christian community. It aimed at expressing their Christian convictions through positive deeds and exemplary life-styles including spreading the Gospel to other continents in response to the ‘call of God’.” In their view, formal education, agriculture, small scale industry, arts and craft went hand in hand with the propagation of the Gospel.

Several European communities from the United Kingdom, Denmark and the Netherlands had an established presence on the coast where trade and commerce flourished. The Danish colonial administration permitted its employees to co-habit with local women in monogamous relationships. As such, a sizable Euro-African community existed at the time which consisted of the “mulatto” offspring of these unions. Major Richelieu's request for evangelization was geared at restoring Christianity morality among the population. Four Basel missionaries from Germany and Switzerland landed on the shores of the Gold Coast in 1828. They were Karl Salbach, Gottlieb Holzwarth, Johannes Henke and Johannes Schmidt. By 1831, all four who were in their twenties had died from afflictions from tropical diseases. A second missions group was dispatched by the Basel Mission in 1832. The missionaries were Andreas Riis, Peter Jager and Christian Heinze. Jager and Heinze died within a few months of their arrival from tropical illnesses. In the coastal town of Osu, only fourteen adult natives were converted Christianity from 1828 to 1850. The surviving missionary, Andreas Riis relocated to the hilly town of Akropong in 1835, where the cool climate was more favourable, effectively leading to the consolidation of the missionary work.

The remaining Basel Mission post in Osu carried out missionary work and in 1847, the Basel Mission Church in Osu, which would later become the Ebenezer Presbyterian Church was founded by the mission. Similar churches were established in neighbouring Ga towns along the coast such as La and Teshie. The precursor to the church was the establishment of a school in 1843, the Salem School to educate the children of the Christian converts. The founding schoolmasters were the Americo-Liberian, George Thompson as well the West Indian Moravian missionaries, Alexander Worthy Clerk and Angolan-born, Catherine Mulgrave who were working under the auspices of the Basel Mission.

The Danes sold their fort, the Christiansborg Castle in 1850 to the British authorities. In 1852, the British introduced a poll tax ordinance which was fiercely opposed by the locals. The natives of Osu, La and Teshie refused to pay the new tax imposed and in 1854, the British bombarded the township with their warship, the “H. M. Scourge”. The mud huts were reduced to rubble and several inhabitants relocated to the hinterland plains beneath the Akwapim ridge. The infrastructure of the Basel Mission was destroyed in the melee.

As a result, a team of 30 Basel missionaries and their converts moved their operations to the hamlet of Abokobi to start a new mission station on land bought that had been earlier bought by Andreas Riis. According to Basel mission historical records, “Johannes Zimmerman, the head of the Abokobi mission station had a vision of not only creating there a model Christian farming community but also the settlement there of German Christian farmers and craftsmen to demonstrate to the heathen community the totality of Christian living.” The Abokobi station became a model Christian station, on which the Osu post at Amanfong was rebuilt in 1856.

=== Building of the chapel ===
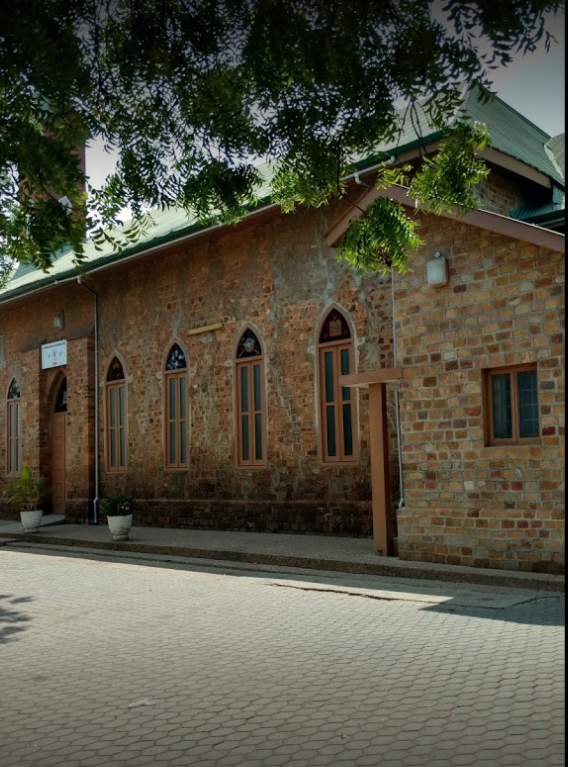
South entrance of the church

In 1856, the Abokobi emigrants returned to Osu after rebuilding efforts kicked off. The local Christian community decided to build a new chapel to replace the old one which had become too small for worship. Furthermore, its proximity to the Atlantic Ocean led to the corrosion and decay of the structure. Osu was now a much larger town with natives living further inland. The chapel was therefore now far from the inhabitants. The Christiansborg Castle was no longer the hub of activity of Osu. The natural noise of the sea waves made it very difficult to hear the sea waves during church services.

In 1862, there was a massive earthquake in Accra which damaged parts of the Christiansborg Castle. After the capital of the Gold Coast moved from Cape Coast to Accra, the Danish fort became the official seat of government. The renovations included the construction of a residential quarters for the Governor of the Gold Coast. For security reasons, the British colonial administration bought the surrounding huts and land around the castle and converted it to a botanical garden. For these reasons, it was decided by the congregation to move to a new site.

In 1898, the church acquired a plot of land north of the Osu coast in a central part of the town that was easily accessible by the Christian locals and distant from the ocean. The missionaries chose a site near the Salem quarters which housed the middle boarding school. This location would also not interfere with drumming and dancing of the traditional community.

The church had to raise funds for the new chapel to be built. The church carried out a fundraising campaign from 1898 to 1901. Funds were raised in Deutsche Marks (DM). About DM 1800 came from general contributions of community members, DM 2500 was reallocated from the Basel Mission Committee Poor Fund for building the chapel, DM 2600 was from the European community living near the castle at Amanfong and DM 4000 from the African Ga Christians living in Osu. The African civil servants working at the seat of government pledged to contribute a sum of DM 200 monthly until the completion of the chapel building but payments were irregular. The decision by the Basel Mission to use money from the Poor Fund was based on the fact that several congregants were involved in trade or worked in the colonial civil service and had a relatively high standard of living. The Fund was therefore not being used. An additional DM 2000 was raised in Basel and remitted to Osu. This was an exception because normally, the Basel Mission Committee did not fund overseas construction projects. Funds had always been raised locally in the mission stations but the committee waived the rule due to the enthusiastic engagement of native congregants which was appreciates by member of the Osu church.

The Basel Committee commissioned Karl Epting, a missionary architect from Basel who lived on the Gold Coast to prepare the drawings of the new church and supervise the project. Epting had to divide his time between Accra and Kumasi where the renovation of the Basel Mission House was taking place. The foundation stone of the church was laid on 1 March 1902. Many artisans and craftsmen of Osu volunteered their services for free.

By the beginning of July 1902, the structure had reached a height of 25 feet. The wooden super-structure to support the roofing tiles was firmly put in place and the walls of the chapel were completed. The tower of the church which would house the belfry stood at 85 feet and a crucifix was placed atop it. Inside the chapel, an upper gallery with a seating capacity of 200 was constructed. The floors were filled with stones 18-inches deep. Women and children played key roles with the transportation of stones for floor tiling.

=== Consecration and opening ceremony ===
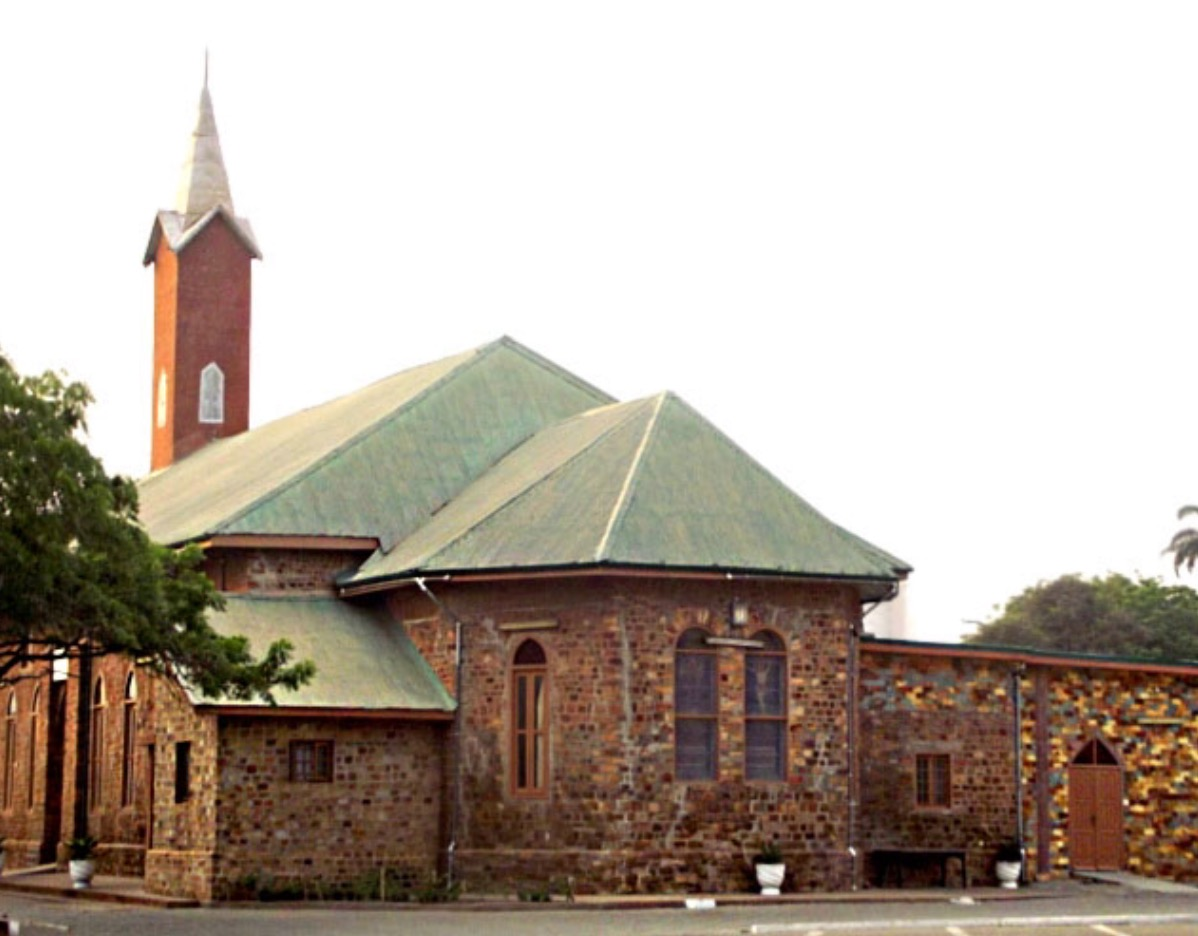
East wing of the Chapel with the extension, north and south vestries in view

The formal opening of the church was to take place on 19 October 1902. Old pews from the old chapel were transported to the new church. New pews were also built to fill the remaining space. The pulpit was a personal gift from Robert Richter Bannerman, a carpenter and the youngest Presbyter at the time. Affixed to the pulpit was an inscription on ebony wood taken from Psalm 119 verse 105 (KJV): “Thy word is a lamp unto my feet, and a light unto my path” with a black cross engraved above it. The altar was jointly designed by Bannerman and Epting but paid for by the Basel Mission pastor and historian, Carl Christian Reindorf. C.C. Reindorf's son Jonah Reindorf presented four hanging lights, each bearing five separate lamps, chandelier fashion to be used during evening services.

The Baptismal Font, made of mahogany was presented by the Basel Missionary, the Rev. Widmaer. Baptismal and Communion vessels were brought from Amanfong; and new cloths for covering the Altar, Pulpit and Baptismal Font were donated by the congregants. On Friday 17 October 1902, a Cement Tablet which is still in position today, was placed in the space above the main Entrance of the Church, bearing the inscription:

"EBEN-EZER 1902 1 Sam 7: 12"

The stone tablet inscription is a biblical reference to 1 Samuel 7:12 (NIV), "Then Samuel took a stone and set it up between Mizpah and Shen. He named it Ebenezer [stone of help], saying, 'Thus far the Lord has helped us'."

On Saturday, 18 October 1902 at 6 p.m., the church bells were tolled for the first time. Members from other mission stations from the Ga-Dangme district had also arrived for the ceremony earlier that week. On Sunday 19 October 1902, the boys of the middle boarding school, the Salem School marched through the Osu township in a pre-dawn musical procession led by the Missionary Schultze. A large crowd assembled at the ruined old chapel at Amanfong at 9am for a short farewell service. A Prayer of Thanksgiving was given by Samuel Wuta Ofei, a minister of the Basel Mission. A large crowd then processed to the new chapel led by the Basel missionaries and the African pastors in their clerical robes with the first three holding a Holy Bible as well as the Holy Vessels for Baptism and Communion. The ministers of the church were followed by Presbyters, primary and middle school children and the teeming masses of Christians from the Osu community. In attendance was the paramount chief of Osu, Nii Mantse with his entourage in their traditional regalia.

Karl Epting gave the introductory speech at the entrance before handing over the keys of the church to the most senior missionary at the time, Michael Seeger. Soliciting more funds went beyond the completion of the construction project. Per the Basel Report of the Dedication of the new church, Seeger made an appeal to friends in Basel for the donation of certain items of equipment and adornment for the new Church, explaining, “We are soliciting these from friends and well-wishers in our (home) country because our own members are now saddled with such a heavy debt due to the cost of the building that they will not be able to provide the money for them at the present time”. The church was filled to capacity with 1500 people. Later that afternoon, a special service was held with the Acting Governor of the Gold Coast, Capt. L.R.S. Arthur, C.M.G in attendance, together with his private secretary.

On the occasion of the Golden Jubilee of Osu Eben-Ezer Chapel building in 1952, the Architect and Builder, Karl Epting, then an old man in Basel, recalled in a congratulatory message:

“I look back with joy upon [the] ten years during which I was privileged to work in the Gold Coast. It was in 1902 that the task of building the Church at Christiansborg was entrusted to me and many willing helpers. I seem to see before my very eyes today all the carpenters, masons and carriers hard at work. Without them, I would not have been able to do the job. I send to all who remember me my hearty greetings.”

=== Facilities ===
Later additions to the chapel include the acquisition of a pipe organ as well as a chancel and an arch to separate the chancel from the nave of the chapel. Two vestries to the north and south of the chapel have also been constructed. Brass lecterns and tablets were also added to the church sanctuary. Over the years, the chapel has undergone renovations including the relocation of the belfry to the main grounds outside the chapel, the construction of a wall to fence the church campus, refurbishment of the upper gallery, re-roofing of lightweight aluminum sheets, placement of a ceiling, introduction of a chapel extension, the Carl Christian Reindorf Auditorium (originally known as the Shed) and replacement of the old pulpit with a terrazzo tiled concrete one. There is also a church hall on the chapel premises used primarily for social events and conferences. Within the main sanctuary, there are commemorative plaques to honour the early Basel and West Indian missionaries, the pioneer pastor-historian, Carl Christian Reindorf as well as other notable Presbyterian ministers of Osu and Emmanuel Charles Quist, the first Speaker of the Parliament of Ghana. The church administrative office, a Manse for the District Minister and residential apartments for the associate ministers and chaplains are adjacent to the church compound. The church owns and operates the private mission graveyard, the Basel Mission Cemetery in Osu, Accra which is opposite the Osu Cemetery (formerly known as Christiansborg Civil Cemetery) and near the Accra Sports Stadium. The church is also the owner of the Osu Presbyterian Preparatory School, established in 1975.

== Hierarchy and church groups ==
Four ministers are assigned to the church at any given time. The head minister is the district pastor assisted by three other associate ministers. There are also lay preachers and a group of elected presbyters known as the Session. There are several groups in the church which is common to the Presbyterian denomination: Young People's Guild (YPG), Young Adults’ Fellowship (YAF), Men's and Women's Fellowships, Bible Study and Prayer Group (BSPG), Children's Service, Boy's and Girl's Brigades, Junior Youth (JY), the Church Choir, Singing Band, the Ebenezer Melody Band and the International Bible Reading Association (IBRA).

== Notable congregants ==
- Gottlieb Ababio Adom, Gold Coast educator, journalist, editor and Presbyterian minister
- Ebenezer Amatei Akuete, Ghanaian diplomat
- Alexander Worthy Clerk, Jamaican Moravian missionary and teacher to Ghana
- Carl Henry Clerk, Gold Coast educator, administrator, journalist, editor, Presbyterian minister and fourth Synod Clerk, Presbyterian Church of the Gold Coast
- George C. Clerk, pioneering Ghanaian botanist and plant pathologist
- Jane E. Clerk, a schoolteacher and pioneer woman education administrator on the Gold Coast.
- Nicholas T. Clerk, Ghanaian academic, public administrator, Presbyterian minister and former Rector, GIMPA
- Nicholas Timothy Clerk - Gold Coast-born Basel missionary, theologian and first Synod Clerk, Presbyterian Church of the Gold Coast
- Matilda J. Clerk, second Ghanaian woman physician
- Pauline M. Clerk, civil servant, diplomat and presidential advisor
- Theodore S. Clerk, urban planner and first Ghanaian architect
- Solomon Ofei Darko, Mayor of Accra (2001–2003)
- Silas Dodu, Ghanaian academic, cardiologist and second Dean of the University of Ghana Medical School
- Charles Odamtten Easmon, first Ghanaian surgeon and first Dean of the University of Ghana Medical School
- Emmanuel Evans-Anfom, medical practitioner, academic and university administrator
- Chris Tsui Hesse, cinematographer, filmmaker, prison reform advocate and Presbyterian minister
- L. W. Fifi Hesse, first black African Rhodes Scholar, Director-General, Ghana Broadcasting Corporation (GBC), 1972–1974; 1984–1988 and Member, Public Services Commission of Ghana
- Regina Hesse, pioneer woman educator and school principal on the Gold Coast
- Virginia Hesse, civil servant and commercial officer at the Ministry of Trade and Industry, Ambassador of Ghana to the Czech Republic (2017–2021)
- Nii Ashie Kotey, academic, lawyer, Justice of the Supreme Court of Ghana and former Dean, Faculty of Law, University of Ghana, Legon
- Catherine Mulgrave, Angolan-born Jamaican pioneer woman educator, administrator and missionary
- Nii Amaa Ollennu, jurist, judge, Justice of the Supreme Court of Ghana, Speaker of the Parliament of Ghana in the Second Republic and acting President of Ghana from 7 August 1970 to 31 August 1970
- Emmanuel Noi Omaboe, also known as Oyeeman Wereko Ampem II, Ghanaian economist, public servant, businessman and traditional ruler, Chancellor of the University of Ghana, 1999–2005
- Emmanuel Charles Quist, barrister, judge and the first African President of the Legislative Council and first Speaker of the Parliament of Ghana
- Carl Christian Reindorf, Basel mission pastor and pioneer historian
- Fred T. Sai, family physician, academic and advocate of reproductive health
- Harry Sawyerr, politician and quantity surveyor
- George Peter Thompson, Liberian educator and first African Basel missionary
- Johannes Zimmermann, German missionary, translator, ethnolinguist and philologist

== See also ==
- Christ Presbyterian Church, Akropong
- Ramseyer Memorial Presbyterian Church
