= Gbeho =

Surname list

Gbeho is a surname of Anlo Ewe origin. Notable people with this surname include:

- Komla Dumor, Ghanaian journalist and broadcaster; his mother, Cecilia Dumor was from the Gbeho family, the daughter of Philip Gbeho and the sister of James Victor Gbeho
- Philip Gbeho, Ghanaian musician, composer and teacher best known for his composition of the Ghana National Anthem
- James Victor Gbeho, Ghanaian lawyer, politician and diplomat
- Mawuena Trebarh, Ghanaian business executive, her mother, Cecilia Dumor was from the Gbeho family, the daughter of Philip Gbeho and the sister of James Victor Gbeho
