= Ollennu (surname) =

Surname list

Ollennu is a patronymic surname of Ga-Dangme origins and typically associated with the La people of Accra, Ghana. Notable people with the surname include:

- Amerley Ollennu Awua-Asamoa, diplomat, Ambassador of Ghana to Denmark (2017–2021)
- Nii Amaa Ollennu (1906 – 1986), jurist, judge, Justice of the Supreme Court of Ghana, Speaker of the Parliament of Ghana in the Second Republic and acting President of Ghana from 7 August 1970 to 31 August 1970
- Ashitey Trebi-Ollennu, robotics engineer at the National Aeronautics and Space Administration (NASA) Jet Propulsion Laboratory and the chief engineer and technical group lead for the mobility and manipulation group; known for the Mars Rover and InSight projects
