= Matilda J. Clerk =

Ghanaian physician and science educator (1916–1984)

Matilda Johanna Clerk
- Matilda Clerk in Edinburgh, 1949
- Born: Matilda Johanna Clerk; 2 March 1916; Larteh, Gold Coast
- Died: 27 December 1984 (aged 68); Accra, Ghana
- Education: Achimota College; University of Edinburgh (MBChB); University of London (DTM&H)
- Occupations: Medical doctor; Science educator
- Known for: First woman in West Africa to attend graduate school and earn a postgraduate diploma; Second Ghanaian woman in orthodox medicine; Empowerment of women in Ghana; Public health outreach
- Parents: Nicholas Timothy Clerk (father); Anna Alice Meyer (mother)
- Relatives: Clerk family; Regina Hesse (grandaunt); Emmanuel Charles Quist (uncle)
- Awards: Gold Coast Medical Scholar
- Medical career
- Field: Maternal health; Paediatrics; Primary care; Public health

Matilda Johanna Clerk (2 March 1916 – 27 December 1984) was a medical pioneer and a science educator on the Gold Coast and later in Ghana as well as the second Ghanaian woman to become an orthodox medicine-trained physician. The first woman in Ghana and West Africa to attend graduate school and earn a postgraduate diploma, Clerk was also the first Ghanaian woman in any field to be awarded an academic merit scholarship for university education abroad. M. J. Clerk was the fifth West African woman to become a physician after Nigerian women, Agnes Yewande Savage (1929), the first West African woman medical doctor and Elizabeth Abimbola Awoliyi (1938); Irene Ighodaro (1944), the first Sierra Leonean female physician and Susan Ofori-Atta (1947), Ghana's first woman physician. These pioneering physicians were all early advocates of maternal health, paediatric care and public health in the sub-region. For a long time after independence in 1957, Clerk and Ofori-Atta were the only two women doctors in Ghana. By breaking the glass ceiling in medicine and other institutional barriers to healthcare delivery, they were an inspiration to a generation of post-colonial Ghanaian and West African female doctors at a time the field was still a male monopoly and when the vast majority of women worldwide had very limited access to biomedicine and higher education. Pundits in the male-dominated medical community in that era described Matilda J. Clerk as "the beacon of emancipation of Ghanaian womanhood."

== Early life and family ==
Matilda Johanna Clerk was born on 2 March 1916 in Larteh in the Akuapem Mountains, where her father, Nicholas Timothy Clerk (1862–1961) was stationed as a Basel missionary at the time. Her Basel-trained theologian father was the first Synod Clerk of the Presbyterian Church of the Gold Coast from 1918 to 1932. and a founding father of the all boys’ boarding high school, the Presbyterian Boys’ Secondary School, established in 1938. Her mother, Anna Alice Meyer (1873–1934) was of Ga-Danish heritage. Meyer was the cousin of Emmanuel Charles Quist (1880–1959), a barrister and judge who became the first African President of the Legislative Council from 1949 to 1951, Speaker of the National Assembly of the Gold Coast from 1951 to 1957 and Speaker of the National Assembly of Ghana from March 1957 to November 1957.

Her paternal grandfather, Alexander Worthy Clerk (1820–1906), a Jamaican Moravian missionary, arrived in the Danish Protectorate of Christiansborg (now the suburb of Osu) in Accra in 1843, as part of the original group of 24 West Indian missionaries who worked under the auspices of the Basel Evangelical Missionary Society of Basel, Switzerland. Alexander W. Clerk was a pioneer of the Presbyterian Church of Ghana and a leader in education in colonial Ghana, establishing a boarding middle school, the Salem School at Osu in 1843. Her paternal grandmother, Pauline Hesse (1831–1909) was from the Gold Coast, and was of Danish, German and Ga-Dangme ancestry. Her grandaunt was Regina Hesse (1832─1898), a pioneer educator and school principal who worked with the Basel Mission on the Gold Coast.

M. J. Clerk's older brothers were Carl Henry Clerk (1895–1982) and Theodore S. Clerk (1909–1965). She had six other siblings and belonged to the notable historical Clerk family of Accra, Ghana. Carl Clerk was an agricultural educationist, school administrator, editor, journalist and church minister who served as the fourth Synod Clerk of the Presbyterian Church of the Gold Coast between 1950 and 1954 and Editor of the Christian Messenger newspaper from 1960 to 1963. Theodore Clerk was the first Ghanaian architect who planned and developed the port city of Tema, while her older sister, Jane E. Clerk (1904–1999), a teacher, was a pioneer education administrator in colonial Ghana.

== Education and training ==
She had her primary and middle school education at Presbyterian schools at Adawso and Aburi respectively. At the Aburi all girls' middle boarding school Matilda Clerk attended until the end of 1931, the European missionary teachers dubbed her the "Dux of the School." M. J. Clerk matriculated at Achimota College in 1932. She received a Cadbury scholarship in 1934. At Achimota, she obtained a Second Division Teachers’ Preliminary Certificate (1935) and Cambridge Senior School Certificate with exemption from London Matriculation (1937).

Matilda Clerk was elected the Girls’ School Prefect in her senior year at Achimota. She was also a trained pianist and harpist; as a student, she excelled in sports. Among her interests were embroidery, art (painting) and gardening.

In 1942, Matilda Clerk became the first Ghanaian woman to complete the intermediate preliminary course in basic medical science, taking advanced courses in physics, chemistry, botany and zoology at Achimota. The British colonial government at that time effectively allowed only male students to participate in the programme. Thus, before the school permitted M. J. Clerk to enroll in the course in 1940, her father had to formally petition the then Governor of the Gold Coast, Arnold Wienholt Hodson for a special waiver. She was the only candidate, male or female, to pass the first preliminary medical baccalaureate examinations known as the 1st M.B., London, in 1942.

Based on her superior academic performance, she was awarded a rare medical scholarship by the colonial government to study medicine (MBChB) at the University of Edinburgh from 1944 to 1949. By winning the award, she became the first Ghanaian woman in the annals of history and in any field to secure a scholarship for higher education abroad. At Edinburgh, she was active in the Student Christian Movement and the International Club. The second Ghanaian woman and sixth West African woman (jointly with Annie Jiagge) to receive a university baccalaureate degree, M. J. Clerk was also the first woman in Ghana and West Africa to pursue postgraduate qualifications at a graduate school when she obtained a diploma in tropical medicine and hygiene (DTM&H) in 1950 from the London School of Hygiene and Tropical Medicine, a constituent college of the University of London; she returned to her homeland in January 1951.

=== Other pioneers in West Africa ===
In 1933, Sierra Leonean political activist Edna Elliot-Horton became the second West African woman higher education graduate and the first to complete a bachelor's degree in the liberal arts. Annie Jiagge, also an alumna of Achimota School and the first Ghanaian woman judge, completed her law degree at the London School of Economics in 1949. Many leading lights in the Gold Coast medical profession during that period, including her fellow pioneering colleagues, Charles Odamtten Easmon, Emmanuel Evans-Anfom and Susan Ofori-Atta, also attended Achimota School and the University of Edinburgh Medical School.

== Career ==
=== Science teacher ===
In between her teacher training/secondary education and preliminary medical course at Achimota, she was a science teacher at the Wesley Girls' High School from 1938 to 1940. She later taught biology for two years at her alma mater, Achimota School, from 1942 to 1944.

=== Medical doctor ===
Shunning a more lucrative private medical practice, she spent her entire career working in the public sector in the fields of primary care and public health. She was a medical officer and superintendent in the Gold Coast Civil Service. Hospitals she worked at include the Maternity Unit of Korle-Bu Teaching Hospital (1951–53), Kumasi Central Hospital (1954–57), Effia-Nkwanta Hospital, Sekondi (1957–62) and Tema General Hospital (1962–68). She was promoted to the rank of principal medical officer in 1969 and served for a time at the Princess Marie Louise Hospital for Women, now the Accra Children's Hospital with Susan Ofori-Atta. She also worked at the Health Education Division of the School of Hygiene in Accra from 1969 to 1971. She was the Senior Medical Officer at the Communicable Diseases, Maternal and Child Health Units of the Regional Medical Officer of Health's Office under the Ministry of Health in Accra from 1971 to 1973. She often acted as the Regional Medical Officer.

== Death and funeral ==
Matilda Clerk died suddenly, aged 68, on 27 December 1984 at her home in Osu, Accra. Her funeral service was held at the Ebenezer Presbyterian Church, Osu; her remains were buried in the church's graveyard, the Basel Mission Cemetery, also in Osu, Accra. The Ghanaian physician, scholar, university administrator and public servant Emmanuel Evans-Anfom delivered a eulogy at her funeral.

== Memorial and legacy ==
In 2024, a memorial mural of Matilda Clerk was unveiled at Nuffield House, Guy's Hospital in London, in recognition of her pioneering contributions to medicine and healthcare. In 2026, to mark its 300th anniversary, Edinburgh Medical School included Matilda Clerk among the 300 Faces of Edinburgh Medical School, recognising individuals who have shaped the School’s 300‑year history. As the anniversary celebrations, the medical school also featured her in an online exhibition, Kin: Four Family Histories.

== See also ==
- Timeline of women in science
- Women in medicine
