= Ghana Civil Service =

Government institution in Ghana

Agency overview
- Formed: 1960
- Jurisdiction: Government of Ghana
- Employees: 93,000
- Annual budget: GH¢ 33,173,838.00 GHS (2024)
- Agency executives: Dr Evans Aggrey Darkoh, Head of Ghana Civil Service; Mrs. Eunice Osae, Chief Director; Mr. Joseph Dome Chognuru, Director, Planning, Budgeting, Monitoring & Evaluation Directorate; Mrs. Elizabeth Obeng-Yeboah, Director for Recruitment, Training & Development Directorate
- Parent department: Controller and Accountant-General’s Department
- Website: https://ohcs.gov.gh

The Ghana Civil Service is the single largest employer in Ghana.

== History ==
The service was established to replace the Gold Coast Civil Service. The mission of the Civil Service, as stated in the Civil Service Law, 1993 PNDCL 327, “is to assist the Government in the formulation and implementation of government policies for the development of the country.” The following have occurred since the inception of the service;

1. Before the wars of 1914 - 1918, there were many indigenous people in many senior grade positions in the civil service.
2. In 1925 – 1926, Sir Gordon Guggisberg, the then Governor of the Gold Coast promulgated the first proposal for the development of indigenous civil service. This development was to increase the number of Africans holding high European positions and reduce the cost of employing Europeans and create a local machinery for accelerated development.
3. In 1941 a scholarship program was launched to further the Africanisation project.
4. 1948- an interim Public Service Commission was inaugurated to advice the Governor on the appointment and promotion in civil service.
5. In 1951, there was restructuring of government machinery and the establishment of statutory corporation to assume certain functions of government.
6. The Lidbury Committee report in 1951.
7. Upon attaining independence and republican status in 1957 and 1960 respectfully, various Ministries and Government Departments have been created, restructured or re-aligned to suit the needs of the times
8. In 1960, the Constituent Assembly passed the Civil Service Act, 1960 (CA.5). It provided for the following:
  - The creation of Civil Service posts,
  - The setting up of Ministries and Departments,
  - The appointment and retirement of Civil Servants, and for
  - The conditions of service, disciplinary proceedings and other matters relating to the Civil Service.
9. The Civil Service Act, 1960, was later complemented by the Civil Service (Interim) Regulations, 1960 (L1.47).
10. In 1993, the Civil Service Law, 1993 (PNDCL 327), was passed to replace the Civil Service Act, 1960 (CA.5).

== Functions ==
For the purpose of achieving its object under the law, the Service performs the following functions-PNDC Law 32;

- Initiate and formulate policy options for consideration of government;
- Initiate and advise on government plans;
- Undertake such research as may be necessary for the effective implementation of government policies;
- Implement government policies;
- Review government policies and plans;
- Monitor, co-ordinate and evaluate government policies and plans;
- Perform such functions as are incidental or conducive to the achievement of the object specified in this Law, and
- Perform such other functions as the Executive may direct.

== Mandate ==
PNDC Law 327 (7) of 1993 mandates the office of the civil service to undertake the following:

1. Ensuring efficiency of the service;
2. Having charge over all Civil Servants
3. Ensuring effective implementation of government policies and plans;
4. Advising government on employment and policy formulation within the Service;
5. Advising on conduct of management audits and review, and
6. Determining and advising on manpower limits for the Service.

== Institutes ==
The Office of the Head of Civil Service currently has three(3) training institutions which perform different but complementary services to help the office achieve its objectives. These institutes include;

1. Civil Service Training Centre
2. Government Training School
3. Institute of Technical Supervision
