= Emmanuel Charles Quist =

Gold Coast barrister, judge and first Speaker of the Parliament of Ghana

The Right Honourable Sir Emmanuel Charles Quist OBE, Kt
- Emmanuel Charles Quist

1st Speaker of the Parliament of Ghana
- In office 6 March 1957 – 14 November 1957
- Preceded by: New Position
- Succeeded by: Augustus M. Akiwumi

Speaker of the Gold Coast Legislative Assembly
- In office 6 March 1951 – 5 March 1957
- Preceded by: New Position
- Succeeded by: Position abolished on Independence

Personal details
- Born: 10 March or 21 May 1880 Accra, Gold Coast
- Died: 28 February or 30 March 1959 (aged 78–79); Accra, Dominion of Ghana
- Spouse(s): Lady Dinah Nita Quist (née Bruce; m. 1929)
- Relations: Clerk family
- Children: Paulina Quist; Dinah Quist
- Education: Basel Mission Seminary, Akropong; Middle Temple
- Occupation: Barrister; Educator; Judge

Sir Emmanuel Charles Quist, OBE, Kt also known as Paa Quist (21 May 1880, in Christiansborg, Accra – 30 March 1959) was a barrister, educator and judge who served as the first Speaker of the Gold Coast Legislative Assembly and the first Speaker of the Parliament of Ghana.

== Biography ==
=== Early life and ancestry ===
Emmanuel Charles Quist was born in 1880 in Christiansborg, Accra. He was the son of the Rev. Carl Quist (1843 – 99), a Basel Mission minister from Osu, Accra. His Ga-Danish mother, Paulina Richter, descended from the Royal House of Anomabo. Richter's ancestor was Heinrich Richter (1785–1849), a prominent Euro-African from Osu. Richter's descendants also included Philip Christian Richter (b. 1903), an academic and Presbyterian minister and Ernest Richter (b. 1922), a diplomat. Carl Quist was also of Ga-Danish ancestry and a son of one of the three Kvist brothers (anglicised to Quist) who came to the Gold Coast via Holland in 1840. The brothers, all ethnic Danes, settled separately in Cape Coast, Christiansborg and Keta. E. C. Quist was also related to the historically notable Clerk family of Accra, through his cousin, Anna Alice Meyer (1873 – 1934) whose husband was the theologian and Basel missionary, Nicholas Timothy Clerk (1862 – 1961).

=== Education and career ===
From 1889 to 1896, E. C. Quist had his primary and middle school education at the Basel Mission Grammar School and the boys' boarding school, the Salem School respectively. He then attended the Basel Mission Seminary, a theological seminary and teacher- training college at Akropong, Akwapim District where he received training in pedagogy and theology and graduated as a teacher-catechist. He served as the headmaster of his alma mater, the Salem School, Osu from 1899 to 1902. Quist resigned from the teaching profession to pursue a career in commerce. Briefly entering business with the Basel Mission Trading Company, he entered the Middle Temple in England in 1910 and was called to the Bar on 10 April 1913, along with Sir James Henley Coussey who later chaired the Constitutional Committee set up in December 1949 to draw up a new Constitution for the Gold Coast.

On his return from London, Quist enrolled as a barrister in private practice at the Gold Coast Bar, establishing his chambers in Accra. Quist became the first African Crown Counsel in the Gold Coast Civil Service, equivalent to the position of a State Attorney. He resigned from his position as a Crown Counsel within a year to focus on his work as a defence lawyer. He was a member of the Accra Town Council from 1919 to 1929. He was an extraordinary member of the Legislative Council in 1925, serving as a legal advisor to the Eastern Provincial Council of Chiefs. He was elected a member of the Legislative Council, representing the Eastern Province, from 1934 to 1948. He was appointed a member of the Achimota College Council.

A puisne judge at the Cape Coast judicature from 1948 to 1949, E. C. Quist was the first African President of the Legislative Council from May 1949 to 1951, Speaker of the National Assembly of the Gold Coast from 1951 to 1957, and Speaker of the National Assembly of Ghana from March 1957 until his retirement on 14 November 1957. During this period, his colleagues in parliament re-elected him as Speaker during the general elections of 1954 and 1956. The elevation of Quist in 1949 happened after the last Governor of the Gold Coast, Sir Charles Arden-Clarke relinquished his concurrent post as the President of the Legislative Council. Quist visited the British House of Commons in 1950. On 26 October 1950, he partook in the Speaker's Procession at the Palace of Westminster, as the official guest of the then Speaker, Douglas Clifton Brown, 1st Viscount Ruffside, during the opening of a new session that year. In 1957, he presided over the special state opening of Parliament on Ghana's Independence Day, 6 March, which was witnessed by several visiting international dignitaries including Princess Marina, Duchess of Kent, Queen Elizabeth II's special representative for the occasion as well as the then US Vice President Richard Nixon and the American civil rights activist, Martin Luther King Jr.

== Personal life ==
On 27 June 1929, Quist married Dinah Nita Bruce of Christiansborg, Accra. Dinah Bruce was from the prominent Bruce family of Accra whose members included Gold Coast physician and journalist, Frederick Nanka-Bruce as well as Ghanaian musician, King Bruce. Quist had two daughters Paulina Quist (Mrs. Clerk) and Dinah Quist (Mrs. Annang). Emmanuel Quist was a patron of a number of social clubs: the Accra Turf Club, the Rodger Club and the Boy Scouts Movement. Quist was also a member of the District Grand Lodge of Ghana.

== Death and state funeral ==
Upon Quist's death in 1959, the Ghanaian government accorded him a state funeral with full military honours. After the ceremony at the Ebenezer Presbyterian Church, Osu, his body was interred at the Osu Cemetery in Accra.

== Honours and legacy ==
Quist was created O.B.E. in 1942, "for public services in the Gold Coast," and Knighted in 1952."The Speakers' Conference Hall" at the Parliament House has been named after Sir Emmanuel Charles Quist. A commemorative plaque, sponsored by his wife, Lady Dinah Quist, was erected in his memory in the sanctuary of the Ebenezer Presbyterian Church, Osu where he was a congregant. The "Sir Emmanuel Charles Quist Street" in Accra was named in his honour.

Political offices
New title	Speaker of the Legislative Assembly of the Gold Coast; 1951 – 1957	Parliament of Ghana created at Independence
New title	Speaker of the Parliament of Ghana; 1957	Succeeded by Augustus Molade Akiwumi
