= Worawora =

Coordinates: 7°31′N 0°22′E

Worawora means
- Interactive map of Worawora means
- Country: Ghana
- Region: Oti Region

Worawora is a town in the Oti Region of Ghana. worawora means. A small town along kpando-Dambai stretch
