= Theodore S. Clerk =

Ghanaian architect and urban planner (1909–1965)

Theodore S. Clerk ARIBA, AMTPI, PGIA
- Born: Theodore Shealtiel Clerk; 4 September 1909; Larteh, Gold Coast
- Died: 15 November 1965 (aged 56); Tema, Ghana
- Education: Achimota College; Edinburgh College of Art
- Occupation: Architect
- Spouse: Paulina Quist (m. 1948)
- Parents: Nicholas Timothy Clerk (father); Anna Alice Meyer (mother)
- Awards: Rutland Prize
- Projects: City of Tema

Theodore Shealtiel Clerk, ARIBA, AMTPI, PGIA (4 September 1909 – 15 November 1965) was an urban planner on the Gold Coast and the first formally trained, professionally certified Ghanaian architect. Attaining a few historic firsts in his lifetime, Theodore Clerk became the chief architect, city planner, designer and developer of Tema which is the metropolis of the Tema Harbour, the largest port in Ghana. The first chief executive officer (CEO) of the Ghanaian parastatal, the Tema Development Corporation as well as a presidential advisor to Ghana's first head of state, Kwame Nkrumah, T. S. Clerk was a founding member and the first president of the first post-independent, wholly indigenous and self-governing Ghanaian professional body, the Ghana Institute of Architects (GIA), that had its early beginnings in 1963. He was also an Associate of the Royal Institute of British Architects and the Royal Town Planning Institute.

== Early life and family ==
Theodore Clerk was born in Larteh in the Akuapem Mountains on 4 September 1909, where his father, Nicholas Timothy Clerk (1862 – 1961) was stationed as a Basel missionary at the time. His father, a Basel-trained theologian, was the first Synod Clerk of the Presbyterian Church of the Gold Coast from 1918 to 1932. N. T. Clerk was a founding father of the all boys’ boarding high school, the Presbyterian Boys’ Secondary School established in 1938. His mother, Anna Alice Meyer (1873 –1934) was of Ga-Danish descent.

His paternal grandfather, Alexander Worthy Clerk (1820 – 1906), a Jamaican Moravian missionary arrived in the Danish Protectorate of Christiansborg (now the suburb of Osu) in 1843, as part of the original group of 24 West Indian missionaries who worked under the auspices of the Basel Evangelical Missionary Society of Basel, Switzerland. A.W. Clerk was a pioneer of the Presbyterian Church of Ghana and a leader in education in colonial Ghana, establishing a middle boarding school, the Salem School in 1843. His paternal grandmother, Pauline Hesse (1831–1909) was from the Gold Coast, and was of Danish, Ga and German descent. Theodore Clerk's grandaunt was Regina Hesse (1832 –1898), a pioneer educator and school principal.

T. S. Clerk had eight other siblings and was a member of the historically important Clerk family. His older brother, Carl Henry Clerk (1895 – 1982) was an editor, agricultural educationist and church minister who served as the fourth Synod Clerk of the Presbyterian Church of the Gold Coast from 1950 to 1954 as well as the Editor of the Christian Messenger newspaper between 1960 and 1963. Among his sisters were Jane E. Clerk (1904 – 1999), a pioneering woman education administrator along with Matilda Johanna Clerk (1916 – 1984), the second Ghanaian female medical doctor and the first Ghanaian woman in any field to be awarded an academic merit scholarship for university education abroad.

== Education and training ==
T. S. Clerk attended Basel Mission primary schools in Larteh Akuapem, the boys' boarding middle school, the Salem School at Osu and had his secondary education at Achimota College, as a member of one of the institution's earliest generations of students. He also took draughtsmanship or technical drawing lessons at the then Achimota College Engineering School where he was taught by Charles Deakin. At Achimota, Clerk's contemporaries included Kwame Nkrumah, Ghana's first president, R. P. Baffour, the first Vice-Chancellor of the Kwame Nkrumah University of Science and Technology (KNUST) as well as Charles Odamtten Easmon, the first Ghanaian surgeon.

Clerk secured a government scholarship for a diploma course in architecture at the Edinburgh College of Art, a constituent college of the University of Edinburgh where he attended from October 1938 to June 1943. Records of his nomination for admission to the professional associations for architecture and town planning suggest that he also completed a diploma in town planning in 1944. Theodore Clerk's nomination papers are housed at the Victoria and Albert Museum in London.

During the Easter term of 1941, Clerk was in Manchester on a vacation scholarship and later that summer in 1941, he undertook measuring work for the Scottish branch of the National Buildings Record. In the summer of 1942, he carried out a housing survey assignment for the Department of Health for Scotland.

Theodore Clerk passed the intermediate examination in June 1941 and the final examination in June 1943, and was admitted as an associate (ARIBA) by the Royal Institute of British Architects on 1 October 1943, with Frank Charles Mears, Leslie Grahame Thomson and John Ross McKay listed as his proposers. Furthermore, Clerk was also an Associate Member of the Royal Town Planning Institute (AMTPI).

== Career ==
In the summer of 1943, Clerk was awarded the Rutland Prize by the Royal Scottish Academy; an award which facilitated a critical study and tour of the Building Research Station in Garston and the Forest Products Research Lab in Princes Risborough, in addition to analysing the architecture, housing and town planning in London, Leeds, Liverpool and Coventry.

He joined the Town and Country Planning Department in Accra in 1946 and was later transferred to its Sekondi office from 1948 to 1953. For a time, Clerk was the only Ghanaian architect in the country and later, one of three Ghanaian architects in the late 1950s. He had been appointed the chief architect and town planner in the parastatal, Tema Development Corporation by 1954. By 1960, he had led the design, urban planning and development of the post-independent port city of Tema, a project commissioned by Ghana's first president, Kwame Nkrumah. In planning the first three Communities at Tema, Theodore Clerk led a team of English architects to design affordable, middle-class, standard houses, with four out of every five houses reserved for industrial workers, especially, low-income dockworkers at the harbour, who were facing a housing shortage at the time. The British architects who worked under Clerk were D. C. Robinson, D. Gillies-Reyburn, N. R. Holman, M. J. Hirst, W. D. Ferguson, C. Kossack, G. Rochford, D. B. Duck and H. G. Herbert. A few of these British architects were alumni of the Architectural Association School of Architecture in London, where they had taken courses in tropical architecture.

T. S. Clerk later became the first chief executive officer (CEO) of the Tema Development Corporation when an Act of Parliament, the Tema Development Corporation Act was passed in 1963, making the institution a publicly owned corporate entity. Theodore Clerk was also an external examiner at the Department of Architecture of the Kwame Nkrumah University of Science and Technology (KNUST).

Sometime in 1963, a group of about fifteen mostly British and American-trained Ghanaian architects came together to streamline the architectural practice, education and accreditation through a professional body, the Ghana Institute of Architects (GIA) as the successor of the pre-independence Gold Coast Society of Architects, a colonial social club for Gold Coast-based architects founded in August 1954. These architects were T. S. Clerk, D. K. Dawson, J. S. K. Frimpong, P. N. K., Turkson, J. Owusu-Addo, O. T. Agyeman, A. K. Amartey, E. K. Asuako, W. S. Asamoah, M. Adu-Donkor, K. G. Kyei, C. Togobo, V. Adegbite, M. Adu Bedu and E. Kingsley Osei. On Friday 11 December 1964 at 8:30 p.m., the inauguration of the body took place at the University of Ghana, Legon, where T. S. Clerk was elected the first president of the Ghana Institute of Architects, after which he gave his inaugural speech. Theodore Clerk also authored the first constitution of the Ghana Institute of Architects. T. S. Clerk had previously served as the president of the erstwhile Gold Coast Society of Architects during the British colonial era. Kwame Nkrumah later reassigned Theodore Clerk to the Ghanaian presidency as a senior advisor.

== Personal life ==
On 20 March 1948, Theodore Clerk married Paulina Quist, a midwife from Christiansborg, Accra, at the Ebenezer Presbyterian Church, Osu. Quist was the daughter of Emmanuel Charles Quist (1880–1959), a barrister and judge who became the first African president of the Legislative Council from 1949 to 1951, Speaker of the National Assembly of the Gold Coast from 1951 to 1957, and Speaker of the National Assembly of Ghana from March 1957 to November 1957. Clerk belonged to the District Grand Lodge of Ghana under the United Grand Lodge of England. T. S. Clerk was an organist and also served as a Presbyter and the Choir President of the Ebenezer Presbyterian Church, Osu.

== Death and legacy ==
Clerk died on 15 November 1965. T. S. Clerk's funeral service was held at the Ebenezer Presbyterian Church, Osu and his remains were buried at Accra's Osu Cemetery, previously known as Christiansborg Civil Cemetery. The Ghanaian government named a street in Tema, "T.S. Clerk Street", between Akojo School Park and Tweduaase Primary School at Site 6 of Community I, in his honour, in appreciation of his pioneering services to the development of Ghana.
