= Salem School, Osu =

Middle boarding school for boys

- Kukuhill, Osu; Greater Accra Region; Ghana

Information
- Other name: Osu Presbyterian Boys’ Boarding School; Osu Salem
- Former names: Basel Mission Middle School
- Type: Boys' boarding middle school
- Religious affiliation: Reformed Protestant
- Denomination: Presbyterian
- Established: 27 November 1843; 182 years ago
- Founder: Alexander Worthy Clerk; Catherine Mulgrave; George Peter Thompson; Basel Mission
- School district: Accra Metropolis
- Oversight: Ghana Education Service
- Grades: 7–9
- Age range: 12–15 years
- Enrollment: c. 300
- Campus type: Residential suburban

The Salem School, Osu, or the Osu Presbyterian Boys’ Boarding School or simply, Osu Salem, formerly known as the Basel Mission Middle School, is an all boys’ residential middle or junior secondary school located in the suburb of Osu in Accra, Ghana. The Salem School was the first middle school and the first boarding school to be established in Ghana. The school was founded under the auspices of the Basel Mission in 1843 and supervised by three pioneering missionaries and schoolmasters, Jamaican, Alexander Worthy Clerk and Angolan-born Jamaican Catherine Mulgrave together with the German-trained Americo-Liberian George Peter Thompson.

== History ==
On 27 November 1843, an English language Christian school, The Salem School was established at Osu by missionaries affiliated to the Basel Evangelical Missionary Society of Basel, Switzerland. Per the account of German church historian, Hans Werner Debrunner, the founders of the school were the missionaries West Indians, Alexander Worthy Clerk and Angolan-born Catherine Mulgrave of Jamaica in addition to the German-educated Americo-Liberian George Thompson. A decade and a half earlier, four Basel Missionaries of European heritage had arrived in the Danish Protectorate of Christiansborg in the Gold Coast. They were Germans, Karl F. Salbach, Gottlieb Holzwath and Johannes Henke as well as Swiss-born Johannes Gottlieb Schmidt who died from tropical diseases within a few months of their arrival. The Jamaican founders were among 24 West Indian missionaries recruited by the Danish minister, the Rev. Andreas Riis in 1843.

In nineteenth century colonial Ghana, Salem referred to the section of town inhabited by the European Christian missionaries of the Basel Mission. African Christian converts also lived in the Salem quarter. The concept of having a living quarters and a school was replicated in other towns on the Gold Coast including Akropong, Abokobi, Peki, La, Teshie, Odumase, Ada Foah, Kibi, Abetifi, Nsaba among others.

The inaugural class of the school, made up of 41 pupils (34 boys and 7 girls), was taken from the Danish language Christiansborg Castle School. The Christiansborg Castle School was a sister school of the Cape Coast Castle School that was established by the Anglican priest, the Reverend Thompson and the Society for the Propagation of the Gospel in Foreign Parts (SPG) affiliated to the Church of England. Danish was the medium of instruction at the Christiansborg School. The castle schools were established by the European Governors to educate the Euro-African mulatto children of European men and Gold Coast African women for eventual employment as Administrative Assistants in the colonial civil service.

In 1850, the British authorities bought the fort and castle belonging to the Danish authorities. Danish was no longer the lingua franca of Christiansborg and the English-language Salem School became the school of choice for the residents of the British colony. The school faced many challenging periods in the early years. The Basel Mission transferred Alexander Worthy Clerk in 1849 to Akropong to establish a similar Salem School there. When the locals of Osu refused to pay a poll-tax imposed by the British administration in 1854, colonial forces bombed the town using the warship, "H.M. Scourge" for two days which destroyed the existing infrastructure of the school and many private homes. As a result, the school together with the local Christian community in Osu relocated to Abokobi on the outskirts of the Ghanaian capital, Accra. By 1957, the original premises had been renovated and the school returned to Osu.

The layout of the Salem School was a quadrangle surrounded by student dormitories, classrooms, the headmaster's quarters and teachers’ bungalows. This architectural style ensured close supervision of pupils by the school authorities. The school maintained a disciplinary code which was strictly enforced. The code pertained to all spheres of school life including infractions such as lateness to class, disrespect, untidiness and absenteeism.

In the Gold Coast era, the four-year school curriculum included instruction in the Ga language and English. The development of the Ga curriculum was led by Johannes Zimmerman and Gold Coast historian, Carl Christian Reindorf who were influential in the translation of the Bible into the Ga language. Reindorf wrote The History of the Gold Coast and Asante which was published in 1895. Johannes Gottlieb Christaller worked on the translation of the Bible into the Twi language while Westermann translated the Bible into the Ewe language. Other subjects taught included English and Vernacular (Ga), Arithmetic, Geography, History, Religious Knowledge, Nature study, Hygiene, Handwriting and Music. Training in the arts and crafts was integral to the school curriculum: pottery, carpentry, basket and mat weaving. Daily church attendance and Sunday service at the Basel Mission Church (now Ebenezer Presbyterian Church, Osu) were required of all enrolled pupils.

In 1884, there were organisational reforms introduced by the new inspector of education for the Basel Mission schools, the Reverend Auer which streamlined the concept of the four-year middle boarding school. The educational model of the Salem School at Osu was the most rigorous in the Gold Coast colony until the introduction of the Accelerated Education Plan in 1951 by Kwame Nkrumah for the rapid expansion of access to education on the Gold Coast and later modern Ghana. In the colonial era, the school's alumni went on to become leaders in law, politics, public service, business, medicine, finance, engineering, artisanal craft and several other fields.

== Curriculum ==
Currently, the school offers a 3-year (9-term) basic curriculum according to the Ghana Education Service syllabus and preparing pupils for the Basic Education Certificate Examination (BECE) conducted by the West African Examination Council. The subjects taught include languages including English, French, Ghanaian languages such as Ga, mathematics, natural science, social studies, religious and moral education, basic design and technology (home economics, graphics & pre-technical skills), information and communications technology (ICT) and physical education.

== Notable alumni ==
- Gottlieb Ababio Adom, educator, journalist, editor and Presbyterian minister
- Ebenezer Akuete, former Ghanaian diplomat
- L.J. Chinery-Hesse, parliamentary draftsman, Solicitor-General and Acting Attorney General (1979)
- Carl Henry Clerk, educator, administrator, journalist, editor and Presbyterian minister
- George C. Clerk, botanist and plant pathologist
- Nicholas, T. Clerk, academic, administrator, Presbyterian minister and former Rector of the GIMPA
- Theodore S. Clerk, urban planner and first Ghanaian architect
- Silas Dodu, academic, cardiologist and second Dean of the University of Ghana Medical School
- Modjaben Dowuona, first Registrar of the University of Ghana; Minister for Education (1966–1969)
- Charles Odamtten Easmon, first Ghanaian surgeon and first Dean of the University of Ghana Medical School
- Emmanuel Evans-Anfom, medical practitioner and university administrator
- Vincent Birch Freeman, educationist and headmaster
- Chris Tsui Hesse, cinematographer, filmmaker, prison reform advocate and Presbyterian minister
- L. W. Fifi Hesse, first black African Rhodes Scholar, Director-General, Ghana Broadcasting Corporation (GBC), 1972–1974; 1984–1988 and Member, Public Services Commission of Ghana
- Nii Ashie Kotey – academic, lawyer and Justice of the Supreme Court of Ghana (2018–2023)
- George Tawia Odamtten, Ghanaian mycologist
- Nii Amaa Ollenu, jurist, judge and Speaker of the Parliament of Ghana in the Second Republic
- Emmanuel Charles Quist, barrister, judge and the first African Speaker of the Legislative Council and first Speaker of the Parliament of Ghana
- Carl Christian Reindorf, Basel mission pastor and pioneer historian
- Fred T. Sai, family physician, academic and advocate of reproductive rights
- Harry Sawyerr, politician and quantity surveyor

== Notable staff ==
- Gottlieb Ababio Adom, educator, journalist, editor and Presbyterian minister
- Alexander Worthy Clerk – Jamaican Moravian missionary and teacher
- Carl Henry Clerk, educator, administrator, journalist, editor and Presbyterian minister
- Catherine Mulgrave, Angolan-born Jamaican pioneer woman educator, administrator and missionary
- Emmanuel Charles Quist, barrister, judge and the first African President of the Legislative Council and first Speaker of the Parliament of Ghana
- Carl Christian Reindorf, historian and Basel Mission pastor
- George Peter Thompson, first African Basel missionary
- Johannes Zimmermann, German missionary and philologist

== Former headteachers ==
The following individuals were headmasters of the school:

Name	Tenure of office
George Peter Thompson	1843–46
Carl Christian Reindorf	1873
Jeremias Engmann	1873–75
Daniel Sabah	1876–77
Bernard Anyai Martinson	1877–78
Willams T. Evans	1878–88
Christian Briandt	1888–91
Ludwig L. Richter	1891–94
Edward M. Ablorh	1894–96
Frederick Hesse	1896–99
Emmanuel Charles Quist	1899–02
Andrew A. Holm	1902–03
R. T. Jones	1903–04
Joel E. Sonne	1904–08
Paul G. Djoleto	1908–11
Herman N. Annang	1912–18
Andrew A. Holm	1919–26
Edward M. Dodu	1927–32
Carl Henry Clerk	1933–35
Seth E. Lamptey	1942–43
Abraham M. O. Ayettey	1944–48
Benjamin E. K. Lokko	1949–50
Christian C. P. Mohenu	1951–52
D. P. Glover Akpey	1953–54
Gottlieb Ababio Adom	1955–58
Gershon N. Kumah	1959–62
Edmund A. Barnor	1962–73
Christian B. Ashong	1973–85
Emmanuel A. Amarkwei	1986–99
Eugene Okantey	1999–03
Isaac A. Brown	2003–16

== See also ==
- Akrofi-Christaller Institute
- Education in Ghana
- Presbyterian College of Education, Akropong
- Presbyterian Women's College of Education
- Trinity Theological Seminary, Legon
