= Osu, Accra =

Suburb of Accra, Ghana

Osu District
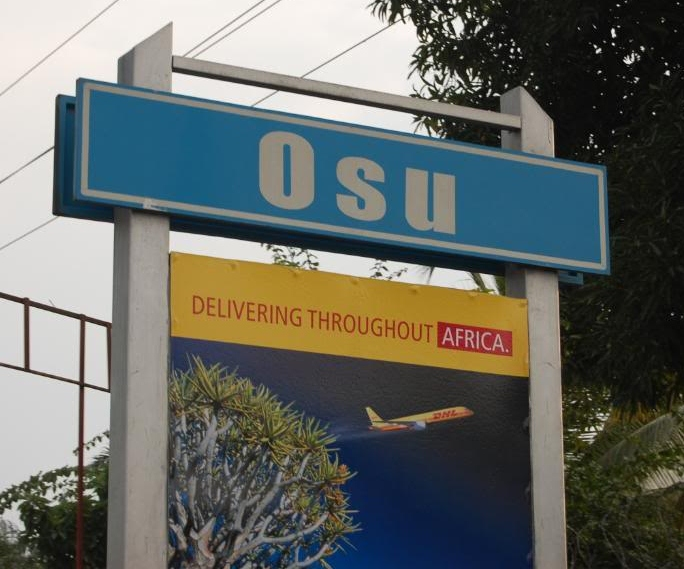
- Location: Roughly: W: Independence Avenue; SW: Castle Road/Sir Emmanuel Charles Quist Street; N/NE: Ring Road East; S: Gulf of Guinea
- Coordinates: 5°33′14″N 0°10′30″W
- Governing body: Korley Klottey Municipal Assembly

Osu is a neighbourhood in central Accra, Ghana, West Africa. It is located about 3 kilometres (1.9 mi) east of the central business district, and is locally known as the "West End" of Accra. Bounded to the south by the Gulf of Guinea, Osu's western boundary is the Independence Avenue. Osu is separated from the northern district of Labone by Ring Road. Due to its establishment as a settlement in the 17th century, Osu has a mix of houses dating from the early 20th century and modern office towers.

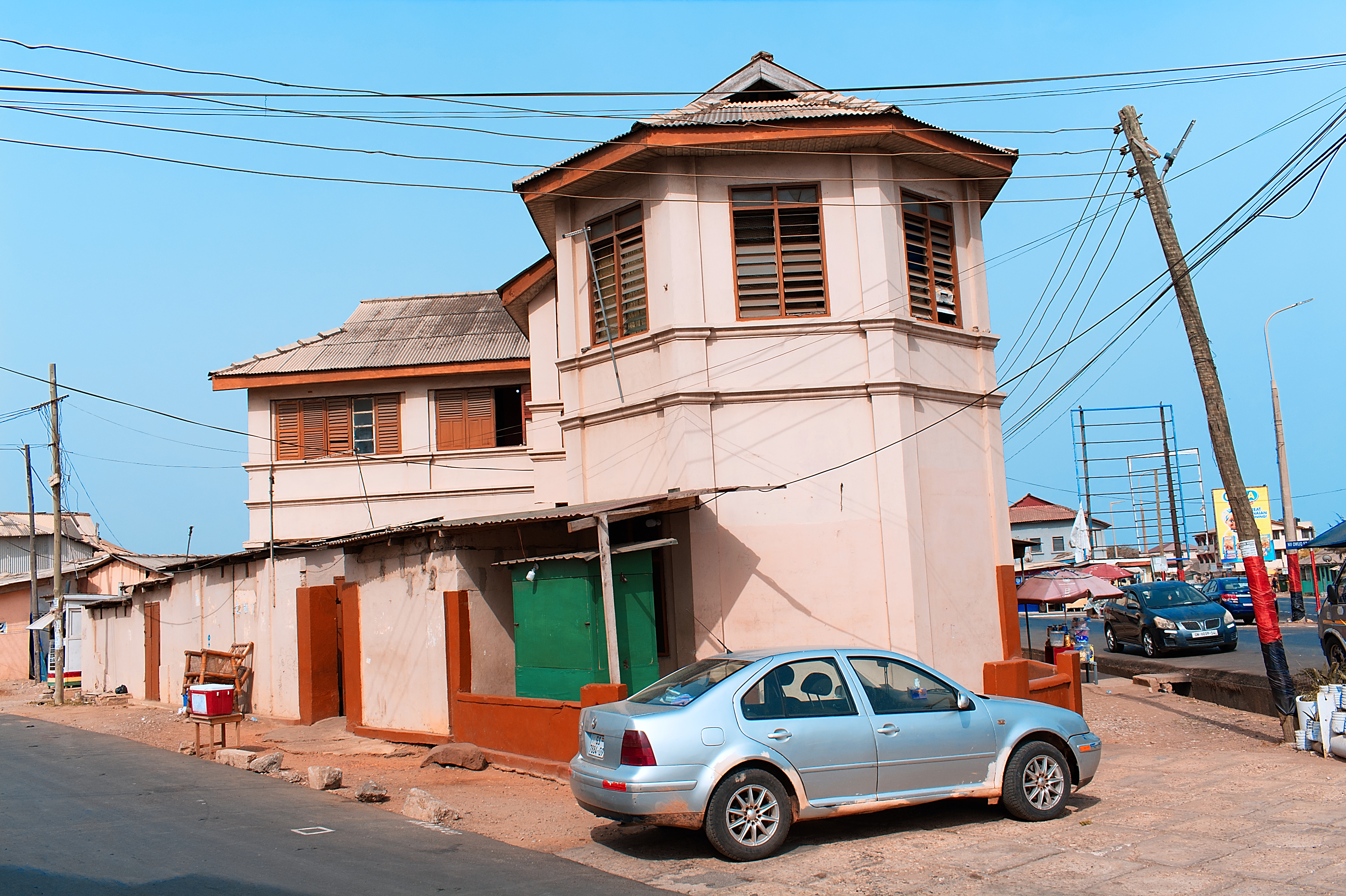
A colonial one-storey house in Osu

== Economy ==
The head office of Starbow was in Osu.

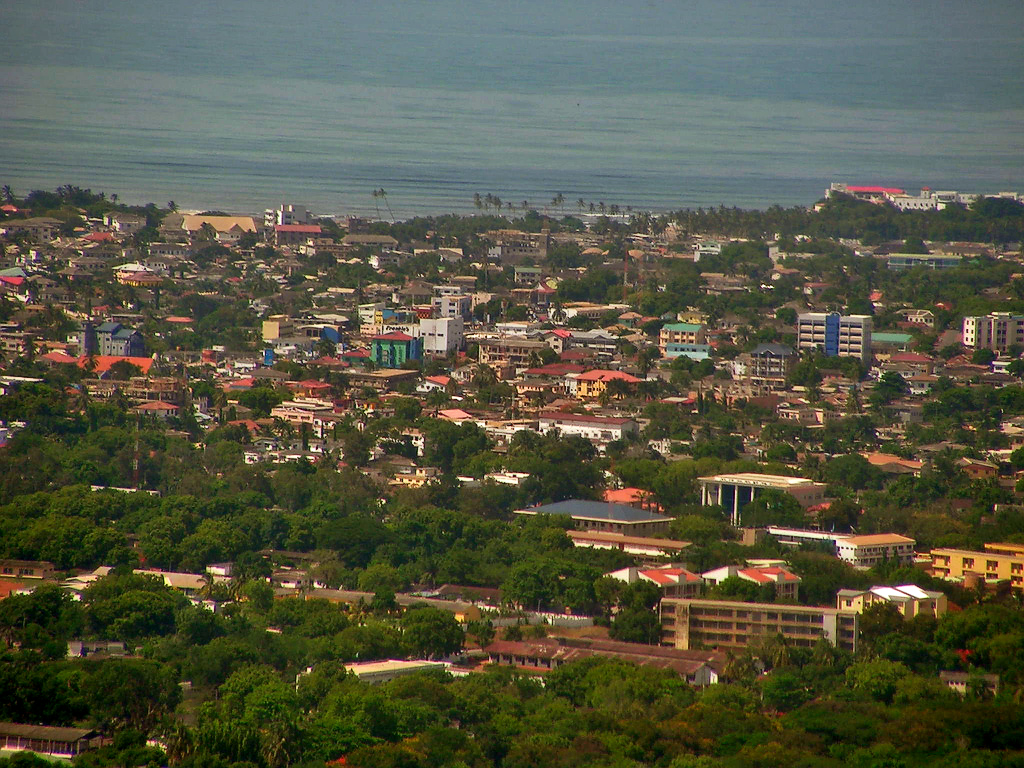
Aerial view

== Landmarks/places of interest ==
- Accra International Conference Center
- Accra Ridge Church
- Accra Sports Stadium
- Black Star Square
- Ebenezer Presbyterian Church, Osu
- Independence Arch
- Osu Castle (also known as Fort Christiansborg)
- Parliament House of Ghana
- Ridge Church School
- Greater Accra Regional Hospital
