= Rose Akua Ampofo =

Ghanaian educator and Presbyterian minister

The Reverend Rose Akua Ampofo
- Rose Akua Ampofo
- Born: 8 May 1948; Asikam, Gold Coast
- Died: 14 March 2003 (aged 54); Peru
- Education: Presbyterian Training College, Akropong
- Occupations: Minister; Teacher

Ecclesiastical career
- Church: Presbyterian Church of Ghana
- Offices held: 1st Director, Presbyterian Women's Training Centre; (1992 – 2002); Head of the Women and Gender Desk, Mission 21 (2002 – 2003)

Orders
- Ordination: Ramseyer Training Centre at Abetifi, 1990

Rose Akua Ampofo (8 May 1948 – 14 March 2003) was a Ghanaian educator and gender advocate who became the first woman in Ghana to be ordained a Presbyterian minister. Between 1992 and 2002, she was the founding Director of the Presbyterian Women's Training Centre (PWTC) at Abokobi. From October 2002 until her death in March 2003, she was the Head of the Women and Gender Desk of Mission 21, formerly known as the Basel Mission in Basel, Switzerland.

== Early life and education ==
Rose Akua Ampofo was born on 8 May 1948 at Asikam in the then Eastern Province of the Gold Coast. She had a difficult childhood and was raised by a foster family in Kyebi, also in the Eastern Region. She attended Abuakwa State College at Kyebi for her secondary education. She was educated at the Presbyterian Training College, Akropong, where she studied pedagogy and qualified as a teacher. She trained as a catechist in Scotland. In 1990, at the age of 42 years, she participated in the special ministerial training course at the Ramseyer Training Centre at Abetifi and was ordained a Presbyterian minister, the first woman to achieve that distinct position in the male-dominated Clergy of the Presbyterian Church of Ghana.

== Career ==
Ampofo was an educator for five years after she graduated from the teacher's college. Between 1980 and 1985, she was an ecumenical fellow and fraternal worker in Germany where she became fluent in German. She was once interviewed on German TV and conducted the entire exchange in German. After her ordination in 1990, she served as a minister in several Presbyterian churches around the country. She was later appointed the General Secretary of the Presbyterian Women's Fellowship and helped shape the women's ministry and mobilise seed funding through local meetings for the eventual establishment of the PWTC. She was also General Secretary of the Women's Work Central Committee of the Presbyterian Church of Ghana. Other sources of funding came from Presbyterian churches and groups in New York and Southern Germany. In 1992, she established the Presbyterian Women's Training Centre at Abokobi with the capacity to host 120 guests, particularly women from all denominations. In the PWTC's early days, Ampofo was helped by Gertrude Beller, a German colleague. At the PWTC, she worked on women's issues relating to education of the girl-child, economic empowerment and domestic violence against women and children.

She often remarked in the Twi language, “Onipa yɛ mɔbɔ,” meaning “Human beings deserve sympathy.” She believed in a practical approach to theology and Christian ministry, noting that “Faith must change people’s lives to make them better,” and concluded that “I have helped others to find freedom they needed to create a future for themselves.” Highlighting the important role of women's education and economic empowerment, Rose Akua Ampofo once noted, “It’s the woman’s womb which bears the man,” juxtaposing it with a Ghanaian proverb, “A house without a woman is an abandoned house and the fire has gone out, too.”

In her role as the Director of the PWTC, she provided technical, material and informational resources to train women for gender-oriented development in leadership, communication, business and finance. In partnership with local and international non-governmental organisations (NGOs) such as the EZE, she organised women's workshops on healthy living, sustainable development and the environment and on the HIV/AIDS pandemic. The centre also became a refuge for abused Ghanaian women. Her years at Abokobi have been described as the “Abokobi Miracle” as it was through her organisational abilities that made the centre fully functional despite challenges encountered in the first few years. In the 1990s, she hosted the then First Lady of Ghana, Nana Konadu Agyemang-Rawlings and a delegation from 31 December Women Movement, as part of a women's empowerment retreat.

== Personal life ==
She remained unmarried throughout her life and had no offspring of her own. Nonetheless, she cared for about 10 children, mostly from her extended family, making her an example of social motherhood in Ghana.

== Death and funeral ==
Rose Akua Ampofo died tragically in a motor accident on 14 March 2003, while on a business project to South America, in the Peruvian mountains, after her car plunged into a river. Also killed in the car accident was her predecessor at Mission 21 gender desk, Johanna Eggimann. Her funeral service was held at Abokobi in May 2003 and was officiated by the then Moderator of the Presbyterian Church of Ghana, the Rt. Rev. Dr. Sam Prempeh. The ceremony was attended by about 5000 people from Ghana, Zimbabwe, Canada, South Korea, the Netherlands, Germany and Switzerland. Many Ghanaian women from towns and villages went to her funeral. Her friend, the academic, Esther Ofei-Aboagye, eulogised her, “Rose was an overcomer.”

== Legacy and memorials ==
In 2015, the women's wing of the Presbyterian Church of Ghana instituted the annual “Rose Akua Ampofo Memorial Lectures” at Abokobi, in her honour and in recognition of the role she played in Ghanaian women's empowerment. Ampofo's leadership also embodied Christian womanhood, emphasising the increasing role women from the Global South play in shaping Christianity for economic development. In 2019, she was posthumously honored together with Dr JB Danquah, William Ofori-Attah and others for their input in the establishment and expansion of the Akyem Abuakwa Presbytery and the Presbyterian Church of Ghana.

== Literature ==
- Rose Akua Ampofo, "The Role of Religious Organisations in Developing Women’s Capacity: A Case of the Presbyterian Women’s Centre," in Florence Abena Dolphyne and Esther Ofei-Aboagye, Experiences in Capacity Building for Ghanaian Women, Accra: Asempa Publishers, 2001, 90-107
- Rose Akua Ampofo (RAA) Memorial Lectures, Volume 1, Accra: Asempa Publishers, 2019
