= Fritz Ramseyer =

Swiss missionary and builder

The Reverend Friedrich Augustus Louis Ramseyer
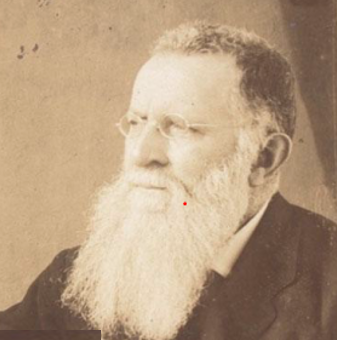
- Fritz Ramseyer
- Born: 7 October 1840; Neuchâtel, Switzerland
- Died: 6 August 1914 (aged 73); Switzerland
- Education: Basel Mission Seminary
- Occupations: Clergyman; Missionary; Builder
- Spouses: Rosa Louise Bontemps (m. 1866; died 1906); Elisa Uranie Bornand (m. 1908)
- Children: 8
- Parents: Louis Adolph Ramseyer (father); Marie Wuersten (mother)

Ecclesiastical career
- Church: Basel Evangelical Missionary Society

Orders
- Ordination: Basel Minster, 1875

Friedrich Augustus Louis Ramseyer also Fritz Ramseyer (7 October 1840 – 6 August 1914) was a Swiss-born Basel missionary, who was captured by the Asante in 1869 in colonial Ghana, together with his wife Rosa Louise Ramseyer (née Bontemps), Basel mission technical staff, Johannes Kühne and French trader, Marie-Joseph Bonnat. Ramseyer was later released in 1874 and pioneered the Christian mission in Kumasi and the rest of Asante. Additionally, he spearheaded the planting of churches in Abetifi. Apart from his evangelism, Ramseyer was instrumental in the expansion of opportunities in the fields of education, artisan industry training, land acquisition for building design and manpower development in the areas he lived and worked in.

== Early life and education ==
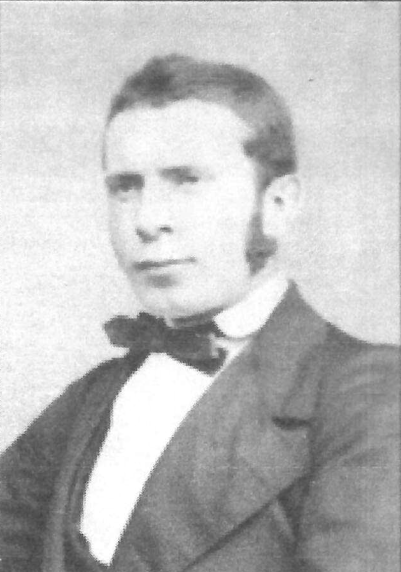
Fritz Ramseyer

Friedrich "Fritz" Augustus Louis Ramseyer was born on 7 October 1840, in Neuchâtel in the Francophone region of Switzerland. Dating to 1646, Ramsyer's ancestry can be traced to the Emmental in the canton of Bern, known for its cheese-making industry. There is a village named Ramsei in Emmental, a valley in West Central Switzerland surrounded by limestone-rich ranges of the Jura Mountains. The Kwahu mountain range in Ghana is analogous in topography to the Jura Mountains.

At the age of eighteen, he studied German at a college where he became interested in missionary work and was involved in a Christian Youth Group, before completing his mandatory military service. Taking after his father who was a building contractor, Ramseyer trained as a builder and a mason in his hometown. In 1861, when he was twenty-one years old, he proceeded to the Basel Mission Seminary in Basel, Switzerland, to train as a mission technical staff. In 1864, Fritz Ramseyer arrived on the Gold Coast for the first time to assist the mission in its structural work, completing the construction of the Basel Mission Seminary buildings at Akropong. The Basel Mission then appointed Ramseyer the principal of the boys’ middle school at Akropong, where he began to learn the Twi language. He was later ordained a Protestant minister during a furlough home in 1875.

== Work on the Gold Coast ==
=== Socio-political context ===
In 1865, the British colonial government was contemplating abandoning the Gold Coast as a colony due to perceived economic unviability in the impenetrable forested middle belt of Ghana. Eager to keep its missionary presence on the Gold Coast, the Basel Mission Home Committee assigned one of its missionaries, Elias Schrenk (1831–1913), on a fact-finding and diplomatic task; proving to Westminster that the development of infrastructure, particularly roads would open up the natural resource-rich forest Akan hinterland. He sailed to London and argued his case before the parliamentary committee after petitioning the Colonial Secretary. Schrenk was successful in his mission and the Gold Coast remained a British colony.

Between 1854 and 1859, Elias Schrenk studied at the Basel Mission Seminary in Switzerland before embarking to Ghana, where he lived until 1872. Schrenk, a believer in Pietist faith healing, was the General Treasurer of the Basel Mission Trading Company in Christiansborg and later experimented with cocoa planting in the early 1870s in Ghana. Gravely ill in 1858, Schrenk had visited faith healers in Germany, Johann Blumhardt at Bad Boll and subsequently Dorothea Trudel at Mannedorf between 1858 and March 1859, where he was fully healed.

In mapping out a route to Kumasi, the missionaries considered two options. Firstly, they sought to build up a focal station in Kyebi, the capital of the humid and densely forested Akyem area – a region with a non-conducive climate to European missionaries. The Akyem paramount chieftain or Okyehene, Nana Amoako Atta I, was hostile to the work of the Basel missionaries. Atta owned 100 to 200 slaves who had converted to Christianity and had been freed by the British colonial authorities. Amoako Atta lost his revenue as a result. Eventually, he was exiled to Nigeria on charges of cruelty. The chief in turn accused the converts of pilfering £3500. After his sudden death, Christians were banished from the town and the chiefdom seized the mission station and chapel using them as the new king's official residence and durbar hall respectively. Amid various skirmishes, colonial soldiers stormed the town and restored law and order, leading to the eventual flourishing of the mission at the beginning of the twentieth century.

The alternative chartered route to Asante was through the Northern Kwahu Mountains, where the Basel missionaries had set up a mission station. The insights into the terrain were gleaned by Fritz and Rosa Ramseyer during their capture in 1869 by the Asante army during their forced march from Anum, located on the Volta River's eastern bank to Kumasi, via the Kwahu State where the mountain range is situated. Thus, they were able to acquaint themselves with the topography during the journey to the Asante capital. Earlier in 1868, Fritz and Rosa Ramseyer were sent to Anum to aid in the operationalisation of the new mission station there. Their captivity also allowed them to observe firsthand Asante geography, culture, customs, political philosophy and statecraft. Based on their experiences, the Ramseyer couple were well suited to act as consultants to the Basel Mission as the society made plans for establish a mission station in Asante.

The subsequent propagation of the Gospel in Kumasi, by the Basel missionaries paved the way for mission work in the western and northern parts of the country until World War I. The mission had a presence at Yendi – homeland of the Dagomba people, by 1913 and were in the early stages moving eastwards towards Northern Togoland. There were pockets of Christian communities along the away that had been pioneered by native alumni of Basel mission –education system along the coast. An example of a town that had Christian coverts, was Tamale, a town that had 6000 inhabitants in 1914. On 25 December – Christmas Day, passages from the Nativity of Jesus were narrated in the Dagbani language for the first time.

The First World War terminated the activities of the Basel mission on the Gold Coast as the Germans were opponents of the British during the war. The Basel missionaries who were mostly German or Swiss German were expelled from the colony. The Colonial Secretary wrote to G. Zurcher, the General Superintendent of the Basel Mission on the Gold Coast on 10 December 1917 with a deportation order. A propaganda piece by now-defunct Cape Coast-based newspaper, the Gold Coast Leader published in May 1917 accused the German missionaries of "seeking to persuade the people of the inevitability of a German victory." The missionaries were summoned to Accra in the second week of December 1917 and deported on 16 December 1917. Eight missionaries, six Swiss, one Australian and one American, were forced to leave the Gold Coast. They were H. Stricker who was in charge of the Akropong College, G. Zurcher and H. Dewald at Christiansborg, P. Dieterle at the Abokobi station, E. Scherrer of the Aburi station, N. Rhode and H. Henking at Abetifi and F. Jost at the Kumasi station. On 12 January 1918, it became unlawful for any European missionary to remain in Akuapem. By 2 February 1918, the Secretary of State in London had ordered all Basel missionaries to exit the Gold Coast with immediate effect. The colonial government also confiscated all Basel mission assets on the Gold Coast.

Missionaries from the United Free Church of Scotland, who were then based in Calabar, Nigeria took over the operations of the Basel mission's practice in Ghana. A new structure was set up handing over administration of the mission to Ghanaians, under a new name, the Presbyterian Church of the Gold Coast.

=== Life in captivity ===
On 12 June 1869, Fritz and Rosa Ramseyer, together with their nine-month old son, Fritzchen, were captured by the Asante troops led by the army captain, Aduboffour while on their first official assignment in Anum. Ramseyer and his family had arrived in Anum on 29 December 1868. He was put in charge of the mission station and the church there. The Asante army were in Anum at the behest of the Akwamuhene to join the war against the Krepis, now Peki in 1868. The Asante army defeated the Anum commune in the tribal conflict. The Akwamu used the war against Peki to punish their neighbour, Anum. On rumours of war in Anum, Ramseyer noted in his diary, "We scarcely believed anything we heard, and concluded that as there was still a mixed population of young and old left in the town, the danger could not be imminent." The Ramseyers hoped the cordial relationship between them and the natives of Anum would insulate them from the war. He believed that the enemy was only interested in material wealth so he hid jewellery and about £200 in the backyard garden. Ramseyer further stated, "No idea of imprisonment or captivity in Coomassie [Kumasi] ever occurred to us." His fellow missionaries in Ho were willing to host Rosa Ramseyer and their baby but she refused to leave her husband given the uncertainties. Also taken in as captive of the Asante was the Brother Johannes Kühne, a Prussian who was a technical mission staff of the Basel Mission whose main responsibility included the industrial processing and export of cotton from the Gold Coast to Europe. The main site of the cotton ginning was Labolabo, a village near Anum. The Ramseyers and Kühne were taken on foot from the Volta Region through the Afram Plains and the Kwahu Range and finally to the Asante capital, Kumasi.

After several weeks of walking, the captives arrived on the outskirts of Kumasi in a small hamlet called Abankoro, where they were joined by the French merchant, Marie-Joseph Bonnat who had been captured in Ho, a few miles from the Ghana-Togo frontier. Abankoro was a transit point for prisoners as Asante customs required waiting there for many weeks or months before the captives were presented before the Asante king. The prisoners were housed in a traditional hut which Fritz Ramseyer christened "Ebenezer", meaning "Thus far the Lord had brought us". The name, Ebenezer, became commonplace in Ghana for religious buildings such as the stone-built Ebenezer Presbyterian Church, Osu which was constructed by the Basel Mission in 1902. A small museum was built next to the central shrine of Abetifi by the Ghana Museums and Monuments Board as a testament of the first dwelling of the Ramseyers at Abetifi and a symbol of interreligious dialogue between traditionalists and Christians.

At Abankoro, the Asante soldiers removed the iron shackles around the captives’ ankles which had become sore from the long trek. At this point, their clothing and footwear were completely worn out and in tatters. The absence of proper washing and soap resulted in skin rashes. Carbuncles festered on Rosa Ramseyer's scalp as she had no access to a hair comb and a pair of scissors. The captives were also bitten by several insects along the way. The escort leader of the prisoners, Ageana was noted for his cruelty. The missionaries wrote accounts of the reception of local chiefs and their subjects as they passed through the towns and villages within the Gold Coast territory. Fritzchen Ramseyer, the infant son of the Ramseyers died from malnutrition when the party was close to Juaben/Asokore. His remains were buried under a banana tree on the periphery of Asokore, in the infant cemetery. To the Ramseyers, they perceived their son's death as "God's will".

The prisoners trekked through Kwahu/Tafo and Bokuruwa, a rocky terrain characterized by chiselled basalt. The group stopped in Abetifi for two days for a brief respite. At Abetifi, they were warmly received by the paramount chief and the townsfolk. On arrival at their final destination, Kumasi, they were allocated a former Methodist station for lodging. They were treated with respect by the Asantehene, Otumfuo Kofi Karikari who periodically sent the political prisoners the occasional sheep, food items and gold dust equivalent to £9 when the Asantehene celebrated the adae festivals bi-weekly. On 12 January 1871, Ramseyer celebrated the Adae festival where he paid his respect to the third court of the palace. The Asante stool gave the captives a parcel of land for farming. The Asantehene realised that Bonnat and Ramseyer had the technical know-how in advanced building technology and used them to construct stone lodges. Some scholars have posited that the Asante king must have realised that the missionaries were not mercenaries trading in ammunition to enemy states of the Asante. The Basel Mission policy did not allow its agents to sell arms. The European hostages were used as political pawns in the Anglo-Ashanti impasse. Though the British Governor attempted to negotiate their freedom, he was hindered by the fact that the missionaries were not British subjects. Secondly, they were captured in commune east of the Volta River which was under German rule at the time. The Asante kingdom proposed a ransom of £2000 and later reduced the fee to £1000. Ramseyer rejected this option since in his view, paying a ransom in exchange for their freedom "would only reinforce the immoral habit of abducting people for ransom." The negotiations stalled for almost half-a-decade. However, the Asante permitted them to preach on a limited basis and start an infant school.

In the royal household at the Manhyia Palace, the missionaries found a diplomatic ally in Owusu Ansa, a Western-educated prince whose father, Osei Bonsu (1801–1824) had been the Asantehene. Owusu Ansa had previously been handed over to the British as surety in a peace accord that was signed by the British and the Asante authorities at the conclusion of one of the many Anglo-Asante wars of that era. He was then taken to England where he was baptised in the Anglican faith and received formal education. On his return to his homeland, Kumasi in 1841, he assumed a new role as a diplomatic envoy between the British Governor and the Asantehene. As the de facto ambassador of the Ashanti in Cape Coast, he was the intermediary through whom the prisoners could receive presents and letters from their families and friends in Europe. Drawing on his interactions with Wesleyan missionaries whose schools had to close at Cape Coast due to lack of adult enrollment, Owusu Ansa advised Ramseyer to start an infant school and a nursery for the church instead.

In captivity, Ramseyer ate local foods like the Asante delicacy, fufu and used local accessories such as a traditional stool, local water bottle and a large calabash used for bathing. He also became socially acquainted to the traditional festivals and customs. As a missionary, he co-existed with fetish priests in Kwaso and Abetifi. He also used shrine drums as a call to worship in his preaching as a prisoner in Asante which proved an effect method in proselytism. He also pioneered the propagation of the Gospel to royal courtiers in the "Mission to Palace" initiative which is now a contemporary feature of the Presbyterian Church's ministry in Asante.

In 1871, David Asante, the first native Akan missionary of the Basel Mission was sent on a fact-finding expedition in Begoro, north of Kyebi, one of the divisions of the Akyem Abuakwa State to gather details about Ramseyer and Kühne. Nothing came of this activity. David Asante later visited Kumasi, where he met Ramseyer when the latter was working as a free missionary.

The missionaries were finally considered for release in January 1874, when it became clear the Asante army had lost a key battle against the British, more commonly known as the Sargrenti War (1873–74) led by Sir Garnet Wolseley, an Anglo-Irish field marshal. Approximately 2500 British troops burned down Kumasi on 4 February 1874. The Asante king ordered the release of the Basel missionaries as they were no longer useful political prisoners. As part of the reparation settlement, the vanquished Asante kingdom was required to pay the victor, the British, fifty thousand ounces of gold.

The capture of the Protestant missionaries made international news in German-speaking areas of Europe. Marie-Joseph Bonnat's magnum opus, a record of his years in captivity was found in 1979 in an attic in his old family lodge in his hometown, Grièges in the French department of Ain. The content of the manuscript validated the Ramseyers’ accounts of their captivity, even though the narrative was written from two perspectives, that of a Swiss Protestant missionary and a Catholic French trader/prospector, united by a strong belief in Christian teaching. The work was edited by Albert van Dantzig and Claude-Hélène Perrot and published as Marie-Joseph et les Ashanti in 1994. Johannes Kühne, whose health deteriorated in captivity, was immediately repatriated to Europe after their liberation in 1874. Later, the diaries of Ramseyer/Kühne, translated into French and English, were published in Europe and the books became instant bestsellers. In Ramseyer's diary, he noted that he witnessed 2000 to 3000 slaves, prisoners of war and criminals being used as human sacrifices during his years in captivity in Kumasi. Though their stories were not the first European account of the culture and politics of the Asante, they provided a personable anthropological narrative as observed by the captives. The earliest illustration of the Asante by a European was carried out by the British envoy, Thomas Edward Bowdich in 1817.

=== Missionary activities ===
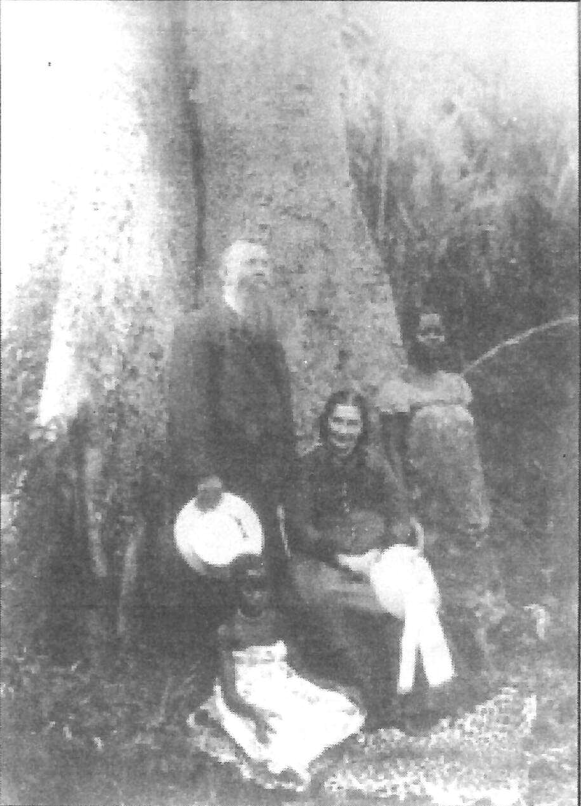
Fritz and Rosa Ramseyer in Abetifi

Upon their release, the Ramseyers went back to Switzerland to rest. The Ramseyers wished to return to Kumasi in 1874 as liberated missionaries but the political climate was not favourable to foreigners, especially former political prisoners. Besides, the Home Committee wanted them to wait due to the political situation Fritz Ramseyer decided to create a mission post right outside the Asante jurisdiction. The Ramseyers returned to the Gold Coast at the end of 1875 and initially settled at Kyebi in Akyem Abuakwa. With the approval of the Home Committee, he selected the mountainous Abetifi, situated on the Kwahu Ridge at an altitude of 600 metres above sea level. He had also considered setting up the mission base in Obo Kwahu, about three hours from Abetifi. There were also rumours that Kwahu desired to leave the Asante confederacy due to Ashanti's taxation policy of salt and gunpowder. Furthermore, Ramseyer did not want to another political imbroglio. The township was known for being hospitable to foreigners. The Ramseyers were temporarily settled at the Kubasehene Yaw Preko's house and fetish shrine under the auspices of the paramount chieftain of Abetifi, Nana Kofi Denkyi. Ramseyer had earlier stayed in this house as a captive on the march to Kumasi. Ramseyer, on his way to Kumasi as a captive, promised Nana Kofi Denkyi, a chief in Abetifi, that he would return to Abetifi if he is set free by his captors. This is due to the courtesies Nana Denkyi extended to him. True to his word, when he regained his freedom, Ramseyer returned to Abetifi, as an ordained minister. He brought Christianity to the people of Kwahu. Nana Kofi Denkyi and his people welcomed him to Abetifi and allocated him a forest in Abetifi called 'Oboyan' now called 'Christian Quarters'. He built a mission house there and the first chapel and started a congregation in 1877 with 20 people. This congregation is now referred to as the Abetifi Ramseyer Congregation. As a means of calling people to worship, he ordered a bell from Germany. On 5 May 1910, he built another chapel, which now houses the Abetifi Ramseyer Congregation Ramseyer started his school and fellowship in this same house, propagating the Gospel among the people. He sometimes held open-air vigils and religious revivals where many natives, including fetish priests, Agya Yaw Tawi and Otuo Kofi converted to Christianity. By 12 March 1877, the natives Ramseyer had baptised included Yaw Beeko and his wife, Buruwa, Otieku Kwadwo, Taetta and his wife, Ansaa, Jonathan Kofi Brebo and his wife, Akosua Angyie, Kwabena Gyane and his wife, Ansaa and Osei Yaw. They were first congregants at the church Ramseyer established at Abetifi.

Ramseyer asked the Abetifi traditional authorities for a parcel of land to build a mission station. This move was opposed by the local shamans who viewed Ramseyer as a threat to their livelihoods as many indigenes were abandoning the traditional religion in favour of the Christian faith. On 5 February 1876, Ramseyer bought a plot of land from the Kubeasehene, Yaw Preko at a cost of £110. Coordinating the logistics for a mission outpost was difficult as transportation access to the town was spotty in that period. As the nearest major locale to Kumasi, the Basel Mission Home Committee was eager to establish a mission station in Abetifi as a springboard for further evangelism in Asante. It therefore imported hundred professional builders and labourers from Akropong in 1876 to build a mission house and chapel. Perched atop a hill, the two-storied eighteen-room structure built with limestone and solid timber, was consecrated in 1878. The doors and windows were made of wood as were the shingles used for roofing. Rainstorm nearly damaged the building during construction, requiring reinforcement with wooden beams on the upper level using the architectural engineering, commonly found in Switzerland and Germany, distinct for English-style Tudor houses. The building is still in use by the Presbyterian Church of Ghana and it underwent refurbishment in 1998–99. Ramseyer also considered nearby towns, Bompata and Petrensa as alternative towns to establish temporary mission station before the entry to Kumasi.

Ramseyer trained the native converts to become catechists to assist him in his missionary work. He tasked two native converts, Samuel K. Boateng and James Boama to oversee the operations of these two outposts. Today, catechists of the church are put-in-charge of congregations with no substantive ministers. The system helped in the numerical growth of the Presbyterian church of the Gold Coast. In August 1876, Ramseyer started the Kwahu Tafo mission station and later in December 1876, the outpost at Bokuruwa was established.

Moreover, in the Kwahu area, Fritz Ramseyer met and worked with Peter Hall, the son of West Indian missionaries, John and Mary Hall, recruited by Danish minister, Andreas Riis and had arrived on the Gold Coast from Jamaica in 1843 under the auspices of the Basel Mission. Peter Hall was elected the first Moderator of the Presbyterian Church of the Gold Coast from 1918 to 1922. There was always the constant fear of an insurgency by the Asante since Kwahu had become a political possession of Asante. Besides, Ramseyer suffered ill-health leading to a periodic home leave in Europe.

On 1 October 1871, through an arrangement made by a personal friend of Ramseyer and a member of the Asante royal family, Bosommuru, Fritz Ramseyer held his first open-air service on Asante soil. About hundred people gathered to listen to his message.

Earlier in 1877, in his report to Basel, Ramseyer stated that he and colleagues had started three schools with a total population of 311 pupils. By 1890, they had established eight schools, six outposts that housed more than 200 Christian converts. In September 1881, Ramseyer went to Kumasi with the Basel missionary, Joseph Mohr. They received a warm reception from the Asantehene who treated him as an old long-lost friend and presented to the king a Twi language Bible that had been translated by Johann Gottlieb Christaller, the German philologist and Basel missionary. The Asantehene, nonetheless, declined the gift. Other sources state that he presented an English Bible to the king a decade earlier on 29 June 1871. The permanent station in Kumasi was yet to be set up by Ramseyer due to the political atmosphere of that time. In 1882, Ramseyer and David Asante tried again to go to Kumasi with the objective of setting up a mission station; their attempt however failed. During this period, there was stool disputes in Juaben and Bekwai within the Asante confederacy making mission work in Kumasi unsafe. On 28 January 1876, Basel missionaries, Fritz Ramseyer, Christian Eugene Wermer (mission dyer born on (8 April 1851), Jacob Weiner (mission carpenter born on 9 February 1850), Joseph Mohr and David Asante entered Abetifi en route to Kumasi.

A political situation in 1896 necessitated the return of Fritz Ramseyer to Kumasi. This was twenty-two years after he had been released from captivity. The Asante stool represented by the Asantehene, Otumfuo Agyemang Prempeh I, owed the British crown five thousand ounces of gold, as part of the treaty of Fomena, after it lost one of the Anglo-Asante wars. British soldiers were advancing towards Kumasi to intimidate the Asantehene. Among other demands, the British wanted the Asante Kingdom to become a British protectorate under the Gold Coast colony. Prempeh remembered Fritz Ramseyer and requested that his services as an arbiter in the impasse. However, the British troops had by then stormed Kumasi. The Asantehene, the Queen mother and royal courtiers were captured and taken into exile at the Elmina Castle and later to the Seychelles. In the aftermath, the colonial forces built a fortress in the Asante capital. The British Governor granted the Ramseyers permission to settle in Kumasi and build a mission station.

On 21 February 1896, in a letter to Basel, Ramseyer wrote, "It is no longer a dream. Today, my wife and my nephew [Edmond] Perregaux have [been permitted] to move to Kumasi. The town has become a Basel Mission station. The land is open for us to work!" In June 1896, Rosa and Fritz Ramseyer, together with their nephew, Edmond Perregaux and Joseph Adjaye, a local Christian convert completed their move to Kumasi. In July 1896, a mission station was subsequently constructed on a plot of land at Bantama acquired by Ramseyer with the blessing of the Asantehene and the chieftain, Bantamahene under whose jurisdiction Bantama was located. Notable among his converts was Kofi Karikari (1862–1953), a royal courtier in the Osodo division, the culinary department of the Asantehene's household kitchen who became one of the first congregants of the Ramseyer Memorial Presbyterian Church and the first Presbyter of Asante. After his conversion and subsequent baptism, he became Andreas Karikari and assisted Ramseyer in evangelistic travels as an itinerant preacher.

Ramseyer also carried out missionary work at Kwaso, a town near Ejisu in Ashanti. He established a Basel Mission church there which now bears his name. Some of his first converts at Kwaso include Kofi Dom, J. C. Oppong, Yaw Amofah, Kofi Mensah, Abena Buruwaa and Afia Ohu, the wife of Kwame Wora. By December 1896, Ramseyer had opened two outstations and schools in Kwaso and Bekwaman in 1896. The Kwaso Presbyterian Primary School started in 1898 as a successor to the institution Ramseyer founded in 1896. His wife, Rosa Ramseyer played a pivotal role in the girls’ education programme in Asante, teaching domestic science such as sewing, baking and household chores. At Kwaso, Ramseyer was hosted by Opanin Kwame Wura whose two associates, Agya Apea and Opanin Dwamena became his Ramseyer's interpreters and tutors in the Twi language.

Overall, by 1898, the Basel Mission had 128 schools with a student population of 500 and 157 churches with nearly 17000 congregants. By 1899, Kumasi had seen 33 baptisms and 160 Christian converts, mostly indigenes from outside the city, were living there. Seventeen mission stations had also been established in Asante with Kumasi being the focal point, with fifteen Basel mission schools in Asante in 1900. By 1914, the Kwahu station had 2582 congregants in 21 churches, Bompata had a Salem Christian village quarter and the Akim outpost had 3400 Christians in 32 villages with 900 pupils enrolled in 27 schools.

Drunkenness and polygamy which were at odds with Protestant piety made the mission work challenging to Ramseyer. Some converts reverted to worshipping their local deities such as Atia, Aberewa, Tigari and Hwe-me-so. Several Muslims settled in Kumasi after the Yaa Asantewaa war, giving rise to the "Zongo" community in the city. The missionaries feared the influx of Islam may hamper their Christian evangelism efforts. Many of the converts from Asante were reluctant to train as teachers after their basic education. The Basel Mission therefore had to recruit teachers from Akwapim, Akyem, Kwahu, Ga and Krobo for the schools Ramseyer and his colleagues built in Asante territories.

In March 1900, the political atmosphere worsened again when the British colonial administrators led by the British Governor, Sir Frederick Mitchell Hodgson, demanded the relinquishing of the "Golden Stool", the most sacred symbol of traditional authority of the Asante. Hodgson had succeeded Maxwell Scott as the British Governor in 1897. In the view of the Governor, the Golden Stool was now a property of the Crown as the kingdom was now a British Protectorate. The ensuing melee was the Yaa Asantewaa War in 1901 spearheaded by Yaa Asantewaa, the Queen of Ejisu. The Ramseyer family, together with other foreigners such as Mr. and Mrs. Jost and Mr. Weller, sought shelter at the new garrison built by the British in Kumasi. Three native teachers of the Basel mission died during the war: Maxwell Okanta and Helena Sakyiama, both whom died of starvation at the fort and Samuel Out who was beheaded at Takyimantia.

The uprising lasted for two months and food supplies began to run out. The refugees including the Ramseyers had to escape in the dead of the night to the coast. Rosa Ramseyer, who was by then partly paralysed due earlier complications during pregnancy and childbirth, was carried by porters, throughout the journey. Kumasi was razed to the ground, destroying the Basel and Wesleyan mission station as the colonial forces quelled the revolt. The soldiers stole several properties of the mission including furniture and kitchenware. According to scholars, domestic slaves who had been freed by the British administration in 1896 and were enrolled in Ramseyer's school were most likely re-taken into slavery by the Asante army after the Yaa Asantewaa War. One of the peace treaties signed after the war between the British and the Asante stipulated that "the Christian missions should be allowed freedom to preach and open schools." The colonial government maintained a strong military presence after the war had ended in order to maintain law and order.

After this episode, the Ramseyers went to Aburi for a short period before going to Switzerland for furlough. The missionaries returned to Kumasi on 13 December 1901 for a fourth time and rebuilt the mission house, school and parish church, now named Ramseyer Memorial Presbyterian Church, located on Mission Road in the suburb of Adum, formerly known as Dareboase. The chapel was christened "Ebenezer" a reference to the Biblical verse in 1 Samuel 7:12, "how far the Lord has helped us"- an allusion to the pain, suffering and tribulations the Ramseyers had endured in Asante. This time, they were assisted by other Basel missionaries, I. Bellon, Karl Epting, missionary-architect and African pastors, Nathanael V. Asare and Samuel Kwafo. In 1907, the Basel Mission House was built. It was dubbed "a second fort in Kumasi" by the Chief Commissioner of Asante.

Ramseyer carried out mission work in Ejisu, Atebubu, Nkoranza, Wankyi, Sekwa and Berekum. One of Ramseyer's colleagues, A. P. Bauer spent five years as a missionary in the Nsuta township from 1904 to 1909. Other Basel missionaries who worked in Asante include A Jehle, A. Lipps and F. Jost. Non-European missionaries and clergymen who aided and built upon Ramseyer's work include, H. J. Keteku, H. Dako, B. O. Ampofo, Nicholas Timothy Clerk, A. O. Mate, J. Dwamena, James Boama, C. E. Opoku, M. Ape, B. M. Seku A. Y. Yeboah, A. Anane, Amo Gottfried and Sam Prempeh.

In his final tour of duty, Fritz Ramseyer lived in Kumasi from 1906 until 1908, before permanently returning to his home country, Switzerland, after forty-four years residing on the Gold Coast. Ramseyer perceived his time in captivity as a preparatory period sanctioned by providence, for evangelism in Asante.

=== Artisan training and industry development ===
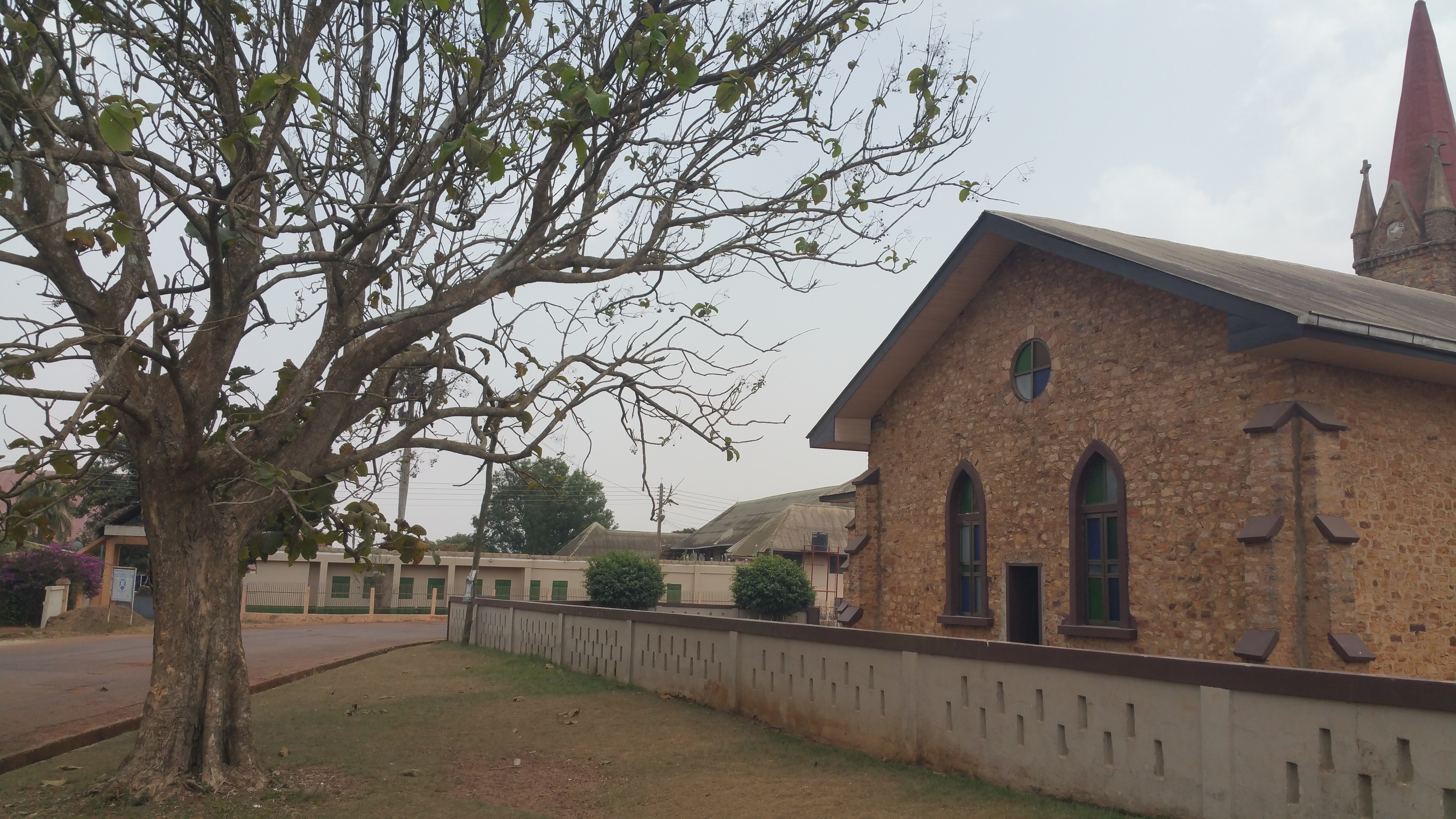
Ramseyer Presbyterian chapel in Abetifi

Ramseyer provided artisan training to the natives, especially in housing design and building technology that was commonplace in 19th century Switzerland. He trained Papa Mends in carpentry and the latter came to be known as "Carpenter Mends" due to his dexterity. He also trained a native of Antoa, Agya Oduro in carpentry. Many of his converts left their long-grass thatch roof, bamboo poles and beam huts and moved into the newly designed stone storey houses at the mission station in Adum. Ramseyer earned the nickname "Osiadan" (meaning the builder), which echoed a similar name given to Andreas Riis in Akropong in the 1840s. Ramseyer's handiwork also included the chapels and mission stations at Abetifi, Anum, Kumasi and Kwaso which all have similar architecture. The chapel at Abetifi was modified and is now used as a library by the Abetifi campus of the Presbyterian University College. The chapel at Kumasi is used by the Ramseyer Memorial Presbyterian Church. The building at Anum is used as an administration block by the Presbyterian Senior High School there while the one at Abetifi is the main administration block for the Ramseyer Training Centre. The building at Kumasi is used as Guest House by the Asante Presbytery of the Presbyterian Church of Ghana.

Ramseyer also acquired lands at Abetifi, Bompata and Kumasi for the church as a whole which are now used by the Presbyterian Church of Ghana. The land at Adum, Kumasi now houses various offices and official residential buildings of the church officials such as Presbytery chairmen, regional manager of Presbyterian schools, Presbyterian basic school, Ramseyer Memorial Presbyterian Church, ministers’ manses and a book depot called A-Riis Company Limited. Previously, this piece of land was used as a burial ground for outcasts, slaves and criminals and was not fit for human settlement. As the mission station expanded, the site attracted commercial ventures which aided the socio-economic development of the church.

=== Photography ===
Fritz Ramseyer was also an amateur photographer, taking photographs of the Gold Coast, as early as 1888. He used industrially prepared negative films. A few of the pictures may have been printed on the Gold Coast while a large number was sent to the Basel Mission in Switzerland for processing. These photographs have been used at numerous lectures and in various academic books, brochures and magazines for the purposes of illustration. Fritz Ramseyer was the author and publisher of the first photography book about the Gold Coast. The book was published in his hometown, Neuchâtel in 1895 and comprised "80 views of missionary life, the indigenous culture and local personalities".

== Personal life ==
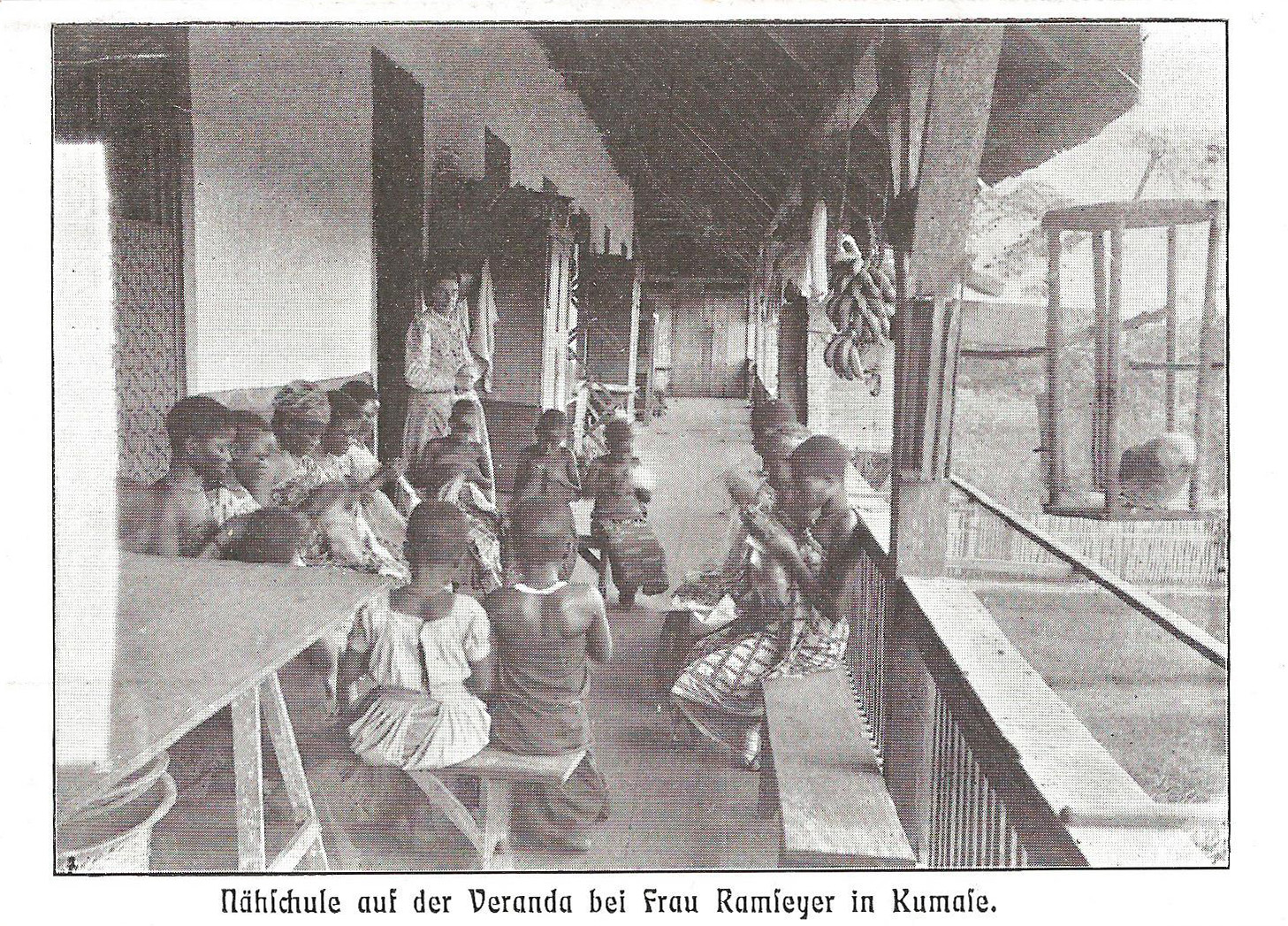
Mrs. Ramseyer giving sewing classes on her veranda in Kumasi

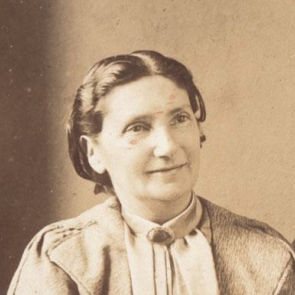
Rosa Ramseyer, née Bontemps

On 8 February 1866, Fritz Ramseyer married Rosa Louise Bontemps at Christiansborg, Gold Coast. She was born on 7 July 1841 to Henri Louis François Bontemps. Rosa Ramseyer, was a native of Valangin in the canton of Neuchâtel in Switzerland and had trained in both England and Basel to become a missionary. In the autumn of 1868, Rosa Ramseyer gave birth to Fritz Junior, affectionately called "Fritzchen". During their time in Kumasi, Rosa Ramseyer gave birth to twins, one of whom died. Overall, they had eight children but four died in childhood. As a result of her ordeal in captivity, Rosa Ramseyer became partially paralysed and her health condition deteriorated over time, permanently leaving the Gold Coast in 1904. Rosa Ramseyer eventually died in Switzerland in 1906. Fritz Ramseyer re-married in 1908 to a fifty-nine year old Swiss woman called Elisa Uranie Bornand, whose father was Justin Bornard. Ramseyer's nephew, Edmond Perregaux died in Kumasi in 1905.

== Published works ==
- Vier Jahren in Asante: Tagebücher der Missionaren Ramseyer und Kühne aus der Zeit Ihrer Gefangenschaft (Four years in Asante: Diaries of the missionaries Ramseyer and Kühne from the period of their imprisonment)
- Achtzig Ansichten von der Goldküste (Westafrika): Nach Originalaufnahmen des Missionars (Eighty views of the Gold Coast (West Africa): Based on the original photographs of the missionary)
- Dark and Stormy Days at Kumassi, 1900: Or, Missionary Experience in Ashanti, According to the Diary of Rev. Frits Ramseyer

== Death, memorials and legacy ==
Fritz Ramseyer died from a heart attack on 6 August 1914, aged 73, in Switzerland. There are a number of institutions in Ghana that have been named in the memory of Fritz and Rosa Ramseyer. These include the Ramseyer Memorial Presbyterian Church and the Ramseyer Vocational and Technical Centre, both in Kumasi as well as Ramseyer Presbyterian Training Centre and the Ramseyer Retreat Centre, both in Abetifi. The Ramseyer Memorial Swiss School in Accra was also named in his honour. A boarding house, Ramseyer House in Prempeh College was named in his honour. Other Presbyterian churches named after him include those at Bubiashie, North Kaneshie, Kwaso, Dansoman, Bompata, Wiaso, Kwahu-Tafo, Kwahu-Bokruwa, Nkwatia Kwahu, Abetifi-Kwahu, Hansua-Techiman and in Columbus, Ohio. Fritz Ramseyer also had a complex legacy: In his mission work, he was perceived by his colleagues as having autocratic tendencies with a domineering personality. This made him too harsh and difficult to work with as he became very impatient when things did not go his way. His evangelistic zeal, belief in the inerrancy and centrality of Scripture as well as his strong sense of Christian fellowship shaped by his Pietist upbringing helped spread the Protestant faith in Asante and the "transformation of indigenous lives and social institutions." A commemorative marble plate at the Ramseyer Memorial Presbyterian Church was erected in honour of Rosa Ramseyer. Marie-Joseph Bonnat, the French adventurer and a co-captive of the Ramseyers noted in his diary, "Mr. R. was the most sincere man I have ever met, a fine example of humanity! Mrs. R. was just like her husband a very good person, even if she appeared at times nervous. The poor lady may well be excused for this, when one takes into account how much she had been put to test. She was an energetic woman, who endured her trials with courage and fortitude."

== Literature ==
- Claude-Hélène Perrot, Albert Van Dantzig (1994) Marie-Joseph Bonnat et les Ashanti – Journal (1869–1874) Mémoires de la Société des Africanistes.
