= Abraham Nana Opare Kwakye =

Ghanaian Presbyterian minister and theologian

Abraham Nana Opare-Kwakye
- 19th Moderator of the General Assembly
- Church: Presbyterian Church of Ghana
- Elected: 17 August 2023
- Installed: 1 December 2023
- Predecessor: Rt. Rev. Prof. Joseph Obiri Yeboah Mante

Personal details
- Denomination: Presbyterian
- Spouse: Benedicta Kwakye
- Children: 3
- Occupation: Minister, theologian, academic
- Education: University of Ghana

Abraham Nana Opare-Kwakye is a Ghanaian Presbyterian minister, theologian, academic and church leader. He is the 19th Moderator of the General Assembly of the Presbyterian Church of Ghana (PCG), having been elected in August 2023 and assuming office on 1 December 2023. Prior to his election, he served as Chairperson of the Ga Presbytery of the Presbyterian Church of Ghana and was a Senior Lecturer in the Department for the Study of Religions at the University of Ghana. His academic work focuses on African Christianity, Church History and Christian Missions.

== Early life and education ==
Abraham Nana Opare-Kwakye was born and raised in Tema, Ghana. He received his early education at Deks Preparatory School before attending Tema Secondary School. He later enrolled at the Presbyterian Training College, Akropong-Akuapem (now Presbyterian College of Education), where he obtained a Teachers' Certificate 'A' through the University of Cape Coast.

He subsequently pursued higher education at the University of Ghana, where he obtained a Diploma in the Study of Religions, a Bachelor of Arts degree and a Doctor of Philosophy (PhD) in the Study of Religions. He also earned a Certificate in Ministry from Trinity Theological Seminary, Legon.

Between 2013 and 2014, Opare-Kwakye held a Swiss Government Excellence Scholarship (ESKAS) postdoctoral fellowship at the Faculty of Theology of the University of Basel, Switzerland. During the same period, he participated in the Global Ecumenical Theological Institute organised by the World Council of Churches in Busan, South Korea.

== Ministry ==
Following theological training at Trinity Theological Seminary, Legon, Opare-Kwakye was commissioned into the Holy Ministry of Word and Sacrament of the Presbyterian Church of Ghana in 1997 and ordained in 1999.

He served as a probationary minister at the La Bethel Congregation between 1997 and 1999 before becoming Minister-in-Charge of Christ Congregation, Adentan, from 1999 to 2002. He subsequently served as Minister-in-Charge of Calvary Congregation, Haatso (2002–2007), District Minister for Madina District (2007–2011), District Minister for Osu District (2011–2013), and Minister-in-Charge of El Shaddai Congregation, Tesa-Adjiringanor (2014–2020). Between 2020 and 2023, he served as Chairperson of the Ga Presbytery of the Presbyterian Church of Ghana.

Within the Presbyterian Church of Ghana, Opare-Kwakye has held several national leadership positions, including Youth Coordinator of the Ga Presbytery, Assistant National Secretary of the National Ministers' Conference, National Chaplain of the National Union of Presbyterian Students (NUPS-G), Recorder of the General Assembly, Chairperson of the PCGTV Technical Committee, and membership of several church boards and committees.

== Academic career ==
Alongside his pastoral ministry, Opare-Kwakye has pursued an academic career in religious studies. In January 2014, he joined the Department for the Study of Religions at the University of Ghana as a lecturer and was promoted to Senior Lecturer in February 2020.

His teaching areas include Christianity in Africa, Early Church History, Church History, Christian Missions, West African Church History, and Pentecostalism in Ghana. His research interests focus on African Christianity, Church History, Christian Missions, and World Christianity.

Opare-Kwakye has also served as a part-time lecturer at Trinity Theological Seminary, Legon, and the Akrofi-Christaller Institute of Theology, Mission and Culture. His scholarly work has appeared in peer-reviewed journals and edited academic volumes on African Christianity, Christian missions, and church history.

== Moderator of the Presbyterian Church of Ghana ==
At the 23rd General Assembly of the Presbyterian Church of Ghana, held at Abetifi in the Eastern Region in August 2023, Opare-Kwakye was elected the 19th Moderator of the General Assembly, succeeding Rt. Rev. Prof. Joseph Obiri Yeboah Mante. He officially assumed office on 1 December 2023.

As Moderator, he serves as the spiritual head of the Presbyterian Church of Ghana and presides over the meetings of the General Assembly. He also represents the church in national and international ecumenical engagements and provides oversight for the denomination's governance, mission and ministry.

During his tenure, Opare-Kwakye has advocated ethical leadership, national development, educational discipline, graduate education, youth empowerment and church growth. He has continued the church's strategic focus on evangelism, discipleship and social intervention through education and healthcare ministries.

He also serves as Chancellor of the Presbyterian University, Ghana, and Chairperson of the Governing Council of Trinity Theological Seminary, Legon.

== Research and publications ==
Opare-Kwakye's academic research focuses on African Christianity, Church History, Christian Missions and World Christianity. His scholarly work examines the development of Christianity in Ghana and Africa, the interaction between Christianity and indigenous cultures, and the historical evolution of Christian missions.

He has authored and co-authored several peer-reviewed journal articles and book chapters. His publications include studies on nineteenth-century Christian missions in the Gold Coast, African Christian spirituality, and the history of Presbyterianism in Ghana.

=== Selected publications ===
- Opare-Kwakye, A. N. (2015). Encountering "Prosperity" Gospel in Nineteenth-Century Gold Coast. In Trajectories of Religion in Africa.
- Opare-Kwakye, A. N. (2018). "Returning African Christians in Mission to the Gold Coast." Studies in World Christianity.
- Opare-Kwakye, A. N. (2021). "Language, Literature, Prayer and Music Repertoires as Sources of African Christian Spirituality and Values." International Bulletin of Mission Research.

== Personal life ==
Opare-Kwakye is married to Benedicta Kwakye, a nursing professional. They have three daughters.

== See also ==
- Presbyterian Church of Ghana
- Presbyterian University, Ghana
- University of Ghana
- Christian Council of Ghana
