= Christian Council of Ghana =

Religious organisation based in Ghana

- Formation: 30 October 1929; 96 years ago
- Type: Ecumenical body
- General Secretary: Cyril Fayose
- Website: www.christiancouncilgh.org

The Christian Council of Ghana (CCG) is an umbrella group that unites 31 churches and denominations in Ghana. The council has its members from Church of Power World Ministry, Charismatic, Pentecostal, Orthodox, Inside God Christian college, and other churches.

== History of the Council ==
The CCG was formed on 30 October 1929. Five churches, namely:

- African Methodist Episcopal (AME),
- Zion Church, English Church Mission (Anglican),
- Evangelical Presbyterian Church, Ghana (then the Ewe Presbyterian Church),
- Presbyterian Church of the Gold Coast (now Presbyterian Church of Ghana), and
- the Methodist Church Ghana (then the Wesleyan Methodist Church)

united aiming to work with various congregations on social matters and to speak for the voiceless in society.

== Membership of the council ==
The council has been restructured several times since its formation. It currently includes 29 churches and two Christian organizations.

Current Membership

1. The Methodist Church Ghana
2. Presbyterian Church of Ghana
3. Evangelical Presbyterian Church, Ghana
4. The Salvation Army
5. African Methodist Episcopal Zion Church
6. Christian Methodist Episcopal Church
7. African Methodist Episcopal Church
8. EDEN Revival Church
9. Ghana Baptist Convention
10. Evangelical Lutheran Church
11. Religious Society of Friends
12. Ghana Mennonite Church
13. Greek Orthodox Church
14. Christ Evangelical Mission
15. Evangelical Church of Ghana
16. Fellowship of Christian Churches
17. Restoration Christian Church
18. Young Men’s Christian Association
19. Young Women’s Christian Association
20. Legon Interdenominational Church
21. Anglican Diocese of Accra
22. The Luke Society Mission Inc.
23. Ghana Evangelical Convention
24. Accra Ridge Church
25. Tema Joint Church
26. Teshie/Nungua United Church
27. Atomic Hills United Church
28. Ghana Police Church
29. Nigritian Episcopal Church
30. Grace Communion International
31. Church of power World Ministry
32. Inside God Christian college

=== Ecumenical affiliations ===
1. World Council of Churches
2. All Africa Conference of Churches
3. Fellowship of Christian Council in West Africa
4. Programme for Christian/Muslim Relations in Africa (PROCMURA)

=== Chairpersons of the Christian Council of Ghana ===
Chairpersons of the Christian Council of Ghana
From	To	Name	Organisation
1929	1934	Rt. Rev. J. O. Anglionby	Anglican Diocese of Accra
1935	1937	Rev. C. W. Armstrong	
1938	1939	Rev. H. H. G. MacMillan	Accra Ridge Church
1940	1943	Rev. M. B. Taylor	Methodist Church Ghana
1944	1945	Rev. J. Bardsley	
1946	1949	Rev. M. B. Taylor	Methodist Church Ghana
1950	1950	Rev. C. G. Baëta	Evangelical Presbyterian Church, Ghana
1951	1951	Rev. Canon C. H. Elliot	
1952	1953	Rt. Rev. J. C. Daly	Bishop of Accra
1953	1956	Rev. S. G. Williamson	
1956	1957	Rev. C. G. Baëta	Evangelical Presbyterian Church, Ghana
1957	1960	Rev. G. T. Eddy	
1960	1963	Rev. C. G. Baëta	Evangelical Presbyterian Church, Ghana
1963	1965	Rev. F. C. F. Grant	
1965	1967	Rev. E. M. L. Odjidja	Presbyterian Church of Ghana
1967	1968	Justice Nii Amaa Ollennu	
1968	1969	Rev. T. W. Koomson	
1969	1970	Col. S. J. Hill	
1970	1971	Rt. Rev. I. S. M. LeMaire	
1971	1972	Rev. A. K. Abutiate	Evangelical Presbyterian Church, Ghana
1972	1975	Rt. Rev. G. K. Sintim-Misa	
1975	1976	Rt. Rev. C. K. Yamoah	
1976	1978	Rt. Rev. C. K. Dovlo	Evangelical Presbyterian Church, Ghana
1979	1979	C. Awotwi - Pratt	
1980	1980	Rt. Rev. Dr. I. S. M. LeMaire	
1981	1981	Rt. Rev. I. H. Frempong	
1982	1983	Rt. Rev. Prof. N. K. Dzobo	Evangelical Presbyterian Church, Ghana
1984	1984	Rt. Rev. S. B. Essamuah	
1985	1985	Rt. Rev. F. W. B. Thompson	
1986	1986	Rt. Rev. I. H. Frempong	
1987	1987	Rt. Rev. Prof. N. K. Dzobo	Evangelical Presbyterian Church, Ghana
1988	1988	Rt. Rev. J. S. A. Stephens	
1989	1989	Rt. Rev. Lt. Col. F. W. B. Thompson	Anglican Diocese of Accra
1990	1990	Rt. Rev. D. A. Koranteng	Presbyterian Church of Ghana
1991	1993	Rt. Rev. Prof. K. A. Dickson	Methodist Church Ghana
1994	1995	Rt. Rev. Lt. Col. F. W. B. Thompson	Anglican Diocese of Accra
1996	1998	Col. John E. Amoah	
1998	2001	Rt. Rev. Justice Offei Yaw Akrofi	Anglican Diocese of Accra
2001	2003	Rt. Rev. Dr. Sam Prempeh	Presbyterian Church of Ghana
2003	2006	Rt. Rev. Dr. Paul Kofi Fynn	Evangelical Lutheran Church of Ghana
2006	21 April 2010	Rt. Rev. Dr. Yaw Frempong-Manso	Presbyterian Church of Ghana
21 April 2010	2013	Most Rev. Prof. Emmanuel Asante	Methodist Church Ghana
25 April 2013	2016	Rt. Rev. Francis Amenu	Evangelical Presbyterian Church, Ghana
2016	2019		
2019	21 April 2021	Most Rev. Dr. Paul Kwabena Boafo	Methodist Church Ghana
21 April 2021	19 April 2023	Rt. Rev. Prof. J. O. Y. Mante	Presbyterian Church of Ghana
19 April 2023	Incumbent	Rt. Rev. Dr. Hilliard Dela Dogbe	African Methodist Episcopal Zion Church

== Projects ==
The council undertakes various projects in Ghana. One of its major goals is the elimination of stigma and discrimination of people living with HIV/AIDS. The project trained community members in areas of the country that had high HIV/AIDS prevalence of 8–9%. The training involved basic facts about HIV/AIDS, stigma and discrimination among others.

The council has also set up an Interfaith Unit to educate Christians on the need for peaceful existence and tolerance among members of different faiths. The School Dropout Scholarship Programme promotes education among Liberian refugees in the Buduburam refugee settlement near Accra. The programme also identifies the causes and consequences of school dropout among the refugees.

In governance and nation building, the council monitors the activities of political parties and professional bodies in the country and offers advice to them. In 2005 the council appealed to Ghanaians and professional bodies to put the country's economy nation first and spend more time discussing issues of national interest concerning education, health and poverty. In 2011 the council encouraged political party leaders and their followers to avoid the use of provocative language in their speeches.
