= Samuel Ayete-Nyampong =

Ghanaian Presbyterian minister

The Rev. Dr. Samuel Ayete-Nyampong
- Education: Trinity Theological Seminary, Legon (Dipl.-Theol.); University of Ghana (B.A.); University of Aberdeen (M.A., Ph.D.)
- Occupation: Presbyterian minister
- Spouse: Lilian Ayete-Nyampong
- Children: 3, Daisy, Angelina, John

Ecclesiastical career
- Church: Presbyterian Church of Ghana
- Offices held: Clerk of the General Assembly, Presbyterian Church of Ghana (2012 – 2019)

Samuel Ayete-Nyampong is a Ghanaian theologian and Presbyterian minister who was elected the Clerk of the General Assembly of the Presbyterian Church of Ghana (PCG) making him the chief ecclesial officer of the church. The role is equivalent to the rank of executive secretary or secretary-general of the national church, serving from 2012 to 2019. He is also the Vice President of the World Communion Communion of Reformed Churches (WCRC) based in Hanover, Germany, and the Theological Consultant to the Evangelical Mission in Solidarity (EMS) based in Stuttgart, Germany. He is a Lecturer in Pastoral Care and Counselling (Pastoral Gerontology) at the Trinity Theological Seminary, Accra-Ghana.

== Early life and education ==
Between 1984 and 1986, Samuel Ayete-Nyampong studied at the Trinity Theological Seminary, Legon where he obtained a diploma in theology at the University of Ghana, Legon. From 1986 to 1989, he studied for his bachelor's degree in psychology and theology. In 1992, he went on to the University of Aberdeen in Scotland, on a British Government Overseas Development Administration Shared Scholarship (ODASS) and earned an MA in Pastoral Care and Counselling in 1994. He completed his doctorate in Pastoral Gerontology in 1997, at the same institution.

== Ministry ==
He was the associate resident minister at the Ramseyer Memorial Presbyterian Church, Adum, Kumasi from 1989 to 1991. Between 1991 and 1992, he was a psychology instructor at the Ramseyer Training Centre, Abetifi. He served at the resident minister at the Accra Ridge Church and a chaplain of the Ridge Church School from 1997 to 2002. He was then transferred to the Christ Presbyterian Church, Adentan, Accra as the pastor-in-charge from 2002 to 2004.

He became the Director of Ecumenical and Social Relations of Presbyterian Church of Ghana, from 2004 to 2010. In this role, he was instrumental in forging strategic alliances with sister churches and institutions like the Christian Council of Ghana, World Council of Churches (WCC), the World Communion of Reformed Churches (WCRC), the All Africa Conference of Churches (AACC), the African Partnership Consultation (APC), Africa Continental Assembly (ACA), the Association of Churches and Missions in Southwestern Germany (EMS) and in nations like Ghana, Malawi, Sierra Leone, Liberia, Nigeria, Cameroon, South Korea, Germany, Switzerland, Austria, Belgium, Netherlands, Scotland, England, Canada, USA, Brazil, Australia, Jamaica.

From 2010 to 2011, Ayete-Nyampong headed the Presbyterian Interfaith Research and Resource Centre where he started the International Interfaith Women's’ Network for Peace and Development (IIWNPD) and the Ghana Interfaith Network for Peace (GIYNEP). Ayete-Nyampong has attended conferences in the US, UK, Australia, Canada, Germany, Italy, Spain, Switzerland, Austria, Netherlands, Belgium, France, Cameroon, Tanzania, Botswana, South Africa, Nigeria, Kenya, Mozambique, Zimbabwe, Indonesia, Korea, Lebanon, Brazil, Jamaica, DR Congo, South Sudan, Rwanda, India and Malaysia.

In 2011, he was inducted as the Chairperson for the Akuapem Presbytery of the Presbyterian Church of Ghana.

== Personal life ==
Together with his Dr. Lilian Ayete-Nyampong, they raised three children: Daisy, Angelina and John.

== Selected works ==
- Manual on Conflict Resolution and Management (2006)
- Ecumenical and Social Relations of the Presbyterian Church of Ghana- A Resource for Church Leaders (2007)
- Pastoral Care of Elderly People in Africa- A Contextual and Cross-Cultural Study (2008)
- Ageing in Contemporary Ghana (2008)
- Editor and Publisher of The Messenger Magazine (The Magazine for the African Churches in partnership with Mission 21, Basel, Switzerland) (2008, 2009, 2010, 2011, 2012)
- Ageing Gracefully: A Practical Guide to Healthy and Successful Ageing
- A Study of Pastoral Care of the Elderly in Africa: An Interdisciplinary Approach with Focus on Ghana, Author House (2014)
