= Hilliard Dogbe =

Ghanaian theologian and Bishop of the African Methodist Episcopal Zion Church

Hillard Kwashie Dela Dogbe

Chairman of the Christian Council of Ghana
- Incumbent
- Assumed office 19 April 2023
- Preceded by: Joseph Obiri Yeboah Mante

Presiding Bishop of the African Methodist Episcopal Zion Church (Western West Africa Episcopal District)
- Incumbent
- Assumed office 2 October 2016
- Preceded by: Seth O. Lartey

Personal details
- Born: Hillard Kwashie Dela Dogbe; 5 April 1970 (age 56) Accra, Greater Accra Region, Ghana
- Spouse: Cynthia Serwaa Dogbe
- Children: 2
- Education: Accra Academy
- Alma mater: University of Ghana (B.A.); Trinity Theological Seminary, Legon (MTh); Princeton Theological Seminary, Princeton (MA); Luther SeminaryPhD)
- Occupation: Theologian; Presiding Bishop of the African Methodist Episcopal Zion Church (Western West Africa Episcopal District)

Hilliard Kwashie Dela Dogbe (born 5 April 1970) is a Ghanaian clergyman and bishop in the African Methodist Episcopal Zion Church (A.M.E. Zion Church). He currently serves as the Bishop of the Western West Africa Episcopal District, which encompasses Liberia, Côte d'Ivoire, Ghana and Togo.

== Early life and education ==
Dogbe was born in Accra, Ghana, to Presiding Elder Emile Doe Dogbe-Gakpetor and Mrs. Catherine Efua Dogbe-Gakpetor on 5 April 1970. He was baptized by Bishop W. A. Hilliard and received into full membership by Bishops Cecil Bishop and Ruben Lee Speaks in the A.M.E. Zion Church.

Dogbe attended Accra Academy for his secondary education and the University of Ghana, where he completed his undergraduate studies. He furthered his education at various institutions, earning a Master of Arts degree in Practical Theology (Christian Education) from Princeton Theological Seminary in Princeton, New Jersey, and a Master of Theology in Pastoral Care and Counseling from Trinity Theological Seminary, Legon in Accra, Ghana. He went on to obtain a Doctor of Philosophy (PhD) degree in Practical Theology with distinction from Luther Seminary in St. Paul, Minnesota, US. His dissertation was entitled; The Living Well: An Ecclesial Response to Alcoholism in Ghana.

== Career ==
=== Ministry and leadership ===
Throughout his career, Dogbe has held various leadership positions within the A.M.E. Zion Church, including serving as the Pastor in Charge of Aggrey Memorial A.M.E. Zion Church in Mamprobi. Additionally, he served as the Chief of Staff and Protocol to Bishop Seth Lartey.

Dogbe's has also served as the Acting Presiding Elder of the Accra Central District and as a pastor in charge of various A.M.E. Zion Church societies, such as Aggrey Memorial Society in Mamprobi, Bishop Speaks Society in Accra New Town, Ebenezer Society in New Sempe, and Little Rock Society in New Achimota. He has also served in important administrative roles, including Chairman of the District Finance Board in the Accra Central District and Chairman of the Accra New Town Local Council of Churches under the Christian Council of Ghana. In 2016, Dogbe was elected Presiding Bishop of the African Methodist Episcopal Zion Church for the Western West Africa Episcopal District. He became the 104th presiding bishop of the church since its inception in 1821 and the first Ghanaian to be elected to serve in that capacity.

=== Academic pursuits ===
Dogbe engages in academia, focusing on the development of ministers and leadership enhancement programs. He has served as an adjunct lecturer in pastoral care and counseling at Trinity Theological Seminary, Legon, Ghana. He also held the position of adjunct instructor in congregation and community care leadership at Luther Seminary in St. Paul, Minnesota. Dogbe was also a teaching assistant at Trinity Theological Seminary, Legon and the A.M.E. Zion Institute of Theology and Conference Studies in Ghana.

=== Boards and affiliations ===
Dogbe is a member of the Society for Pastoral Theology, an international professional organization for pastoral theologians based in Decatur, Georgia. He currently serves as the Chairperson of the Governing Council at Trinity Theological Seminary, Legon, Ghana. He is also a member of the Governing Council of Livingstone College in North Carolina, US, and serves on the advisory board of the Bible Society of Ghana. Furthermore, he holds a position on the executive committee of the Christian Council of Ghana.

=== Christian Council appointment ===
During the Annual General Meeting of the Christian Council of Ghana held on 19 April 2023, Dogbe was elected as the new Chairman of the council. He succeeded Joseph Obiri Yeboah Mante, who had served as chairman for two years.

== Publications and presentations ==
Dogbe has written two books. The first, titled Alcoholism in the African Family: A Christian Perspective, was published by Woeli Publishing Services in Ghana. His second book, The Church and Alcoholism in Ghana: A Practical Theological Interpretation, was published by Print Logistics in Ghana. He has also made several notable presentations, including those on topics such as Congregational Response to Alcoholism, The Trinity and Ecclesial Identity, The Place of the Family in Contemporary Christian Education and Overcoming Challenges of Ministry in the New Millennium.

== Personal life ==
Dogbe is married to Cynthia Serwaa Dogbe, and together they have two sons.
