= Presbyterian Church of Ghana =

Protestant denomination

The Presbyterian Church of Ghana
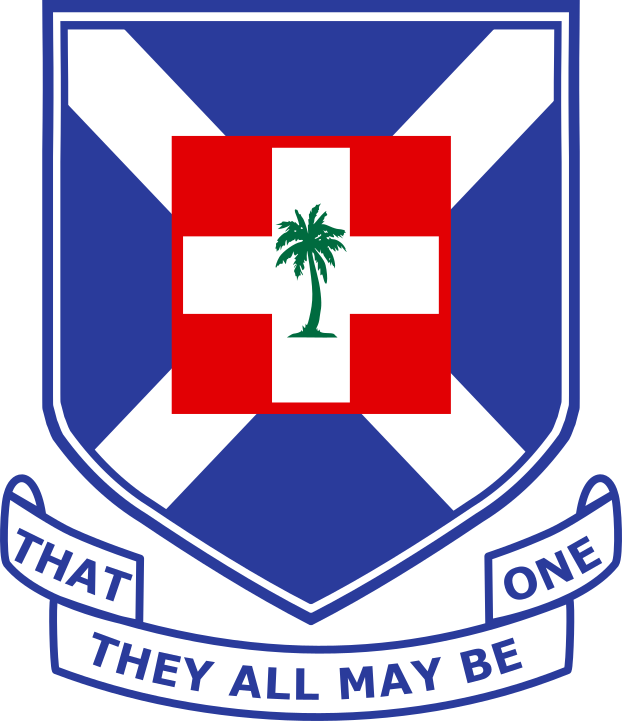
- Presbyterian Church of Ghana Logo
- Classification: Protestant
- Orientation: Presbyterian
- Scripture: Protestant Bible
- Theology: Reformed
- Polity: Presbyterian
- Associations: Christian Council of Ghana; All Africa Conference of Churches; World Communion of Reformed Churches; World Council of Churches
- Founder: Basel Mission; Moravian Church in Jamaica and the Cayman Islands; Church of Scotland
- Origin: 28 December 1828; 197 years ago; Accra, Gold Coast
- Congregations: 4,889 (2019)
- Members: 1,469,767 (2024) (Note: The Presbyterian Church of Ghana announced in 2024 that it had 1,366,375 members in 2023. In 2025, it published that it had a net increase of 103,392 new members in 2024. Therefore, the number of members of the denomination in 2024 is 1,469,767 people.)
- Publications: Christian Messenger
- Official website: pcgonline.org

The Presbyterian Church of Ghana is a Protestant denomination in Ghana. The denomination is considered mainstream Reformed Protestant, missions-focused and ecumenically-minded in theology, practices and traditions.The oldest, continuously existing, established Christian Church in Ghana, it was started by the Basel missionaries on 18 December 1828. The missionaries had been trained in Germany and Switzerland and arrived on the Gold Coast to spread Christianity. The work of the mission became stronger when Moravian missionaries from the West Indies arrived in the country in 1843. In 1848, the Basel Mission Church set up a seminary, now named the Presbyterian College of Education, Akropong, for the training of church workers to help in the missionary work. The Ga and Twi languages were added as part of the doctrinal text used in the training of the seminarians. In the 19th and early 20th centuries, the Presbyterian church had its missions concentrated in the southeastern parts of the Gold Coast and the peri-urban Akan hinterland. By the mid-20th century, the church had expanded and founded churches among the Asante people who lived in the middle belt of Ghana as well as the northern territories by the 1940s. The Basel missionaries left the Gold Coast during the First World War in 1917. The work of the Presbyterian church was continued by missionaries from the Church of Scotland, the mother church of the worldwide orthodox or mainline (oldline) Presbyterian denomination. The official newspaper of the church is the Christian Messenger, established by the Basel Mission in 1883. The denomination's Presbyterian sister church is the Evangelical Presbyterian Church, Ghana.

== Church structure ==
The church is a founding member of the Christian Council of Ghana. The association is an umbrella group that unites several churches in Ghana and monitors the activities of members to ensure that they are united in their Christian mission. Ordained ministers wear the Geneva gown and a clerical collar. Historically considered a "high church" denomination, the institution’s form of worship is marked by formality – liturgical readings, recitation of the Apostles' Creed, traditional hymn singing, church announcements and periodic administering of the Holy Communion. The denomination also administers infant baptism and the rite of confirmation. Yearly religious observances, such as Advent and Lent are noted in the church’s almanac. In contemporary times, however, a 'praise and worship' segment, more commonly associated with evangelicalism, Pentecostalism and the charismatic movement, is sometimes incorporated into church services to meet the preferences of younger congregants. The Presbyterian Hymn Book is used during services and is available in primarily English, Ga, Twi, Ewe and other Ghanaian languages and dialects.

The Presbyterian Church of Ghana has seven church departments that have specific tasks of building up the church in their respective activities. These are:

1. Department of Administration & Human Resource
2. Department of Church Life & Nurture
3. Department of Mission & Evangelism
4. Department of Ecumenical & Social Relations
5. Department of Development & Social Services
6. Department of Education
7. Department of Finance

== Membership ==
By 2015, the church had 876,257 members and 2573 congregations. By the end of 2019, the PCG had about a total membership of 1,015,174. According to the 2019 report of the Committee on Information Management, Statistics & Planning (IMSP) of the Department of Administration & Human Resource Management (AHRM) of the church, it had 4889 congregations. As of 2021, there were more than 1.7 million Presbyterians in Ghana, representing approximately 8% of Ghanaian Christians and comprising members of the Presbyterian Church of Ghana, Evangelical Presbyterian Church, Ghana, Global Evangelical Church and other smaller Reformed denominations in the Presbyterian tradition.

PCG Statistics – 2001 to 2022

Year	Total	Increase	%Increase
2001	500,190		
2002	535,130	34,940	7.0
2003	565,637	30,507	5.7
2004	578,727	13,090	2.3
2005	612,337	33,610	5.8
2006	615,391	3,054	0.5
2007	622,609	7,218	1.2
2008	624,890	2,281	0.4
2009	652,083	27,193	4.4
2010	691,949	39,866	6.1
2011	721,599	29,650	4.3
2012	739,548	17,949	2.5
2013	773,504	33,956	4.6
2014	811,807	38,303	5.4
2015	846,222	34,415	4.2
2016	876,010	29,788	3.5
2017	910,732	34,722	4.0
2018	947,015	36,283	4.0
2019	1,015,174	68,159	7.2
2020	1,063,649	48,475	4.8
2021	1,149,796	86,147	8.1
2022	1,261,413	111,617	9.7
2023	1,366,375	104,962	8.32
2024	1,469,767	103,392	7.57

== The Church and education ==
Education is an integral part of the church's responsibility to the communities it operates in. In general, Ghanaian Presbyterians have a high educational attainment. Together with Ghanaian Anglicans, Methodists and Roman Catholics - Christian denominations that also prioritize higher education, Presbyterians in Ghana were historically disproportionately represented in the upper ranks of government, industry, academia and the professional occupations. The church is the proprietor of more than 2400 basic schools including 487 kindergarten and nursery schools, 984 primary schools and 399 junior high schools. The church has 30 senior high schools, 40 private schools, 6 vocational institutions, 5 teacher training colleges, 2 research centres, 4 nursing training colleges and 5 training centres for pastors and laity. In 2003, the church started a university known as the Presbyterian University College. It is located at Abetifi-Kwahu in the Eastern region of Ghana.

In 2024, it was announced that the denomination had reached 1,366,375 members in 2023.

In 2025, the General Assembly Report stated that the denomination had grown to 1,469,767 members in 2024, following a net increase of 103,392 new members that year.

== The Church and health ==
The original health mission of the church started at the Basel Mission. Rudolf Fisch opened the first hospital at the Basel Mission in 1885. The church is a member of the Christian Health Association of Ghana (CHAG). CHAG is an umbrella group that unites all the health facilities in Ghana that are owned and run by Christian churches in Ghana. The church is the third largest provider of healthcare in Ghana, in terms of number of health facilities across the country in cities and towns such as Agogo, Bawku, Dormaa-Ahenkro, Donkorkrom, Bolgatanga, Salaga, Tease, Konongo, Duayaw-Nkwanta, Garu, Sandema, etc. Among its 55 health institutions, the church operates four major hospitals, 11 primary health care programmes, eight health centres, 13 clinics, 4 nurses' training colleges and a technical unit. These institutions provide a substantial portion of health services in the rural areas with a workforce of 1,977 and total hospital beds of 745. Curative, preventive and promotive services are provided to clients by the facilities in their respective catchment areas. The PHC interventions cover areas such as antenatal care, postnatal care, family planning, nutrition, growth monitoring of children between 0–5 years, immunization, health education, environmental sanitation, HIV&AIDS control, prevention, home-based care and counselling and clinical care at the health centres. The Church is currently the third largest single provider of health services in the country. The hospitals provide medical specialist services with resident specialists as follows:

- Agogo Hospital – Ophthalmology, internal medicine, general surgery, obstetrics / gynaecology and paediatrics
- Bawku Hospital – Ophthalmology, general surgery, orthopaedic surgery and obstetrics / gynaecology
- Dormaa Hospital – Paediatrics.

== The Church and agriculture ==
The Presbyterian Church of Ghana was established in 1828 and formalised partnership (Reg No. ACB 146/88) with the then government of Gold Coast now the Republic of Ghana in 1932 to contribute to the Spiritual and socio-economic development of the citizenry of Ghana. To this end, the Church established six (6) Agricultural Service stations in the late sixties in the Northern, Upper East, Eastern and Greater Accra regions of Ghana to complement the efforts of Government at poverty eradication in rural communities of the country.

== Assets ==
The church owns two printing and publishing houses including Waterville Publishing House, three newspapers, including Christian Messenger and eight bookshops. It has three retreat centres and operates four guest houses and three conference halls.

== Church leadership ==
=== Moderator of the General Assembly ===
The Moderator of the General Assembly position is the chairperson of the general assembly (previously synod), equivalent to the chief executive officer or managing director or president of the governing body of the national church organisation. Serving moderators use the honorific style, The Right Reverend. Retired moderators use the style, The Very Reverend after leaving office.

No	Moderator	Tenure of Office
1	Peter Hall	1918–22
2	Nathaniel Asare	1923–24
3	W. A. Quartey	1925–29
4	L. L. Richter	1930–31
5	E. C. Martinson	1932–38
6	S. S. Odonkor	1939–50
7	E. V. Asihene	1951–54
8	E. Max Dodu	1955–58
9	E. M. L. Odjidja	1959–66
10	J. K. Sintim-Misa	1967–78
11	I. H. Frempong	1979–86
12	D. A. Koranteng	1987–95
13	A. A. Beeko	1995–98
14	Sam Prempeh	1999–03
15	Yaw Frimpong-Manso	2004–10
16	Emmanuel Martey	2010–16
17	Cephas Narh Omenyo	2016–18
18	J. O. Y. Mante	2018–23
19	Abraham Nana Opare Kwakye	2023–

=== Synod Clerk / Clerk of the General Assembly ===
The Clerk of the General Assembly position (previously Synod Clerk) is the chief ecclesial (ecclesiastical) officer of the general assembly, equivalent to as the chief administrative officer or secretary-general or executive secretary of the national church organisation, responsible for daily operations or performance. The Clerk uses the title style The Reverend. The following ministers were elected and served as the Synod Clerk or Clerk of the General Assembly of the Presbyterian Church of Ghana:

No.	Synod Clerk / Clerk of the General Assembly	Tenure of Office
1	Nicholas Timothy Clerk	1918–32
2	D. E. Akwa	1933–40
3	M. A. Obeng	1941–49
4	Carl Henry Clerk	1950–54
5	A. L. N. Kwansa	1955–69
6	T. A. Osei	1970–74
7	R. K. Sah	1978–85
8	E. S. Mate-Kodjo	1985–95
9	Ofosu Adutwum	1995–97
10	Nii Teiko Dagadu (Ag.)	1997–99
11	Charles Gyang-Duah	1999–03
12	Herbert Oppong	2004–12
13	Samuel Ayete-Nyampong	2013–19
14	Godwin Nii Noi Odonkor	2019–25
15	David Aboagye-Danquah	2025–

== Notable people ==
- Gottlieb Ababio Adom
- Clement Anderson Akrofi
- Rose Akua Ampofo
- David Asante
- John Azumah
- Emilie Christaller
- Johann Gottlieb Christaller
- Alexander Worthy Clerk
- Carl Henry Clerk
- Nicholas T. Clerk (1930–2012)
- Nicholas Timothy Clerk (1862–1961)
- Peter Hall
- Regina Hesse
- Rose Ann Miller
- Catherine Mulgrave
- Theophilus Opoku
- Rosa and Fritz Ramseyer
- Carl Christian Reindorf
- Andreas Riis
- George Peter Thompson
- Rosina Widmann
- Johannes Zimmermann

== Outside Ghana ==
The church has a congregation in New York City, US and in Milton Keynes, England. There is also a congregation in Toronto, Canada. There is also a church in Riverside, California. Overall, the church has congregational overseas branches in the following presbyteries:

- North America and Australia
- Europe
- Africa
- Cuba
- India

== Gallery ==
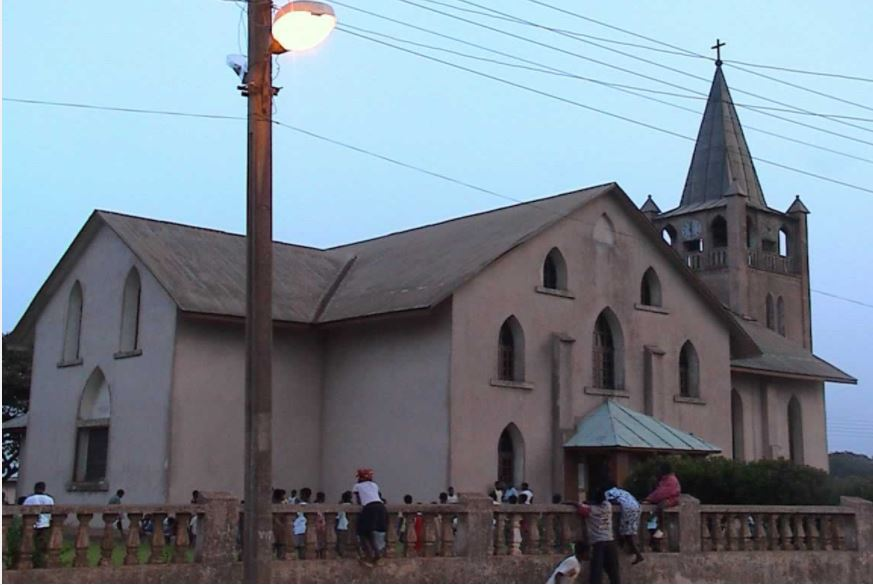
Christ Presbyterian Church, Akropong

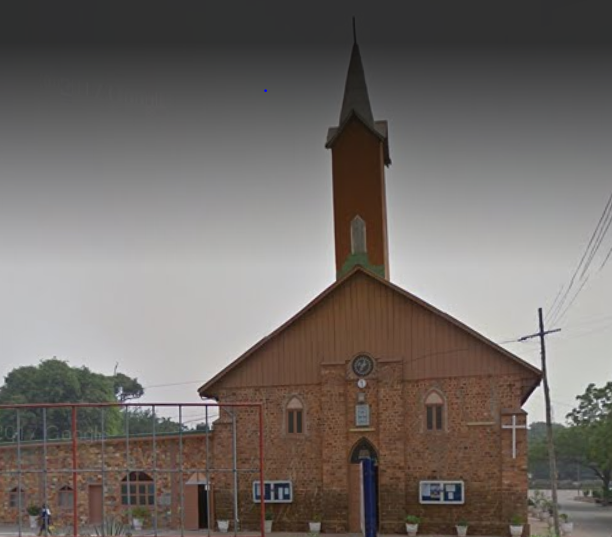
Ebenezer Presbyterian Church, Osu

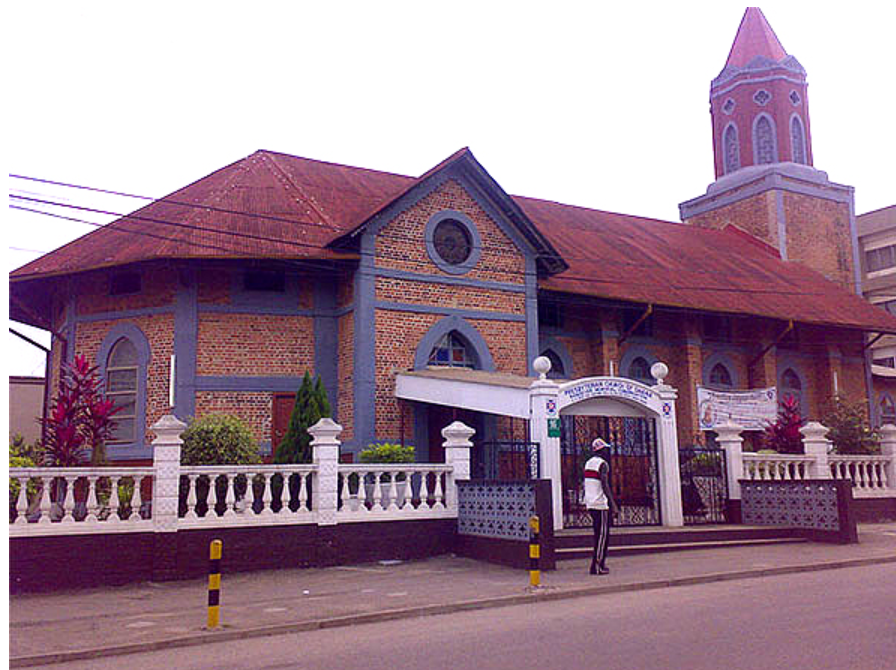
Ramseyer Memorial Presbyterian Church

== See also ==
- Basel Mission
- Christianity in Ghana
- Christian Messenger
- Christ Presbyterian Church, Akropong
- Ebenezer Presbyterian Church, Osu
- Ramseyer Memorial Presbyterian Church
- Evangelical Presbyterian Church, Ghana
- Methodist Church Ghana
