= John Azumah =

Ghanaian minister in the Presbyterian Church of Ghana

John Allembillah Azumah is an ordained Ghanaian minister in the Presbyterian Church of Ghana and associate professor of World Christianity and Islam. He is one of the leaders in Islam and Christian–Muslim relations and he is currently working on research in the area of World Christianity and Islam in the Global South.

== Biography ==
A native of Northern Ghana, Azumah grew up as a Muslim, in a Muslim family, and converted to Christianity when he was 17. He received an external diploma in Christian theology from Trinity Theological Seminary, Ghana with University of Ghana, Legon (1989), a M.A. (1994) and a Ph.D. (1998) from the University of Birmingham, United Kingdom.

In the ecclesiastical field he has served as an Evangelist for the Presbyterian Church of Ghana (1982–86), Second Minister for the Presbyterian Congregation in Sunyani (1989–90), the Minister In-Charge of the Presbyterian Congregation in London (1996–98), and the District Minister of Presbyterian Churches in London (2010–11). He has also served in a variety of other roles within the church. He was the Co-ordinator for PCG Northern Outreach Programme in Accra (1998–2000), the Pioneer Co-ordinator for Northern Outreach Programme in Kumasi 1990-93), and the Acting Director for the Presbyterian Lay Training Centre in Tamale (2003–04). He has as well served as the International Deputy Director of the Lausanne Movement in Africa (2004-07).

In the academic field he has taught at a number of different institutions. He has served in India as the Visiting Lecturer at SAIACS in Bangalore (2001–05), the Senior Lecturer at Henry Martyn Institute in Hyderabad (2000–01), and the Senior Lecturer at Union Biblical Seminary in Pune (2001–03). Additionally, he was also the Senior Research Fellow at the Akrofi-Christaller Institute in Ghana (2004–08), the Visiting Senior Lecturer at George Whitefield College in Cape Town (2001-12), the Visiting Senior Lecturer at Pentecost University College in Accra (2005–10), the Founding Director of Interfaith Research & Resource Centre in Accra (2006–08), the Director for the Centre of Islamic Studies in London (2008–11), and the Professor of World Christianity & Islam and Director of International Programs at Columbia Theological Seminary (2011–19). In 2019, he became the Founding Executive Director of The Sanneh Institute, at the University of Ghana and, co-currently in the 2019–2020 academic year, served as Visiting Professor of World Christianity at Yale Divinity School.

== Islam and Christianity ==
In addition to speaking around the world, Azumah has written a number of books and has contributed to a large range of publications. He is a strong advocate for ecumenical dialogue between Islam and Christianity.

He identifies five faces of Islam as: "the missional face (the face that seeks to convert the world to Islam), the mystical face (the face that focuses more on spiritual things), the ideological or political face (the face that seeks to occupy the public sphere by implementing sharia or Islamic law), the militant face (this is the face of Islam that seeks to achieve its ends by the use of violence), and the progressive face (this face is usually self-critical and seek to reread the Koran in light of present realities)." He believes that many Christians only see Islam through one of these faces and urges them to see Islam instead as an amalgamation of them all.

He has attributed his personal background, as a Christian convert from Islam, as helping him recognize the importance of nurturing dialogue between the two traditions. He states that "during difficult times foolish people build walls and wise people build bridges. My hope is that we have many more people who’ll be willing to build bridges." He continues to be a leader throughout the world in facilitating and encouraging interfaith dialogue and understanding.

== Publications ==
- The African Christian and Islam, with Lamin Sanneh (eds), (Nairobi: Langham Monographs, 2013).
- Islam and Christianity on the Edge: Talking Points in Christian-Muslim Relations into the 21st Century, with Peter Riddell, Sydney: Acorn Press, 2013.
- My Neighbour’s Faith: Islam Explained for Christians, HarperCollins Canada / Zondervan Books, April 2008.
- The Legacy of Arab-Islam in Africa: A Quest for Inter-Religious Dialogue, Oxford: Oneworld Publications, 2001.
- "Challenging Radical Islam: Islam’s relation to terrorism and violence", in First Things, Number 249 (Jan. 2015), pp. 33–38.
- "Boko Haram in Retrospect", in Islam and Christian-Muslim Relations, Vol. 26, Issue 1 (2015), pp. 33–52
- "Dialogue between Islam and Traditional African Religions", with Catherine Cornille, ed. in The Wiley-Blackwell Companion to Inter-Religious Dialogue. (Oxford: John Wiley & Sons, 2013), pp. 311–324.
- "Evangelical Christian Views and Attitudes Towards Christian–Muslim Dialogue" in Transformation, Vol. 29 Issue 2 (April 2012), pp. 128 – 139.
- "Incarnation and Translation in Islam and Christianity", with David Emmanuel Singh (ed.) in Jesus and the Incarnation: reflections of Christians from Islamic Context, (Oxford: Regnum Books International, 2011).
- "Christian Responses to Islam: A Struggle for the Soul of Christianity", in Church & Society in Asia Today, Vol. 13. No. 2 (Aug. 2010), pp. 83–94.
- "Following Jesus as Unique Lord and Saviour in a Broken Pluralistic World", in Evangelical Review of Theology, Vol. 31, No. 4 (2007), pp. 294–305.
- "Theological Foundations of Shari’a in Islam: Evangelical Christian Concerns and Reservations", in Anvil, Vol. 23 No. 2 (2006), pp. 101–111.
- "Christian Witness to Muslims: Rationale, approaches and strategies", in Missionalia, Vol. 34, No. 1 (April 2006), pp. 5–21.
- "Islamic Christology: A Case of Reverential Disavowal", in Journal of African Christian Thought, Vol. 8 No. 1 (June 2005), pp. 50–60.
- "Issues in Christian-Muslim Relations: Implications for Theological Formation in Africa", in Journal of African Christian Thought, Vol. 7 No. 2, Dec. 2004, pp. 30–8.
- "Islam and Religious Pluralism" in Dharma Deepika: South Asian Journal of Missiological Research, 2003 (No. 2) July – December, pp. 5–20.
- "The Integrity of Interfaith Dialogue", in Islam and Christian-Muslim Relations, Vol. 13, No. 3 (2002), pp. 169–80.
- "Controversy and Restraint in Ghana", in Transformation: An International Evangelical Dialogue on Mission and Ethics, Vol. 17, No. 1(2000) p. 23ff.
- "Minority Faiths in Islam", with Mark Laing (ed.) in The Indian Church in Context: Her Emergence, Growth and Mission, Contextual Theological Series No. 26 (Delhi: CMS/ ISPCK, 2002).
- "Christian-Muslim Relations in Ghana: Too Much Meat Does Not Spoil Soup", in Current Dialogue (WCC Publication), No. 36, December 2000.
