= Yaw Frimpong-Manso =

Ghanaian theologian and Presbyterian minister

The Very Rev. Dr. Yaw Frimpong-Manso
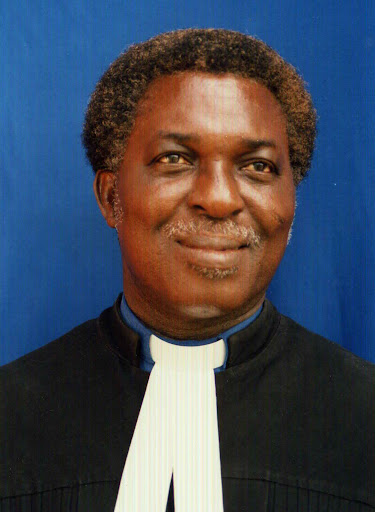

15th Moderator of the Presbyterian Church of Ghana
- In office 2004–2010
- Preceded by: Sam Prempeh
- Succeeded by: Emmanuel Martey

Personal details
- Born: Yaw Frimpong-Manso; 10 March 1951 (age 75) Domi, Ashanti Region, Gold Coast (Ghana)
- Spouse: Lucy Frimpong-Manso
- Children: 4
- Education: Wesley College, Kumasi; Trinity Theological Seminary, Legon (Dipl.-Theol.); University of Ghana (B.A.); University of Aberdeen (MA, PhD)
- Occupation: Theologian; Moderator of the General Assembly of the Presbyterian Church of Ghana (2004–2010)

Yaw Frimpong-Manso (born 10 March 1951) is a Ghanaian theologian, Biblical scholar, and Presbyterian minister. He served as the Moderator of the General Assembly of Presbyterian Church of Ghana from 2004 to 2010.

== Early life and education ==
Frimpong-Manso was born on 10 March 1951 to Opanin Osei Akwasi and Mercy Amma Akyama at Domi, a town in the Ashanti Region of Ghana. He had both his primary and secondary education in Ghana from 1957 to 1970. In 1971, he entered Wesley College, Kumasi where he obtained his Teachers' Training Certificate in 1973. In 1979, he pursued a Diploma program at the Trinity Theological Seminary, Legon, Ghana completing in 1982. From 1985 to 1988, he studied at the University of Ghana, where he obtained his bachelor's degree in Religions and Sociology, graduating with an honours 2:1 degree. From 1990 to 1995, Frimpong-Manso was able to pursue a master's degree and a doctorate in Old Testament and Hebrew at the University of Aberdeen's Hebrew and Semitic Languages Department through a fellowship from the Langham Trust and Tearfund.

== Career ==
Frimpong-Manso began as a pupil teacher. He taught Agricultural Science from 1970 to 1971, and a classroom teacher from 1973 to 1975, after he had obtained his Teachers' Training Certificate. In 1975 he joined the New Life for All (NLFA) upon secondment from the Ghana Evangelism Committee. He remained with the NFLA until 1979.

=== Ministry ===
In 1982, he was ordained Minister of the Presbyterian Church of Ghana, and two years later, he was appointed a full time pastor. Following his ordination, he served as a District Minister and also a Presbyterian Secondary School proprietor until 1985. That same year, he became a Student-Minister. He studied while being attached to the Dansoman and North Kaneshie Presbyterian Congregations. In 1988, he was appointed a Regional Manager of the Presbyterian Schools in the Ho District, and also the Minister-in-charge of the district. He served in these capacities from 1988 to 1990. In 1996, he took up an appointment as a lecturer at the Trinity Theological Seminary, Legon. There, he taught Old Testament and Hebrew, and a year later, he doubled as the Minister-in-charge of the Presbyterian Church in Agbogbloshie. He served in both capacities until 2001 when he was made the Presbytery Chairperson (Moderator) of the Asante Presbytery of the Presbyterian Church of Ghana. He held this appointment until 2004 when he was elevated to the position of moderator of the Presbyterian Church of Ghana, and remained in that position until 2010. In 2011, Frimpong-Manso was transferred to Australia to oversee the Presbyterian Church in Sydney. After serving for about six months in Australia, he returned to Ghana where he was put in charge of the Kwadaso District of the Presbyterian Church of Ghana. He later joined the Emmanuel Presbyterian Reformed Church, Bronx, New York, where he works as the congregation's head pastor. Frimpong-Manso resigned from the Presbyterian Church in 2015 over allegations of him supporting same sex marriages, which is against the tenets of the church. Frimpong-Manso however, denied these allegations claiming there was no way he was going to allow same sex marriages as an Old Testament scholar.

== Publications ==
Frimpong-Manso's interests are in the fields of Old Testament and Hebrew Studies, Evangelism, and the Administration of the church. He has authored various books, some of which include:

- Tend the Flock;
- Those Who Have Ears;
- Pulpit Insights;
- Tell the Nations;
- The Leader as an Agent of Change;
- Stewardship in the Presbyterian Church of Ghana;
- Moral and Religious Education,1, 2, and 3 (Ghanaian basic School Text Books).

== Personal life ==
Frimpong-Manso is married to Lucy Frimpong-Manso. Together, they have three sons and one daughter.
