= E. M. L. Odjidja =

Presbyterian minister from Ghana

The Very Reverend Edward Martinus Lartey Odjidja
- Born: 16 October 1900; Sra, Ghana
- Died: 15 April 1987 (aged 86); Odumase-Krobo, Ghana
- Education: Presbyterian Training College, Akropong; Abetifi Seminary
- Occupations: Educationist; Minister; Author
- Organization: Presbyterian Church of Ghana
- Title: Moderator of the Presbyterian Church of Ghana
- Term: 1959–1966
- Predecessor: E. Max Dodu
- Successor: J. K. Sintim-Misa
- Spouse: Dorothy Malm

Edward Martinus Lartey Odjidja (16 October 1900 – 15 April 1987) was a Ghanaian teacher and presbyterian minister who was the ninth Moderator of the Presbyterian Church of Ghana from 1959 to 1966.

== Early life ==
Edward Martinus Lartey Odjidja was born at Sra, a small town near Somanya on 16 October 1900. He was the third of ten children and the eldest of five sons of the local Presbyterian manse. His father, Rev. Winfried Tekpenor Odjidja, a presbyterian minister, had married his mother; Louise Kai Ablorh, a daughter of a presbyterian minister, four years before Edward's birth. Louise's father was Rev. Daniel Ablorh who was the first ordained minister of the Presbyterian church at Teshie and her grandfather, Paulo Mohenu was an evangelist who is celebrated by the church.

His mother gave him lessons at home until he turned ten and was enrolled at the Basel Mission Junior School in Odumase, Krobo. At thirteen years, he was admitted into the Basel Mission Boarding School in Christianborg. However, exactly a month later the resident minister of Odumase, Rev. Johansen and his own father, Rev. W. T. Odjidja ordered that all students at Christianborg from Krobo, Shai and Ada areas should be sent to the specially built Bana Hills Presbyterian Middle Boarding School. From there, he continued to the Presbyterian Training College in Akropong and thereafter studied at the Abetifi Seminary.

== Career ==
In 1921 he was posted to teach at the Salem Middle School in Osu. He married Dorothy Malm in 1928 whom he was to have ten children with. Odjidja became headmaster of his alma mater, Bana Hill after he succeeded S. S. Odonkor and occupied this post from 1931 to 1932. From 1933 to 1934, he was the first headmaster of the Presbyterian Middle School in Kumasi. In this period, he was elected the national chairman of the Presbyterian Teachers Union.

Further responsibility was given to him when was appointed to the titled role of a Special Manager of Presbyterian schools. He was initially sent to work in this role in the Akuapem Area before being sent to Ada, Ga, Krobo and Shai Area. Odjidja undertook and was awarded the University of London's Diploma in Education whilst on an eighteen-month stay away in the United Kingdom. After this, he was promoted as Supervisor of Schools.

In April 1952 he announced his decision to retire from the educational field so as to serve the Presbyterian church as a minister at a Presbytery gathering at Anum. Odjidja exited the post of Supervisor of Schools at the end of October 1952. On 11th November 1952, he was ordained a Presbyterian minister. After serving as a pastor to congregations in Odumase, Bisa and Kumasi, he was elected the ninth Moderator of the Presbyterian Church in 1959. He performed the duties of this office from 1959 to 1966 when his role as Moderator ended. He was chairman of the Christian Council of Ghana from 1965 to 1967.

== Global policy ==
He was one of the signatories of the agreement to convene a convention for drafting a world constitution. As a result, for the first time in human history, a World Constituent Assembly convened to draft and adopt the Constitution for the Federation of Earth.

== Honours ==
In 1974 Odjidja received the Grand Medal from the State of Ghana for his leadership services. A hall at Trinity Theological Seminary, Legon, was named Odjidja Hall in his honour.

== Death ==
Odjidja died on 15 April 1987. He had spent the last fifteen years of his life at a residence in Odumasi-Krobo named Bhamiyee House. A burial service was held for him at Zimmerman Memorial Church in Odumase-Krobo on the 9th of May of the same year.

Religious titles
Preceded by E. Max Dodu	Moderator of the Presbyterian Church of Ghana; 1959–1966	Succeeded by J. K. Sintim-Misa
