= Cephas Narh Omenyo =

Ghanaian academic and Presbyterian minister

The Very Reverend Prof. Cephas Narh Omenyo
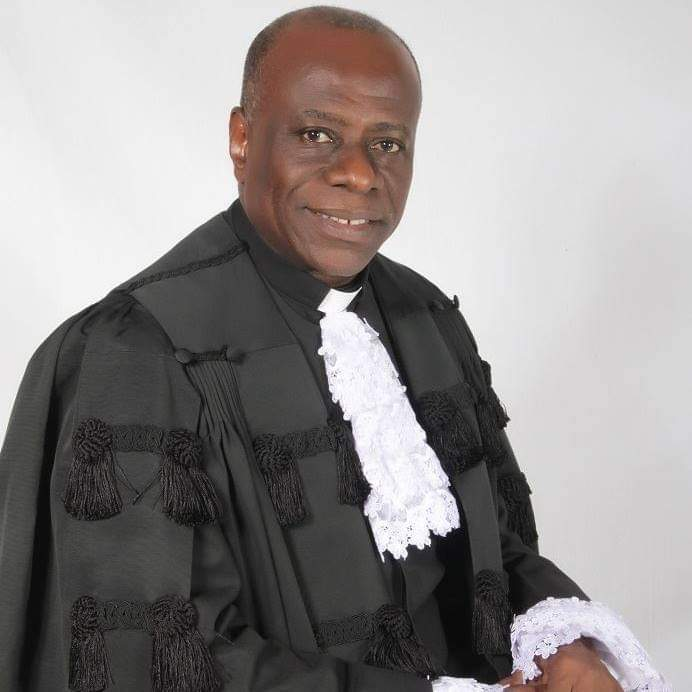

17th Moderator of the Presbyterian Church of Ghana
- In office 2016–2018
- Preceded by: Emmanuel Martey
- Succeeded by: Joseph Obiri Yeboah Mante

Personal details
- Spouse: Rosekel Omenyo
- Education: Trinity Theological Seminary, Legon; University of Ghana (BA, MPhil); University of Utrecht (PhD)
- Occupation: Professor; Theologian
- Known for: 17th Moderator of the General Assembly of the Presbyterian Church of Ghana

Cephas Narh Omenyo is a Ghanaian theologian and academic who was the 17th Moderator of the Presbyterian Church of Ghana from August 2016 to August 2018.

== Early life ==
Omenyo was born to Cephas Tettey Mate Omenyo and Felicia Namo Omenyo. He is the fifth among 10 children (seven male and three female).

== Education ==
Omenyo had his basic and secondary education at the Presbyterian Primary, Middle and Secondary schools at Bechem in the Brong Ahafo Region respectively. He completed his sixth-form education in Science at the Sunyani Secondary School.

Omenyo started his theological education at the then Trinity College (now Trinity Theological Seminary) from 1982 to 1985. He graduated from the University of Ghana with BA degree in Sociology and the Study of Religions. He obtained his M.Phil. (Study of Religions) from the University of Ghana in 1994 and his Ph.D. from the University of Utrecht, the Netherlands, in 2002.

== Career ==
Omenyo was commissioned into the ministry of the Presbyterian Church of Ghana in June 1985 at Teshie and ordained in 1987 at the Unity Congregation, Tamale.

Omenyo was appointed Lecturer in the Department for the Study of Religions, University of Ghana in October 1995. He was promoted to the rank of Senior Lecturer in 2001, Associate Professor in 2006 and Full Professor in 2013. Omenyo was appointed Professor Extraordinary by the University of Stellenbosch, South Africa, for an initial period of three years (1 October 2015 to 30 September 2018). He has written more than 56 scholarly works including three books.

Omenyo has held several guest professorships including the following universities: Department of Theology and Religious Studies, University of Botswana, Gaborone, Botswana (September 2008–August 2009); Central and Eastern European Institute for Mission Studies (CIMS) and Karoli Gaspar University of the Reformed Church in Hungary, Budapest, Hungary (2008), and University of Basel, Switzerland (November 2015). He was the Occupant of John A. Mackay Chair of World Christianity, Princeton Theological Seminary, Princeton (September 2007–May 2008).

=== Moderator ===
Omenyo was elected Moderator of the Presbyterian Church of Ghana in August 2016.

On 17 August 2018, Omenyo became indisposed and the position of Moderator of the Presbyterian Church of Ghana was declared vacant by the General Assembly Council of the Presbyterian Church. On 23 August 2018 Joseph Obiri Yeboah Mante, immediate past President of the Trinity Theological Seminary, was elected to succeed Omenyo as the 18th Moderator of the General Assembly of the Presbyterian Church of Ghana at the end of the 18th General Assembly in Akropong-Akuapem.

== Personal life ==
Omenyo is married to Rosekel, a teacher and librarian. They have two sons and a daughter.

Religious titles
Preceded by Emmanuel Martey	Moderator of the Presbyterian Church of Ghana; 2016 - 2018	Succeeded by Joseph Obiri Yeboah Mante
