= Bompata =

Coordinates: 6°38′N 1°04′W

- Interactive map of Bompata
- Country: Ghana
- Region: Ashanti Region

Bompata is a town in the Ashanti Region of Ghana. The town is known for the Bompata Presby Secondary School. The school is a second cycle institution. Nana Effah-Apenteng has served as the traditional ruler (paramount chief) for the Bompata Traditional area since 1976.
