= Nana Effah-Apenteng =

Ghanaian diplomat

11th Ghana Permanent Representative to the United Nations
- In office 2000–2007
- President: Jerry Rawlings (till 2001); John Kufuor (from 2001)
- Preceded by: Jack B. Wilmot
- Succeeded by: Leslie Kojo Christian

Paramount Chief of Bompata Traditional Area
- Incumbent
- Assumed office 1976

Personal details
- Born: Bompata, Ghana
- Children: 3
- Education: University of Ghana
- Profession: Diplomat

Nana Effah-Apenteng was the Permanent Representative of Ghana to the United Nations between May 2000 and 2007.

== Education ==
Effah-Apenteng attended the University of Ghana at Legon where he obtained a Bachelor's degree in Political science in 1968. He went on to achieve a Master's degree in African Studies at the same university in 1970. While in the foreign service, he received a diploma in public administration from the Ghana Institute of Management and Public Administration in 1974. He completed the Foreign Service Officers' Course in International Relations at Oxford the following year.

== Career ==
Effah-Apenteng joined the Ghanaian Foreign Service in 1970 after his university education. He served in various capacities at various stations including Ghana's embassies in Moscow and Rome. He was actively involved in the organisation of the tenth Non-Aligned Movement Ministerial Conference held in Accra in 1991. He became Deputy Chief of Mission at the Ghanaian Embassy in Washington in the United States of America between 1993 and 1997. He then served as the Supervising Director of Administration at the Foreign Ministry in Ghana prior to his appointment as Permanent Representative to the United Nations.

== Other roles ==
Effah-Apenteng became the traditional ruler (paramount chief) of the Bompata Traditional Area of Ashanti in 1976.

== Family ==
Effah-Apenteng was born at Bompata in the Asante Akim South District of the Ashanti Region of Ghana and is married with three sons.

Diplomatic posts
Preceded by Jack B. Wilmot	Permanent Representative of Ghana to the United Nations; 2000 — 2007	Succeeded by Leslie Kojo Christian
