= Evangelical Lutheran Church of Ghana =

Ghanaian Lutheran denomination

The Evangelical Lutheran Church of Ghana is a Lutheran denomination in Ghana. It is a member of the Lutheran World Federation, which it joined in 2004, though later making the decision to leave the LWF. It is also a member of the International Lutheran Council.

The ELCG has around 6500 baptized members.
