= Kwaso, Ghana =

Coordinates: 6.632°N 1.450°W

Kwaso
- Village
- Interactive map of Kwaso
- Country: Ghana
- Administrative Region: Ashanti
- Municipal District: Ejisu-Juabe

Kwaso is a town in the Ejisu-Juaben Municipal District in the Ashanti region, Ghana. In Kwaso there is a museum dedicated to Yaa Asantewaa.
