= Presbyterian University, Ghana =

Multi-campus university in Ghana

Presbyterian University, Ghana (PUG)
- Presbyterian University, Ghana
- Motto: Discipline in Leadership
- Type: Private/Public
- Established: 2003 November 23; 22 years ago
- Affiliations: Presbyterian Church of Ghana
- Chairman: Nii Ashie Kotey
- Chancellor: Rt. Rev. Dr. Abraham Nana Opare Kwakye, the Moderator of PCG
- Vice-president: / Pro Vice-Chancellor Prof.Frank Sena Arku https://www.presbyuniversity.edu.gh/site/professor-frank-s-arku/
- Vice-Chancellor: Prof. John Ofosu-Anim https://www.presbyuniversity.edu.gh/site/prof-john-ofosu-anim/
- Location: Abetifi-Kwahu, Ghana; 6.6763°N 0.7446°W
- Campus: Okwahu (Abetifi), Asante-Akyem (Agogo), Akuapem (Akropong), Tema, Kumasi
- Website: www.presbyuniversity.edu.gh

The Presbyterian University, Ghana (formerly Presbyterian University College, Ghana) is a partially private & public university with multi- campuses and its headquarters located at Abetifi-Kwahu in the Eastern Region of Ghana. It is one of the new universities in Ghana granted accreditation by the Ghana Tertiary Education Commission – GTEC (formerly National Accreditation Board-NAB). It was established by the Presbyterian Church of Ghana (PCG) on 23 November 2003 and inaugurated on 27 March 2004 by the former president of Ghana in that republic, John Agyekum Kufuor.

On Tuesday, 30 August 2022, the university was granted a Presidential Charter by President of Ghana Nana Akufo Addo. It has been ranked the best private university in Ghana and third best after the University of Ghana and KNUST by world university ranking website webometrics.

== History and Background ==
Per historical accounts, the Presbyterian Church of Ghana established Ghana's first elementary school in the country in 1843 which resulted in the institutionalization of formal education in the country. In 1848, the church founded a teacher-catechist seminary, the Basel Mission Seminary, later known as the Presbyterian Training College (PTC) at Akropong as the second higher educational institution in West Africa after Fourah Bay College in Sierra Leone. This development led to the establishment of several primary and secondary schools and colleges of education through a strategic partnership with the Ghanaian government; specifically, 1,886 schools made up of 490 kindergartens, 973 primary school, 388 junior secondary schools, 25 senior secondary schools, five vocational institutes and five colleges of education. The church has also been instrumental in providing agricultural and health services for citizens.

The initial plan was to upgrade the Presbyterian Training College at Akropong to a full-fledged university like Fourah Bay College but that did no come into fruition. More than a century and a half later, the Synod of the Presbyterian Church during its 1996 conference voted to establish an actual university culminating in the setting up of an Implementation Committee in 1998. The university sought to augment higher education services to meet to increasing demand for college education. Despite its religious affiliation, the university college welcome students of all backgrounds, ethnicity, religion and geography. The school runs a fee-paying, multi-campus, residential or hostel system in partnership with private enterprise. Its academic programs are in humanities and social sciences, particularly theology, language and mission studies. The school also offers programs in science and technology including health sciences, medicine, dentistry and nursing.

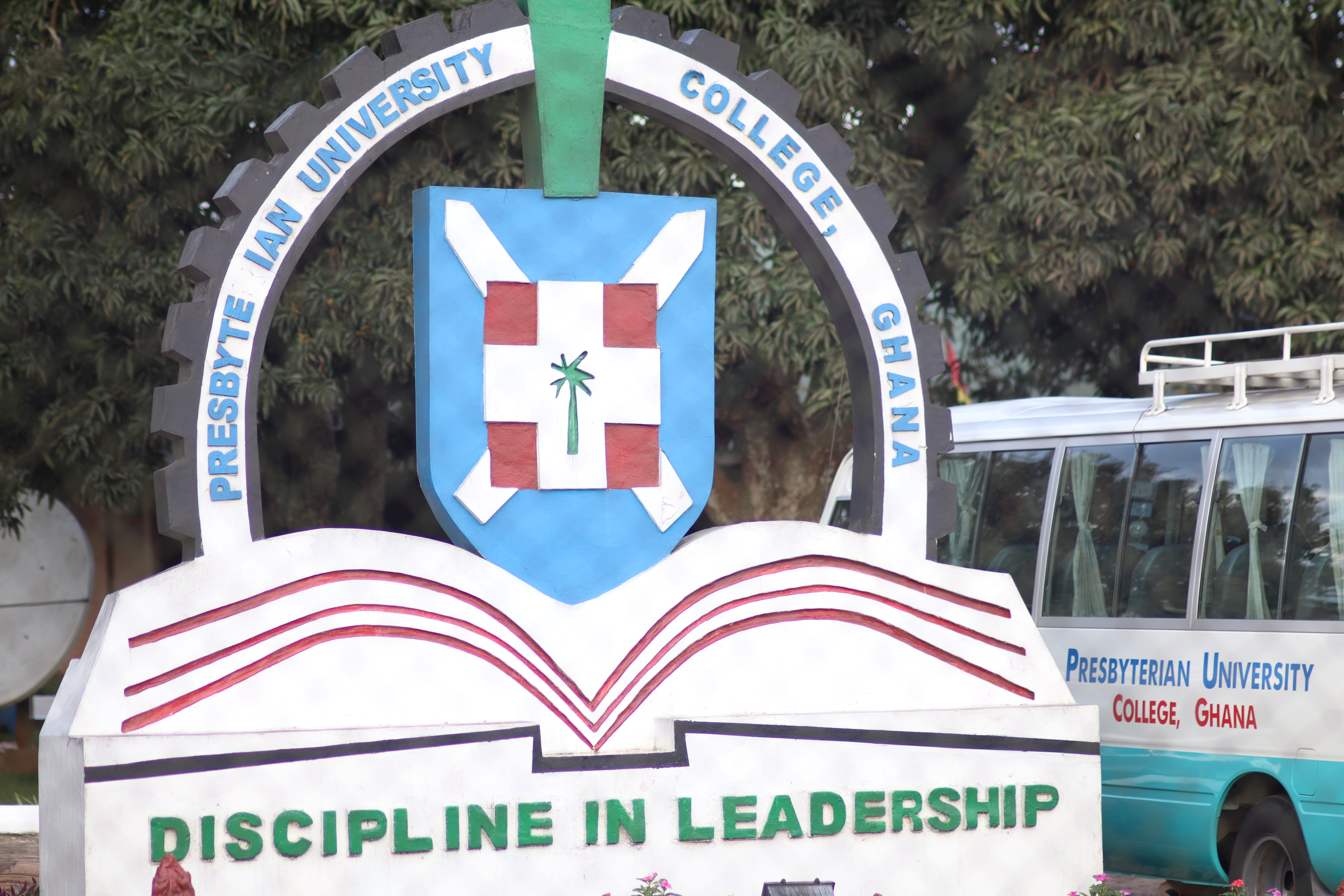
Presbyterian University College

== Objectives ==
The stated objectives in the institutions statutes are as follows:

- "To provide for and promote University education, learning and research,
- To acquire and disseminate knowledge and information,
- To foster relationships with other institutions of higher learning, persons and bodies.
- To produce disciplined, self-motivated individuals and leaders with moral and intellectual values in the realization of their responsibilities to God, fellow citizens and the state."

Furthermore, the principles underpinning the university's founding include:

- "that in determining the courses and programmes to be taught emphasis shall be placed on a balanced pursuit of the humanities, the basic sciences, the development, application and management of technology, which are of special relevance to the needs and aspirations of Ghanaians in particular, and others in general;
- that higher education in this University shall be available to all Ghanaians and others who are capable of benefiting from it;
- that research shall be undertaken in all courses which are taught in the University but with attention to courses which relate to the social, cultural, economic, scientific, technical and other problems which exists in Ghana or elsewhere in Africa;
- that the fruits of research and knowledge generally shall be spread abroad by the publication of books and papers and by any other suitable means;
- that students shall be taught methods of critical and independent thought, while being made aware that they have a responsibility to use their education for the service of the Church, country and humanity;
- that as far as practicable the students shall be trained to be innovative and entrepreneurial to enhance socio- economic development;
- that the University shall operationalize local, regional and global needs assessment as the basis for practical and multi-disciplinary outreach programmes in the local and regional communities;
- that the University shall inculcate in the student ethical, moral and intellectual values that manifest in courage, discipline, fair play, self motivation and respect for the dignity of an honest life."

== Organization ==
The university has five campuses at Abetifi-Kwahu, Akropong-Akuapem in the Eastern Region, Agogo – Asante Akyem in the Ashanti Region, the city campus at Tema in the Greater Accra Region and Kumasi Santasi Ashanti Region. Each of these campuses has its own set of faculties and other facilities.

== OKwahu Campus ==
=== Faculty of Science and Technology ===
- Department of Information and Communication Technology and Mathematics
  - BSc. ICT
  - BSc. Mathematics with Statistics
  - BSc. Mathematics with Accounting
- Department of Computer Engineering
  - BSc. Computer Engineering

=== School of Business ===
- Department of Business Administration
  - BSc. Business Administration (Accounting & Finance)
  - BSc. Business Administration (Banking & Finance)
  - BSc. Business Administration (General Management)
  - BSc. Business Administration (Human Resource Management)
  - BSc. Business Administration (Marketing)
- Department of Agribusiness
  - BSc. Agricbusiness

== Asante Akyem Campus ==
=== Faculty of Health and Medical Sciences ===
- Department of Physician Assistantship
  - BSc. Physician Assistantship
- Department of Nursing & Midwifery
  - BSc. Nursing
  - BSc. Midwifery

== Akuapem Campus ==
=== Faculty of Education ===
- Department of Social Studies
  - BEd. Social Studies

=== Faculty of Development Studies ===
- Department of International Development Studies
  - BSc. International Development Studies
- Department of Environmental and Natural Resource Management
  - BSc. Environmental and Natural Resource Management

== Kumasi Campus ==
Faculty of Law

- Bachelor of Law (LLB)

== Tema Campus ==
- BSc. Business Administration (Accounting & Finance)
- BSc. Business Administration (Banking & Finance)
- BSc. Business Administration (General Management)
- BSc. Business Administration (Human Resource Management)
- BSc. Business Administration (Marketing)

== School of Graduate Studies ==
- MEd. Educational Studies
- MPhil. Educational Studies
- MA. International Development Studies (IDS)
- MSc. Environmental Health & Sanitation
- MSc. Natural Resources Management
- MSc. Financial Risk Management
- Master of Public Health (MPH)

== Affiliations ==
The university until Tuesday, 30 August 2022 was affiliated to the University of Ghana, University of Cape Coast and Kwame Nkrumah University of Science and Technology

== Presidential Charter ==
On Tuesday, 30 August 2022, the university, with two others, was granted a Presidential Charter by President Akufo Addo, in a small ceremony in Accra. The charter granted the university gives it a legal authorization to award its own degree or diploma certificates.

== See also ==
- List of universities in Ghana
- University of Ghana
