= Rudolf Fisch =

Swiss medical missionary (1856–1946)

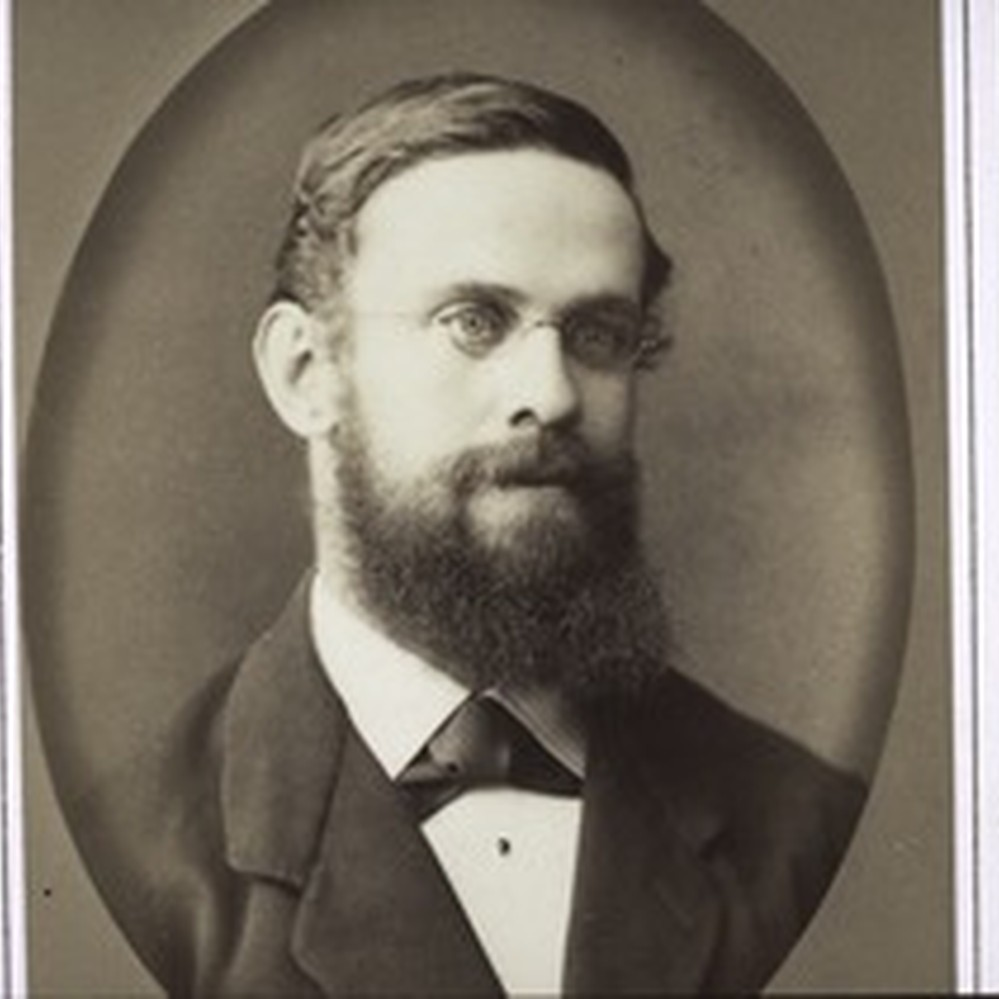
Rudolph Fisch Portrait

Samuel Rudolf Fisch (November 18, 1856 – December 2, 1946) was a Swiss-born physician, preacher, and medical missionary to Ghana. Fisch built the Basel Mission Hospital in Aburi, Ghana in 1885. In Ghana, Fisch pioneered the application of prophylaxis for Malaria and founded the Blue Cross (originally named “Anidaho Fekuw” translated as “The Temperance Movement”) with a core mission of fighting against alcoholism and other substances.

In addition, Fisch was a well known author contributing to Archiv für Schiffs- und Tropenhygiene, a German medical journal focused on tropical medicine, maritime health, and hygiene. He published a well read guide to health in the tropics: Tropische Krankheiten: Anleitung zu ihrer Verhütung und Behandlung which translates to "Tropical Diseases: Guide to their Prevention and Treatment".

== Early life and education ==
Born in the Aargau canton of Switzerland, Fisch initially trained as a saddler before joining the Basel Mission in early adulthood.

Fisch's medical training began in 1880, where he studied medicine at the University of Basel, earning a Doctor of Medicine degree with a dissertation in ophthalmology.

== Mission and legacy ==
Rudolf Fisch began his missionary work in 1885 when he arrived at Aburi on the Gold Coast, then a British Colony, now Ghana, with two chests of medical instruments and drugs. He had been sent by the mission to be based at Aburi, a town in the Akuapim South Municipal District from 1885 to 1911. He was the first member of the mission with scientific training. He was to serve as both the medic and a religious missionary.

Aburi, located about 25 miles inland from Accra with elevation of 1,450 feet above sea level, was chosen as the headquarters of the Basel Mission medical activities due to its central location and healthy environment. A two-story sanatorium for European missionaries and an outpatient clinic for Africans were constructed, forming the first European medical facility away from coastal towns of the Gold Coast. Fisch began daily consultation hours, treating a range of cases, from leprosy and mental illness to injuries and tropical diseases. His work was attended by all social classes with some patients traveling up to twenty hours to seek his care. In his first year Fisch reported treating over 600 African patients. By 1902 the outpatient count increased to 4,002, alongside 36 inpatients.

Fisch oversaw the construction of a mission hospital in 1900, which included four patient rooms, surgery, and a clay house for overflow patients and their families. His commitment to delivering accessible healthcare extended beyond the hospital. He went on thirty medical tours in 1902 alone. His patient load continued to grow, surpassing 7,800 outpatients and 62 inpatients by 1906. Fisch appealed to the Basel Mission Committee for expanded facilities and additional staff. Fisch also trained African medical assistants, many of whom were recruited from former patients or graduates of Basel Mission schools. These assistants contributed to the introduction of mission medicine to their local communities.

In 1909 the medical team in Aburi grew with the arrival of surgeon Theodor Müller, who, alongside Fisch, increased the hospital's surgical capacity to over 400 operations annually. By this time the hospital handled approximately 24,000 outpatient treatments each year. Overcrowding remained an issue, leading to a new, modern hospital with expanded facilities, including X-ray equipment. This project was supported by a donation of 250,000 Swiss Francs from the Basel Mission Trading Company. Its completion was delayed until 1928 due to World War I.

== Legacy ==
Fisch influenced missionary training and management as well as colonial administration by advocating for higher wages and the support of families relocating to the mission. He believed this would reduce alcohol use and prostitution. In 1906 Fisch founded Akan Anidaho Fekuw, which translates to “The Temperance Movement.” This organization later turned into The Ghana Blue Cross Society. It is affiliated with the International Blue Cross Society, a Switzerland-based international Christian organization whose mission is to fight against alcoholism and other substance abuse. Akan was the first non-European Blue Cross organization.

Rudolf Fisch released four versions of his published book Tropische Krankheiten (Tropical Diseases) between 1891 and 1912. The book explores the causes, progression, prevention, and treatment of "the four most prevalent diseases in Africa." These diseases included malaria, dysentery, and conditions affecting the liver and spleen. The book influenced the ideology of tropical medicine during a time when medical professionals were shifting away from miasma theories to germ theory. Fisch’s work bridged these ideologies. In his book he claimed that malaria was caused by parasitic protozoa, as identified by Charles Louis Alphonse Laveran in 1880, while also crediting environmental factors like soil, humidity, and human activity in its proliferation. Tropische Krankheiten also provided practical advice about tropical hygiene, urging European settlers and travelers to adhere to health precautions to avoid tropical diseases.

Fisch also contributed to a German medical journal called Archiv für Schiffs- und Tropenhygiene (Archive for Ship and Tropical Hygiene). An article published in 1900 highlighted Fisch’s findings on quinine prophylaxis, recommending its broad use among European settlers in tropical colonies. This methodology eventually became a centerpiece of tropical medicine.

In the same publication Fisch challenged Robert Koch’s theory that black water fever resulted from "quinine poisoning." Fisch argued that most cases of black water fever occurred in individuals who rarely used quinine, defending the medication as an effective preventive measure.

== Late life and death ==
In 1914 Fisch was offered a permanent position as preacher at the Protestant Society in the Canton of Zurich in Wädenswil, which he accepted. He worked there until 1920. He moved to Horgen where he worked for the remainder of his career until his retirement in 1931 at the age of 75. Fisch died in Wädenswil on December 2, 1946, two weeks after his 90th birthday.
