= Joseph Obiri Yeboah Mante =

Ghanaian theologian and Presbyterian minister

The Rt. Rev. Prof. Joseph Obiri Yeboah Mante
- Born: 9 November 1957 (age 68)
- Other name: J. O. Y. Mante
- Education: Claremont Graduate University (M.A., MPhil, Ph.D.)
- Occupations: Presbyterian minister Theologian; Lecturer
- Spouse: Florence Mante

Ecclesiastical career
- Church: Presbyterian Church of Ghana
- Ordained: 1981
- Offices held: Moderator of the General Assembly, Presbyterian Church of Ghana (2018 - 2024)

Joseph Obiri Yeboah Mante also known as J.O.Y. Mante (born 9 November 1957) is a Ghanaian theologian and Presbyterian minister who served as the 18th Moderator of the General Assembly of the Presbyterian Church of Ghana (PCG), equivalent to the chief executive officer or managing director of the national church organisation. Prior to his appointment as moderator he served as the President of the Trinity Theological Seminary, Legon for 7 years. In August 2018, Joseph Obiri Yeboah Mante was elected the new Moderator of the General Assembly of the Presbyterian Church of Ghana (PCG), to succeed Cephas Narh Omenyo, the then incumbent, who had been ill for over a year and the General Assembly had to take a decision to declare the moderator seat vacant to allow new leadership.

== Early life and education ==
J. O Y. Mante was born on 9 November 1957. He is a native of Larteh Akuapem in the Eastern Region of Ghana and Kokofu in the Ashanti Region of Ghana. He holds a Master of Arts degree in Theology, a Master of Philosophy degree in Philosophy of Religion and Doctor of Philosophy (PhD) in Systematic Theology all from the Claremont Graduate University, Claremont, California in USA.

== Academia ==
Mante served as an Adjunct lecturer at the Department for the Study of Religions at University of Ghana. He lectured at the Trinity Theological Seminary, Legon for more than 24 years, serving as the Academic Dean of the Seminary for 9 years before serving as the President of the Trinity Theological Seminary Legon for 7 years from September 2011 to 1 August 2018. in 2017, whilst serving as President of the seminary he questioned the removal of Moral Education from the school curriculum and attributed the unruly behaviour of students on campuses to that decision. He has served on several boards and councils of higher education and ministry, including Chairman of the Governing Council of Presbyterian College of Education, Akropong (2006-2014), Chairman of the Governing Council of Presbyterian Women’s College of Education, Aburi (2008-2015) and a member of the Governing Council of the Presbyterian University College (2007-2013).

Mante was a member of Ghana's National Accreditation Board and served on several of the board's committees including Accreditation Committee, Quality Assurance Committee, Institutional Visits Committee, Administration Committee, and Finance Committee. He chairs the Ethics in Research Committee of the University of Ghana, a position he has held since 2013. He is a member of the American Academy of Religion, British Ethics Society, Society for the Study of Theology, and the editorial board of the Trinity Journal of Church and Society.

== Ministry ==
Mante was ordained as a minister of the Presbyterian Church of Ghana in 1981 and has since served the church in different capacities. He has served as resident minister in different places within PCG both in Ghana and outside Ghana, including Ramseyer Memorial Presbyterian Church, Adum, Kumasi, District Pastor in Obuasi, Claremount - California, Fontana - California, Trinity United Church Legon, Atomic Hills Congregation, Accra and the Faith Congregation at Shiashie in Accra.

From 2006 to 2011, he also served as the Presbytery Chairperson, which is equivalent to a Bishop, in the Akuapem Presbytery of the Presbyterian Church of Ghana. Within that period he also served as a member of the Church’s General Assembly Council.

He was the host of a religious TV talk show dubbed “In the Light” on GTV for 4 years.

=== Moderator of PCG ===
In August 2018, he was elected and declared as the new Moderator of the Presbyterian Church of Ghana to succeed Cephas Narh Omenyo. After receiving 156 nominations as against Godwin Nii Noi Odonkor and Victor Okoe Abbey who had 28 and 19 nominations respectively, the two stepped down for a popular acclamation of a Yes or No vote, of which he received a total of 195 Yes and 13 No votes representing 93.75% of votes cast to be declared as the Moderator-elect.

He was inducted into office as the 18th Moderator of the Presbyterian Church of Ghana on 23 December 2018 at the Akropong Presbyterian Grace Congregation church in Akropong–Akuapem, Eastern Region.

In 2019, he called for the restructuring of the university curriculum in Ghana to include entrepreneurship to help students to come up with their own initiatives after completing their degrees.

== Personal life ==
Joseph Obiri Yeboah Mante is married to Florence Mante, with whom he has three children and co-founded the Adom Foundation Ghana, a non-governmental organisation (NGO) to help needy children.
