= Ramseyer Memorial Presbyterian Church =

Presbyterian Church in Kumasi, Ghana

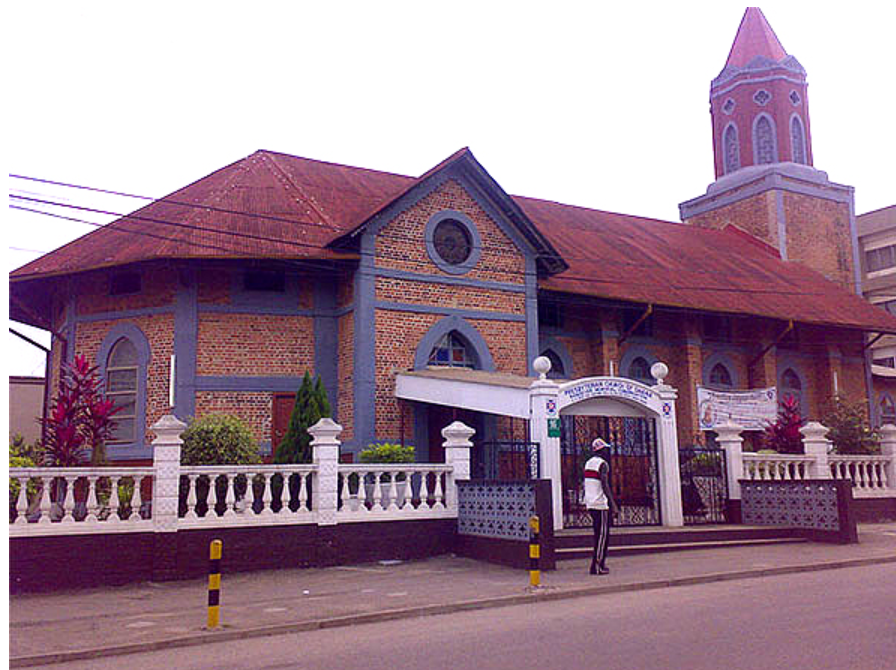
- Ramseyer Memorial Presbyterian Church
- 6.6894°N 1.6216°W
- Location: Mission Road, Adum, Kumasi
- Country: Ghana
- Denomination: Presbyterian Church of Ghana
- Previous denomination: Basel Evangelical Missionary Society
- Website: Ramseyer Memorial Presbyterian Church

History
- Former names: Basel Mission Church, Kumasi; Ebenezer Presbyterian Church
- Founded: 1896; 130 years ago
- Founders: Fritz Ramseyer; Basel Mission

Architecture
- Architect: Karl Epting
- Architectural type: Brick Romanesque
- Years built: 1902–1907

The Ramseyer Memorial Presbyterian Church, originally named the Basel Mission Church, Kumasi and later the Ebenezer Presbyterian Church, is a historic Protestant church located in the suburb of Adum in Kumasi, the capital of the Ashanti Region of Ghana. The church is affiliated to the Presbyterian Church of Ghana. It was founded in 1896 by Fritz Ramseyer, a Swiss-born Basel missionary who was captured by the Asante in 1869. The stone church house was built by the early Basel missionaries led by the technical staff member and building technologist, Fritz Ramseyer as well as the missionary-architect, Karl Epting in 1907. Liturgy is conducted in English and the Asante Twi language.

== History ==
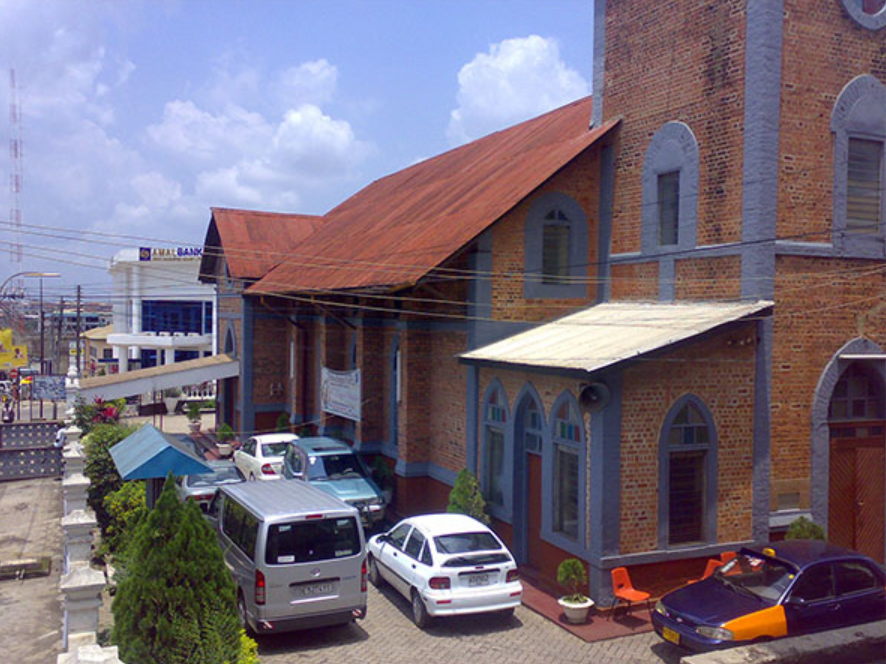
Side view of the chapel

The church's founding can traced to June 1869 when the Basel missionary, the Rev. Fritz Augustus Ramseyer, his wife, Rosa, brother, Johannes and Thomas Owusu, a native Akan Christian convert were captured by the Adubofour-led army of the Asante Kingdom. After half-a-decade of failed negotiations to secure their release, the British colonial authorities invaded Kumasi and freed the four political prisoners. Ramseyer desired to return to Kumasi as a Christian missionary. In 1896, the British colonial authorities invaded Kumasi again and detained the Asantehene, Otumfuo Agyemang Prempeh I, the Queen mother and royal courtiers, taking them as hostages to Elmina on the coast and then to the Seychelles. Shortly thereafter, Fritz Ramseyer returned to Kumasi as a missionary, twenty-two years after his release. Ramseyer purchased land in the suburb of Bantama near the current site of the Komfo Anokye Teaching Hospital with the assistance of Thomas Owusu. After one year, Ramseyer and his team had established two mission stations and two schools. The British military conquest of Kumasi that preceded the founding of the mission station there made the project unpopular among the natives as they viewed the Christian missionaries as colonial agents and Christians as the “religion of the victor”. By 1900, by the end of the last Anglo-Ashanti war led by Yaa Asantewaa, the Queenmother of Ejisu, Ramseyer and the Basel Mission had set up 16 schools in Kumasi with a total enrollment of 311 pupils. Furthermore, 33 baptisms had been recorded and 160 converts lived in the Christian village. Shortly after the end of 1900 war, Fritz and Rosa Ramseyer returned to Europe to recover from post-war trauma. Ramseyer returned to the Gold Coast on 13 December 1901 and led efforts to reorganize the church even though this was opposed by the Basel Mission's Home Committee in Switzerland. The construction of the chapel and minister's conference was in 1907, with communal labour offered by the church's congregation composed of mostly African converts. After the chapel building was completed, it was named the Ebenezer Presbyterian Church. Upon the death of Ramseyer on 6 August 1914, the church leadership under the then moderator, the Rev. C. E. Martinson renamed the church, the Ramseyer Memorial Presbyterian Church in Fritz Ramseyer's memory. In 1938, a healing and prayer fellowship was started at the church in conjunction with congregants from the Assemblies of God.

== Mission ==
The mission of the Ramseyer Memorial Presbyterian Church is based on the Great Commission by Jesus Christ as narrated in Mark 16:15: "Go ye into the world and preach the good news to all creation", which also aligns with the missionary zeal with which the Ramseyers pursued the propagation of the Gospel through evangelism and outreach initiatives.

== Facilities ==
The church has built a new state of the art cathedral with a seating capacity of 3,000. It also owns an 18-unit two-storey primary school block comprising 12 classrooms, an information, communications and technology (ICT) centre, a library, an office and a multi-purpose hall.

== Church hierarchy and groups ==
The church has a district minister and associate ministers. It has many partnerships with non-profits which have resulted in the establishment of schools including the Reginald Latimer Vocational/Senior High School, the Ramseyer Vocational Institute and the Adumasa Link Project. The following are specialized groups within the church:

- Women's Fellowship: The group was started in 1937 by Felicia Afriyie and assisted by Jemima Ampofo, Kra Yaa, Mary Pokuaa, Yaa Sunguro, Elizabeth Santuo Anane and Christiana Bour, who were also the first elected officers. In 1939, the fellowship was formally inaugurated by the Rev. M. A. Obeng, then the Presbytery Chairman, District or Local Minister. The aim of the group was to spearhead the Christian women's ministry in areas relating to Biblical studies, needlework, the crafts, music and evangelism. In the early days, lessons took place at the Basel Mission House in Adum, Kumasi and was led the wives of the Basel missionaries. Today, the fellowship also teaches home science especially cookery, home management, health issues, marriage counselling, financial management and child training. The fellowship has also established a canteen and a nursery school for the church.
- Men's Fellowship: This group was founded on 26 January 1970 by the Rev. F.W.K Akuffo with 25 members and nine executives. Akuffo was the father of Sophia Akuffo, the Chief Justice of the Supreme Court of Ghana. Other founding members were James Owusu (later the Krapahene, a sub-chief), J.M Oppong and J.K. Tawiah. The objective of the fellowship is to mobilise male members of the church to complement the work of the Women's Fellowship. The Men's Fellowship has led efforts in auction initiatives including the periodic “Bring and Buy” and donated a minivan to aid the church in its evangelism work. Seventy percent of male congregants belong to the fellowship.
- Singing Band: The band was founded in 1923 by A. K. Adinkra with support from the then district minister, the Rev. C. E. Martinson.
- Harmonics: The group was founded in 1976 by E. O. Mireku. Originally named the “Special Group Singers”, it was adopted as a formal church group in May 1979, with fifteen members led by G. A. Kuffour. The group has 35 members and an executive committee.
- Young Adult Fellowship (YAF): An initiative of the youth pastors in the Asante Presbytery of the Presbyterian Church of Ghana, the 2005 General Assembly held at the KNUST adopted the Young Adult Fellowship as an official church group. The Implementation Committee was headed by the Rev. Benso Osafo Kantaka, the Director of CLAN. The YAF was officially inaugurated on 2 September 2007. The fellowship organises Bible studies, prayer meetings and other social programs. The group has a membership of 102, managed by a seven-member executive committee.
- Young People's Guild: The YPG was established by A.M. Atkinson under the auspices of the Presbyterian Church of the Gold Coast in 1938. After establishing the first twenty branches, Atkinson arrived in Kumasi in 1941 to start the Kumasi Guild, a predecessor to the YPG with E. K. Hennor, Theodore Oppong and forty-nine pioneers. The YPG had been instrumental in church planting, credited with the opening of about 14 congregations within Kumasi and its environs including the Payer Memorial Presbyterian Church at Bantama. The YPG continues to be active be active in church planting, including new churches at Dominanse and Senfi. The group also organises excursions to tourist sites in the country.
- Ramseyer Choral Singers/Trombone Choir: This group, originally called the “Quints Singers”, was established in the early 1960s. The initially focused on Negro Spirituals. The group became coed and changed its name to the Ramseyer Choral Singers. The founding members were Daniel Fei, P.A. Appiah-Fei, E. Y. Berko, Joseph Ameka, J. Manase Oppong Jnr. And Sam Dankwa. Until 1972, the group was not recognised an official group in the church as the use of drums was banned. The group's performance changed the church leadership at the Kyebi Synod in 1972. The ban on drumming within the church was lifted after that event the Ramseyer Memorial Presbyterian Church adopted the group into its fold. There are fifty members in the group – 22 men and 28 women, overseen by an executive body. In the past, the group has performed at the Ghana National Cultural Centre and Europe - Austria, Switzerland, Germany and Holland. Many members are also in the main church choir.
- Boys’ and Girls’ Brigade: The Brigade was started in 1962 by Yaw Koranteng Oppong. The first enrollment service was on 24 June 1962 and had 9 offices and 105 brigades. It was initially named the 4th and 2nd Kumasi Company of the Boys’ and Girls’ Brigade. The district minister is the chaplain of the group of 50 boys and 60 girls.
- Bible Study and Prayer Group (BSPG): It was founded in the early 1930s by Sunday school teachers. Characterised by its charismatic/neo-Pentecostal approach to evangelism, it was opposed by the elders of the church who considered the practices un-Presbyterian. The group was accepted into the mainstream church after going through a training in Abetifi organised by the Rev. T. A. Kumi between 1962 and 1965. At the 37th Synod of the Presbyterian Church of Ghana, organised at the KNUST on 30 August 1966, the group became an official member of the church through the efforts of the Rev. S. R. Ntifofo. Founding members include Theodore Oppong and E.K. Hennor. The group has been an incubator for future Presbyterian ministers. The group also planted new churches in Ejisu-Asawasi, Besease, Essiemimpong, Feyiase, Akyaw Krom, Stadium Kyiransa and Brofoyedu among others. The group has 105 members -76 females and 29 males.
- Restoration Voices: The group, formed in February 2003, is the Youth Ministry Choir of the Young People's Guild. The group aims to mobilise youth into the formation of song ministration and the training of instrumentalists. There are 45 members – 25 females and 20 males. Restoration Voices was also instrumental in the formation of the youth choir at the Ebenezer Presbyterian Church, Winneba.
- Junior Youth: The group was inaugurated in 1984 at the Regional Conference held at the Ramseyer Church. The group is open to members between the ages of 12 and 18. Total membership stands at 150, with 85 males and 65 males. The executive leadership of the JY organises training programmes for the youth as part of a Christian education.

== See also ==
- Christ Presbyterian Church, Akropong
- Ebenezer Presbyterian Church, Osu
