= Sam Prempeh =

Ghanaian theologian and Presbyterian minister

Sam Prempeh is a Ghanaian theologian and Presbyterian minister who served as the 14th Moderator of the General Assembly of the Presbyterian Church of Ghana (PCG), equivalent to the chief executive officer or managing director of the national church organisation from 1999 to 2003.

== Education ==
Prempeh was educated at the University of Edinburgh, from where received his PhD in 1977, with a thesis title, "The Basel and Bremen Missions in the Gold Coast and Togoland, 1914-1926: A Study in Protestant Missions and the First World War."

== Ministry ==
=== Moderator of PCG ===
In August 1999, Prempeh was elected and declared as the new Moderator of the Presbyterian Church of Ghana to succeed Rt. Rev. A. A. Beeko. He served in this position until 2003. Sam Prempeh was the chairperson of the Ghana Christian Council from 2001 to 2003.
