= Gottlieb Ababio Adom =

Ghanaian educator, minister and journalist

The Reverend Gottlieb Ababio Adom
- Gottlieb Ababio Adom
- Born: 17 November 1904; Accra, Gold Coast
- Died: 20 June 1979 (aged 74); Accra, Ghana
- Education: Scottish Mission Teacher Training College, Akropong
- Occupations: Clergyman; Teacher; Editor; Journalist
- Spouses: Kate Nana Sapon Hyde (m. 1936; ann. 1948); Sophia Esi Atswei Odamtten (m. 1954)
- Children: 6
- Relatives: Emmanuel Obetsebi-Lamptey (step-brother)
- Church: Presbyterian Church of Ghana
- Ordained: Ramseyer Training Centre at Abetifi, 1960
- Offices held: Editor, Christian Messenger; (1966–1970)

Gottlieb Ababio Adom (17 November 1904 – 20 June 1979) was a Ghanaian educator, journalist, editor and Presbyterian minister who served as the Editor of the Christian Messenger from 1966 to 1970. The Christian Messenger, established in 1883 by the Basel Mission, is the primary newspaper of the Presbyterian Church of Ghana.

== Early life and family ==
Gottlieb A. Adom was born on 17 November 1904 in Osu (Christiansborg). His parents were Isaac G. Adom, a blacksmith of Osu-Adjumanko and Elisabeth Ahinee Amarteifio of Osu Amantra, Odartey Sro Weku and of Asere, Accra. Adom's parents both belonged to the Ga people of Accra. Adom hailed from one of the royal families of Osu, Nii Kwei Boadu We of Osu Amanfa - the ruling house of the Osu Stool Linguist, located at Mowule. He was the grandson of Naa Botwe, the Osu Maŋtsɛ Stool Mother (Queen mother) under the Osu paramount chieftaincy. He was named after the award-winning German ethnolinguist and philologist, Johann Gottlieb Christaller who translated the Bible into the Twi language with the help of Akan linguists, David Asante, Theophilus Opoku, Jonathan Palmer Bekoe, and Paul Staudt Keteku. Christaller was a two-time winner (1876; 1882) of the most prestigious linguistics prize, The Prix Volney, awarded since 1822, by the Institut de France "to recognize work in general and comparative linguistics. linguistics." His step-brother was Emmanuel Obetsebi-Lamptey (1902–1963), the politician and lawyer, one of the founding leaders of the United Gold Coast Convention (UGCC) and a member of "The Big Six", the group of political activists detained by the British colonial government after the 1948 Accra riots, kicking off the struggle for the attainment of Ghana's independence in 1957.

== Education and training ==
He attended the Basel Mission primary school at Osu. He enrolled at the middle boarding school, the Osu Salem School, graduating in 1922 with the Middle School Leaving Examination certificate. The Salem School was started in 1843 by three missionaries, Jamaican, Alexander Worthy Clerk and Angolan-born Jamaican Catherine Mulgrave together with the German-trained Americo-Liberian George Peter Thompson. He was admitted for a five-year course in pedagogy and theology at the Scottish Mission Teacher Training College and now Presbyterian College of Education, Akropong, established in 1848 as the second oldest higher educational institution in early modern West Africa after Fourah Bay College which was founded in 1827 in Freetown, Sierra Leone. Adom graduated as a teacher-catechist in 1928. In 1957, the year of Ghana's independence, he took an advanced course in theology and congregational management at the Ramseyer Training Centre at Abetifi, and was ordained a church minister on 19 February 1960. He later received a scholarship for a one-year training in journalism, concentrating in church history and religious reporting. The journalism training was in Kitwe in the then Northern Rhodesia, now Zambia from 1961 to 1962.

== Career ==
=== Teaching ===
He taught in various schools in the Greater Accra and Eastern Regions: Nsawam, Osu, Teshie, Abokobi, Ada and Nungua. He was also the principal of his alma mater, the Osu Salem School from 1955 to 1958 When the Osu Presbyterian Middle Day School was started in 1944, he offered to run it and work for free during the school's first year.

=== Journalism ===
The administration of the Ghanaian Presbyterian Church appointed Adom to be the Editor of the Christian Messenger from 1966 to 1970 for a tenure of about four and a half years. The newspaper established in 1883 by the Basel Mission. as the church's news bulletin, He was a member of the Review Committee which revised the New Testament in Ga and Dangme. He was also a member of the Bible Society of Ghana.

=== Clergy activities ===
As a minister, he pastored Presbyterian congregations at Accra Central, Osu, Kaajano and finally Adabraka (1970–1974) where he retired in August 1974 after 47 years of public service. His ministerial work also took him to Basel, Geneva, Jerusalem, London, Rome and Tel Aviv. In 1969, he was seconded for special service at the All Africa Conference of Churches held in Abidjan, Côte d'Ivoire. He was the Ghanaian representative to the Eleanor Roosevelt Workshop on Human Relations at Rutgers University in New Jersey, USA.

== Personal life ==
Adom was first married to Kate Nana Sapon Hyde (1918–2009), the daughter of a surveyor from Christiansborg, Accra on 17 December 1936 until 1948. On 26 December 1954, he married Sophia Esi Atswei Odamtten (1922–2006) of Ga-Danish ancestry and from La and Osu. Her father, Thomas Odamtten (1877–1961), was an administrative clerk in the Gold Coast customs division at the Takoradi Harbour and later, became one of the Heads of Customs Services in the country. Gottlieb Adom had six children: Harriet (Mrs. Boateng), Edward, George, Victor, Philip and Gloria (Mrs. Clerk).

Odamtten was a schoolteacher and headmistress who co-founded the body, Pastors’ Wives Association (PWA) of the Presbyterian Church of Ghana (now called Presbyterian Ministers’ Wives’ Conference (PMWC)) started in 1970, and was its first Secretary. The association presently has strategic alliances with several sister organisations worldwide. Moreover, Sophia Odamtten was a niece of Charles Odamtten Easmon (1913 –1994), the first formally trained Ghanaian surgeon specialist whose mother, Kate Salome Odamtten and maternal uncle, Solomon Edmund Odamtten, a businessman and political activist, were her paternal grandaunt and granduncle respectively. In addition, her paternal grandfather, Koney Odamete I was of royal lineage and the first and original Kingmaker, locally called the Shikitele of the La Maŋtsɛ Traditional Stool – the paramount chieftaincy of the Ga people of La in Accra. Odamete was also a nineteenth century fishing trawler magnate and general commodities merchant who owned a wooden barrel and distilled beverage business among other commercial activities.

== Death and funeral ==
Adom died of natural causes on 20 June 1979 at the Ridge Hospital in Accra Before his remains were buried in the "Presbyterian clergy quarter (section)" of the Osu Cemetery (formerly known as Christiansborg Civil Cemetery) in Accra, a funeral service was held for him at the Ebenezer Presbyterian Church, Osu.

=== Legacy and memorial ===
During its 2002 chapel building centennial, the Ebenezer Presbyterian Church, Osu, unveiled a commemorative plaque in its sanctuary in memory of Gottlieb Adom and other important citizens of Osu in recognition of their service to the church and education in the country.
