= Presbyterian College of Education, Akropong =

Teacher-training college in Akropong-Akuapem, Ghana

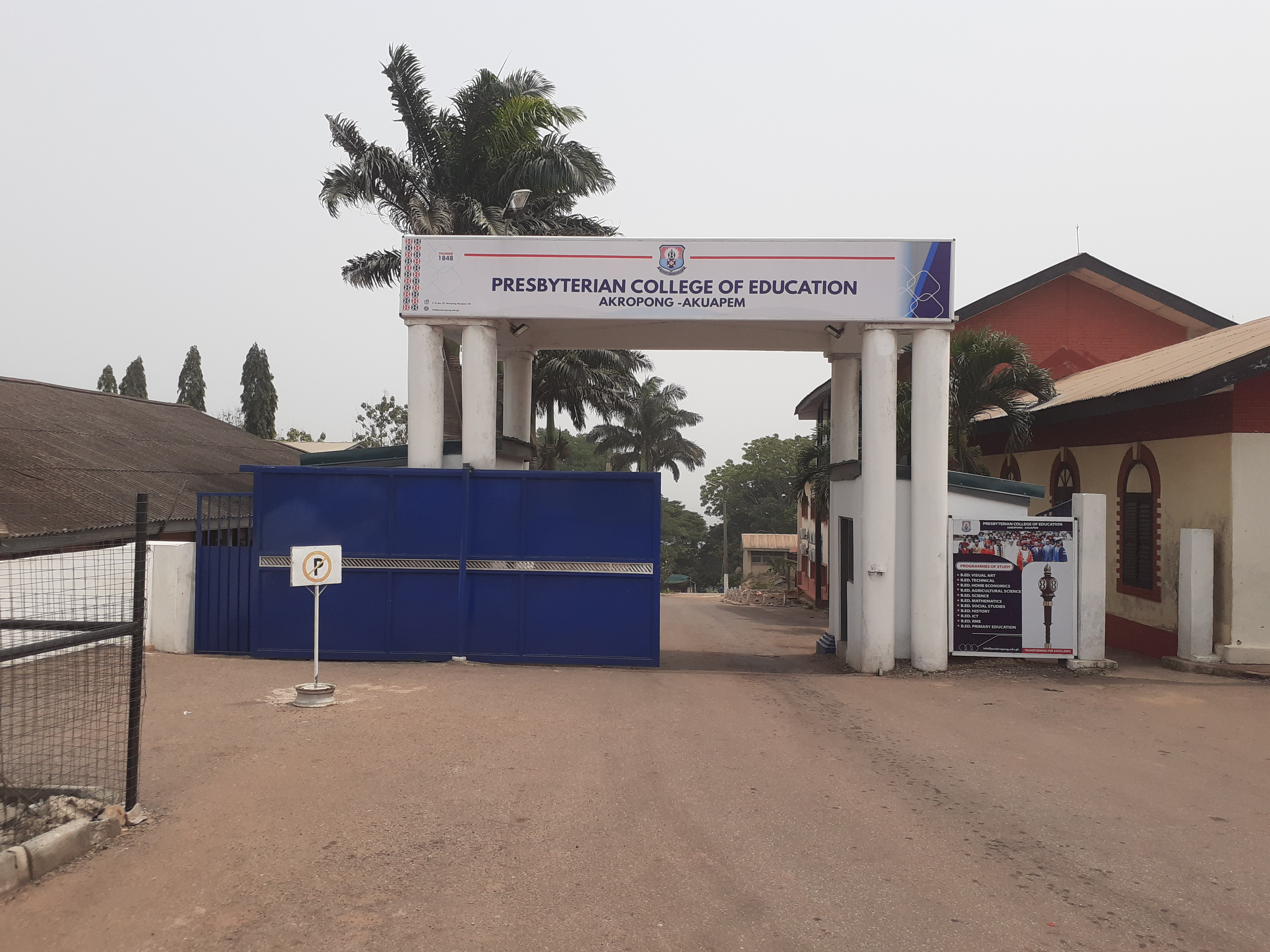

Location
- P. O. Box 27, Akropong-Akuapem; Eastern Region; Akropong, E20004; Ghana; 5.98050°N 0.09046°W

Information
- Former names: Basel Mission Seminary, Akropong; Scottish Mission Teacher Training College; Presbyterian Training College, Akropong
- Type: Co-educational Teacher-training College
- Religious affiliation: Reformed Protestant
- Denomination: Presbyterian
- Established: 3 July 1848; 178 years ago
- Founder: Basel Mission
- School district: Akwapim North Municipality
- Oversight: Ghana Education Service
- Principal: Dr. Nicholas Apreh Siaw
- Campus type: Residential suburban setting

The Presbyterian College of Education, Akropong, is a co-educational teacher-training college in Akropong in the Akwapim North district of the Eastern Region of Ghana. It has gone through a series of previous names, including the Presbyterian Training College, the Scottish Mission Teacher Training College, and the Basel Mission Seminary. The college is accredited by the National Accreditation Board of the Ministry of Education, Ghana as a Degree Research Institution affiliated to the University of Education, Winneba.

== History ==
The first institution of higher education in Ghana, it was founded by the Basel Mission as the Basel Mission Seminary on 3 July 1848 and fondly referred to as the ‘Mother of Our Schools’. The college was the first institution of higher learning to be established to train teacher-catechists for the eventual Presbyterian Church of the Gold Coast. The college is the second oldest higher educational institution in early modern West Africa after Sierra Leone’s Fourah Bay College, founded in 1827. For more than 50 years, it remained the only teacher training institution in the then Gold Coast. It is affiliated to the Presbyterian Church of Ghana. The idea to establish the college was motivated by the ideals of 18th century Württemberg Pietism inspired by German theologians Philipp Spener and August Hermann Francke. The Basel Missionaries who originated mainly from Switzerland and Germany established the college. In the course of the one hundred and sixty years of its existence, the college has run different academic programmes and different curricula have been followed, all tailored to suit the demands of the various times.

These ideals emphasised a combination of spirituality with transformation of life through the practicality of Christian teachings. This feature distinguished the Basel Mission from Anglican and Methodist missionary societies such as the Church Missionary Society, the Society for the Propagation of the Gospel and the Wesleyan Methodist Mission Society which were more doctrinal in their approach to evangelism.

Starting with an enrollment figure of 5 students in 1848, the college now has a student population of 1,268. The Presbyterian College of Education launched its 160th anniversary in July 2008. The college has the tradition of celebrating renowned achievements on milestone occasions: Thousands of highly skilled and exceptionally disciplined educationists have passed out of the college, and have contributed immensely to the development of Ghana not only as teachers, but also as economists, politicians, lawyers, bankers, industrialists, journalists and clergymen. The college contributed to the staffing of the University of Ghana when it was established in 1948. Over eighty percent of the Moderators of the Presbyterian Church of Ghana and the Evangelical Presbyterian Church (including the present E.P. Moderator) were trained at P.T.C.

The first principal of the college was the Basel missionary, the Rev. Johannes Christian Dieterle. A similar teacher-catechist seminary at Christiansborg, started by the German missionary and philologist, Johannes Zimmermann in 1852, was eventually merged into the Akropong college years later in 1856 to become a single entity. In 1864, the Basel missionary and builder, Fritz Ramseyer, who became a captive of the Asante between 1869 and 1874 and pioneered mission work in the Ashanti territories, arrived on the Gold Coast for the first time to assist the mission in its structural work, completing the construction of the seminary buildings at Akropong.

According to the British historian of missions, Andrew Walls, the catechist-teacher education model adopted by the Basel Mission, was an innovation of the Church Missionary Society pioneered by the Anglican vicar, Henry Venn "as a sort of lower, unordained missionary" - "a subaltern role to facilitate the spread of the Gospel." The original curriculum included a five-year course in the methods in pedagogy, education, theology and Christian catechism. In popular culture, the school is dubbed, the Mother of our Schools. It was the only teacher-training college on the Gold Coast for more than half-a-century producing educators for the needs of the community and the Presbyterian Church. The college now offers diplomas and degrees in education, pedagogy and related subjects. The college participated in the DFID-funded Transforming Teacher Education and Learning programme, Ghana (T-TEL) programme. It is one of the about 40 public colleges of education in Ghana.

== Today ==
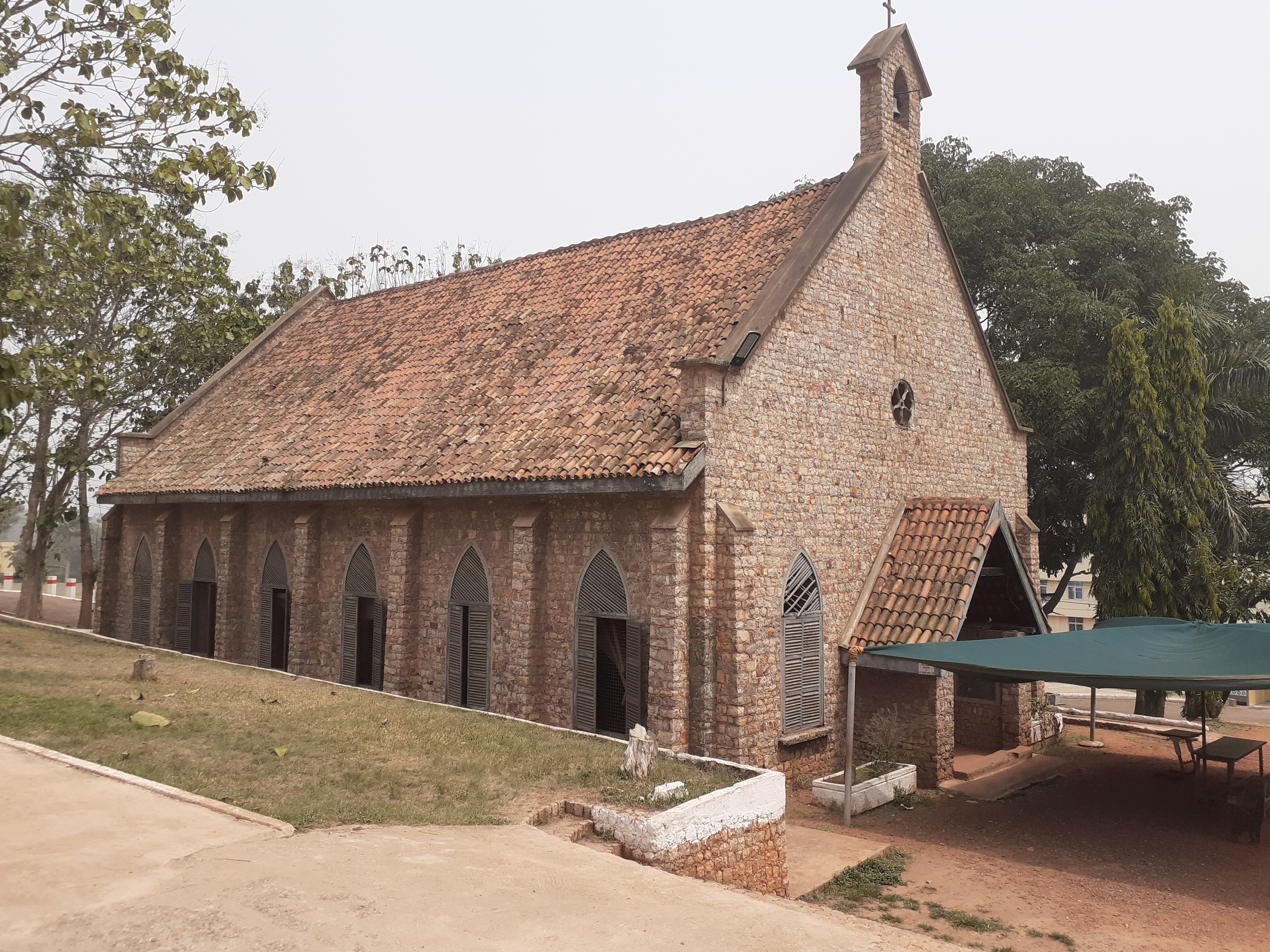
The Centenary Chapel at Presbyterian College of Education Akropong

It is now a fully-fledged public institution with the Ghana Education Service system under the auspices of the Government of Ghana. Initially, the plan was to upgrade the college to a university but that idea was abandoned after the church founded the Presbyterian University College in 1998. It is headed and supervised under the leadership of Rev. Dr. Nicholas Apreh Siaw, who is the current principal of the institution.

The curriculum now includes general education requirements tailored to the demands of a developing country. The school was established five years after the Basel Mission started the country's first primary school in 1843. The Basel Mission, and later the Presbyterian Church of Ghana also led pioneering efforts in establishing hundreds of primary and secondary schools and teacher-training colleges.

== Education ==
The college started with a five-year teacher's certificate course and later run programmes which included the Cert ‘A’ 4-year course, 2-year Cert ‘B’ the 2-year Post ‘B’, 2-year Post-Secondary, 3-year Post Secondary and 2-year Specialist course in Science, Agriculture and Special Education. The college runs a three-year Diploma in Basic Education programme which started in 2004. It is among the fifteen Science designated colleges in the country.

The college is now accredited by the National Accreditation Board of the Ministry of Education, Ghana as a Degree Research Institution affiliated to the University of Education Winneba.

The Presbyterian College of Education has several programmes

=== Accredited Programmes ===
1. Bachelor of Education, Primary Education
2. Bachelor of JHS Education (RME)
3. Bachelor of JHS Education (History)
4. Bachelor of JHS Education (ICT)
5. Bachelor of JHS Education (Agriculture Science)
6. Bachelor of JHS Education (Mathematics)
7. Bachelor of JHS Education (Visual Art)
8. Bachelor of JHS Education (Social Studies)
9. Bachelor of JHS Education (Home Economics)
10. Bachelor of JHS Education (Science)
11. Bachelor of JHS Education (Technical)

== List of Principals ==
No.	Period	Name
1	1848 – 1851	The Rev. Johann Christian Dieterle
2	1852 – 1857	The Rev. Johann Georg Widmann
3	1868 – 1877	The Rev. Johann Adam Mader
4	1878 – 1888	The Rev. Johannes Mueller
5	1889 – 1890	The Rev. David Eisenschmidt
6	1891 – 1905	The Rev. Bahasar Groh
7	1906 – 1909	The Rev. Wilhelm Jakob Rottmann
8	1909 – 1911	The Rev. Immanuel Bellon
9	1912 – 1917	The Rev. Dr. Gustav Jehle
10	1920 – 1926	The Rev. William G. Murray
11	1926 – 1937	The Rev. William Ferguson
12	1937 – 1947	Mr. Douglas Benzies
13	1949 – 1957	The Rev. J. S. Malloch
14	1958 – 1962	The Rev. Dr. J. Noel Smith
15	1963 – 1965	The Rev. E. A. Asamoa
16	1965 – 1971	The Rev. H. T. Dako
17	1971 – 1974	The Rev. L. S. G. Agyemfra
18	1973 – 1978	The Rev. S. K. Aboa
19	1979 – 1987	The Rev. S. A. Ofosuhene
20	1987 – 1993	Mr. Ofori Boahene
21	1994 – 1996	The Rev. K. Agyin-Birikorang
22	1997 – 1999	The Rev. S. K. Mensah
23	1999 – 2010	Mr. Emmanuel Kingsley Osei

== Notable faculty and staff ==
- Ephraim Amu - Ghanaian musicologist, composer and teacher; instructor in music and agriculture
- David Asante - first native Akan missionary of the Basel mission and philologist; instructor in language
- E. A. Boateng - first Vice-Chancellor of the University of Cape Coast; instructor in geography
- Johann Gottlieb Christaller - German missionary and philologist; instructor in language
- Alexander Worthy Clerk - Jamaican Moravian missionary and teacher; instructor in Biblical studies
- Joseph Hanson Kwabena Nketia - Ghanaian composer and ethnomusicologist; instructor in music
- Fritz Ramseyer - Swiss missionary and builder; mission technical staff
- Carl Christian Reindorf - Gold Coast historian and Basel Mission pastor; instructor in history
- Johannes Zimmermann - German missionary and philologist; instructor in language

== Notable alumni ==
- Gottlieb Ababio Adom - Gold Coast educator, journalist, editor and Presbyterian minister
- Kwasi Sintim Aboagye - Ghanaian politician, member of parliament during the first republic.
- Clement Anderson Akrofi - Gold Coast ethnolinguist, translator and philologist who worked extensively on the structure of the Twi language
- Ofori Atta I - Okyenhene or King of Akyem Abuakwa, 1912 – 1943
- Rose Akua Ampofo - Ghanaian educator, gender advocate and first woman in Ghana to be ordained a Presbyterian minister
- Michael Paul Ansah - Ghanaian politician, minister of state in the third republic
- David Asante - first native missionary of the Basel Mission and philologist; instructor in language
- Christian Gonçalves Kwami Baëta - Gold Coast academic and Presbyterian minister and Synod Clerk, Evangelical Presbyterian Church of the Gold Coast, 1945 – 1949, who was instrumental in the establishment of the University of Ghana, Legon in 1948
- Solomon Antwi Kwaku Bonsu - Ghanaian politician, minister of state in the first republic
- Carl Henry Clerk - Gold Coast educator, administrator, journalist, editor and Presbyterian minister, fourth Synod Clerk, Presbyterian Church of the Gold Coast, 1950 – 1954
- Nicholas T. Clerk - Ghanaian academic, administrator and Presbyterian minister
- Nicholas Timothy Clerk - Gold Coast-born Basel missionary and theologian, first Synod Clerk, Presbyterian Church of the Gold Coast, 1918 –1932
- Ferdinand Koblavi Dra Goka - Ghanaian educationist and politician in the First Republic; Volta Regional Minister, 1960 – 1961 and Minister for Finance, 1961 – 1964
- Peter Hall - Gold Coast-born Jamaican educator, clergyman, missionary and first Moderator of the Presbyterian Church of the Gold Coast, 1918 –1922
- Emmanuel Mate Kole - Konor, or paramount chief of the Manya Krobo, 1892–1939.
- Joseph Edward Michel - one of the early commissioned officers in the Ghana Army, Michel Camp was named in his honour.
- Joseph Hanson Kwabena Nketia - Ghanaian composer and ethnomusicologist;
- Richard Emmanuel Obeng (1877–1951), Ghanaian writer; credited for writing one of Africa's earliest and Ghana's first novel titled Eighteenpence.
- E. M. L. Odjidja - ninth Moderator of the Presbyterian Church of Ghana
- Nii Amaa Ollennu - jurist, judge, Justice of the Supreme Court of Ghana, Speaker of the Parliament of Ghana in the Second Republic and acting President of Ghana from 7 August 1970 to 31 August 1970
- Theophilus Opoku - native Akan linguist, translator, philologist, educator and missionary who became the first indigenous African to be ordained a pastor on Gold Coast soil by the Basel Mission in 1872
- Solomon Osei-Akoto - Ghanaian educationist and politician in the Second Republic, Deputy Minister for Transport and Communications, 1969 – 1972
- Emmanuel Charles Quist - barrister, judge and the first African President of the Legislative Council and first Speaker of the Parliament of Ghana
- Edward Akufo-Addo-politician and judge; former Chief Justice in the NLC era and President of Ghana in the second Republic

== See also ==
- Akrofi-Christaller Institute
- Education in Ghana
- Presbyterian Women's College of Education
- Salem School, Osu
- Trinity Theological Seminary, Legon
