= Jane E. Clerk =

Gold Coast educator (1904–1999)

Jane Elizabeth Clerk
- Jane E. Clerk, c. 1940s
- Born: Jane Elizabeth Clerk; 26 May 1904; Adawso, Gold Coast
- Died: 5 July 1999 (aged 95); Accra, Ghana
- Education: Aburi Women’s Teacher Training College; University of London
- Occupations: Schoolteacher; Education administrator
- Known for: Pioneer woman in public education administration in Ghana; Empowerment of women in Ghana
- Parents: Nicholas Timothy Clerk (father); Anna Alice Meyer (mother)
- Relatives: Clerk family; Regina Hesse (grandaunt); Emmanuel Charles Quist (uncle)

Jane Elizabeth Clerk (26 May 1904 – 5 July 1999) was a Gold Coast schoolteacher and a public education administrator. During the colonial era, she was among an early generation of pioneer women educators who eventually became principals of major government schools. In that period, Jane Clerk was the Headmistress of the Government Girls’ Middle School in Kumasi.

== Biography ==
=== Early life and family ===
Jane Elizabeth Clerk was born in Adawso in the Eastern Region on 26 May 1904 to Nicholas Timothy Clerk (1862 –1961) and Anna Alice Meyer (1873 –1934). The seventh of nine children, Jane Clerk was a third generation member of the historically notable Clerk family of Accra. Her father was a Basel missionary, the first Synod Clerk of the Presbyterian Church of the Gold Coast from 1918 to 1932 and a founding father of the boys’ boarding secondary school, the Presbyterian Boys’ Secondary School, established in 1938.^{[8]}^{[9]} Her mother, Anna Alice Meyer, a homemaker and teacher, was of Ga-Danish descent, whose cousin was Emmanuel Charles Quist (1880 – 1959), a barrister and judge who became the first African President of the Legislative Council from 1949 to 1951, Speaker of the National Assembly from 1951 to 1957 and the first Speaker of the National Assembly of Ghana from March 1957 to November 1957. Jane Clerk's paternal grandfather, Alexander Worthy Clerk (1820-1906), a Jamaican Moravian missionary arrived in the Danish Protectorate of Christiansborg (now the suburb of Osu) in Accra, in 1843, as part of the original group of 24 West Indian missionaries who worked under the auspices of the Basel Evangelical Missionary Society of Switzerland. A.W. Clerk was a pioneer of the Presbyterian Church of Ghana and co-founded a middle boarding school for boys, the Salem School in 1843. His paternal grandmother, Pauline Hesse (1831–1909) was from the Gold Coast, and was of Danish, Ga and German ancestry. Her grandaunt was Regina Hesse (1832 –1898), a pioneer educator and school principal.

Her older brother, Carl Henry Clerk (1895 –1982), an editor, agricultural educationist, administrator, journalist and Presbyterian minister served as the fourth Synod Clerk of the Presbyterian Church of the Gold Coast from 1950 to 1954 and the Editor of the Christian Messenger newspaper between 1960 and 1963. Theodore Clerk (1909 – 1965), her younger brother was the first Ghanaian architect who planned and developed the port city of Tema. Her younger sister, Matilda J. Clerk (1916 – 1984) was the second Ghanaian female medical doctor as well as the first woman in Ghana and West Africa to earn a postgraduate diploma.

=== Education and training ===
Jane Clerk had her early education at the Basel Mission primary school at Larteh Akuapem where her father was stationed as the district minister for that presbytery. She proceeded to an all-girls’ boarding school at Aburi, a town her grandfather had lived in. She attended the Aburi Women's Teacher Training College (now the Presbyterian Women's College of Education) where she studied pedagogy and was one of two students in the school's first batch in 1928. In 1946, Jane Clerk was among a select group of senior teachers who were awarded mid-career scholarships for further professional training abroad at the University of London's Institute of Education which today forms part of the University College London, where she earned an Associate Certificate in Education on completion of the eighteen-month course.

=== Career ===
Jane Clerk taught at various schools at Aburi and Agogo during her early career. She was transferred to Kumasi and appointed the Headmistress of the Government Girls’ School. She was later elevated to the position of assistant education officer in 1947. In 1952, she became an education officer for the city of Koforidua where her roles and responsibilities included general supervision and inspection of schools, a man's domain at the time. She retired from her teaching career in 1959.

== Death ==
She died of natural causes in 1999 in Osu, Accra at the age of ninety-five. Her remains were interred at the Osu Cemetery in Accra.
