= Christaller =

Christaller is a surname. Notable people with the surname include:

- Helene Christaller (1872–1953), German writer
- Emilie Christaller (1829–1866), German missionary and educator
- Johann Gottlieb Christaller (1827–1895), German missionary and linguist
- Walter Christaller, German geographer
