= Emilie Christaller =

German educator and missionary

Christiane Emilie Christaller
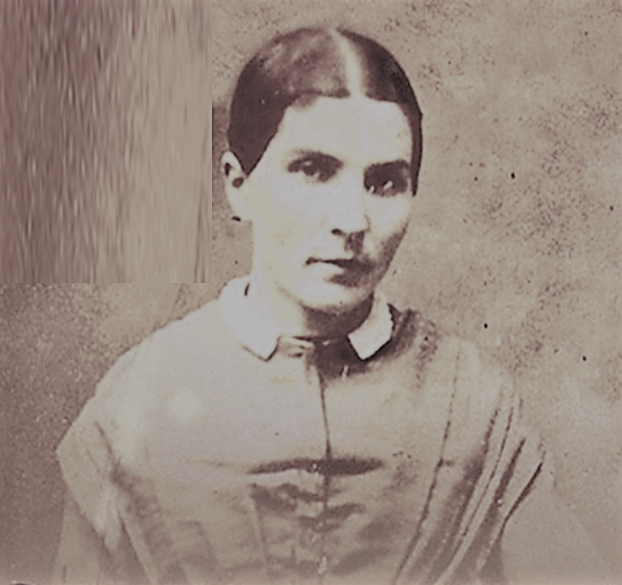
- Emilie Christaller
- Born: Christiane Emilie Ziegler; 1829; Waiblingen, Kingdom of Württemberg
- Died: 13 August 1866 (aged 36–37); Kyebi, Gold Coast
- Occupations: Educator; Missionary
- Known for: Women's vocational education on the Gold Coast
- Spouse: Johann Gottlieb Christaller (m. 1857)
- Children: 5
- Parents: Christian Ludwig Ziegler (father); Rosine Kübler (mother)

Christiane Emilie Christaller, née Ziegler, (1829 – 13 August 1866) was a German educator and missionary in Akropong in colonial Ghana. She was the first wife of Johann Gottlieb Christaller (1827–1895), a German missionary, linguist and philologist of the Basel Mission, notable for his leading role in the translation of the entire Holy Bible into the Twi language.

== Early life and education ==
Christiane Emilie Ziegler was born in 1829 in the town of Waiblingen near Stuttgart in the then Kingdom of Württemberg, in the now southwest German state of Baden-Württemberg. Her parents were Christian Ludwig Ziegler and Rosine Kübler, who were described as non-church-going Christians who always prayed at the table. Emilie Ziegler had seven siblings including Pauline (Frau Haefner), Marie (Frau Pfleiderer) and Bertha Ziegler who eventually married J.G. Christaller in 1872 after her sister's death in 1866. Emilie Ziegler's parents permitted her to go to church, in the company of her close friend, Edith, who was the only child of her family. She experienced her first spiritual awakening when she heard a sermon by a Pietist Lutheran missionary who recounted stories about children in Africa who had no access to education and had never heard about the Gospel of Jesus Christ. Emilie Ziegler wished she did not have to go to school too but the preacher's words influenced her decision to become a missionary.

In January 1850, Ziegler moved to Basel, Switzerland to become an au pair in the household of a widower, Inspector Hoffman of the Basel Mission. Though she enjoyed her new role in childcare, she was uncomfortable in the Hoffman household because she found its members "too pious for her liking". After a few months, her employers moved to a different European city and Ziegler left Basel. She was then sent to Stuttgart to stay with her ageing grandaunt. In her diaries, she described this period as a "difficult time...as her prayers came back to her unanswered and her family failed to understand feelings". The family viewed her as a useful helper to her elderly grandaunt. She befriended a cobbler in the vicinity, who introduced her to a Christian fellowship. She enjoyed the company of her new friends. Not long after, her grandaunt passed away and Emilie Ziegler was employed as a storekeeper in Stuttgart.

== Marriage proposal, voyage and marriage ==
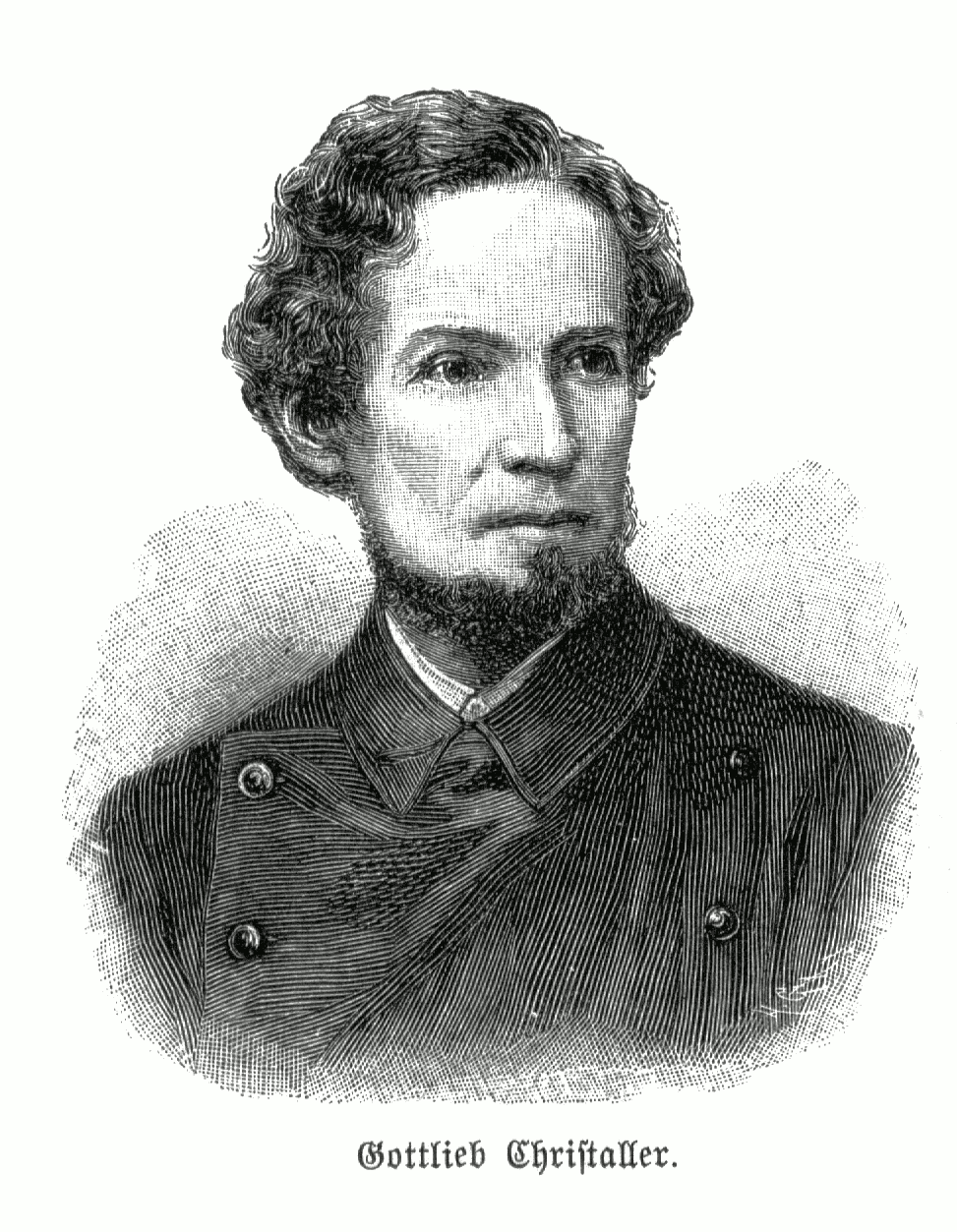
Johann Gottlieb Christaller

In 1856, Emilie Ziegler received a marriage proposal from a twenty-nine-year-old German missionary, Johann Gottlieb Christaller who had been working as a philologist at Akropong on the Gold Coast for about three years. Christaller was born in Winnenden in Baden Württemberg. Christaller translated the Bible into the Twi language, with the assistance of the Akan linguists, David Asante, Theophilus Opoku, Jonathan Palmer Bekoe and Paul Keteku. Christaller also served as the first editor of the mission's newspaper, Christian Messenger from its founding in 1883 to 1895. The Basel Mission required its missionaries to prove themselves in the field for a minimum of two years before the Home Committee could grant the permission to find a spouse. The marriage request was made through Christaller's sister and the Basel Mission's Inspector Josenhans, with whom Ziegler had stayed with in Basel. A delegation consisting of J. G. Christaller, his sister and one Gustave Rapp went to Stuttgart to ask for Emilie Ziegler's hand in marriage. Per her own account, she fell in love with Christaller at first sight.

In November 1856, Emilie Ziegler left her hometown, Waiblingen for Basel, from where she would begin the trip to the Gold Coast. She boarded a London-bound train from Basel. There was a storm at the start of the journey, described as "hellish chaos" and Emilie Ziegler feared the worst. Sensing her worry, a passenger aboard the sailing ship told her, "There is always help, if not here, then in another world". She desired to live and did not want to perish at sea. After several days at sea, the sailors managed to return to safety at the harbour in London. C. E. Ziegler viewed this voyage as her "freedom interval". In retrospect, this short stormy period prepared her for the tribulation she would face in the mission field on the Gold Coast.

When ship arrived in Sierra Leone, there was a letter from her fiancé, Johann Christaller, addressed to "Germans coming to Africa". She was impressed with his beautiful handwriting. However, she had reservations about the general tone of the letter. Emelie Ziegler finally arrived in Christiansborg (Osu) in Accra, Gold Coast on 22 December 1856 where she was met a Basel missionary, Christoph Wilhelm Löcher, who told her, her husband-to-be would meet her later. She also noticed that Osu was in ruins from the 1854 bombardment of town by the British colonial authorities after the indigenes refused to pay the unpopular poll tax.

On 27 January 1857, when Christiane Emilie Ziegler was 27 years old, she married Johann Gottlieb Christaller. The wedding ceremony was at Akropong.

== Life on the Gold Coast ==
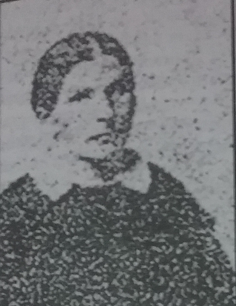
Christiane Emilie Ziegler

Emilie's Christaller's life on the Gold Coast was captured in a book, "Die mit Tränen säen. Das Leben der Missionarsfrau Emilie Christaller" ("Those who sow tears: The life of missionary-wife Emilie Christaller") authored by her great-granddaughter-in-law, Eva Nöldeke and inspired by the Psalmist per the biblical Psalm 126:5. The book's content was sourced from her diaries and letters of correspondence written by her as well as those by her husband.

Emelie Christaller found it difficult to acclimatise to her new environment. She was afraid of insects and started drinking her coffee without sugar to avoid ants in her house. She found it difficult to learn the Twi vernacular and her husband, a linguist, told her he was too busy to teach her the language. She found J. G. Christaller to be detached. He was preoccupied with his linguistic work and rarely spent time with her, apart from sharing meals and having evening strolls together. When she voiced any concerns, her husband's response was always to ask her to pray. She learnt to keep her worries to herself and lacked a sense of belonging at Akropong.

She wrote letters to her parents when she was homesick. Her parents' response always came after two months, due to the spotty correspondence between West Africa and Europe. She viewed the Basel missionaries at Akropong as having no rights within the rigid mission quarter. She sensed that the English Governor preferred the Wesleyan missionaries to the Basel mission, who he merely tolerated.

Together with another missionary-wife, Frau Mader, Emilie Christaller started supervising and teaching at the sewing school. Even though the two women got along very well, she noticed that there were tensions and unhealthy rivalry between their spouses. Her husband remained aloof and refused to answer questions relating to her health, language or even her teaching duties at the school. Some of her requests were met with an order from J. G. Christaller, "Do as I say!” She felt unloved and effectively lost interest in him. Nonetheless, when she went on an assignment at Abokobi, she began to miss him and realised that despite all their relationship troubles, differing levels of faith and outlooks in life, she still loved him.

She was once critically ill with shivering and chills. At night, she could hear her husband and Frau Mader praying feverishly for her while another person, broke into song. She felt much better in the morning. Shortly thereafter, she became pregnant for the first time. As her delivery date approached, she became apprehensive. She asked the local Akropong women what they did during childbirth and they explained the process using hand gestures. As she was returning to her home, she met a local shaman who had healed her. Emilie Christaller looked at and expressed her appreciation without uttering a word. The healer predicted wrongly that the baby would be a girl. Emilie Christaller felt elated but could not tell her husband because she feared his reaction, knowing that he would disapprove her interactions with a fetish priest.

In the last months of her first pregnancy, she found it frustrating that her husband's constant response to every problem was "Go on your knees and pray!” Her belief in faith healing was not as strong as her husband's and sometimes, she just wanted a companion in her husband with whom she could share her fears and worries. She felt more comfortable discussing her problem with the Rev. Meadows, an English Wesleyan missionary she had met at Bathurst, England en route to the Gold Coast. Johann Christaller, surprisingly wrote loving letters to his wife anytime he travelled outside Akropong, which was in contrast his attitude towards her at home.

== Return to Europe ==
Their first child, Erdmann Gottreich Christaller was born on 10 December 1857 at Akropong after which they sailed to Europe for furlough. The voyage to Europe was a difficult one, during which the 25-year-old ship captain died. During the stormy journey, her husband prayed incessantly while her own source of comfort was her baby son's grin. The ship eventually docked at Bristol on 19 May 1858. They connected to Basel by train with a transit in London.

Overall the Christaller couple had five children in all, four sons and a daughter, including Erdmann Gottreich Christaller, a Protestant pastor and writer, Theodor Benjamin Christaller, "Empire" school teacher in Cameroon and Hanna Martha Christaller, who wrote "Kolonial novellen (Togo)". The remaining two children were Paul and Ernest Christaller.

On the journey to Europe, Emelie Christaller took along a girl called Anyama, an Akan native and former domestic slave whose freedom the Basel mission had bought from her enslavers. Anyama quickly became homesick and sad. This situation also worried Emelie Christaller as it was her idea to bring Anyama to Europe. While they were in transit in London, she disappeared and was found chatting with a sailor, perhaps asking for directions back to the Gold Coast. Johann Christaller was livid over Anyama's disappearance. When she was eventually found, Emelie Christaller discounted the role of divine providence. Instead, she insisted they thank their hosts, the Waring family. The cordial relationship between Anyama and Emelie Christaller deteriorated after this episode.

Furthermore, the Basel Mission's Home Committee's disapproved of any idea to have Anyama stay in Europe. Emelie Christaller privately questioned the Christian values and beliefs of the leaders in Basel who refused to accept an outsider into their community. In her hometown, Waiblingen, the Ziegler family also refused to host Anyama. As a result of the hostile atmosphere, Emelie Christaller realised that it was in Anyama's own interest to return to the Gold Coast. As such, she sailed to West Africa, unaccompanied by any adult from the Basel mission.

In 1861, the Christaller family moved from Basel to J.G. Christaller's hometown, Winnenden. A year later in 1862, Johann Christaller returned to the Gold Coast while his wife, Emelie and the children moved back to her parents' home in Waiblingen. In 1863, Emilie Ziegler returned to the Gold Coast. Three of her children, 6-year-old Gottreich, 4-year-old Martha and 3-year-old Paul were sent to Basel to live in the boarding house for the children of missionaries. Her 2-year-old son, Ernest, remained with her parents in Waiblingen while her 9-month-old baby was cared for by her mother-in-law in Winnenden.

== Final years and death ==
Upon her return to the Gold Coast, she encountered a noticeable change in her husband's attitude. He became more understanding and caring. He made time to have conversations with her about her welfare and health. He also discussed his linguistic abstracts and work in general with her. This time, they lived in Aburi. In 1865, they relocated again to Kyebi. Christiane Emilie Christaller died on 13 August 1866, aged 37, at Kyebi in Akyem Abuakwa. She never saw her children again. Her remains were buried under a palm tree at the old Basel Mission cemetery in Kyebi. After her death, J. G. Christaller married her sister, Bertha Ziegler in 1872. They also had a daughter and four sons.

== Literature ==
- Nöldeke, Eva (2002) "Die mit Tränen säen. Das Leben der Missionarsfrau Emilie Christaller" Biographischer Roman – Buch gebraucht kaufen [Those who sow tears: The life of missionary-wife Emilie Christaller]
