= Presbyterian Women's College of Education =

Women's college in Aburi, Ghana

- Eastern Region; Aburi; Ghana

Information
- Former name: Aburi Women’s Teacher Training College
- School type: Women's College of Education
- Founded: 1928; 98 years ago
- School district: Akwapim South
- Oversight: Ministry of Education
- Principal: Cynthia Anim
- Classes offered: Technical Science; General Science; General Arts; Visual Arts; Business Accounting; Agricultural Science
- Language: English

Presbyterian Women's College of Education formerly Aburi Women's Teacher Training College is an all-female college of education in Aburi, Eastern Region (Ghana). The college was established by the Basel missionaries in 1928. The school's first principal was Ms. Elsie McKillican. The school started with two pioneer students.

The college participated in the DFID-funded Transforming Teacher Education and Learning programme.

== History ==
Presbyterian Women's College of Education at Aburi was established by the Basel Missionaries in 1928. The first principal of the college was Ms Elsie McKillican. The Basel Evangelical Missionary Society established the Presbyterian Women's Training College at Aburi. The expansion of economic opportunities through the education of women on the Gold Coast was central to the society's mission besides the propagation of the Gospel. For each male-only school, the Basel Mission set up, it established a female counterpart as well. In 1858, a primary school – the first all-girls’ boarding school – was started by the Basel missionaries. Several of the pupils were drawn from the Abokobi, Aburi, Akropong, Odumase and Osu mission stations. A middle school department was added to the institution in 1916 so girls could complete their education at Standard Seven.

At the onset of World War I in 1914, the Basel mission was expelled from the Gold Coast by the British colonial government as many missionaries were German-speaking citizens of Germany and Switzerland. The colonial administration viewed them as “alien security risks”. Presbyterian missionaries of the Free Church of Scotland who were then based in Calabar, Nigeria replaced the Basel missionary activities including running of its schools on the Gold Coast. In 1920, three British teachers Miss Wallace, Miss Efie Sutherland and Miss Agnes Gray were posted to Aburi in 1920.

The British educator, Miss E. H. Mackillican replaced Miss Agnes Gray who was relocating to Calabar to take over a school there. In that same year, a class on pedagogy or teaching methods was introduced, forming the basis for the formation of a women's normal school. In 1925, a kindergarten - the first in the country, was added to the school by Miss C. P. Moir. Miss E. M. Beveridge, author of “Kan Me Hwe” series of readers for schools in the Akan areas of Ghana and Miss Ophelia Som were put in charge of running the kindergarten.

In 1928, the British colonial government ratified the founding of the women's teacher training college at Aburi. There were two pioneer students, including the public education administrator, Jane E. Clerk in the first batch in 1928. The two-year curriculum was designed to train women teacher trainees in the methods of teaching. Following this development, the Education Committee of the Presbyterian Church of the Gold Coast in collaboration of the Basel and Scottish missionaries explored the possibility of a girls’ grammar high school on the Aburi campus of the teachers’ college. The secondary school started in 1946 sharing classes with the teacher training department. In 1948, the middle school was moved to a different site and was operated under the auspices of the church with local staff who were trained at the women's college.

On 10 December 1953, the secondary and teacher training college moved to new premises. The school at the time had 76 high school and 60 teacher training college students. The secondary school was moved again to its permanent site on 11 December 1954. On 1 February 1954, the first batch of local teachers for the college was transferred from Agogo. The first African principal was Gladys Adum Kwapong whose tenure of office was from 1963 to 1980. The college's traditions therefore has elements from the Basel, Scottish and indigenous African periods.

In 1961, male students were admitted for the first time in the college's history followed by 30 more men in 1962. The attempt to convert the college into a co-educational institution failed due to limited infrastructure and the high level of indiscipline the college experienced when it became co-educational, men were no longer admitted after 1964.

Over the years, the school has run craft specialist, ordinary and post-secondary teacher training courses.

=== Programmes ===
The college started with 2-year Teacher's Certificate ‘B’ course, and has gone through the following programmes since then:

- 4-year Post Middle Teacher's Certificate ‘A’
- 2-year Post ‘B’ Teacher's Certificate ‘A’
- 2-year Post Secondary Teacher's Certificate's ‘A’
- 3-year Post Secondary Teacher's Certificate ‘A’
- 3-year Diploma in Basic Education

== Principals ==
The following individuals have served as principal of the college:

Name	Tenure of office
Mrs. E. H. Mackillican	1928–53
Mrs. Getrude Juzi	1954–63
Ms. Gladys Kwapong	1963–80
Mrs. Beatrice Osafo Affum	1980–91
Mrs. Henrietta Offei-Awuku	1991–99
Mrs. Charity Asare	1999–00
Mrs. Rose Oduro-Koranteng	2001–09
Ms. Grace Manubea Ansah	2009–12
Dr. Harriet Naki Amui	2012–19
Mrs Cynthia Anim	2019-date

== Notable alumnae ==
- Jane E. Clerk, first student of the college, teacher and pioneer woman education administrator on the Gold Coast

== See also ==
- Akrofi-Christaller Institute
- Education in Ghana
- Presbyterian College of Education, Akropong
- Salem School, Osu
- Trinity Theological Seminary, Legon
