= Clement Anderson Akrofi =

Ghanaian philologist

- Born: 1 July 1901; Apirede Gold Coast
- Died: 1 July 1967 (aged 66)
- Education: Scottish Mission Teacher Training College, Akropong
- Occupations: Philologist; Ethnolinguist; Translator
- Writing career
- Language: English; Twi language

Clement Anderson Akrofi (1 July 1901 – 1 July 1967) was an ethnolinguist, translator and philologist who worked extensively on the structure of the Twi language under the aegis of the Presbyterian Church of Ghana.

== Early life and education ==
Clement Anderson Akrofi was born in Apirede in the Akuapem area of the Eastern Region of Ghana. He belonged to the Guan ethnic group and thus, Twi was not his native language. In 1873, his parents, Andreas Kwaku Adu and Rosina Akosua Twewa, who were subsistence farmers, were among the first batch of congregants to join the then newly established Basel Mission Church in Apirede. Akrofi was afflicted by poliomyelitis which led to infantile paralysis and the loss of lower limb movement. He used a wheelchair for his entire life. As a child, he was influenced by the Pietist movement of the Basel missionaries and became actively involved in church activities.

Akrofi had his primary school education at Apirede followed his middle school education at Akropong. He was then admitted to the Scottish Mission Teacher Training College (Basel Mission Seminary) and trained as a teacher-catechist. During this time, his life philosophy was shaped by the educational ideas Presbyterian Scottish missionaries who replaced the Basel missionaries after their expulsion, as “alien security risk”, by the British colonial government at the beginning of World War I. As many Basel missionaries were either of German or Swiss German origins, the colonial government saw them as political appendages of the German government.

== Literary work ==
During his studies at the Akropong seminary, Akrofi came to believe that the intensive study of the Twi language was the most effective way to enhance Christian mission work in the Akan regions of the Gold Coast. His magnum opus, “Twi Kasa Mmara: A Twi Grammar in Twi” was published in 1937 with a foreword written by the Basel missionary, Dietrich Westermann who described Akrofi's work as “an African language being interpreted by an African Scholar writing in his own language.”

In 1961, during festivities marking her state visit of Queen Elizabeth II, he was introduced by Ghana's first leader, Kwame Nkrumah as the “Chaucer of our language.” He also revised the Twi Bible using contemporaneous grammar of the 20th century and building upon the 19th century work of the Basel missionary and philologist, Johann Gottlieb Christaller. Some scholars regard Akrofi as the heir to Christaller.

== Awards ==
He was awarded an honorary doctoral degree in theology (Doctor Honoris Causa) by the Johannes Gutenberg University in Mainz, Germany “for his contributions towards the development of the Twi language and the advancement of Christian literature.”

In his acceptance speech, he remarked:

“I do not forget that I am receiving this honour primarily as a servant of the Gospel. In view of the general tendency to regard Christianity as a foreign religion, I will remind my fellow Africans that although Christianity is Europe’s greatest gift to Africa, it is not exclusively the white man’s religion; it is not the religion of the imperialist, Christianity is a world religion because Jesus Christ is the Lord and King of the Universe.”.

Akrofi's address therefore echoed sentiments in some academic circles that Christianity has been in Africa since the days of the early Christian church. Thus, the religion was not to be perceived as a cultural import.

== Selected works ==
Clement Akrofi's published works include:

- Akrofi, C. A. (1937) “Twi Kasa Mmara: A Twi Grammar in Twi”
- Akrofi, C. A., Rapp, E. L. (1938) “Twi Spelling Book”
- Akrofi, C. A., Botchwey, G. L. (1968) “English-Twi-Ga Dictionary”
- Akrofi, C. A. “Twi Bible (revised)”
- Akrofi, C. A. “Twi Dictionary”
- Akrofi, C. A., “Twi Mmebusem, collection of 1018 Twi proverbs”

== Death and legacy ==
Clement Anderson Akrofi died in 1967.

Akrofi's contribution to the reading of the vernacular in written form rather than orally and translating Christian literary works is seen as greatest achievement in the development of the indigenous African Church as well as the teaching of Twi as a subject in the Ghanaian educational curriculum. This fits into the wider Basel Mission legacy of linguistic development to allow African Christians read the Bible in their own native languages.

=== Akrofi-Christaller Institute ===
The Akrofi-Christaller Institute is a postgraduate research and training Institute located at Akropong which awards its own degrees. It promotes "the study and documentation of Christian history, thought and life in Ghana and in Africa as a whole, in relation to their African setting and to world Christianity" within the context of missiology and vernacular development. It was named after Clement Anderson Akrofi and Johann Gottlieb Christaller. Though institutionally independent, the institute is an affiliate of the Presbyterian Church of Ghana and is housed in an old Basel Mission station.
