= Battle of Ordashu =

Battle of the Third Anglo-Ashanti War

- Part of Third Anglo-Ashanti War
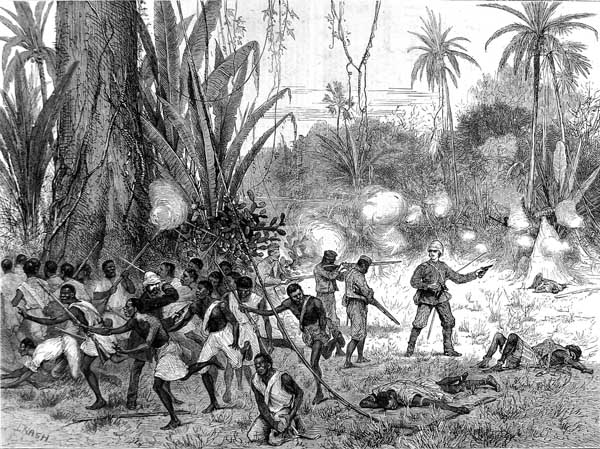
- A bush fight, Third Anglo-Ashanti War. The Graphic 1874
Date	4 February 1874
Location	West Africa 6.6340°N 1.5640°W
Result	British victory

Belligerents
United Kingdom (Ghana) Akyem Abuakwa	Ashanti Empire

Commanders and leaders
(United Kingdom) Sir Garnet Wolseley; King Atta	Unknown

Strength
2,500 troops	Unknown

Casualties and losses
Unknown	Unknown

The Battle of Ordashu was fought on 4 February 1874 during the Third Anglo-Ashanti War when Sir Garnet Wolseley defeated the Ashantis. The attack was led by the 42nd Regiment of Foot. Lieutenant Mark Sever Bell won the Victoria Cross during the action.

Wolseley's troops, marching from Amoaful, linked up with King Attah's group, marching from Kumasi, on the south bank of the River Oda (a tributary of the Ofin River), where the battle with the Ashantis took place.
