= Akrofi =

Akrofi is an Akan language surname. Notable people with the surname include:

- Clement Anderson Akrofi, philologist, ethnolinguist and translator who worked on the structure of the Twi language
- Justice Akrofi (born 1942), Ghanaian Anglican archbishop
