= Akrofi-Christaller Institute =

Postgraduate research institute

Akrofi-Christaller Institute of Theology, Mission and Culture

Location
- P.O. Box 76, Akropong-Akuapem; Eastern Region; Ghana; 5.972972661856299°N 0.0857689388813296°W

Information
- Type: Postgraduate research institute
- Religious affiliation: Reformed Protestant
- Denomination: Presbyterian
- Established: 1987; 39 years ago
- Founder: Presbyterian Church of Ghana
- School district: Akwapim North Municipality
- Oversight: Ghana Education Service
- Principal: The Rev. Dr. Benhardt Y. Quarshie
- Campus type: Residential suburban setting
- Website: https://www.aci.edu.gh/

The Akrofi-Christaller Institute of Theology, Mission and Culture (ACI), formerly known as the Akrofi-Christaller Memorial Centre for Mission Research and Applied Theology, is a tertiary, postgraduate research and training institute located in Akropong-Akuapem in Ghana. The institute was set up to study and document Christian religious thought, history and theology through the lens of culture, historiography and life in Ghanaian society and Africa as well as scholarship on ecumenical relations between the continent and the rest of the world.

== History ==
Akrofi-Christaller institute was founded in 1987 as an independent, self-financing entity, a company limited by guarantee and registered under the Companies Code as a non-profit educational institution. It is fully accredited by the National Accreditation Board of Ghana's Ministry of Education, with a full Presidential Charter to award its own degrees.

The university was named after two Christian ethnologists, Johann Gottlieb Christaller and Clement Anderson Akrofi who carried out extensive literary work on the Twi language. With roots in the Pietistic tradition of the Basel Mission, the Institute combines academic study with propagation of the Gospel in Ghana and Africa.

Akrofi-Christaller Institute occupies the buildings of the historic Akropong Seminary including the Basel House in Akropong-Akuapem, a campus that was built in the mid-nineteenth century, renovated in the early nineties and expanded by the turn of the millennium. The upgrade of the facilities include residential and dining buildings, a specialist reference library - the Johannes Zimmermann Library and lecture halls.

== Notable alumni ==
- Kwabena Opuni Frimpong - former General Secretary, Christian Council of Ghana

== See also ==
- Education in Ghana
- Presbyterian College of Education, Akropong
- Presbyterian Women's College of Education
- Salem School, Osu
- Trinity Theological Seminary, Legon
