= Richard Emmanuel Obeng =

Richrd Emmanuel Obeng (1877 – 1951) was a Ghanaian Basel Catechist and teacher. He is credited for writing one of Africa's earliest and Ghana's first novel titled Eighteenpence. The novel was published in 1942.

Obeng was born in the 1870s (likely 14 October 1877, due to events that happened at the time) in Abetifi Kwahu, then under the oversight of the then Ashanti Colony. His parents were Maria Akua (Kuru) Animwa and Daniel Kwadwo (Donkor) Asare of Akropong. Obeng had his primary education in Abetifi prior to entering the Akropong Training College (now the Presbyterian College of Education, Akropong) to train as a teacher. His fees were funded by the Basel missionary Fritz Ramseyer. He began teaching in 1898 until 1910 when he resigned as a teacher, to take up appointment as a "C" Company pay clerk with the Gold Coast Regiment. He was later appointed as an assistant headmaster of a school in Kumasi. He was transferred to Juaso in Ashanti Akim, where he founded a school; the Juaso Government Boys' School. He was headmaster there from 1922 until his retirement in 1937. He became first person from the Gold Coast to receive the colony's Certificate of Honour and Badge in 1938.

Obeng started writing after his retirement. His novel Eighteenpence was published in 1942 and re-issued in 1950 and 1971. He financed the publication, with his pension salary and wealth he inherited from his mother. The publication remains his only book published in the English language. In the book, Obeng highlights the antagonism between the two political systems that pertained in the Gold Coast at the time; the traditional matrilineal system of chieftaincy and the British patriarchal system which was superimposed on the Gold Coast. The book is also of ethnographic interest as it describes into detail the traditional court hearings. Obeng could be described as a traditionalist who abhorred the imposition os British rule and favoured the traditional system, while acknowledging its limitations. Obeng also wrote text books in Geography and History in the Twi language.

Obeng died in 1951.
