= Eugen Liebendörfer =

German missionary doctor to India

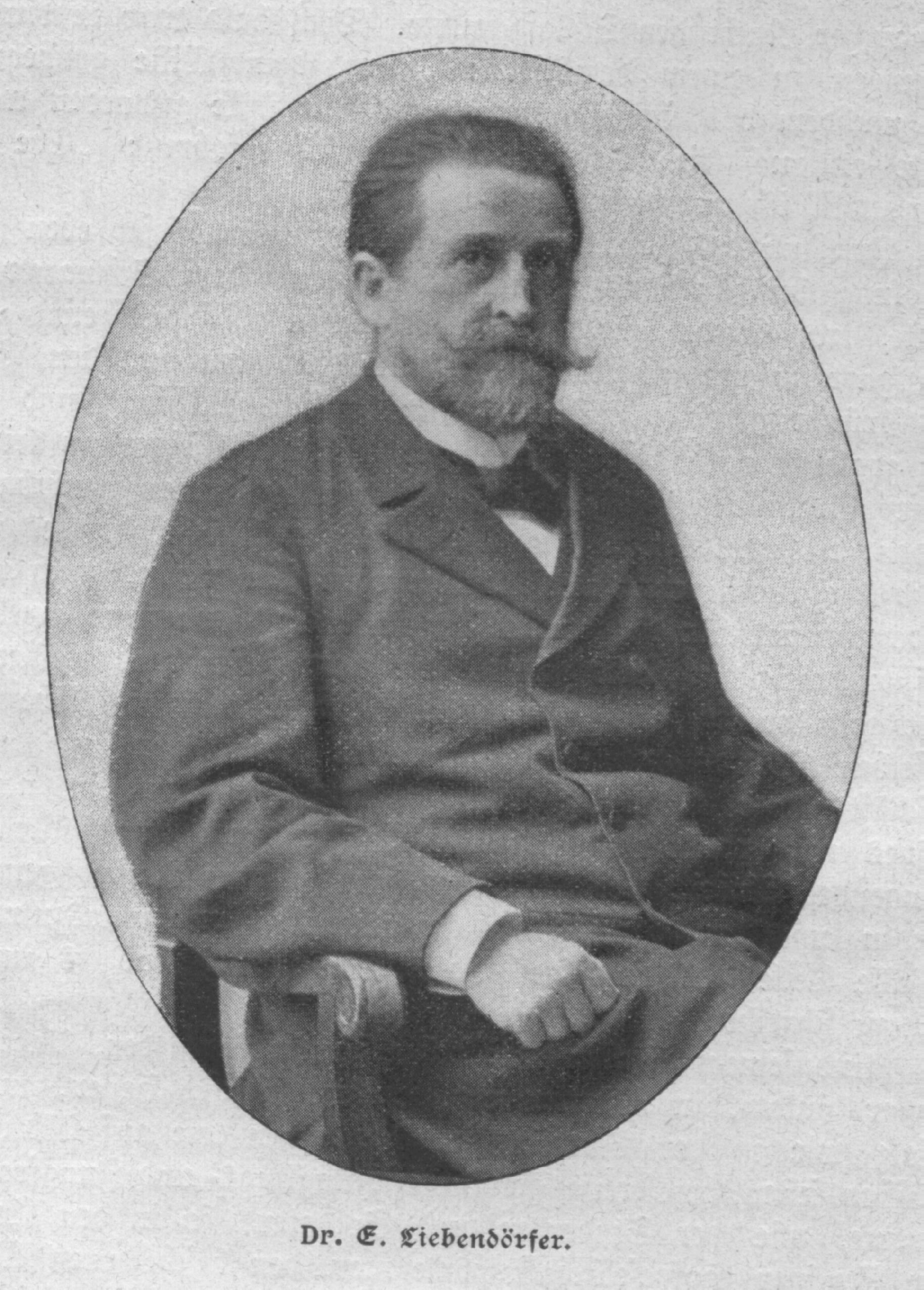
Portrait of Dr Eugen Liebendörfer (dated 1895) (from the Liebendörfer family archives)

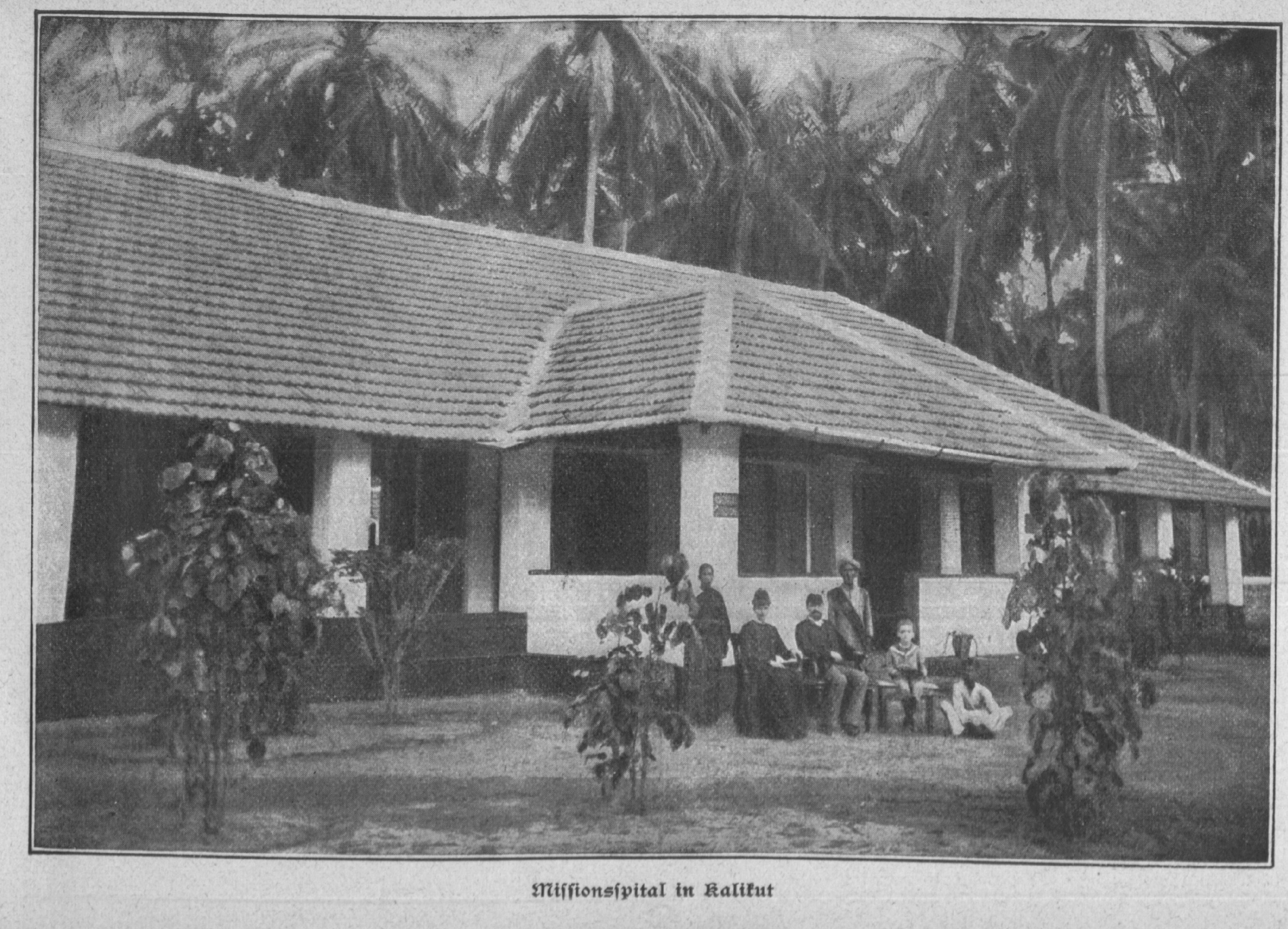
Mission Hospital at Kozhikode (Calicut) founded by Dr Eugen Liebendörfer in 1895 (from the Liebendörfer family archives)

Eugen Liebendörfer (16 February 1852 in Leutkirch – 3 October 1902 in Stuttgart) was the first German missionary doctor in India as part of the Basel Mission. He was also a co-founder of the Association for Medical Mission at Stuttgart that evolved into the German Institute for Medical Mission (Difäm), an organization for worldwide Christian medical mission based in Tübingen.

== Early life ==
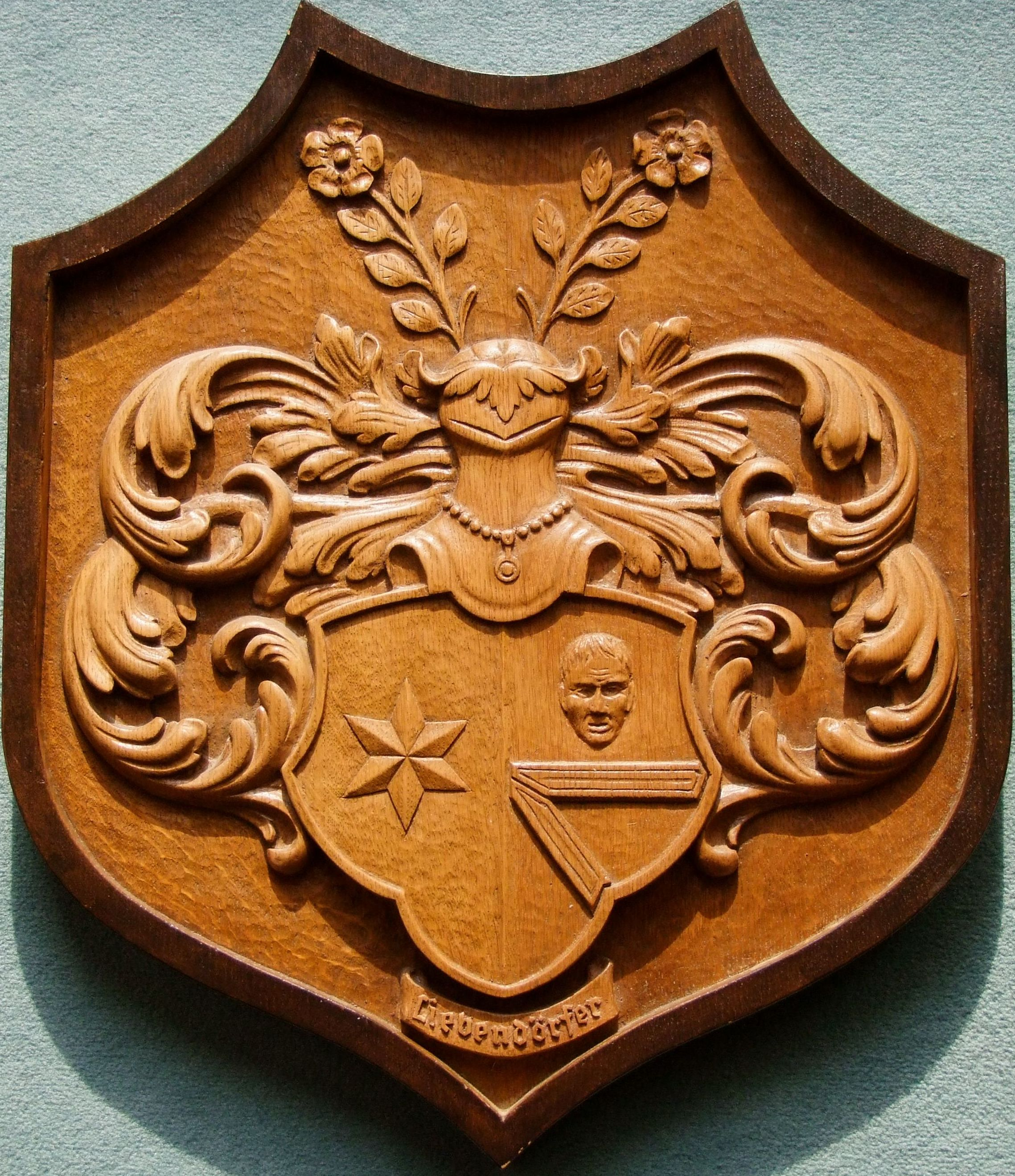
Coat of arms of the Liebendörfer family

The Liebendörfer family had been living in the Württemberg region since the end of the Thirty Years' War. Eugen Liebendörfer was the son of Jakob Friedrich Liebendörfer (who died in 1880 at Wain), who was the station commander of the Landjäger special police force in Leutkirch, and Elisabeth Lochbiller from Memmingen (who died in 1899 at Ravensburg).

== Work in India ==
Inspired by the Swabian Pietism movement of the German Lutheran church, Eugen Liebendörfer joined the Basel Mission. After training in Basel, he travelled to India as a missionary in 1875 at the age of 23. He arrived at the West Indian port of Calicut (Kozhikode) on 1 October 1875 and moved to work at the mission station at Thalassery, Malabar District (in the state of Kerala in modern south India) which was then part of the Madras Presidency of British Raj. Until 1846, this mission station used to be supervised by Julie and Hermann Gundert, who were the grandparents of Hermann Hesse.

On 5 November 1878, he married Emilie Lydia Layer (born in 1856 in Wilhelmsdorf, Württemberg) at the mission station at Thalassery.

Liebendörfer regularly published articles in a Malayalam news periodical and described the internal structure of the human body; in the opinion of Wilhelm Schlatter, the historiographer of the Basel Mission, the Indian doctors were not knowledgeable about this. He also prepared two booklets that discussed on the topics of caring for little children and marital responsibilities.

On 7 July 1882 Liebendörfer witnessed the tragic death of 60 people due to a bridge collapse incident caused by a ferry that had rammed into a bridge pier. However, he was able to rescue and supply 20 people from the river. Driven by this painful experience, he returned home by 1883 and studied medicine in Basel for about three and a half years, from 1883 to 1886. His thesis published in 1886 was titled "Über den Einfluss des Tropenklimas auf den Europäer : mit besonderer Berücksichtigung Ostindiens".

After completing his medical education, he became the first medical missionary doctor in Kerala and remained so until 1896. During this period, he rebuilt and furnished a hospital at Calicut. His success won him respect among the local population, even as they compared his modern medical treatment methods to those of a traditional local healer, although he attributed the medical success of his work as a work of God. He introduced a revolutionary change in the region, when he could start to treat women and examine them by listening with a stethoscope. Eventually, the British government also handed him over the leadership of a Leper hospital.

As the medical mission became more important and popular, many women from Malabar were also trained as doctors and nurses.

In 1893, he opened another small hospital in Kottakkal, about 44 km south of Calicut, and trained Indian doctors there. The funds required to run the hospital was raised from the people around, including resident British and natives; the church members of Kottakkal also contributed according to their ability, the poor offered one or two days of free labour at the hospital in lieu of monetary contributions.

== Return to Germany ==
By the end of 1895, owing to his serious illness, he returned to Stuttgart. He spent time in the Kurhaus Palmenwald in Freudenstadt, where he had friendly and close contact with the parents of Hermann Hesse.

In 1898, together with the entrepreneur Paul Lechler, Liebendörfer founded the Association for Medical Mission as an aid organization of the Basel Mission. Liebendörfer was the first managing director of this association and remained so until shortly before his death. The Association for Medical Mission formed the basis for the current Difäm (German Institute for Medical Mission).

== Death ==
Eugen Liebendörfer had chronic health issues and died at the age of 50 years in Stuttgart on 3 October 1902.

== Legacy ==
The hospitals he built at Calicut are still intact and one serves as a dormitory for girls. A second mission hospital was also built at Bettageri, Coorg as part of the Basel medical mission.

== Published works ==
Several articles and books have been published about Liebendörfer including a few listed below:

- Immanuel Kammerer: Dr. Eugen Liebendörfer : ein Bahnbrecher der deutschen ärztlichen Mission in Indien. Stuttgart Evang. Missionsverl. 1927.
- Immanuel Kammerer: Ein treuer Knecht des Herrn Leben und Wirken des Missionsarztes Dr. Eugen Liebendörfer in Kalikut. Stuttgart 1904.

== See also ==
- German Wikipedia article on Eugen Liebendörfer
