= Amoako Atta I =

Ghanaian paramount chief

Nana Amoako Atta I
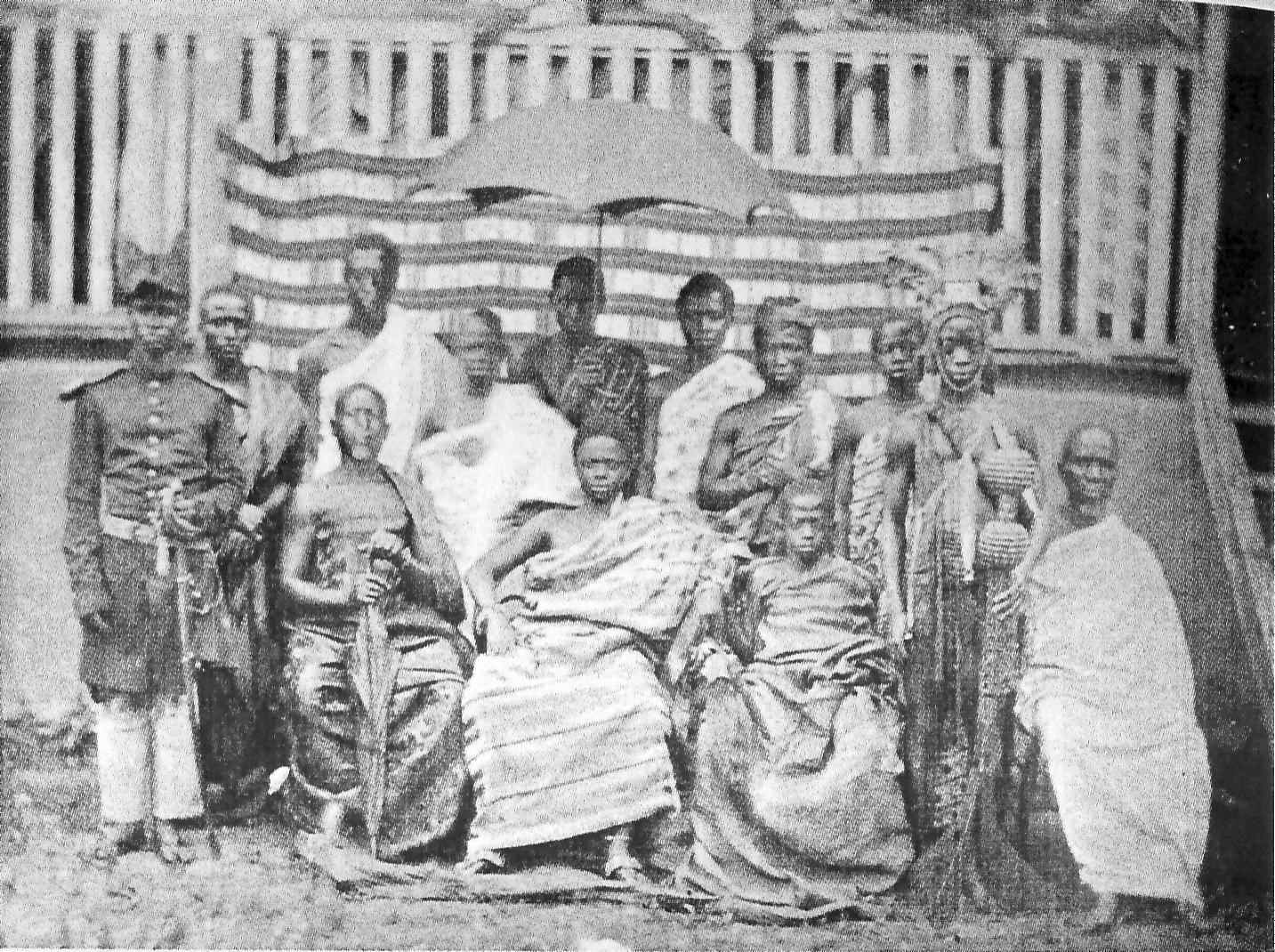
- Nana Amoako Atta and his entourage in exile in Lagos

Okyenhene of Akyem Abuakwa
- Reign: 1866 – 1880; 1885 – 1887
- Coronation: 1867
- Predecessor: Nana Atta Obuom
- Successor: Nana Amoako Atta II
- Born: Kwasi Panin; 1853; Kyebi, Gold Coast
- Died: 2 February 1887 (aged 33–34); Accra, Gold Coast
- Religion: Akan religion
- Occupation: Soldier; Paramount chief

Nana Amoako Atta I (born Kwasi Panin; 1853– 2 February 1887) was the paramount chief of Akyem Abuakwa in nineteenth century southern Ghana. Locally, his position is known as the Okyehene or Omanhene. He ruled the traditional kingdom from July 1866 to 1880 and from 1885 to 1887. After the Sagrenti War of 1874, the British declared Akyem Abuakwa a colonial possession, legally called a ‘protectorate’, as part of the Gold Coast. This development led to a clash between the old traditional Akan culture and the imposition of the new Western Christian political order.

== Biography ==
Born in Akyem Abuakwa capital, Kyebi in 1853, the young royal had his early education at the Kyebi Basel Mission Primary School. Kwasi Panin succeeded his uncle, Atta Obuom, popularly called Obiwom, as a teenager in 1867. He was an allied soldier in the Sagrenti Anglo-Ashanti War in 1874, fighting for the interests of British, led by Major-General Garnet Wolseley. After the war, there was a refugee internal migrant inflow from Juaben. He partnered with colonial officials to remediate the refugee crisis. He instructed one of his sub-chiefs, Nana Ampaw, divisional monarch of Kukurantumi in northeastern Kyebi to provide a parcel of stool land between Kukurantumi and Ejisu to the colonial government for the resettlement of the Juaben refugees who named their new home, New Juaben with their administrative capital at Koforidua.

During his reign, Amoako Atta I was accommodating to the Basel missionaries operating in his kingdom, as they had been his tutors a few years prior. School enrollment had skyrocketed by December 1867. Local shamans rejected the establishment of schools in the area. They feared the socio-cultural change that the new learning centres and Christian proselytism had wrought in their culture.

In the second half of 1868, missionary activity focusing on freeing palace-owned slaves resulted in rising political strain between the chief and Basel missionaries. As slaves became liberated, baptised and educated, Amoako Atta felt that his authority was being undermined by the Basel Mission, as new Christians lived in their own quarters called Salem. Furthermore, Amoako Atta I, his sister, Kyerewaa and, the Okyehene's mother, Ampofoaa, other royal courtiers and traditional state functionaries opposed the conversion of domestic slaves to Christianity and the abolition of local slavery as they viewed the practice as a wealth generator for influence peddling.

The Basel-trained missionary and Akan linguist, David Asante was the cousin of Amoako Atta and lived in Kyebi as the resident minister. He disagreed vehemently with his relations and preached the egalitarian ideals of freedom and justice which diluted the social hierarchy of African traditional authority. He encouraged the enslaved to defy their owners. By mid-1875, this anti-slavery campaign had led to the liberation of 100 to 200 slaves by David Asante and other Basel missionaries. As tensions escalated, British authorities requested the transfer of David Asante to a different mission station far from Kyebi. The departure of Asante did not repair deteriorated relations between the Basel Mission and the Akyem monarchy.

On 14 May 1880, Amoako Atta was convicted of arson, by an Accra court. As punishment, he was exiled to Lagos, Nigeria for a half-a-decade. The exiled Okyehene returned to the Gold Coast on 8 January 1885 and was re-enstooled as chief by popular acclaim of his subjects. At the end of 1886, the king's money, jewellery, and cloths were stolen from the palace. The natives blamed the catechist of the Kyebi Basel Mission Church, Joseph Bosompem for the pilfering, which culminated in clashes between traditionalists and Christians. In January 1887, the colonial government summoned Amoako Atta to a commission of enquiry set up in Accra to investigate the skirmishes.

== Death ==
He died from exhaustion and pneumonia on 2 February, 1887, before the commission hearings began.
