= Theophilus Opoku =

Gold Coast linguist, educator and missionary

The Reverend Theophilus Herman Kofi Opoku
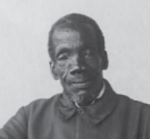
- Theophilus Opoku
- Born: 1842; Akropong, Gold Coast
- Died: 7 July 1913 (aged 70–71); Akropong, Gold Coast
- Education: Basel Mission Seminary, Akropong
- Occupations: Clergyman; Missionary; Philologist; Ethnolinguist; Translator; Educator
- Spouses: Sophie Nyam (m. 1868); Anna Mary Engmann (m. 1879)
- Children: 8
- Parents: Nana Yaw Darko (father); Nana Akua Korantema (mother)
- Relatives: Nana Addo Dankwa, Akuapemhene (grandfather); David Asante (cousin)

Ecclesiastical career
- Church: Basel Evangelical Missionary Society

Orders
- Ordination: 1 September 1872, Gold Coast

Theophilus Herman Kofi Opoku (1842 – 7 July 1913) was a native Akan linguist, translator, philologist, educator and missionary who became the first indigenous African to be ordained a pastor on Gold Coast soil by the Basel Mission in 1872. Opoku worked closely with the German missionary and philologist Johann Gottlieb Christaller as well as fellow native Akan linguists, David Asante, Jonathan Palmer Bekoe, and Paul Staudt Keteku in the translation of the Bible into the Twi language.

== Early life and education ==
Theophilus Opoku was born in 1842 at Akropong in Akuapem, about 48 km (30 miles) north of Accra. He was the son of Nana Yaw Darko, the linguist of the paramount chief and Nana Akua Korantema. Yaw Darko was a practitioner of the Akan traditional religion and died when Theophilus was young. Opoku's grandfather was the paramount chief of Akropong, Omanhene, Nana Addo Dankwa. His fellow linguist, David Asante was his cousin. During his childhood, he was often weak and frail. While playing outside his home one day, Opoku broke his leg and suffered multiple fractures and had to be taken to a bone-setter at Larteh for treatment. His health improved over time. Opoku decided to attend school and become a missionary. In 1851, he entered primary school at Akropong where his teachers his intellect became evident. He also became the houseboy of the Basel missionary, the Rev. J. Mader in 1852 and moved in with him. Opoku considered household chores to be demeaning and detested all forms of corporal punishment which was commonplace at the time. Pietist discipline and organisation was a hallmark of the Basel mission educational experience. In his view, only indentured labourers and domestic slaves deserved that kind of punishment. He was eventually baptised on 6 January 1856. He enrolled in the Basel Mission Seminary at Akropong in 1858 where he learnt Greek, Hebrew, Latin, dogmatics, homiletics, theology and pedagogy in the rigorous programme. He was diagnosed with a heart-related ailment and his health rapidly deteriorated thereafter. He was sent to a native herbalist or shaman at Adenya, a village near Akropong for a year-and-a-half and went back intermittently for further treatment. As part of his treatment, the herbalist apparently forbade him from drinking water for five months. Despite improvement in his condition, Opoku was forced him to abandon his studies as a result of the affliction.

== Missionary activities and Christian ministry ==
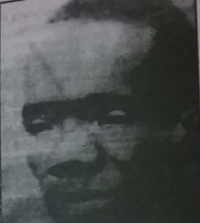
Theophilus Opoku

After leaving the seminary halfway through his studies, he became a pupil teacher at Mamfe near Akropong. His heart condition interrupted his work and he was assigned to a less strenuous role as a catechist at Larteh, south of Akropong. He found out at Larteh that the locals were vehemently opposed to Christianity and wanted a European missionary stationed there instead of an Akropong native due to the socio-political environment at the time. Thus, he returned to his hometown of Akropong. He was forcibly bound to palm fronds and taken to the porch of the Basel missionary, Johann G. Widmann. However, he was soon back at Larteh to support and run the operations of the mission there. This time, the people of Larteh were more receptive to the mission. According to historical accounts, he correctly predicted that a thunderstorm could lead to the fall of a silk cotton tree, "onyaa" near the shrine of the fetish priest at Akonedi in Larteh. The fetish priest rebuffed Opoku, stating that the tree had been there for centuries and never killed his ancestors. This event happened as foretold by Opoku and the fetish priest was killed. The people came to regard him as a “seer” and converted en masse to Christianity leading to the flourishing of his ministry.

In 1868, while Opoku was in the Akuapem district as a catechist, two Christian converts killed an animal species, considered the “spiritual child” of the local divinity of “Topere.” This escalated to a dispute which could not be resolved in the royal court. Opoku refused to pay any fines, asserting the authority of Christianity and God and stating that the idols could punish perpetrators on their own without any human intervention. Infuriated by his utterances, traditional authorities prohibited Christians from using the town's resources to fetch water or grow food. Christians had to go to other towns such as Amanokrom for food supplies or water. After a few weeks later, Opoku petitioned the chief to fetch water from the palace on humanitarian grounds. The palace obliged and the ban was lifted. Nonetheless, a decree was issued in 1869 that banned Mamfe natives from converting to Christianity. Parents of children who converted faced a monetary penalty, to be paid in cowries. Two girls, Kaade (c. 1845 – 1928) and Gyamea defied the edict and were baptized in March 1869 by Opoku, adopting the Judeo-Christian Germanic names, Wilhelmine and Maria respectively. This led to near skirmishes, the capture and persecution of the two converts until the British colonial Governor intervened in the matter to free the Christian girl-captives.

On 1 September 1872, Theophilus Opoku was ordained a minister of the Basel mission by the Johann G. Widmann together with the Gold Coast historian, Carl Christian Reindorf and Jamaican Moravian missionary, Alexander Worthy Clerk. Through his Christian ministry, he went to many towns and villages including a visit to the Togoland and the Northern Territories of the Gold Coast in 1877. He carried out ethnographic research in Salaga and his observations were captured in his diary which were ultimately published in the Christian Messenger in Basel in 1884. His accounts include everyday life of the Gonja people, the practice of Islam and the trans-Saharan slave trade. Within this period, the German ethnologist, Gustav Nachtigal (1834 –1885) also travelled extensively in that areas with detailed description of the culture of the inhabitants of northern Ghana. After he returned from Salaga, he contracted smallpox. During his sickness, he composed a Christian hymn, “Ohoho ne mamfrani na meye wo fam ha” meaning "I am a stranger and sojourner in this world", a song which is sung at Presbyterian funerals in Ghana and is allusion to his journey to Salaga. In 1877, he was transferred to Kukurantumi in Akyem Abuakwa after recovering from the disease. In 1884, he was posted to Adukrom, north of Akropong and to Mamfe in 1891. He won many Christian converts from heathenism in both places through his mastery of his native tongue, Guan language. His last station was his hometown, Akropong in the Twi District in 1899. There, he faced opposition, from his own kith and kin after criticised the lifestyles of natives, leading the traditional authorities to summon him before the royal tribunal.

In 1909, the Local Committee of the Basel Mission held a meeting at Aburi and appointed Opoku a member of the committee, making him the first African to serve in that role. However, he declined the offer due to ill-health and impending retirement.

He retired from active church work in 1911 at the age of 69.

== Literary work ==
Together with David Asante, he helped Johann Gottlieb Christaller in translating the Bible into the Twi language. He also contributed to the development of vernacular literature through his writings in classical Twi. His literary talent was honed while growing up in the royal court as the son of the chief's linguist.

== Selected works ==
Some of Opoku's selected works include:

- Christaller, J. G., Asante, David, Opoku, Theophilus (1871) “Anyamesem anase Kyerew Kronkron Apam-dedaw ne Apam-foforo nsem wo Twi kasa mu” (“The Holy Bible translated from the original tongues into the Twi language”), Basel
- Opoku, Theophilus (1872). “Autobiographic sketch” An unpublished manuscripts in the private collection of the Rev. E. T. Koramoah, Akuropon, Akuapem.
- Opoku, Theophilus (1884) “Extracts from Theophilus Opoku’s diary,” published as a series of articles in the Christian Messenger, Basel
- Opoku, Theophilus “Ɔhɔho ne mamfrani na meyɛ wɔ fam ha” - "I am a stranger and sojourner in this world" (Presbyterian hymn, PHB 791)

== Personal life ==
Theophilus Opoku had married his first wife, Sophie Nyam in April 1868. Nyam had received home science and domestic training from the German educator and missionary, Rosina Widmann (née Binder), the wife of the Johann G. Widmann. The Twi hymn, “Ɛhe po na m’agyenkwa wɔ? meaning "Where, O where, is my Saviour?” was composed by Sophia Nyam. Opoku and Nyam had four children: Samuel Ata Obuobisa, Victor Immanuel Bampo, John A. Dako (Mensa), and Ernestina D. Korantema. The first son, Samuel Opoku was born in January 1869. His wife, Sophia died suddenly while they were at Larteh and Opoku fell into depression. In 1879, he remarried, to Anna Mary Engmann, a Euro-African Ga teacher and organist from Christiansborg, Osu on the coast. Engmann had asthma, a condition which became a source of worry and anxiety for the family. His second marriage produced three children, one of whom, the Rev. C. E. Opoku became a Presbyterian clergyman. His children from the second marriage were: Christian Emmanuel Akufo, Theodor Pratonus Aniapam and Mina Asabea. The couple also adopted a son, Jacob Yaw Mose Owusu.

== Death and funeral ==
In mid-1913, during a visit to his cocoa farm at Suhyen, Theophilus Opoku became suddenly ill and died on his way to Akropong on 6 July 1913. At his funeral service held at the Christ Presbyterian Church, Akropong, the next day, 7 July 1913, he was eulogised by the Basel missionary, Nicholas Timothy Clerk, who was then the District Minister at Larteh and later became the first Synod Clerk of the Presbyterian Church of the Gold Coast, serving from 1918 to 1932.

== Legacy ==
The Gold Coast historian and pastor, Carl Christian Reindorf (1834 – 1917) narrated the success of the Basel missionaries between 1850 and 1875, capturing in part the legacy of Theophilus Opoku's life and work:.

“ Congregations had been gathered, schools founded, native assistants educated, the Bible translated into two languages, other books for school and church published in the native tongues, workshops opened, agriculture promoted. And as a step in the right direction, progress had been made towards building up a native church by several of the faithful catechists being ordained as pastors of congregations between 1868 and 1878. The report of 1879 says: ‘It was a joy and gladness, when our dear brethren, the Revs. Alexander Clerk, Christian Reindorf and Theophilus Opoku received this token of confidence and appreciation of faithful services by our Committee.’ ”

== Literature ==
- Debrunner, H. W. (1967) “A History of Christianity in Ghana”, Accra: Waterville Publishing House
- Iheanacho, Maureen O. (2013).Christianising the Heathen Theophilus Opoku's Mission and Ministry in Nineteenth-century Gold Coast AmaraZaane CSL
- Iheanacho, Maureen O. (2014). "Theophilus Opoku, Indigenous Pastor and Missionary Theologian, 1842-1913." Sub Saharan Publishers
- Iheanacho, Maureen O. (ed.) (2018).By Foot to Salaga Theophilus Opoku's Diary of a Momentous Journey (1877) Dots Concept
- Keleku, H. K. (1965) “David Asante and Theophilus Opoku,” Accra: Waterville Publishing House
