= Mark Sever Bell =

Recipient of the Victoria Cross

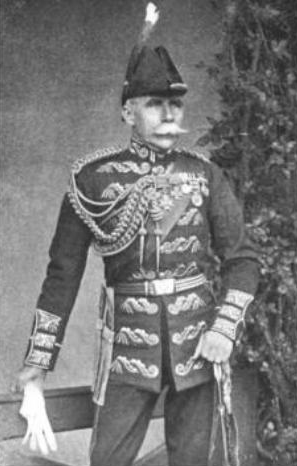
- Born: 15 May 1843; Sydney, New South Wales, Australia
- Died: 26 June 1906 (aged 63); Windlesham, Berkshire, England
- Burial place: All Soul's Churchyard, South Ascot, Berkshire
- Military career
- Allegiance: United Kingdom
- Branch: British Army
- Rank: Colonel
- Units: Royal Engineers
- Conflicts: Bhutan War; Third Anglo-Ashanti War
- Awards: Victoria Cross; Companion of the Order of the Bath

Colonel Mark Sever Bell, VC, CB (15 May 1843 – 26 June 1906) was an English recipient of the Victoria Cross, the highest award for gallantry in the face of the enemy that can be awarded to British and Commonwealth forces. Born in the Australian colony of New South Wales, his family travelled to England when he was an infant.

He was educated at King's College School and King's College London, where he was made a Fellow in 1890.

Bell was 30 years old, and a lieutenant in the Corps of Royal Engineers, British Army during the First Ashanti Expedition when the following deed took place on 4 February 1874 at the Battle of Ordashu, Ashanti (now Ghana) for which he was awarded the VC:

For his distinguished bravery, and zealous, resolute, and self-devoted conduct at the battle of Ordahsu, on the 4th February, 1874, whilst serving under the immediate orders of Colonel Sir John Chetham McLeod, K.C.B., of the 42nd Regiment, who commanded the Advanced Guard. Sir John McLeod was an eye witness of his gallant find distinguished conduct on the occasion, and considers that this Officer's fearless and resolute bearing, being always in the front, urging on and encouraging an unarmed working party of Fantee labourers, who were exposed not only to the fire of the Enemy, but to the wild and irregular fire of the Native Troops in the rear, contributed very materially to the success of the day. By his example, he made these men do what no European party was ever required to do in warfare, namely, to work under fire in the face of the Enemy without a covering party.

He later achieved the rank of colonel. While serving as the commanding officer of Shornecliff military barracks at Folkestone Kent in 1890 a curious incident involving Colonel Bell occurred making national news. The colonel had been expecting 11 packages by mail wagon but the postman counted 12 addressed to the recipient. While driving his horse and cart up Sandgate hill, a pothole in the road jolted the vehicle and its contents which fell onto the street with the 12th package spilling open. It was revealed to be a stone pickle jar in which was found the dead body of a male infant whose chest had been mutilated and top of the skull removed. The colonel denied any knowledge of who had sent the package; policemen traced the sender of the package back to a fashionable West-End London address. The property was owned by a wealthy young lady who claimed that the parcel may have been sent by her brother, a doctor and pathologist, who had died three years earlier and who supposedly kept human specimens. However, it appears that the young lady may have either perverted the course of justice or possibly had not been prosecuted for her crime due to her social status.

He was placed on half-pay in August 1898.

He died at Windlesham and is buried at All Soul's Churchyard, South Ascot, Berkshire, England. A headstone marks his grave.

His Victoria Cross is displayed at the Royal Engineers Museum, Chatham, England.
