= Christian Messenger (Ghana) =

Ghanaian newspaper

- Type: Monthly
- Owner: Presbyterian Church of Ghana
- Founder: Basel Mission
- Publisher: Waterville Publishing House
- Founded: 1883; 143 years ago
- Language: English
- City: Accra
- Country: Ghana

The Christian Messenger is an English-language monthly publication and the official newspaper of the Presbyterian Church of Ghana. It is the oldest continuously operating faith-based news journal in Ghana, and one of the oldest newspapers in the country. It was set up on the Gold Coast in 1883 by the Basel Evangelical Missionary Society. The first issue was published in Basel on 1 March 1883 under the editorship of the German missionary and philologist, Johann Gottlieb Christaller who had then retired from the mission.

== History ==
Christaller noted that many German Basel missionaries were not proficient in the English language and urged prospective writers to make use of English scholars for further review and proofreading before final submission to him, the editor, as he was not a native English speaker. A few months before, in a letter to the editor from Christiansborg dated 13 October 1882, the first Basel missionary-trader Hermann Ludwig Rottman inferred that "the primary aim of the journal was to encourage people who were not proficient in English to write in Twi or Ga" A similar news publication, the Christian Messenger and Examiner had earlier been founded in 1859 by Wesleyan missionaries, Thomas Birch Freeman and Henry Wharton as a medium to translate foreign literature and classical works into native African languages.

Originally, the medium of publication was English, Ga and Twi. The newspaper temporarily changed its name to the "Christian Reporter" and published solely in Twi while the "Christian Messenger" was printed in Ga. Subscription climbed to a readership of 600 but sharply decreased over time. After Christaller's death in 1895, the printing of the newspaper ceased. Production started again in 1905 at then newly established Basel Mission Printing Office in Akropong.

The newspaper has opinion pieces, news bulletins, advertisements, banns of marriage and obituaries and funeral announcements of notable individuals associated with the Presbyterian Church of Ghana. The newspaper also publishes feature articles on topical issues like Fruit of the Spirit, etc. and publishes authoritative information on the various groups in the Church such as the Women's Fellowship, the Young People's Guild (YPG) and the Young Adult Fellowship (YAF).

The administration of the church appoints an editor-in-chief for a tenure of about four years. General oversight and management of the newspaper is carried out by an Editorial Board. The Basel Missionaries originally established the newspaper as a way “to inform, educate, evangelize and entertain its readers... to the north, east, west and south” corners of the Church. The Basel Mission under the United Trading Company (UTC) aimed to win over converts to Christianity through its readership, in addition to provision of Christian activities, general news, entertainment, travel journals as well as relevant political events and on the Gold Coast. This was in line with the original aim of the newspaper which was "to encourage African scholars to write in Twi and Ga." The newspaper also informs readers about the developments within the church, its structure and hierarchy, Presbyterian terminologies as well as the work of the Presbyteries, Districts, Congregations. Today, the newspaper also covers socioeconomic issues, political trends, military history and contemporary changes in global society.

== Notable editors ==
- Johann Gottlieb Christaller, Basel missionary, translator, linguist and philologist – Editor, 1883 – 1895
- Carl Henry Clerk, Gold Coast educator, administrator, journalist, editor and Presbyterian minister – Editor, 1960 – 1963
- Gottlieb Ababio Adom, Gold Coast educator, journalist, editor and Presbyterian minister – Editor, 1966 – 1970
