= David Asante =

Gold Coast linguist, educator and missionary (1834 – 1892)

The Reverend David Asante
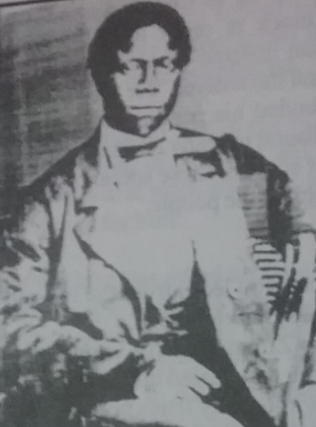
- David Asante
- Born: 23 December 1834; Akropong, Gold Coast
- Died: 13 October 1892 (aged 57); Akropong, Gold Coast
- Education: Basel Mission Seminary, Akropong; Basel Mission Seminary, Basel, Switzerland
- Occupations: Clergyman; Missionary; Philologist; Ethnolinguist; Translator
- Spouse: Lydia Martha Otuwa (m. 1864)
- Children: 11
- Parent: Nana Owusu Akyem
- Relatives: Nana Adum Tokori, Okuapehene (granduncle); Theophilus Opoku (cousin); Amoako Atta I (cousin)

Ecclesiastical career
- Church: Basel Evangelical Missionary Society

Orders
- Ordination: Basel Minster, 1862

David Asante (23 December 1834 – 13 October 1892) was a philologist, linguist, translator and the first Akan native missionary of the Basel Evangelical Missionary Society. He was the second African to be educated in Europe by the Basel Mission after the Americo-Liberian pastor, George Peter Thompson. Asante worked closely with the German missionary and philologist, Johann Gottlieb Christaller and fellow native linguists, Theophilus Opoku, Jonathan Palmer Bekoe, and Paul Staudt Keteku in the translation of the Bible into the Twi language.

== Early life and education ==
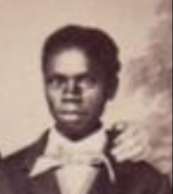
David Asante, Basel

David Asante was born on 23 December 1834 at Akropong-Akuapem, capital of Akuapem, a state 30 miles (48 km) northeast of Accra. His father was Nana Owusu Akyem of the ruling Asona clan and direct cousin of the then Okuapehene, Nana Adum Tokori. Asante's father was a personal friend of Andreas Riis, the Danish minister and first Basel missionary-survivor on the Gold Coast. David Asante's cousin was his fellow linguist, Theophilus Opoku. As a child, he began his formal education when his father gave him to the Basel missionary, Johann G. Widmann as a houseboy and a year later, he was sent to J. C. Dieterle to become a personal assistant in his household. He learnt English during his time with the two missionaries who described him as hardworking and bright.

On 25 December 1847, David Asante was baptised by a Basel missionary and became one of the first converts to Christianity in his hometown. By his own account, he had his conversion experience during a singing exercise at school when he sang the hymn, “Come ye sinners, poor and needy,” popularized by the American gospel singer and composer Ira D. Sankey. A few months earlier, he had witnessed the conversion of two labourers, Anum and Tettey at Osu on Pentecost Sunday. These two experiences had a profound effect on Asante, leading to his conversion, which ultimately created a rift between him and his mother who saw the whole episode as sacrilege.

In 1848 he was among five students in the pioneer class of the newly opened Basel Mission Seminary at Akropong, for a five-year course training as a teacher-catechist and becoming proficient in German, Greek, Latin, and Hebrew. Other members of the foundation class were John Powell Rochester, Paul Staudt Keteku, William Yirenkyi and Jonathan Palmer Bekoe. At the Akropong seminary, he was taught by the Jamaican Moravian missionary, Alexander Worthy Clerk who was an instructor in Biblical studies.

In August 1857, the church awarded him a bursary for further training as a priest at the Basel Mission Seminary in Basel, Switzerland. For five years, he received instruction in theology, philosophy, linguistics and philology. In 1860, while in Basel, his brother Oforikae joined him but died a year later from tuberculosis. He was ordained a pastor in the Basel Minister in 1862. He returned to his homeland in June of that year.

== Missionary activities and Christian ministry ==
After his graduation from the Akropong seminary, he was posted to Larteh as a missionary, 8 km or 5 miles southeast of Akropong. Here, he encountered fetishism and paganist customs of the old traditional religion. He built a chapel, mission house and founded the first Christian congregation there. After two years at Larteh, he was transferred to Gyadam then the capital of Akyem Kotoku, on the Birim River, about 15 miles (24 km) north of Kyebi, as an assistant to the Basel missionary, Simon Süss. Notable among divinities he found in these towns were Akonedi, Ohyiawu, Konkom and Katawere. He was not able to win converts in Gyadam.

On his return home from Basel as an ordained minister, he worked with the Basel Mission at Akropong under the mentorship of J. G. Widmann. In 1864, he was transferred to Larteh for a second time. This time he encountered hostility and found out that the small group of Christians in the town was being persecuted. The traditional authorities hired the youth in Larteh to destroy the properties of Christian converts. By 1867, there were 200 congregants in the Basel Mission Church at Larteh.

He faced one of his greatest tests as a missionary in 1871 when he was sent to Begoro, north of Kyebi, one of the divisions of the Akyem Abuakwa state, on a fact-finding mission to gather details of two Basel missionaries, FrIedrich A. Ramseyer and J. Kühne, were being held in captivity by the Ashanti stool. That mission was fruitless. However, Ramseyer and Kühne were later freed during the British invasion of Kumasi in the heat of the Sagrenti war between 1873 and 1874.

David Asante established a mission station in 1872, at Kukurantumi, a division of Akyem Abuakwa. There a school for converts was opened and new congregation was started comprising mainly individuals who were formerly indentured labourers.

In 1874, the Akyem Abuakwa capital, Kyebi assumed district status which meant the town could host both a minster and a catechist. In 1875, he replaced a European missionary at Kyebi, where he faced intimidation and litigation from his own relatives. His cousin, the paramount chieftain of Akyem Abuakwa, the Okyehene, Amoako Atta I, his sister, Kyerewaa and, the Okyehene's mother, Ampofoaa, and other state functionaries were opposed to conversion of domestic slaves to Christianity and the abolition of local slavery as they viewed the practice as a source of income and political power. Protestant missionaries preached the ideals of egalitarianism which diluted the social hierarchy of African traditional authority. Furthermore, Asante as a mission agent adhered to the Slave Emancipation Ordinance passed by the colonial government. He encouraged slaves to defy their slave masters and by June 1875, as many as a 100 to 200 slaves had severed ties with their masters. Several royal courtiers including his relatives lost slaves as a result of his campaign.

By December 1876, Asante had baptized many former slaves of the stool including Johannes Bosomtwe, the sword bearer; Noah Duodu, the horn blower; Thomas Amoadeefo, the chief executioner and Yaw Boakye, the Okyehene's brother-in-law who doubled as the state treasurer or Sanaahene. This situation led to the persecution of Christian converts. The monarchy instigated the burning and destruction of the Christian quarters or Salem which hosted farms, chapels and homes of converts. This tyranny has been referred to as the “Akyem Abuakwa Persecutions” by historians. Eventually, the British authorities got wind of the political tensions and sensing a possible disturbance of the erstwhile colonial power structure requested that the Basel mission transfer Asante to different town. Many mission workers and coverts fled to the Kwahu mountain ranges or hid in forests, others escaped to the coast while a few returned to the old traditional religion to protect their families.

His next mission station was a small, unevangelised small town, Nsakye near Aburi, about 20 miles (32 km) north of Accra. He observed an unusual practice in this town: Euro-Africans from the coast came to the town to consult a local seer named “Onyaawonsu”. Culturally, the natives viewed these Euro-African creoles as foreigners as their lifestyle was similar to that of the Europeans settlers.

Asante then went to Anum on the eastern bank of the Volta River, 50 miles (80 km) inland, to reopen a mission station there which was closed as a result of the Asante-Togoland conflict of this period. The people there were more receptive to the Christian revival. His ministry took him to Nsakye, Akwamufie, Boso, Kpalime, Peki, Buem and Worawora. These new developments encouraged him to venture into farther towns such as Palimé, Togo, Salaga in northern Ghana and Kete-Krachi where the people rejected Christian proselytizing in favour of the village idol, “Odente”.

He sold copies of the Twi Bible in 1885 in the Central Province coastal towns of Cape Coast, Saltpond, Winneba, Kwanyako and Nsaba. Earlier in the 1870s, Asante had translated the Bible in collaboration with Christaller. He went to Kumasi where he met the Basel missionary, Ramseyer who was a political prisoner in Ashanti from 1869 to 1874. While in Kumasi in 1888, he preached the Gospel to the Asantehene, Nana Karikari. Shortly thereafter, he returned to his hometown, Akropong but faced hostility as he was a staunch defender of the rights of Christian converts when they were brought before the tribunal of the Omanhene of Akropong who was the paramount chief of the town.

== Literary work in the Twi language ==
After mission work in Gyadam, Asante was transferred to the seminary at Akropong as a tutor and partnered with Johann Gottlieb Christaller to prepare school pamphlets for teaching in the Twi language. He also helped Christaller in translating the Bible into Twi. David Asante was instrumental in developing literature in the Twi language. These literary works included translations of a book on the history of Germany, known as the Kapa History, and John Bunyan’s Pilgrim’s Progress, which discussed and ancient heathenism. Other translations of works into the Twi language include Man’s Heart, Satan’s Abode and Ancient Heathenism of Germany, an exposé of Germanic pagan rituals. He composed the Twi hymn, “Wiase yi nya hyew a, nnipa nyinaa” which is often sung at Presbyterian funerals in Ghana. The hymn alludes to “end of the world” events, pertaining to the Judgement Day in Christian eschatology.

== Selected works ==
David Asante's published works include:

- Christaller, J. G., Asante, David, Opoku, Theophilus (1871) “Anyamesem anase Kyerew Kronkron Apam-dedaw ne Apam-foforo nsem wo Twi kasa mu” (“The Holy Bible translated from the original tongues into the Twi language”), Basel
- Asante, David, Christaller, J. G. (1872), “Kristofo Nyamesam ho Kyere” (“The Doctrine of the Christian Religion”), Basel, (Twi translation)
- Asante, David (1872) “Kapa History,” Basel (Twi translation)
- Asante, David (1873) “Abofra Ayisaa Nhoma Bi” (“The Orphan’s Letter”) by Oguyomi of Ibadan, booklet, Basel (Twi translation)
- Asante, David (1874) “Onipa Koma” (“Man’s Heart”), Basel
- Asante, David (1874) “Wiase abasem mu nsemma-nsemma wo Twi kasa mu” (“Stories from General History”), Basel, translated from German into Twi, 2nd revised and augmented edition edited by J. G. Christaller, Basel, 1893
- Asante, David (1875) “Germane Asase So Krisosto” (“Christianity in Germany”), Basel (Twi translation)
- Asante, David (1912) “Twi Kenkan Nhoma” (“Twi Reading Book”), Books I-IV, 5th ed., Basel
- Asante, David “Okristoni Akwantu” (“Pilgrim’s Progress”) by John Bunyan, Basel, (Twi translation)
- Asante, David,“Wiase yi nya hyew a, nnipa nyinaa” PHB Twi Hymn 832

== Personal life ==
On July 28, 1864, David Asante married Lydia Martha Otuwa, a Ga woman from Osu, Accra who was a teacher at the girls’ boarding school at Abokobi. The couple had eleven children.

== Death ==
In early October 1892, he suffered a stroke during a church service at the Christ Presbyterian Church in his hometown, Akropong. He died on 13 October 1892. His words on his dying bed were, “I have finished my course, I am only expecting an everlasting rest”.

== Literature ==
- J.G. Christaller (1875), “A Grammar of the Asante and Fante Language Called Tshi (Twi, Chee) Based on the Akuapem Dialect With Reference to Other (Akan and Fante) Dialects,” Basel
- J.G. Christaller (1881) “A Dictionary of the Asante and Fante Language Called Tshi (Chwee, Twi),” Basel, 2nd revised edition, edited by J. Schweizer, published as “Dictionary of the Asante and Fante Languages called Tshi (Twi),” Basel, 1933
- Debrunner, H. W. (1967), “A History of Christianity in Ghana,” Accra
- Keteku, H. K. (1965) “David Asante and Theophilus Opoku,” Accra: Waterville Publishing House
- Keteku, H. K. (1965), “The Reverend David Asante,” Accra: Waterville Publishing House
- Schlatter, W. (1916) “Geschichte der Basler Mission 1815-1915” (“History of the Basel Mission”), Basel,
- Smith, N. (1966) “The Presbyterian Church of Ghana 1835-1960,” Accra
- Articles by David Asante in “The Christian Messenger,” between 1883 and 1890, Basel
