= Johann Gottlieb Christaller =

German missionary and linguist

The Reverend Johann Gottlieb Christaller
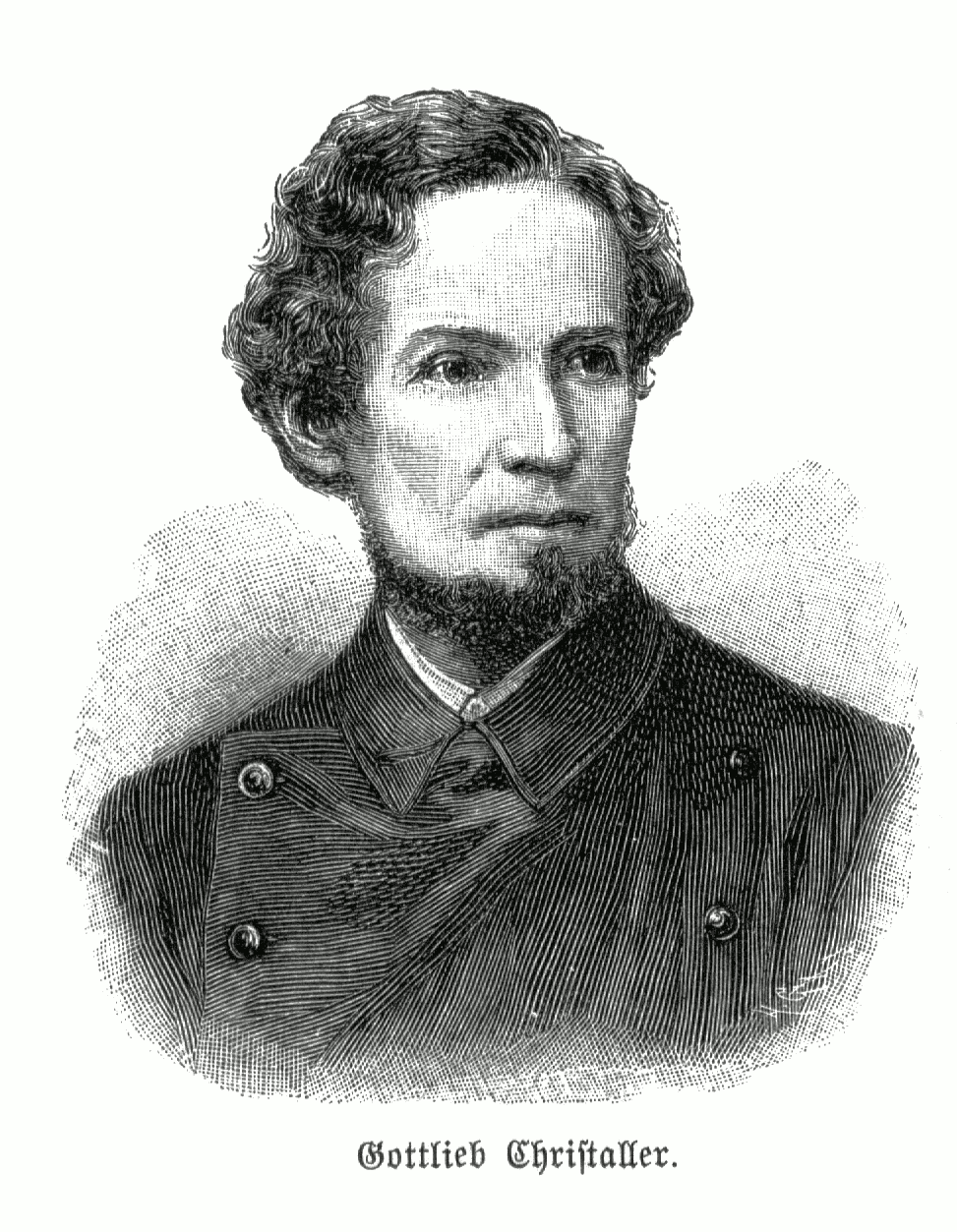
- Johann Gottlieb Christaller
- Born: 19 November 1827; Winnenden, Kingdom of Württemberg
- Died: 16 December 1895 (aged 68); Stuttgart, Kingdom of Württemberg
- Education: Basel Mission Seminary, Basel, Switzerland
- Occupations: Priest, Philologist
- Spouses: Christiane Emilie Ziegler (m. 1857; died 1866) Bertha Ziegler (m. 1872)
- Children: 10 including Erdmann Gottreich, Theodor Benjamin and Hanna
- Religion: Christianity
- Church: Basel Evangelical Missionary Society

Orders
- Ordination: 7 November 1852, Basel Minster

Johann Gottlieb Christaller (19 November 1827 – 16 December 1895) was a German missionary, clergyman, ethnolinguist, translator and philologist who served with the Basel Mission. He was devoted to the study of the Twi language in what was then the Gold Coast, now Ghana. He was instrumental, together with African colleagues, Akan linguists, David Asante, Theophilus Opoku, Jonathan Palmer Bekoe, and Paul Keteku in the translation of the Bible into the Akuapem dialect of Twi. Christaller was also the first editor of the Christian Messenger, the official news publication of the Basel Mission, serving from 1883 to 1895. He is recognised in some circles as the "founder of scientific linguistic research in West Africa".

== Early life and education ==
Johann Christaller was born in Winnenden, near Stuttgart in the then Kingdom of Württemberg, now in the German state of Baden-Württemberg. His father was a tailor and a subsistence farmer of modest background, who was keen on books and had a large personal library with more than 2000 books. Johann Christaller had two sisters, Johanna and Christiane. His father died when Christaller was only a year old, throwing the family into extreme poverty. To make ends meet, his mother and sister started a sewing business and lending books from his late father's library. J. G. Christaller spent his childhood days honing his talent in philology and linguistics by reading his father's books. Christaller received basic additional private instruction in Latin and Greek. He was a brilliant student and won a bursary, freeing his family from paying tuition at school. Christaller, influenced by the Pietist movement within the German Lutheran church, decided very early in his life to become a missionary.

Later, from 1841 to 1844, Christaller was an apprentice and an assistant to a town clerk in the mayor's printing office in Winnenden Among his options after his apprenticeship were entering the public service, going to a university to study languages or going to the seminary in Basel. He opted to enroll at the seminary. In May 1847, Christaller applied for admission to the Basel Mission Seminary and Training School in Basel, Switzerland, starting his studies in September 1848 at age of 20. At Basel in 1852, he started learning the Twi language through Hans Nicolaus Riis whose uncle was the first Basel missionary survivor on the Gold Coast, Andreas Riis. He was ordained as a pastor on 7 November 1852. During his studies there, he helped edit the grammar of the Twi language. By the end of his seminary education, in addition to his native German, he had become fluent in English, Greek, Hebrew, and Latin.

== Literary work on the Gold Coast ==
According to scholars, Christaller was “deeply influenced by the sociohistorical theories of Johann Gottfried Herder (1744–1803), whose views on the life cycle of communities and on the equality of different cultures was opposed to the historical conception of the Enlightenment, which considered Western civilization as superior to other cultures and as the ideal and goal toward which other cultures did or should aspire.”

In 1853, Johann Christaller was posted to Ghana by the Basel Mission Home Committee, stationed at Akropong, about 32 miles (51 km) north of Accra while his classmate August Steinhauser was sent to Christiansborg, Osu. Christaller arrived at Osu, now a suburb of Accra, on 25 January 1853. At the Akropong mission station, he met other missionaries, Widmann, Dieterle and Joseph Mohr. After his arrival on the Gold Coast, he became an instructor at the recently founded Basel Mission Seminary at Akropong-Akuapem, established in 1848. The seminary had ten students at the time. The Basel Mission by that time had also started a boys' school that had forty-one pupils and a girls' school with thirty-two pupils. It became apparent to Christaller that without a written local language, the efforts by the mission to propagate the Gospel would prove futile. His giftedness in linguistics allowed him to transform an oral language into written form. His main assignments included the translation of the Bible and complex Christian literary works for the growing native Christian communities, after quickly mastering the Twi language. Christaller also stayed at Aburi, 20 miles (32 km) north of Accra, from 1862 to 1865. From 1865 to 1867, he was based at Kyebi in Akyem Abuakwa, 50 miles (80 km) north of Accra. He again lived in Akropong from 1867 to 1868.

There were variations in Twi as Christaller encountered and the language was known as Odschi, Oji, Tschi or Twi in that period. Hans Nicolaus Riis who he had earlier met in Basel had done philological work on the Gold Coast in 1845: Elemente des Akwapim Dialects de Odschi Sprache (1853) and Grammatical Outline and Vocabulary of the Oji Language with Special Reference to the Akuapem Dialect Together with a Collection of Proverbs by the Natives (1854). These works were a useful guide to Christaller. Based on these literary works, Christaller chose the Akuapem dialect to be the written form of Twi even though he learnt the version spoken at Akyem Abuakwa while living in Kyebi. Moreover, the Basel Mission on the Gold Coast had its headquarters at Akropong and the dialect of spoken Twi first assumed a written form by 1853.

He justified this selection in one of his published books, Grammar of the Asante and Fante Language Called Tschi (1875): "The Akan and Fante dialects do not differ so much as ancient Greek dialects or as the different English and German dialects; neither are they spoken by as many individuals. And when more than forty millions of Germans enjoy a common book-language, half a million Fantes may more easily be brought to a common medium of communication by writing." He further commented on the choice of Akuapem Twi for his literary works, "It is an Akan dialect influenced by Fante, steering in the middle course between other Akan dialects and Fante in sounds, forms and expressions; it admits peculiarities of both branches as far as they do no contradict each other, and is, therefore, best capable of being enriched from both sides." To buttress his point, his fellow linguist and native Akan missionary, David Asante added, "Akuapem easily admits of enrichment and admixture from Akyem and even Fante; and Fante also admits and receives such foreign elements; but if the same should be done in the Akyem dialect, it would not sound well.”

Due to ill health, he returned to Germany between 1858 and June 1862 just before he was stationed at Aburi. The Acts of the Apostles and the Four Gospels were published in Twi in 1859 and 1864 respectively. Different volumes of the entire New Testament became publicly available in 1863 followed by Psalms and Proverbs in 1866. The Twi translations of several Pauline epistles were also published in Basel: Letter to the Romans, 1 and 2 Peter, James and Jude, 1, 2 and 3 John, Revelation (1861); 1 and 2 Corinthians, Galatians, Ephesians, Philippians, Colossians, and 1 and 2 Thessalonians (1862); 1 and 2 Timothy, Titus, Philemon, and Hebrews (1863).

After the death of his wife in 1866, he relocated to Akropong. He worked on translating the complete text of the Bible into Twi together with David Asante and Theophilus Opoku. The fully corrected manuscript was finally published in Basel in December 1871. The work on the second edition of the Twi Bible was carried out from 1897 to 1900 and eventually published by British and Foreign Bible Society. He stayed largely in Ghana until 1868 when he went back to Europe and settled in Schorndorf. Christaller published his scientific grammar of the Twi language in 1875. The Dictionary of the "Asante and the Fante Language—called Twi" (two volumes) was published in 1881 which by all accounts was the masterpiece of his literary career. This dictionary was a lexicon of Akan socio-cultural and religious customs. Between 1883 and 1895 Christaller became the editor-in-chief of the Christian Messenger, which is the oldest continuously perating faith-based newspaper in Ghana. The first edition of that newspaper was published on 1 March 1883. In an appraisal of his work, the scholar, Noel Smith noted, "Christaller’s work achieved three things: it raised the Twi language to a literary level and provided the basis of all later work in the language; it gave the first real insight into Akan religious, social, and moral ideas; and it welded the expression of Akan Christian worship to the native tongue.”

In his later years, he was an Elder in his local church and attended several Pietist fellowships in the area. From time to time, he visited his old colleagues in Basel.

=== Other views ===
Translation as a mediation tool

J. G. Christaller believed that had the British colonial administrators known the depth and breadth of literary work conducted in Twi, the Sagrenti War between 1873 and 1874 during which the British invaded Asante could have been prevented. In his grammar book published in 1875, Christaller noted that a letter written in English from the then British Governor, Sir Garnet Wolseley to the Asantehene, Otumfuo Nana Kofi Karikari, which suggested a peace treaty between the British and Asante could have been authored in the Twi language. That letter was intercepted by Amankwa Tia, a subject of the Ashanti stool.

Fante literary work by English scholars

Christaller did not have a high opinion on the literary work, Mfantsi Grammar (1868) written by British philologists, D. L. Carr and J. P. Brown and printed in Cape Coast. The book mimicked English principles in phonetics and orthography which Christaller saw as ill-suited for the Akan language in general. In 1913, an updated second edition was published by J. P. Brown in response to Christaller's criticism.

== Personal life ==
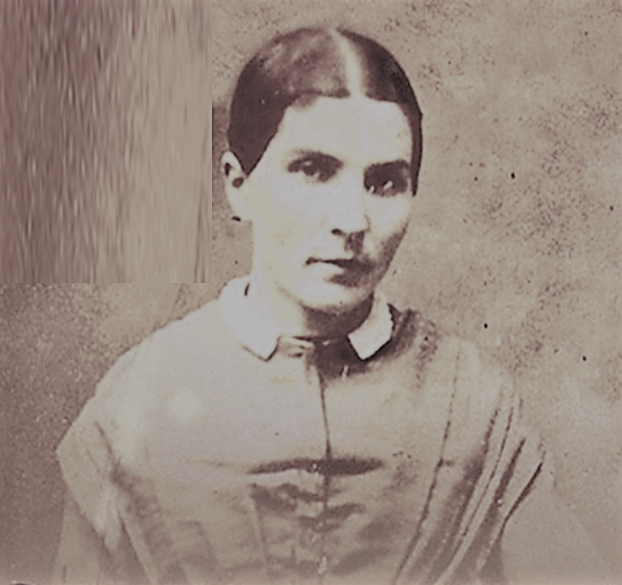
Christiane Emilie Ziegler

Johann Christaller married Christiane Emilie Ziegler, a fellow missionary and a native of Waiblingen on 27 January 1857 at Akropong. Ziegler had earlier arrived on the Gold Coast in December 1856. Her parents were Christian Ludwig Ziegler and Rosine Kübler. They had five children in all, four sons and a daughter. They include Erdmann Gottreich Christaller, a Protestant pastor and writer, Theodor Benjamin Christaller, "Empire" school teacher in Cameroon and Hanna Christaller, who wrote "Kolonial novellen (Togo)". Emilie died on 13 August 1866 at Kyebi in Akyem Abuakwa at the age of 37. She was buried under a palm tree at the old Basel Mission cemetery in Keybi. He returned to Germany in 1868. He later married Bertha Ziegler, sister of his late wife Christiane in 1872. They also had four sons and a daughter.

== Publications and awards ==
His best known publications include A Grammar of the Asante and Fante Language Called Tshi (Twi, Chee) Based on the Akuapem Dialect with Reference to Other (Akan and Fante) Dialects published in 1875 and A Dictionary of the Asante and Fante Language Called Twi, ISBN 978-1104592219, published in 1871 followed by an updated edition in 1881 and a revised version in 1933. These were both done in Basel. He also wrote a book on Catechism (1857) as well as Hymnbooks (1878–1891) and Twi Proverbs, a Collection of 3600 Twi Proverbs (1879). He was awarded the Volney Prize by the Institut de France in 1876 and 1882.

=== Selected works ===
The following publications are some of Christaller's literary works:

- Christaller, J. G. (1875) “A Grammar of the Asante and Fante Language Called Tschi (Chwee, Twi) Based on the Akuapem Dicalect, With Reference to Other (Akan and Fante) Dialects” – “Twi mmebusem mpensa-ahansia mmoaano”, Basel
- Christaller, J. G., Asante, David, Opoku, Theophilus (1871) “Anyamesem anase Kyerew Kronkron Apam-dedaw ne Apam-foforo nsem wo Twi kasa mu” (“The Holy Bible translated from the original tongues into the Twi language”), Basel
- Christaller, J. G., Locher, C. W., Zimmermann, J. (1874) “A Dictionary, English, Tshi (Asante), Akra; Tshi (Chwee) Comprising as Dialects: Akan and Fante; Accra connected with Adangme; Gold Coast, West Africa,” Basel
- Christaller, J. G., (1879) “A collection of 3,600 Tshi Proverbs In Use Among the Africans of the Gold Coast as Speaking the Asante and Fante Language, Collected, Together with their Variations, and Alphabetically Arranged,” Basel
- Christaller, J. G., (1881) “A Dictionary of the Asante and Fante Language Called Tschi (Chwee, Twi) With a Grammatical Introduction and appendices on the Geography of the Gold Coast and Other Subjects,” Basel, 2nd rev. ed., edited by J. Schweizer in 1893, published as “A Dictionary of the Asante and Fante Languages Called Tshi (Twi),” Basel
- Clerk, N. T. with foreword by Christaller, J. G. (1890), "Neue Reise in den Hinterländen von Togo, nach Nkonya, Buem, Obooso, Salaga, Krakye, 2. Dezember 1889 bis 5. Februar 1890," Mitteilungen der geographischen Gesellschaft für Thüringen, vol. IX, pp. 77 – 98 [An account of the northern Volta of the Gold Coast, written entirely in German in the "Missionsgeorgraphischer Teil" of the periodical, Journal of the Geographical Society of Thuringia]
- Christaller, J. G. (1892), “Die Sprechen Afrikas,” Stuttgart
- Christaller, J. G. (1929) Missionar J. G.Christaller: Erinnerungen aus seinem Leben Stuttgart and Basel

== Death and legacy ==
Christaller died on 16 December 1895, just before undergoing surgery. His last words were, "My work is coming to an end and my Sabbath is coming. The marked hands and legs [of Christ] have done all of that for me."

=== Akrofi-Christaller Institute ===
The Akrofi-Christaller Institute of Theology, Mission and Culture is a postgraduate research and training Institute located at Akropong which awards its own degrees. It promotes "the study and documentation of Christian history, thought and life in Ghana and in Africa as a whole, in relation to their African setting and to world Christianity". It was named after ethnolinguists, Clement Anderson Akrofi and Johann Gottlieb Christaller.

== Literature ==
- Friedrich Agster, Winfried Maier-Revoredo, Margarete Henninger: "... destined for Africa". On the 100th anniversary of the death of the missionary and linguist Johann Gottlieb Christaller. Protestant church community and city Winnenden, Winnenden 1995
- Friedrich Wilhelm Bautz: Christaller, Johann Gottlieb. In: Biographisch-Bibliographisches Kirchenlexikon (BBKL). Volume 1, Bautz, Hamm 1975. 2nd, unchanged edition Hamm 1990, ISBN 3-88309-013-1, Sp. 1001-1002. (Biographical Bibliographic Church Lexicon)
- Paul Steiner: Christaller, Joh. Gottlieb. In: Allgemeine Deutsche Biographie (ADB). Volume 47, Duncker & Humblot, Leipzig 1903, pp. 480-483.
- Diedrich Hermann Westermann: Christaller, Johann Gottlieb. In: Neue Deutsche Biographie (NDB). Volume 3, Duncker & Humblot, Berlin 1957, ISBN 3-428-00184-2, p. 219 ( digitized).

== See also ==
- Basel Mission
