= Akuapem-Akropong =

- Country: Ghana
- Region: Eastern Region (Ghana)

Akuapem-Akropong is a town in the Eastern region of Ghana. The town is known for being a site of mission station run by the Basel Mission, the first institution of higher learning, when Presbyterian Training College was established in 1848, Akropong School for the blind established in 1945, and Okuapeman Secondary School. The political system used in this town is the institution of Chieftaincy. The school is a second cycle institution. This town is also the capital of the Akuapem Traditional Area
