= Basel Mission =

Swiss Christian missionary society

Mission 21
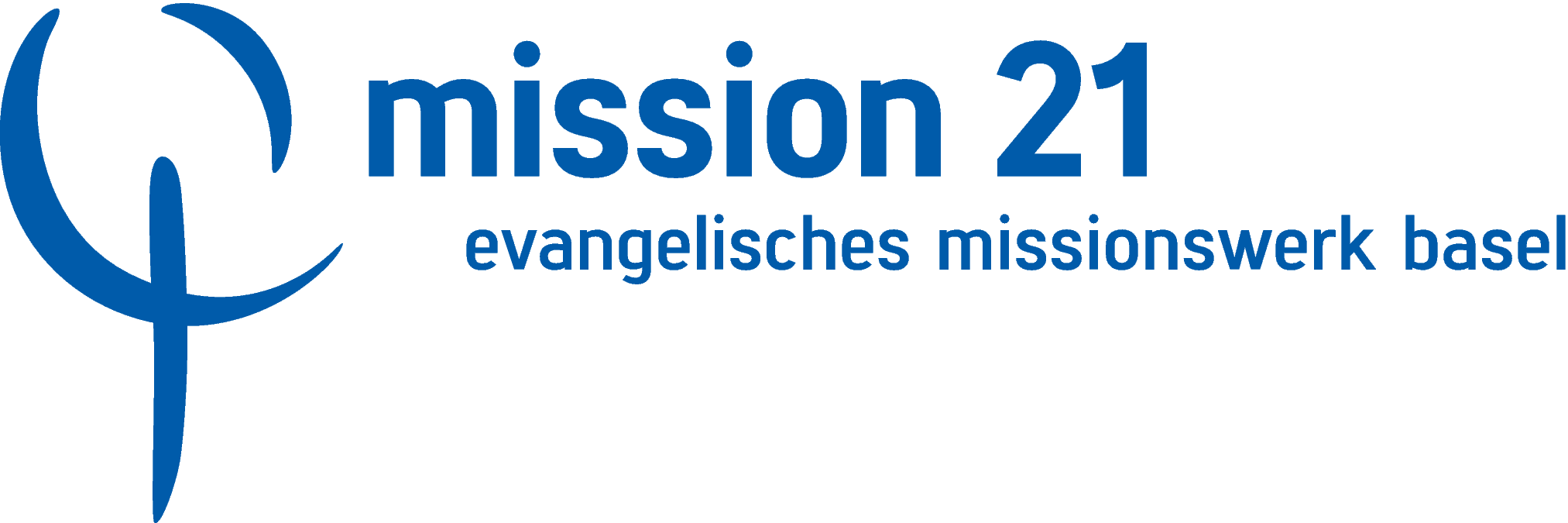
- Predecessor: German Missionary Society; Basel Evangelical Missionary Society; Basel Mission Society; Basel Mission
- Formation: 25 September 1815; 211 years ago
- Type: Christian missionary society
- Purpose: Missions, theological, cultural exchange and research; Development cooperation in poverty reduction, peacebuilding, health, women and gender
- Headquarters: Basel, Switzerland
- Location: Missionsstrasse 21, Basel, Switzerland
- Region served: Worldwide especially Africa, Asia and Latin America
- Official language: English; German
- President: Evelyn Borer
- Director: Jochen Kirsch
- Website: Mission 21

The Basel Mission was a Christian missionary society based in Switzerland. It was active from 1815 to 2001, when it transferred the operative work to Mission 21. Mission 21 is the successor organization of Kooperation Evangelischer Kirchen und Missione (KEM), founded in 2001. Now Basel Mission is one of the supporting organizations of Mission 21.

In 2024, the Basel Mission changed its structure to a foundation; at that time, its president was Karl F. Appl.

== History ==
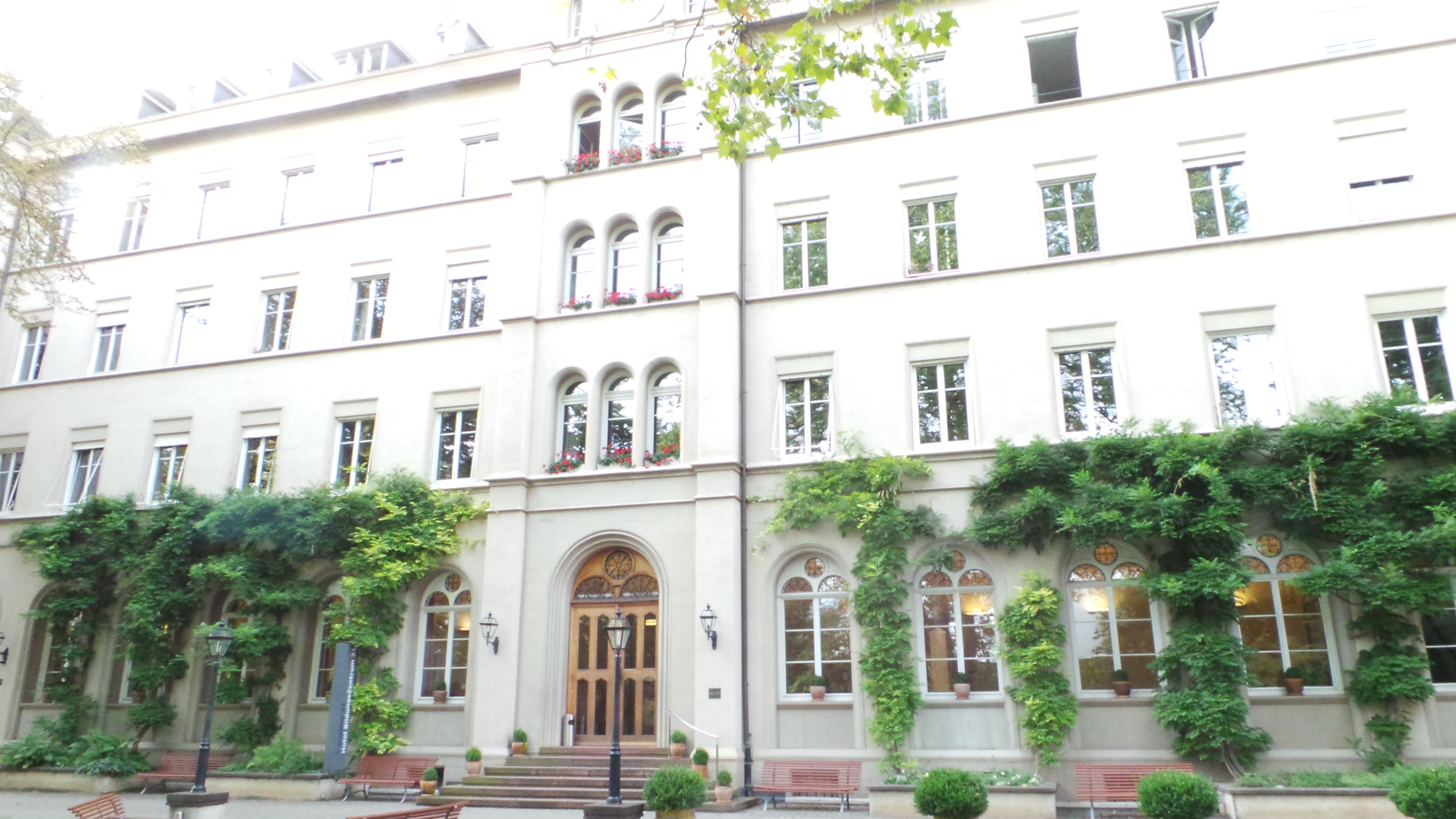
Archives building of the Basel Mission

From the outset the society set out to be Protestant but non-denominational. Arising from concerns about what would happen if Napoleon managed to seize the city of Basel, both Calvinists from Basel and Lutherans from Württemberg made a holy vow to establish the seminary if the city was spared. The Basel mission was the result. The first president of the society was the Reverend Nikolaus von Brunn.

The mission was founded as the German Missionary Society in 1815. The mission later changed its name to the Basel Evangelical Missionary Society, and finally the Basel Mission. The society built a school to train Dutch and British missionaries in 1816. Since this time, the mission has worked in Russia and the Gold Coast (Ghana) from 1828, India from 1834, China from 1847, Cameroon from 1886, Borneo from 1921, Nigeria from 1951, and Latin America and the Sudan from 1972 and 1973. On 18 December 1828, the Basel Mission Society, coordinating with the Danish Missionary Society, sent its first missionaries, Johannes Phillip Henke, Gottlieb Holzwarth, Carl Friedrich Salbach and Johannes Gottlieb Schmid, to take up work in the Danish Protectorate at Christiansborg, Gold Coast. On 21 March 1832, a second group of missionaries including Andreas Riis, Peter Peterson Jäger, and Christian Heinze, the first mission doctor, arrived on the Gold Coast only to discover that Henke had died four months earlier.

A major focus for the Basel Mission was to create employment opportunities for the people of the area where each mission is located. To this end the society taught printing, tile manufacturing, and weaving, and employed people in these fields. The Basel Mission tile factory in Mangalore, India, is such an endeavour. The organization gave a high priority to uplifting the role of native women, and used women missionaries as role models of what Christian womanhood ought to be.

In West Africa, the Basel Mission had a small budget and depended on child labour for many routine operations such as daily household chores. The children were pupils in the mission schools who split their time between general education, religious studies, and unpaid labour. The Basel Mission made it a priority to alleviate the harsh conditions of child labour imposed by slavery, and the debt bondage of their parents.

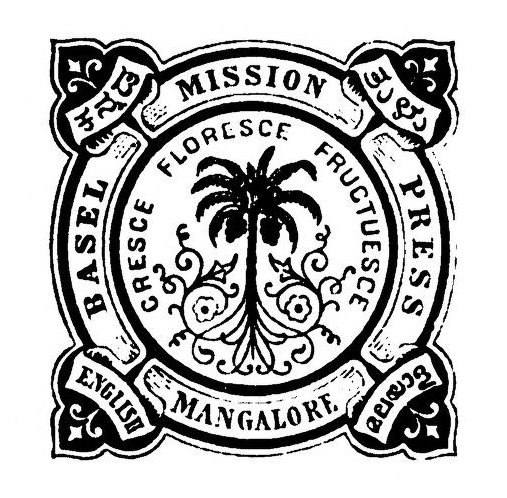

The Basel Mission initially tried to print evangelical material in Bombay but this was laborious. In 1841, Gottfried Weigle obtained a printing press from Bombay and brought it back to Mangalore in 1842 with two Marathi printing assistants. The printing press was named as Basel Mission Press In 1842, they published a Kannada pamphlet by Moegling and made 1500 copies. The next item was Christian Greiner's Tulu translation of St. Matthew's Gospel. In July 1843, the press began the first Kannada newspaper called "Mangalur-samachar" edited by Hermann Moegling. Two issues a month were produced until February 1844, after which it was printed in Bellary.

=== Recent activities ===
Since World War II, the mission has operated abroad via local church congregations. As of November 2002, the major countries or regions of operation were Bolivia, Cameroon, Chile, Hong Kong, the Democratic Republic of the Congo, Indonesia, Malaysia, Nigeria, Peru, Singapore, Sudan and Taiwan.

== Basel Mission Seminary ==
The Basel Mission Training Institution (BMTI) partnered for some time with the Anglican Church Mission Society. Important missionaries to Palestine like Bishop Samuel Gobat and John Zeller were trained at the seminary. The first inspector (director) of the institute was Stuttgart native Christian Gottlieb Blumhardt (1779–1838). The curriculum covered four core areas:

- Theology – Bible Studies, Bible Passages, Biblical History, Pastoral Care, Old Testament, Old Testament Exegesis, New Testament, New Testament Passages, Faith and Morality, Patristics, Dogmatics, Systematic Theology, History of Christianity, Scriptures for Homiletic Use, Basic Homiletics (Preaching), Catechesis, Mission History, Methods of Missionising, Church History and World History
- Linguistics – Philology (study of languages), Hebrew, Greek, Latin, German, English and Dutch Grammar
- Skills Training – Arithmetic, Calligraphy, Orthography (writing and spelling skills), Rhetoric and Correspondence, Map-making/Cartography, non-European geography, Geography, Anatomy and Physiology, Basic medicine, Surgery, Botany, Logic/Philosophy and Useful knowledge (integrated Physics, Chemistry and Mathematics)
- Supplementary Instructions – Parish record-keeping, Interacting with Catholic missions, Drawing, Music, Singing, Reading and Technical drawing/Civil engineering

== Inspectors of the Basel Mission ==
The following ordained ministers served as the Inspector or Director of the Basel Mission:

Inspector	Tenure of office
The Rev. Christian Gottlieb Blumhardt	1816–1838
The Rev. Ludwig Friedrich Wilhelm Hoffmann	1839–1850
The Rev. Joseph Friedrich Josenhans	1850–1879
The Rev. Otto Schott	1879–1884
The Rev. Praetorius	1881–1884
The Rev. Theodor Oehler	1884–1909
The Rev. Oettli	1909–1931
The Rev. Huppenbauer	1932
The Rev. Kellerhals	1932

=== Presidents/Directors/Inspectors of the Basel Mission ===
- Christian Gottlieb Blumhardt (1779–1838), inspector from 1816 to 1838
- Ludwig Friedrich Wilhelm Hoffmann (1806–1873), inspector from 1839 to 1850
- Joseph Friedrich Josenhans (1812–1884), inspector from 1850 to 1879
- Adolf Christ (1807–1877), President from 1854 to 1877
- Otto Schott (1831–1901), inspector from 1879 to 1884
- Theodor Oehler (1850–1915), inspector from 1884 to 1915
- Friedrich Würz (1865–1926), inspector from 1898 to 1910, then director until 1916
- Heinrich Dipper (1868–1945), inspector from 1910 to 1913, vice director from 1913 to 1915, director from 1915 to 1926
- Karl Hartenstein (1894–1952), director from 1926 to 1939
- Alphons Koechlin (1885–1965), President from 1939 to 1959
- Jacques Rossel (1915–2008), President from 1959 to 1979
- Daniel von Allmen, President from 1979 to 1989
- Wolfgang Schmidt, President from 1989 to 1998
- Madelaine Strub-Jaccoud, director from 1998 to 2000

Since 2001, the operational work of the Basel Mission has been carried out by Mission 21. The presidents of the Basel Mission and the supporting association of Mission 21 are:

- Paul Rutishauser, President from 2001 to 2007
- Karl-Friedrich Appl, President of the Board since 2007

== Notable individuals affiliated to the Basel Mission ==
- Rose Akua Ampofo
- David Asante
- Emilie Christaller
- Johann Gottlieb Christaller
- Alexander Worthy Clerk
- Nicholas Timothy Clerk
- Hans Werner Debrunner
- Peter Fjellstedt
- Herman Gundert
- Peter Hall
- Theodore Hamberg
- Hermann Herlitz
- Regina Hesse
- Eugen Liebendörfer
- Rose Ann Miller
- Hermann Mögling
- Catherine Mulgrave
- Volbrecht Nagel
- Theophilus Opoku
- Fritz Ramseyer
- Carl Christian Reindorf
- Andreas Riis
- George Peter Thompson
- Rosina Widmann
- Johannes Zimmermann
- Elisabeth Petitpierre
- Eva Lombard

== See also ==
- Basler Handelsgesellschaft
- Protestant missionary societies in China during the 19th Century
- History of Ghana
