= Kwabena Boateng =

Ghanaian politician

Hon. Kwabena Boateng MP

Member of the Ghana Parliament for Ejisu
- Incumbent
- Assumed office 17 May 2024
- Preceded by: John Kumah
- President: John Dramani Mahama
- Vice President: Jane Naana Opoku-Agyemang

Personal details
- Born: 26 September 1987 (age 38) Ejisu-Onwe, Ashanti Region, Ghana
- Party: New Patriotic Party
- Education: Kwame Nkrumah University of Science and Technology (LLB, LLM); Kumasi Anglican Secondary School; Hannover Medical University
- Occupation: Politician
- Profession: Lawyer

Kwabena Boateng is a Ghanaian politician, lawyer and member of the Ninth Parliament of the Fourth Republic of Ghana representing the Ejisu Constituency in the Ashanti Region on the ticket of the New Patriotic Party.

== Early life ==
Boateng was born in Ejisu located in the Ashanti Region of Ghana. He graduated university from Hannover medical university, Germany. He was nominated as a consultant and one of the pioneers that took part in the heart transplantation programme at Hannover, where also thought.

== Career ==
Boateng is a politician and a lawyer by profession.

== Education ==
He studied at Kwame Nkrumah University of Science and Technology (KNUST) Faculty of Law from 2010 to 2014. He also went to Kumasi Anglican Secondary School (KASS).

== Politics ==
=== NPP Primaries ===
Boateng was the former 2nd Vice Chairman of Ejisu constituency.

Ahead of the April 30, 2024, by-election, the New Patriotic Party (NPP) in the Ejisu Constituency held internal elections, with Lawyer Kwabena Boateng officially proclaimed the victor by the Electoral Commission of Ghana.

Boateng contested for NPP Primaries and won with 394 votes out of a total of 1033, followed by Helena Mensah who had 302 votes. Yaa Gyamera Aboagye also had 229 votes, Evans Duah with 63, former GFA boss Kwesi Nyantakyi who also contested had 35, Portia Baffoe Abronye had 6 votes, Aaron Prince Duah and Klinsman Karikari Mensah had 2 votes each. Jacqueline Abena Pokua Amoah-Boaitey had none of the votes.

Speaking to the media after winning, Lawyer Kwabena Boateng promised to lead a unified front within the party in the constituency in order to hold onto the parliamentary seat of Ejisu in the next by-election.

=== Ejisu By-election ===
The election was contested by Kwabena Boateng, Beatrice Boakye, Esther Osei, Gabriel Agyemang, Joseph Attakora, and Kwabena Owusu Aduomii.

Kwabena Boateng of the New Patriotic Party won the election with 27,782 votes, which accounts for 55.8% of the total votes cast. Mr. Kwabena Owusu Aduomi, his closest competitor, also had 21,534 votes, representing 43.3% of the total votes.

The by-election was held as a result of the death of John Ampontuah Kumah on March 7, 2024. A prominent contender in the election was Kwabena Owusu Aduomi, an Independent candidate who had previously served as the constituency's three-term NPP member of parliament.
