= John Kumah =

Ghanaian politician and lawyer (1978–2024)

John Ampontuah Kumah
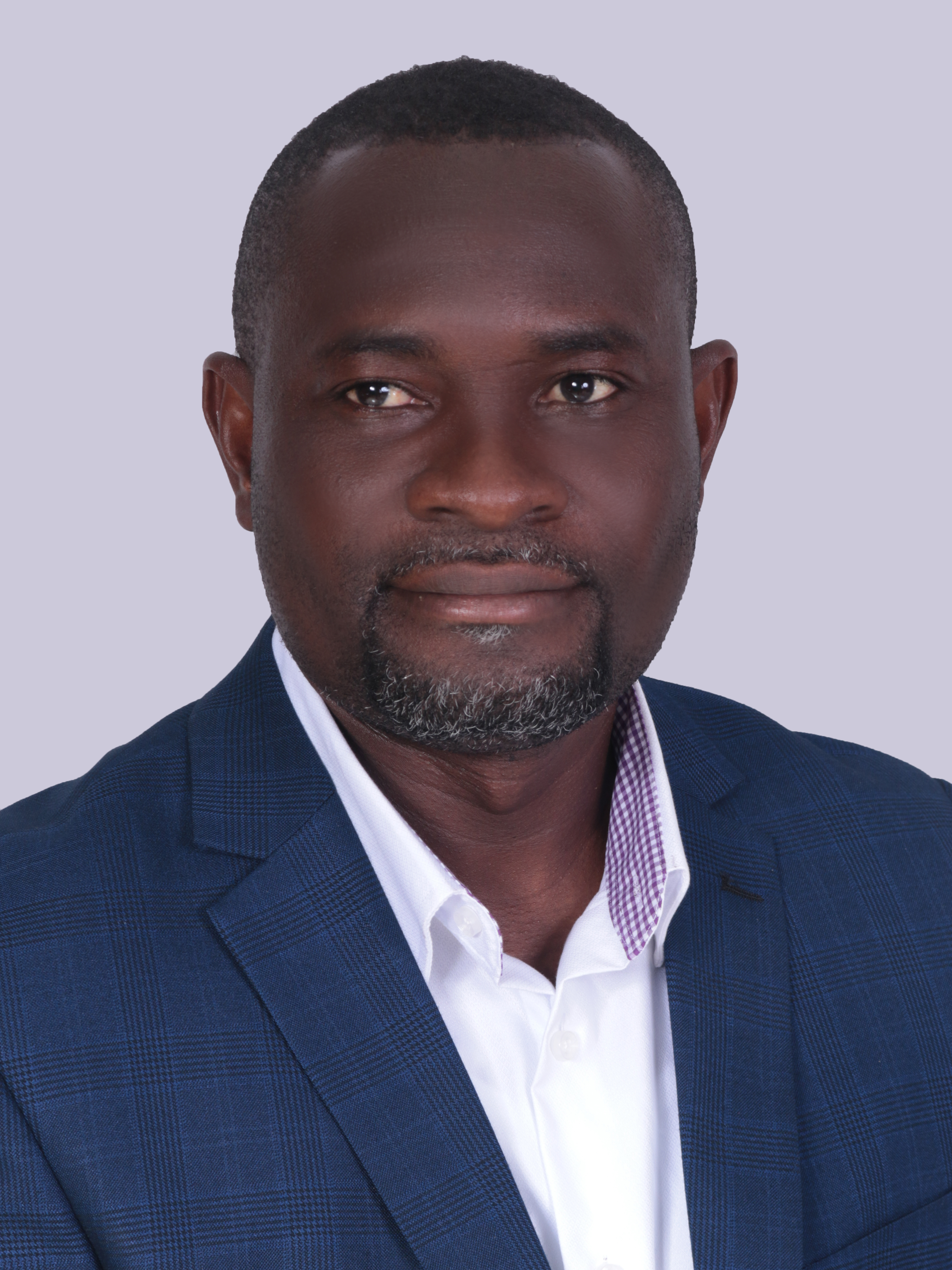

Deputy Minister for Finance
- In office 25 July 2021 – 7 March 2024
- President: Nana Akufo-Addo

Member of Parliament for Ejisu Constituency
- In office 7 January 2021 – 7 March 2024
- Preceded by: Kwabena Owusu Aduomi

Personal details
- Born: 4 August 1978 Ejisu, Ghana
- Died: 7 March 2024 (aged 45)
- Party: New Patriotic Party
- Education: Opoku Ware School; University of Ghana; GIMPA; Ghana School of Law
- Occupation: Politician
- Profession: Lawyer

John Ampontuah Kumah (4 August 1978 – 7 March 2024) was a Ghanaian politician, businessman, preacher and a lawyer. He served as the chief executive officer of the National Entrepreneurship and Innovation Programme (NEIP) until elected as the Member of parliament for the Ejisu constituency in the 2020 Ghanaian general election on the ticket New Patriotic Party (NPP).

== Early life and education ==
John Kumah was born on 4 August 1978. He hailed from Ejisu Odaho, a farming community in the Ejisu Municipal in the Ashanti Region of Ghana. Kumah completed Opoku Ware School in Kumasi for his secondary level of education in 1997. He continued to the University of Ghana (Legon) in 1997 and was awarded a Bachelor of Arts in Economics with Philosophy after four years. In the year 2009, he was awarded an MBA (Finance) from GIMPA. He also had a Degree in Law (LLB) from the University of Ghana and a Professional Law Degree (BL) from the Ghana School of Law. He also had his Post Graduate Diploma in Applied Business Research from the Nobel International Business School in 2019.

In November 2020, Kumah received a Doctorate in Business Innovation from the Swiss Business School in Switzerland. He also had a Masters in Applied Research (Business Innovation) from the same institution.

== Career ==
He was called to the Ghana Bar as a solicitor and legal practitioner for the Supreme Court of Ghana in 2013. He was a founding member and Managing Partner of Aduaprokye Chambers; a Law Firm located at Adabraka. He also worked as the founder of Majak Associates Ltd, a building and construction company, until his appointment as the CEO of NEIP in 2017. John Ampontuah Kumah had over fifteen years of experience in leadership, creativity, innovation and resourcefulness in creating jobs, and supporting youth development.

He has been a member of the New Patriotic Party (NPP) since 1992, and has worked in its communication department.

=== Politics ===
In 2020, John Kumah contested and won the Parliamentary seat for the Ejisu constituency on the ticket of the NPP. In parliament, he was the Vice Chairperson of the Constitutional, Legal and Parliamentary Affairs Committee and also a member of the Appointments and Subsidiary Legislation committees.

At the time of his death, he held the position of Deputy Finance Minister, an appointment he received in 2021.

On May 17, 2023, he was part of the team that secured the IMF Executive Board's US$3 billion loan to cushion the economic woes the country was facing during that period.

=== Honours and awards ===
John Kumah was judged the most efficient, prominent appointee for 2018 and was also listed among President Akufo Addo's top 20 Most Humble and respectful Appointees In 2019.

He was honoured for having the Most Outstanding Integrity as a CEO on 2 June 2020 by the Africa Centre for Integrity and Development (ACID), an Africa-based anti-corruption and Good Governance advocacy Civil Society Organization.

Kumah on Friday, August 23, 2019 received yet another award as the most outstanding CEO and Influential Transformational Leader from GEHAB Events.

The All African Student Union (AASU) honoured the former Chief Executive of National Entrepreneurship and Innovative Plan-NEIP at its 6th summit in Ghana for his extraordinary zeal of promoting students' activism and entrepreneurship.

== Personal life ==
John Kumah married Apostle Lilian Kumah, the Founder and Senior Pastor of Disciple of Christ Ministries Worldwide, in 2007. They had six children.

=== Philanthropy ===
In August 2022, John Kumah made payments for five different sets of prostheses for some victims of road accidents. They were Peter Mensah and Moses Addai.

In March 2024, he donated GH₵120,000 (roughly US$9,400 at the time) towards repairing the boys' dormitory at Ejisu Senior High Technical School.

=== Death ===
John Kumah died after battling Multiple Myeloma for a short time in Ghana, on 7 March 2024, at the age of 45. Kumah's burial took place on May 18, 2024, in Onwe, his hometown, which was also the location where his one-week observation ceremony was held.
