= Mohammed Boakye Agyemang =

Ghanaian politician

MP for Ejisu-Juaben
- In office 7 January 1993 – 6 January 1997
- President: Jerry John Rawlings
- Preceded by: John Emmanuel Amoah
- Succeeded by: Akwasi Osei-Adjei

Personal details
- Born: 2 January 1949 (age 77) Juaben, Ashanti Region Gold Coast (now Ghana)
- Party: National Democratic Congress
- Education: Ofori Panin Senior High School
- Alma mater: Presbyterian College of Education, Akropong
- Occupation: Politician
- Profession: Teacher

Mohammed Boakye Agyemang (born 2 January 1949) is a Ghanaian politician and a member of the first Parliament of the fourth Republic representing the Ejisu-Juabeng constituency in the Ashanti Region of Ghana. He represented the National Democratic Congress.

== Early life and education ==
Agyemang was born at Juaben in the Ashanti Region of Ghana. He attended Ofori Panin Secondary School where he obtained his GCE Ordinary Certificate, and the Presby Training College in Akropong, where was awarded his Teachers' Training Certificate.

== Politics ==
Agyemang was elected into parliament on the ticket of the National Democratic Congress to represent the Ejisu-Juabeng Constituency (now split into the Ejisu Constituency and the Juaben Constituency) in the Ashanti Region of Ghana during the 1992 Ghanaian parliamentary election. During the 1996 Ghanaian general election, he was defeated by Akwasi Osei-Adjei of the New Patriotic Party who polled 34,521 votes out of the total valid votes cast representing 63.20% against his (Mohammed Boakye Agyeman) 10,103 votes which represented 18.50% of the total valid votes cast. Kwasi Baidoo of the Convention People's Party polled 569 votes representing 1.00% of the total valid votes cast, and Kwame Owusu Agyeman of the People's National Congress polled 428 votes representing 0.80% of the total valid votes cast.

== Career ==
Agyeman is a teacher by profession and a former member of parliament for the Ejisu-Juabeng Constituency. He resigned from being the Ejisu-Juaben Municipal Chief Executive (MCE) in 2011.

== Personal life ==
Agyeman is a Muslim (Islam).
