= Yaa Asantewaa =

Ashanti queen mother and military leader

Queen Mother Yaa Asantewaa I Warrior
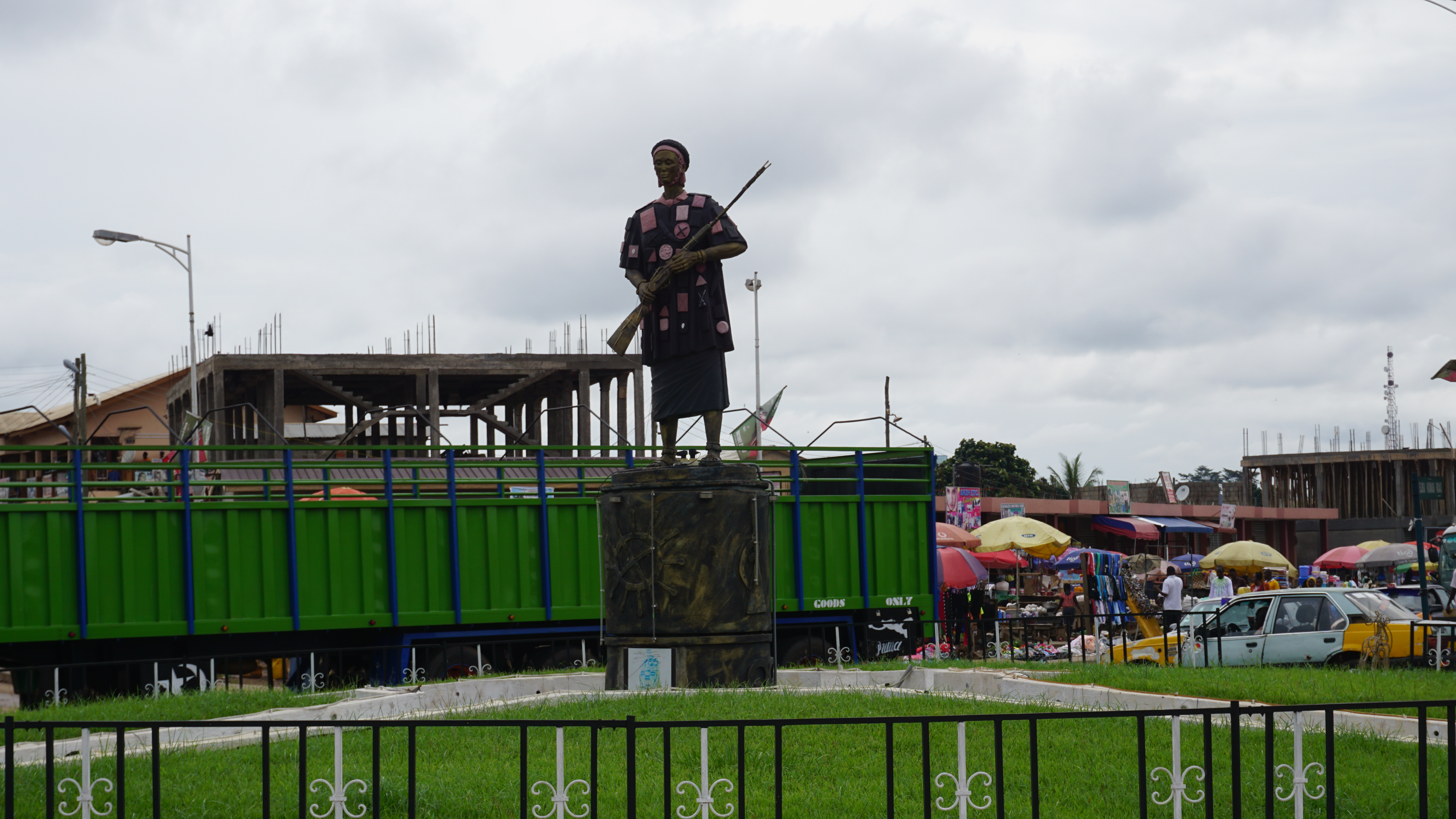
- statue of Yaa Asantewaa
- Born: Nana Yaa Asantewaa c. 1840; Besease, Ashanti Empire
- Died: 17 October 1921 (aged 80–81); Seychelles
- Children: One
- Military career
- Allegiance: Ashanti Empire
- Yaa Asantewaa War: War of the Golden Stool

Yaa Asantewaa I (c. 1840 – 17 October 1921) was the Queen Mother of Ejisu within the Ashanti Empire, now part of modern-day Ghana. She was appointed by her brother Nana Akwasi Afrane Okese, the Ejisuhene, or Paramount Chief of Ejisu. In 1900, she led the War of the Golden Stool or the Yaa Asantewaa War against the British Empire.

== Biography ==
Yaa Asantewaa was born around 1840 in Besease, the daughter of Kwaku Ampoma and Ata Po. Her brother, Afrane Panin, became the chief of Edweso, a nearby community. After a childhood without incident, she cultivated crops on the land around Boankra. She entered a polygamous marriage with a man from Kumasi, with whom she had a daughter.

Asantewaa died in exile in the Seychelles in 1921. She was a successful farmer and mother. She was an intellectual, a politician, a human rights activist, a queen and a war leader. Yaa Asantewaa became famous for commanding the Ashanti Kings in the War of the Golden Stool, against British colonial rule, to defend and protect the sovereign independence of the Golden Stool.

== Prelude to rebellion ==
Yaa Asantewaa's older brother, Nana Akwasi Afrane Okpase was in a powerful position in the empire and selected Asantewaa as the Queen Mother. This was a prestigious position as she was responsible for protecting the golden stool, advising the King of Ashanti, and choosing candidates for the next king. During her brother's reign, Yaa Asantewaa saw the Ashanti Confederacy go through a series of events that threatened its future, including a civil war from 1883 to 1888. When her brother died in 1894, Yaa Asantewaa used her right as Queen Mother to nominate her own grandson as Ejisuhene. When the British exiled him to the Seychelles in 1896, along with the King of Asante Prempeh I and other members of the Asante government, Yaa Asantewaa became regent of the Ejisu–Juaben district. After the exile of Prempeh I, the British governor-general of the Gold Coast, Frederick Hodgson, demanded the Golden Stool, the symbol of the Asante nation. This request led to a secret meeting of the remaining members of the Asante government at Kumasi, to discuss how to secure the return of their king. There was a disagreement among those present on how to go about this. Yaa Asantewaa, who was present at this meeting, stood and addressed the members of the council with these words:

How can a proud and brave people like the Asante sit back and look while white men took away their king and chiefs, and humiliated them with a demand for the Golden Stool. The Golden Stool only means money to the whitemen; they have searched and dug everywhere for it. I shall not pay one predwan to the governor. If you, the chiefs of Asante, are going to behave like cowards and not fight, you should exchange your loincloths for my undergarments (Montu mo danta mma me na monnye me tam).

To dramatize her determination to go to war, Yaa Asantewaa seized a gun and fired a shot in front of the men.

Yaa Asantewaa was chosen by a number of regional Asante kings to be the war leader of the Asante fighting force. This is the first and only example of a woman being given that role in Asante history . Yaa Asantewaa inspired and rallied her people to fight back against the British during which she gave this speech:

Brave men of Ashanti, we are now faced with a serious confrontation by the Governor‘s extremely provocative request for the Golden Stool, which is the religious symbol of unity of the Ashanti nation. Not quite long ago the white man came and unilaterally occupied our God-given land and by force of arms has declared Ashanti Kingdom a British protectorate. We should also not forget that during the reign of King Karikari, the aggressors waged a senseless war on us, destroyed the seat of the Ashanti monarch and burnt our palace after looting all the treasures bequeathed to us by our fore father. Taking our brave men for a ride, the governor arbitrarily arrested and deported our King together with some prominent Chiefs of Ashanti without you men raising a finger. Today, he has come again to demand the Golden Stool. Gallant youth and men of our fatherland, shall we sit down to be dehumanized all the time by these rogues? We should rise and defend our heritage; it is better to perish than to look on sheepishly while the white man whose sole business in our country is to steal, kill and destroy, threatens to rob us of our Golden Stool. Arise men! And defend the Golden Stool from being captured by foreigners. It is more honorable to perish in defense of the Golden Stool than to remain in perpetual slavery. I am prepared and ready to lead you to war against the white man.

The traditional Ashanti military was revitalized by her passion to resist colonization. She questioned the male leader's response to British colonization. Yaa Asantewaa challenged gender roles and urged women to stand up to fight. The Ashanti-British War of the Golden Stool – also known as the "Yaa Asantewaa War" – was led by Queen Mother Nana Yaa Asantewaa with an army of 5,000.

== The rebellion and its aftermath ==
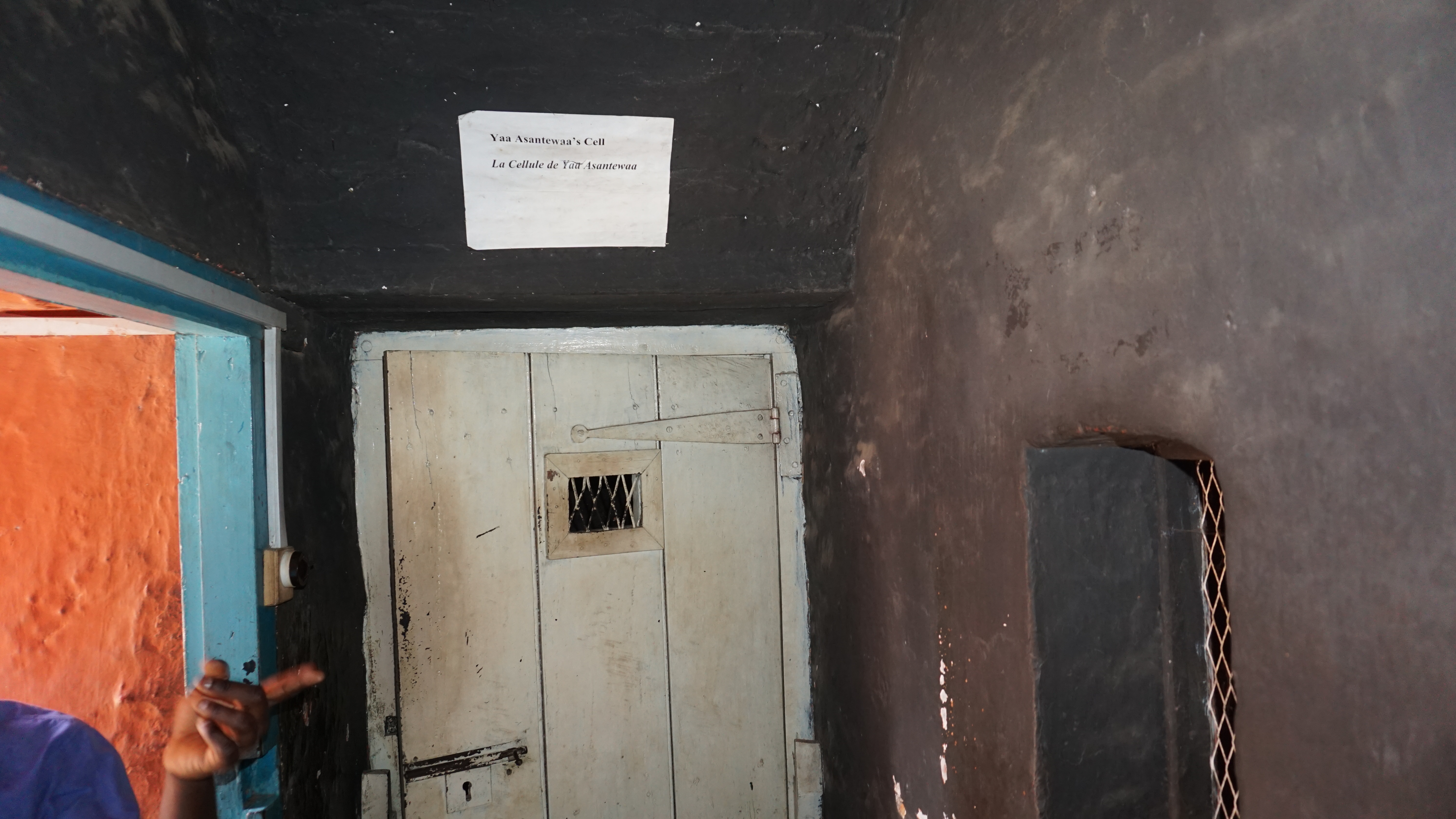
The room believed to be Nana Yaa Asantewaa's cell

Beginning in March 1900, the rebellion laid siege to the British fort at Kumasi, where they had sought refuge. The fort still stands today as the Kumasi Fort and Military Museum. After several months, the Gold Coast governor eventually sent a force of 1,400 to quell the rebellion. During the fighting, Queen Yaa Asantewaa and fifteen of her closest advisers—Nana Akwasi Afrane Okpase, Nana Kwaku Duah, Nana Yaw Akoto, Nana Abena Nkyinkyim, Nana Osei Tutu II, Nana Adjei Kwaku, Nana Afia Kobi Serwaa Ampem, Nana Kofi Kumi, Nana Kwabena Nkyinkyim, Nana Okwan Nkyinkyim, Nana Agyeman Badu, Nana Ntiamoah, Nana Ababio, Nana Afia Nkyinkyim, and Nana Osei Bonsu—were captured and sent into exile to the Seychelles, even though the specific names of her advisers are not extensively detailed in the available literature. The rebellion represented the final war in the series of Anglo-Asante wars that spanned the 19th century. In this confrontation, more than 2,000 Ashanti warriors lost their lives while approximately 1,000 British troops were also killed. This was the highest death toll from the Anglo-Asante wars and it lasted for 6 months. On 1 January 1902 the British finally annexed the territory that the Asante Empire had been controlling for almost a century, transforming the Asante into a protectorate of the British crown.

Fredrick Mitchell Hodgson required the Ashanti empire to sacrifice their ancient "golden stool" when they surrendered. The golden stool has been a revered symbol of the Ashanti nation's soul since the 17th century. The stool is 18 inches tall and 12 inches wide. It is never to be sat on but instead is placed next to the throne of the Ashanti king. Despite the British defeating the Ashanti army, the golden stool was never turned over. A fake golden stool was delivered to the British governor while the nation's symbol of freedom, the ancient golden stool was kept safely hidden. In 1920, a group of African railroad builders discovered the hidden golden stool and vandalized it. They were judged and sentenced to death by the Ashanti people. British authorities exiled the criminals from the Golden Coast colony before they were killed. British colonists agreed to not get involved with the Golden stool after realizing the significance of the object. The Golden Stool is still used today to initiate and crown the Asantehene (Ashanti ruler).

Nana Yaa Asantewaa died in exile in the Seychelles on 17 October 1921. Three years after her death, on 17 December 1924, King Prempeh I and the other remaining members of the exiled Asante court were allowed to return to Asante. King Prempeh I made sure that the remains of Nana Asantewaa and the other exiled Ashantis were returned for a proper royal burial. Queen Asantewaa's dream for an Asante independent from colonial rule was realized on 6 March 1957, when the Asante protectorate gained independence as part of Ghana. Ghana was the first African nation in West Africa to achieve this feat.

== Social roles of Asante women ==
Nana Yaa Asantewaa understood the ramifications of British colonial rule. She is seen by Ghanaians today as a queen mother who exercised her political and social right to help defend her kingdom. The role she played in influencing the Ashanti men to battle the British appears to be a function of her matriarchal status. The Ashanti people are organized in a matrilineal system, where lineage is traced through women who descend from a common female ancestor. The Ashanti believe a person's blood comes from the mother and spirit comes from the father. The queen mother was the sister of the chief and was the head of kinship relations. Yaa Asantewaa's status and warrior spirit led the Ashanti people during a time of uncertainty. Nana Yaa Asantewaa's call to the women of the Asante Empire is rooted in the political obligations of Akan women and their significant roles in legislative and judicial processes. The hierarchy of male stools among the Akan people was complemented by their female counterparts. Within the village, elders who were heads of the matrilineages (mpanyimfo), constituted the village council known as the ôdekuro. The women, known as the mpanyinfo, referred to as aberewa or ôbaa panyin, were responsible for looking after women's affairs. For every ôdekuro, an ôbaa panyin acted as the responsible party for the affairs of the women of the village and served as a member of the village council.

The head of a division, the ôhene, and the head of the autonomous political community, the Amanhene, had their female counterparts known as the ôhemaa: a female ruler who sat on their councils. The ôhemaa and ôhene were all of the same mogya, blood or localized matrilineage. The Asantehemaa, the occupant of the female stool in the Kumasi state, played a crucial role in the united Asante. As her male counterpart served as an ex-officio member of the Asantehene's council, she was also a member of the Kôtôkô Council, which acts as the executive committee or cabinet of the Asanteman Nhyiamu, the General Assembly of Asante rulers. Female stool occupants participated not only in the judicial and legislative processes, but also in the making and unmaking of war, and the distribution of land.

== Place in history and cultural legacy ==
Yaa Asantewaa remains a known figure in both Ashanti history and the broader history of Ghana for her role in confronting British colonialism. She is remembered in the song below:

Koo koo hin koo
Yaa Asantewaa ee!
Obaa basia
Ogyina apremo ano ee!
Waye be egyae
Na Wabo mmode
("Yaa Asantewaa
The woman who fights before cannons
You have accomplished great things
You have done well")

Yaa Asantewaa's legacy and memorials are a tourist attraction and revenue generator for Ghana. In 1999, 350,000 tourists came to the country and Ghana made $340 million in return. In 2000, the hundredth anniversary of the Yaa Asantewaa war, the Yaa Asantewaa festival was celebrated throughout Ghana. The festival included the Yaa Asantewaa Museum launch, an international conference, a women's convention, and a funeral service for Yaa Asantewaa's remains. The first lady of Ghana, Nana Konadu Rawling unveiled the Yaa Asantewaa museum alongside her daughters, continuing the matrilineage.

The museum features traditional Ashanti architecture and a house Yaa Asantewaa might have lived in. Dedications to the Ashanti culture are visited by locals and tourists. These attractions memorialize Yaa Asantewaa's legacy and bring people from all over the world together. Her legacy in Ghana holds pride for Ashante heritage. The effects of British colonization in Ghana are resisted by keeping Yaa Asantewaa's history alive.

To emphasize the importance of fostering female leadership in Ghanaian society, the Yaa Asantewaa Girls' Secondary School was established in Kumasi in 1960, funded by the Ghana Education Trust.

In the year 2000, a week-long centenary celebration was held in Ghana to acknowledge Yaa Asantewaa's accomplishments. As part of these celebrations, a museum was dedicated to her at Kwaso in the Ejisu–Juaben District on 3 August 2000. Unfortunately, a fire on 23 July 2004 destroyed several historical items, including her sandals and battle dress (batakarikese) seen in the photograph above. The current queen mother of Ejisu is Yaa Asantewaa II. A second Yaa Asantewaa festival was held 1–5 August 2006 in Ejisu.

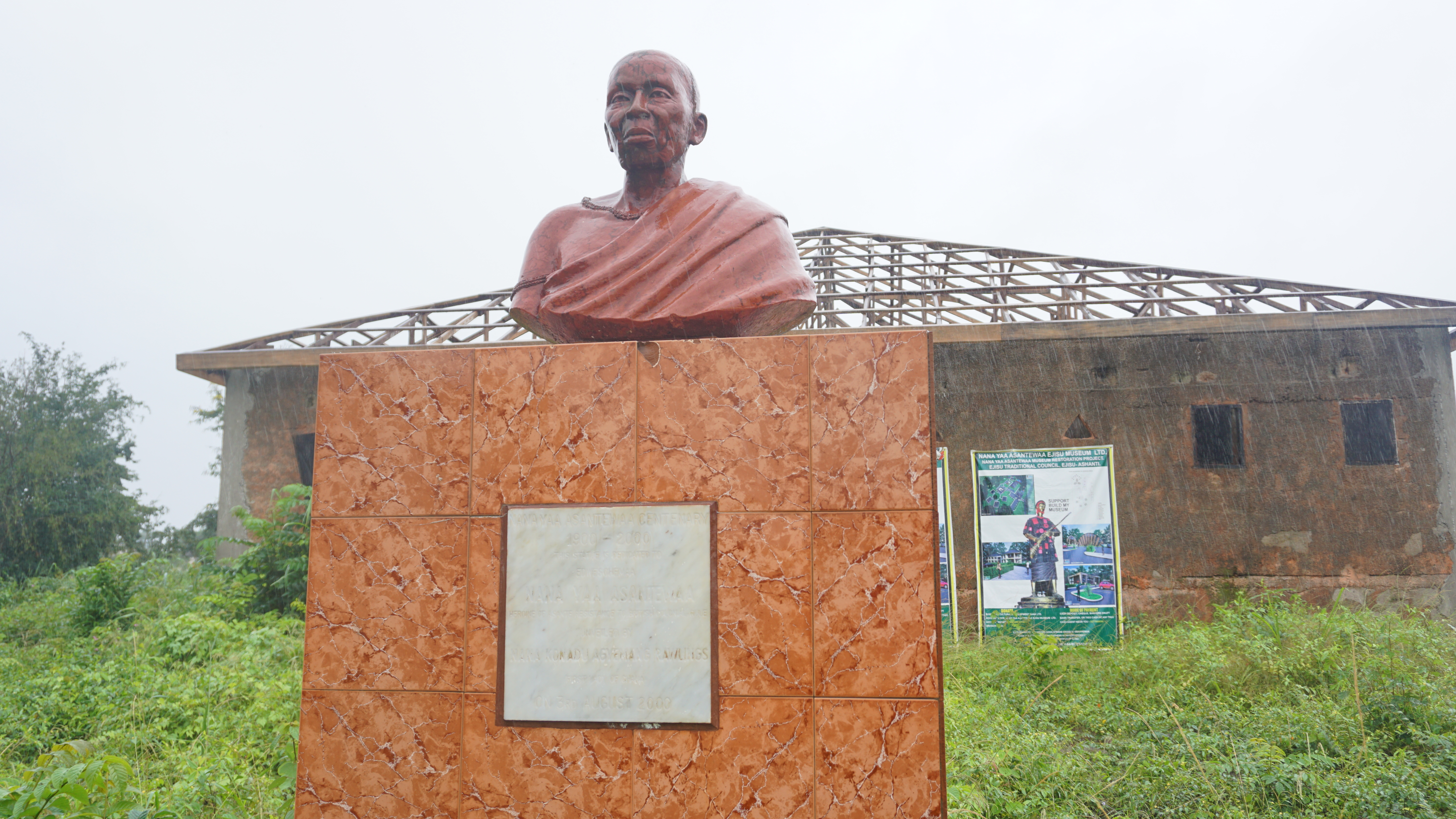
Yaa Asantewaa statue outside the fire-gutted museum

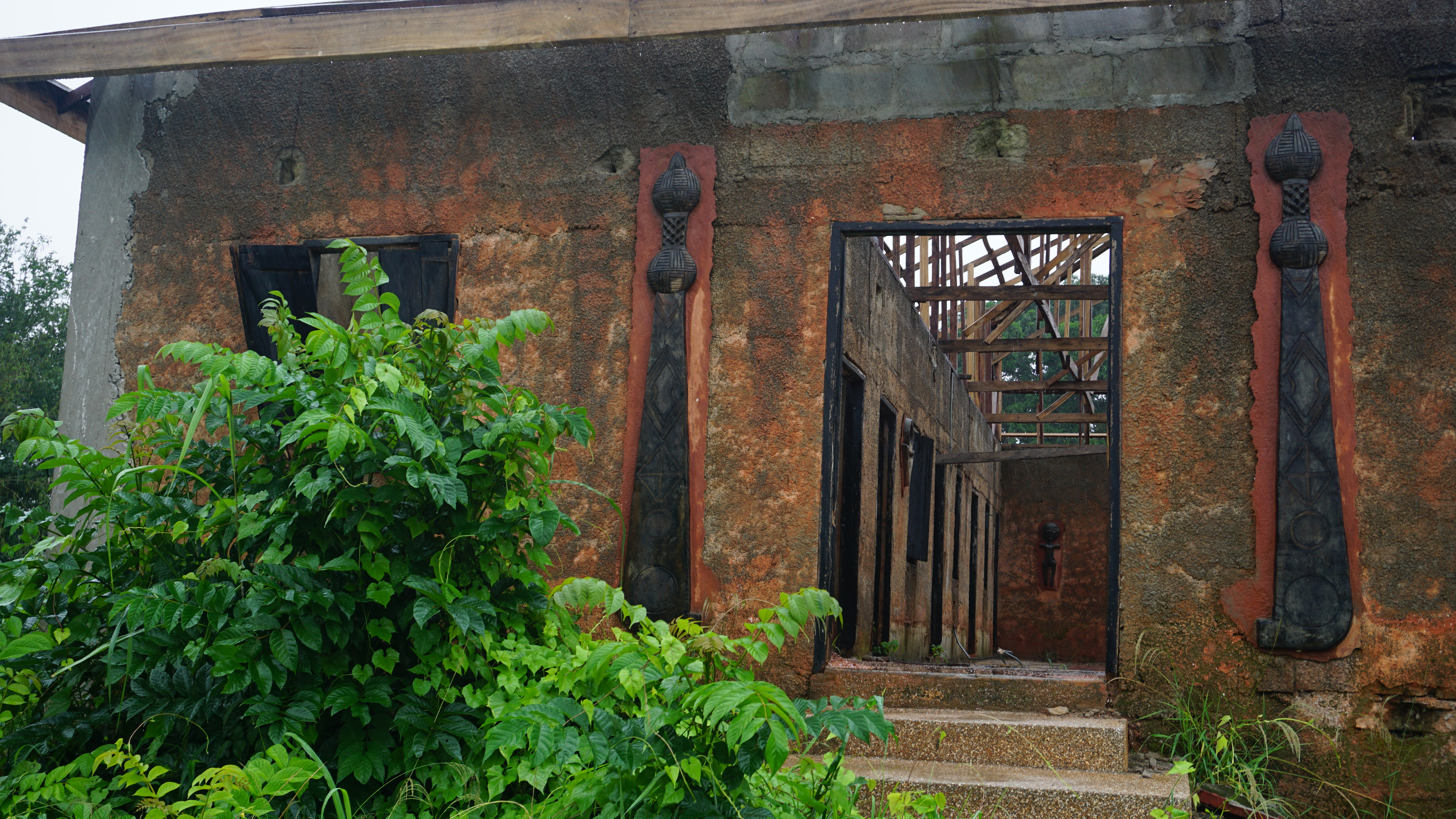
The burnt facade of the Yaa Asantewaa Museum

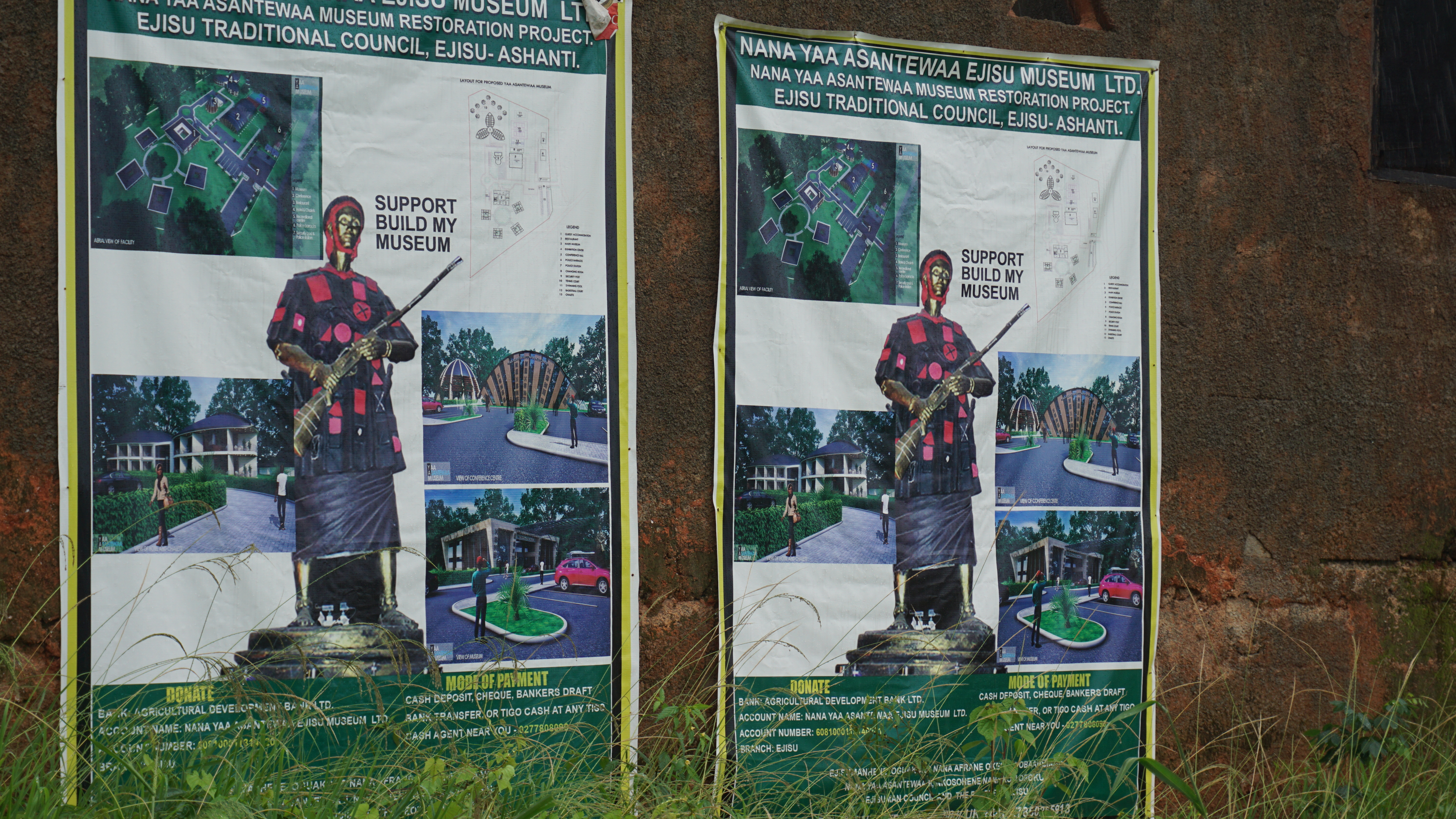
Recent calls to build a new Yaa Asantewaa Museum

The Yaa Asantewaa Centre in Maida Vale, west London, is an African–Caribbean arts and community center. It was established in 1986 and named after her. The center serves as a hub for cultural activities and community engagement, aiming to promote the arts and heritage of the African and Caribbean communities in the UK.

A television documentary by Ivor Agyeman-Duah, entitled Yaa Asantewaa – The Exile of King Prempeh and the Heroism of An African Queen, premiered in Ghana in 2001.

A stage show written by Margaret Busby, Yaa Asantewaa: Warrior Queen, directed by Geraldine Connor and featuring master drummer Kofi Ghanaba, with a pan-African cast, toured the UK and Ghana in 2001–02. A radio drama by the same author was also serialized in five episodes (13–17 October 2003) on BBC Radio Four's Woman's Hour, the cast including Glenna Forster-Jones and Jack Klaff, directed by Pam Fraser Solomon, narrated by Gbemisola Ikumelo, with music by Nana Tsiboe, Kofi-Adu, Jojo Yates, Asebre Quaye and Atongo Zimba.

The 2018 album from the British jazz troupe Sons of Kemet, Your Queen Is a Reptile, names songs after both contemporary and historical influential black women. Asantewaa's name was used for the seventh track, "My Queen is Yaa Asantewaa". Yaa Asantewaa is a worldwide recognized historic figure with contemporary value for women rights and freedom. In Germany, an award was named after her to honour strong women with African origins.

In 2024, the British Museum installed a 2014 painting called 'Yaa Asantewaa Inspecting the Dispositions at Ejisu' by the artist Kimathi Donkor in its Africa gallery.

== Festival ==
For details see Yaa Asantewaa Festival.

== See also ==
- Nanny of the Maroons
- Ana de Sousa Nzinga Mbande
- Matrilineality
- Ashanti Empire
- Gold Coast (British colony)
- Kwame Nkrumah
- War of the Golden Stool

== Bibliography ==
- Jefferson, A. W. (2016). Gold Coast Colony. In Facts on File (Ed.), World History: A Comprehensive Reference Set. Facts On File.
- Boahen, A. A., & Boahen, A. (2004). Ghana (Republic of): Colonization and Resistance, 1875–1901. In K. Shillington (Ed.), Encyclopedia of African History. Routledge.
- Harvey, Broxton, "Technological Resistance: West African Military Responses to European Imperialism, 1870–1914." Thesis, Georgia State University, 2020. doi:10.57709/18560950
- Ewusi, P. (2018, October 21). The Golden Stool (17th c.–). BlackPast.org.
- West, R. (2019, February 8). Yaa Asantewaa (mid-1800s–1921). BlackPast.org.
- Britannica, The Editors of Encyclopaedia. "Asante". Encyclopedia Britannica, 13 September 2023, . Accessed 11 November 2023.
- Day, Lynda R. "What’s Tourism Got to Do with It?: The Yaa Asantewa Legacy and Development in Asanteman." Africa Today, vol. 51, no. 1, 2004, pp. 99–113. JSTOR, . Accessed 11 November 2023.
