= Ama Pomaa Boateng =

Ghanaian politician

Hon. Ama Pomaa Boateng MP
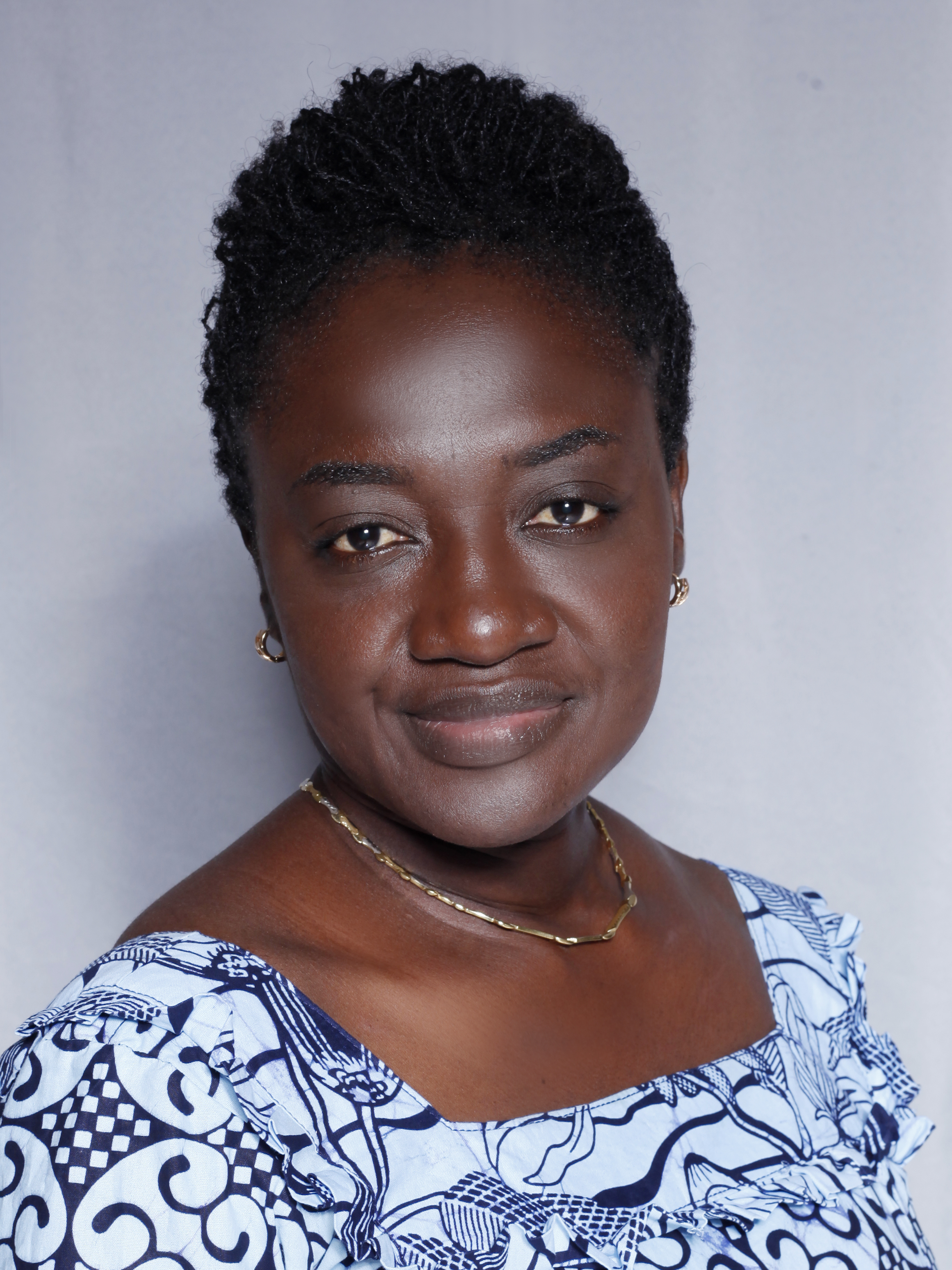

Member of Ghana Parliament for Juaben Constituency
- In office 7 January 2017 – 6 January 2025
- Succeeded by: Francis Kwabena B Owusu-Akyaw

Personal details
- Born: Ama Pomaa Andoh; 19 August 1975 (age 51) Juaben, Ghana
- Party: New Patriotic Party
- Children: 1
- Education: Westminster University, London, Uk
- Occupation: IT Consultant
- Profession: IT Consultant
- Cabinet: Minister
- Committees: Gender and Children Committee; Food, Agriculture and Cocoa Affairs Committee

Ama Pomaa Boateng (born 19 August 1975) is a Ghanaian politician and IT Consultant . She was the member of parliament for the Juaben Constituency in the Ashanti Region of Ghana and represented the New Patriotic Party.

== Early life and education ==
Ama Pomaa was born on 19 August 1975 in Juaben, Ashanti Region. She had her senior high school education at the Holy Child School in Cape Coast and earned a master's degree in information studies from Anglia Ruskin University. Ama holds a certificate in computing from Westminster University in London, UK. In 2012 she acquired a certificate in e-waste from the United Nations e-waste Academy. She also holds certificates from Penn Foster, Wild PCS, Harvard University and House of Democracy Partnership/ NDI.

== Career ==
Ama Pomaa is an IT consultant by profession and the executive director for Ghanaian High-tech Women in Accra, an NGO in IT training. She serves as the co-chair of Ghana’s eParliament /ICT Steering Committee. Ama is a board member of the National Petroleum Authority in Ghana, where she serves as the Chairperson of the Complaints and Settlements Subcommittee.

== Politics ==
Ama Pomaa contested and won the parliamentary seat for the Juaben Constituency in the Ashanti Region during the 2016 Ghanaian general elections. Three other candidates, namely Nana Prempeh Amankwaah of the National Democratic Congress, and Gallo Stephen Ayitey of the Conventions Peoples Party also contested in the 2016 by-election of the Juaben Constituency held on 7 December 2016. She won the election by obtaining 22,323 votes out of the 29,606 cast, representing 75.40 percent of total valid votes.

In the parliamentary primaries of 2024 for the NPP, she was defeated in her attempt to represent the party by Francis K.B Owusu-Akyaw. Owusu secured 334 votes, surpassing his opponent who received 120 votes out of the total valid votes cast.

=== Committees ===
Ama Pomaa is member of Gender and Children Committee and also a member of Food, Agriculture and Cocoa Affairs Committee.

== Foundation ==
Through her foundation, she ran a Cisco Networking Academy program for young women.

== Personal life ==
Ama Pomaa is married with one child. She is also a Christian.
