= Yaa Asantewaa Festival =

Festival in Ghana to remember Yaa Asantewaa

The Yaa Asantewaa Festival is an annual festival celebrated by the chiefs and people of the Ejisu Traditional Area in the Ashanti Region of Ghana. It is usually celebrated in the month of August.

The Yaa Asantewaa festival was founded by the Royal House of Queen Mother Saa Pogh Naa Yaa Asantewaa Ababio II to remember the 95th Year of the Home Calling of Queen Yaa Asantewaa and to honor her actions during the War of the Golden Stool.

The nine-day festival also pays respect to Queen Mother Yaa Akyaa, Mother of King Nana Prempeh, and all of the other kings and chiefs who were exiled to the Seychelles by the British in the early 1900s. These included the Sultan of Perak Abdullah Muhammad Shah II of Perak, the King of Buganda Mwanga II of Buganda and the King of Bunyoro Chwa II Kabalega Other notable political exiles were, Makarios III, the first President of the Republic of the Seychelles, and Saad Zaghloul, the 17th Prime Minister of Egypt.

== Celebrations ==
In Ejisu Kumasi, there is a durbar of chiefs, which is presided over by the paramount chief of Ejisu.

In the Seychelles, a special memorial ceremony was organized on October 17, 2016, to mark the 95th anniversary of the passing of Yaa Asantewaa (who passed in the Seychelles on October 17, 1921). The memorial ceremony was organized by the Office of the Reincarnation Successor Saa Pogh Naa Yaa Asantewaa Ababio II of the Tano Yaw (UNESCO) world heritage listed shrine in Ejisu, Ghana, sponsored by Ethiopian Airlines, in collaboration with the Seychelles ministry responsible for culture along with the National Archives.

Also in the Seychelles, there is an exhibition, entitled Saint Yaa Asantewaa Memorial Exhibition, that was reported by the Seychelles Nations as being a special exhibition. It was officially opened on October 21, 2016, at the National History Museums by Queen Yaa Asantewaa's Reincarnation Successor, Queen Mother Saa Pogh Naa, to mark the 95th anniversary of the passing of legendary fearless warrior Queen Mother Nana Yaa Asantewaa of Ghana, who died in the Seychelles on October 17, 1921.

== Significance ==
The chiefs and the inhabitants of Ejisu pay homage to Yaa Asantewaa, who was known as an Ashanti war heroine who led a battle against the British in 1901. The festival also commemorates her bravery for resisting the British from capturing the Golden Stool of the Ashantis, which led to an uprising in the late 1690s.
