= Akwasi Osei-Adjei =

Ghanaian politician

Hon. Akwasi Osei-Adjei

Member of Parliament for Ejisu-Juaben Constituency
- In office 7 January 1997 – 6 January 2009
- President: John Kufuor
- Preceded by: Mohammed Boakye Agyemang
- Succeeded by: Kwabena Owusu Aduomi

Personal details
- Born: 27 December 1949 (age 76)
- Party: New Patriotic Party

Akwasi Osei-Adjei (born 27 December 1949) is a Ghanaian politician of the Republic of Ghana. He was the Member of Parliament representing Ejisu-Juaben constituency of the Ashanti Region of Ghana in the 4th Parliament of the 4th Republic of Ghana. He is a member of the New Patriotic Party.

== Political career ==
Osei-Adjei is a member of the New Patriotic Party. He became a member of parliament from January 2005 after emerging winner in the General Election in December 2005. He has since then had a run of five consecutive terms in office. He was the MP for Ejisu-Juaben constituency. He was the Minister of Foreign Affairs from July 2007 to February 2009. He became the Deputy Minister for Trade and Industry from April 2003.

== Elections ==
Osei-Adjei was first elected into Parliament as a member of the Ejisu-Juaben Constituency in the Ashanti Region of Ghana during the 1996 Ghanaian General Elections with 34,521 votes out of the 45,648 valid votes cast representing 63.20%.

Osei-Adjei was elected as the member of parliament for the Ejisu-Juaben constituency of the Ashanti Region of Ghana in the 2000 Ghanaian general elections. He won on the ticket of the New Patriotic Party. His constituency was a part of the 31 parliamentary seats out of 33 seats won by the New Patriotic Party in that election for the Ashanti Region 33,128 votes out of 42,605 total valid votes cast. This is equivalent to 78.8% of total valid votes cast. He was elected over Adamu B. Jibreel of the Peoples’ National Convention, Kwasi Adusei of the National Democratic Congress, George M. Osei of the National Reformed Party and Kwasi Baidoo of the Convention People's Party. These obtained 7,262, 829, 422 and 420 votes respectively of the total votes cast. These are equivalent to 17.3%, 2%, 1% and 1% respectively of total valid votes cast.

Osei-Adjei was elected as the member of parliament for the Ejisu-Juaben constituency of the Ashanti Region of Ghana in the 2004 Ghanaian general elections. He won on the ticket of the New Patriotic Party. His constituency was a part of the 36 parliamentary seats out of 39 seats won by the New Patriotic Party in that election for the Ashanti Region. The New Patriotic Party won a majority total of 128 parliamentary seats out of 230 seats. He was elected with 50,396 votes out of 64,459 total valid votes cast. This is equivalent to 62.9% of total valid votes cast. He was elected over Kaba Abraham Hirohito Younti of the Peoples’ National Convention, Anima Wilson of the National Democratic Congress and Kwasi Baidoo of the Convention People's Party. These obtained 1,375, 11,058 and 1,630 votes respectively of the total votes cast. These are equivalent to 2.1%, 17.2% and 2.5% respectively of total valid votes cast.

== See also ==
- List of MPs elected in the 2004 Ghanaian parliamentary election
