= Eunice Ohenewaa Ansu =

Ghanaian politician (born 1977)

Hon Eunice Ohenewaa Ansu

Municipal Chief Executive of Juaben Municipal Assembly
- Incumbent
- Assumed office 2025
- Appointed by: President of Ghana

Personal details
- Born: 30 June 1977 (age 49) Juaben, Ashanti Region, Ghana
- Party: National Democratic Congress
- Spouse: Alhaji Gariba Ibrahim
- Children: 3 children; two boys and a girl
- Education: Sunyani Technical University; Baptist University; Kwame Nkrumah University of Science and Technology

Eunice Ohenewaa Ansu (born 30 June 1977) is a Ghanaian public servant and politician. She is the current Municipal Chief Executive (MCE) of the Juaben Municipal Assembly in the Ashanti Region of Ghana. She was appointed to the position in 2025 and is the first woman to hold the position of Chief Executive in the municipality since its inception. Ansu is married to Alhaji Gariba Ibrahim with whom they have three children; two boys and a girl.

== Early life and education ==
Ansu hails from Juaben in the Ashanti Region. She is the last in a family of three, born to Alfred Prince Tawiah, a military officer, and Beatrice Bekoe Boateng, a businesswoman.

She began her education at the Sunyani Ridge Experimental School but completed her basic education at the Tamale Zogbeli Junior High School in 1993. She read business at Sunyani Senior High School and completed in 1996. She then pursued an Accountancy Diploma at the Sunyani Polytechnic, now known as the Sunyani Technical University, and completed in 2003. She also undertook a Bachelor of Arts in marketing at Baptist University and later pursued a Master of Business Administration in Marketing at the Kwame Nkrumah University of Science and Technology in 2019.

== Career ==
Her first professional assignment was in 2004 at the Electoral Commission in Sunyani, where she worked as a National Service staff. She later worked at the National Investment Bank (NIB), as a Customer Service Officer for the Suame branch. Ansu rose to become the Corporate Relationship Manager at the Sunyani branch of NIB in 2019.

=== Political career ===
Ansu entered politics in 2018, working as a Branch Executive for the National Democratic Congress (NDC). In 2022, she became an NDC Constituency Executive for the Juaben Constituency. Having gathered enough experience, she contested for the 2024 general elections, working as the Parliamentary Candidate for Juaben Constituency.

On 19 May 2025, Ansu was appointed by H.E. John Dramani Mahama and confirmed as the Municipal Chief Executive (MCE) for Juaben Constituency, with 24 "Yes" votes and 1 "No" vote from a total of 25 Assembly members. She was sworn into office by Judge Rosemarie Afua-Asante, a judge of the Juaben Circuit Court.

== Initiatives and administration ==
As the MCE of Juaben Constituency, Ansu has focused on several key development areas;

=== Agriculture ===
She launched the "Nkoko Nkitikiti" poultry initiative, which distributed 10,000 birds to local farmers in January 2026 in order to boost local production and food security.

=== Education ===
Ansu has prioritized improving educational infrastructure, which includes the donation of white marker boards to schools such as Abetenim KG, Primary and Junior High Schools (JHS) to enhance teaching.

=== Environmental protection ===
She has taken a firm stance against illegal mining (galamsey) forming a task force in collaboration with the Ghana Police Service and the traditional authorities to protect forest reserves and water bodies.

=== Public Safety ===
Ansu is spearheading the cause of public safety in her constituency. She appealed for the re-demarcation of the police jurisdictions to better combat armed robbery attacks in areas such as Nobewam-Bomfa.
