= Sasabobirim Festival =

Festival in Ghana by the people of Awuah

Sasabobirim Festival is an annual festival celebrated by the chiefs and people of Awuah-Domase Traditional Area near Sunyani in the Bono Region, formerly Brong Ahafo Region of Ghana. It is usually celebrated in the month of November. Others also claim it is celebrated in September.

== Celebrations ==
During the festival, visitors are welcomed to share food and drinks. The people put on traditional clothes and there is durbar of chiefs. There is also dancing and drumming.

== Significance ==
This festival is celebrated to mark an event that took place in the past. This festival is in the remembrance of the a chief who joined Yaa Asantewaa to fight the Europeans.
