= Francis Kwabena B Owusu-Akyaw =

Ghanaian politician

Hon. Francis Kwabena B. Owusu-Akyaw MP

Member of the Ghana Parliament for Juaben
- Incumbent
- Assumed office 7 January 2025
- Preceded by: Ama Pomaa Boateng
- President: John Dramani Mahama
- Vice President: Jane Naana Opoku-Agyemang

Personal details
- Born: 30 June 1979 (age 47) Juaben, Ghana
- Party: New Patriotic Party
- Education: School of Mines; KNUST; University of Ghana; GIMPA–KAAF
- Occupation: Politician
- Profession: Geologist

Francis Kwabena Berepong Owusu-Akyaw (born 30 June 1979) is a Ghanaian politician, minerals consultant, and Member of Parliament for the Juaben Constituency in the Ashanti Region. He represents the New Patriotic Party (NPP) in the Ninth Parliament of the Fourth Republic of Ghana.

== Early life and education ==
Owusu-Akyaw was born on 30 June 1979, in Juaben, Ashanti Region. He earned a Certificate of Proficiency from the School of Mines in July 2004. In June 2020, he graduated with a Bachelor of Science from Kwame Nkrumah University of Science and Technology (KNUST), followed by a Master of Science from the University of Ghana in July 2021, and an LL.B. from GIMPA–KAAF University College in June 2022.

== Career ==
=== Politics ===
Owusu-Akyaw entered national politics with the 2024 general election, where he won the Juaben parliamentary seat, defeating his NDC rival Eunice Ansu with 21,168 to 8,421 votes As part of his legislative duties, he serves on the Lands and Natural Resources Committee as well as the Standing Orders Committee, contributing to discussions and decisions related to land administration, resource governance, and parliamentary procedures.
