= Murder of Cloete and Thomas Murray =

2023 murders in South Africa

The murder of Cloete and Thomas Murray refers to the fatal shooting of South African insolvency practitioner Cloete Murray and his son Thomas (Tom) Murray on 18 March 2023 on the N1 highway in Midrand, Gauteng. The case attracted significant national attention due to the high profile of Cloete Murray's work in insolvency, including cases linked to the controversial state contractor Bosasa and the Guptas.

== Background ==
Cloete Murray was an established insolvency practitioner and liquidator who was appointed by the High Court to oversee complex insolvency matters, including the winding up of companies entangled in corruption and financial irregularities. His son, Thomas, worked as a legal adviser at his firm, Sechaba Trust.

== Incident ==
On 18 March 2023, Cloete and Thomas Murray were traveling in a vehicle on the N1 highway near Midrand when gunmen opened fire on their car. Thomas Murray was fatally shot at the scene, while Cloete sustained multiple gunshot wounds and was transported to the hospital, where he died the following day. The South African Police Service confirmed that two murder cases were being investigated. Cloete Murray was central to investigations into Gupta-linked companies and other state capture entities, including Bosasa. It is suspected that Cloete and Thomas were murdered because they had started to unearth evidence that siblings Rushil and Nishani Singh—with whom they spent their final hours—had allegedly built a multi-million dollar empire in Ghana on a series of lies and bribes. The Singhs had secured a handful of road and hospital construction contracts, worth at least $54.1m, and maintained favor by paying at least $2.7m in bribes to influential politicians in that country. The contracts, awarded between 2015 and 2019, were for the rehabilitation and construction of more than 100 km of roads and storm drains, as well as construction work on several hospitals as a subcontractor. Their business, Ghana Infrastructure Company (GIC), was paid the equivalent of $18.4m for work completed between September 2017 and November 2022. The Singhs were arrested and charged with defrauding Investec Bank of 178 million using a fraudulent bank guarantee. Nishani Sing died in custody in October 2024 while awaiting trial for her alleged role in a R150 million fraud case involving forged Stanbic Bank Ghana guarantees.

== Reactions ==
The murders prompted widespread condemnation and calls for justice. The National Union of Metalworkers of South Africa (NUMSA) expressed shock at the killings and urged the police to find those responsible. The South African Restructuring and Insolvency Practitioners’ Association (SARIPA) called for heightened safety for practitioners and stressed that such professionals must be able to work without fear, while the civil society group Freedom Under Law described the killings as threatening to the rule of law and constitutional democracy. A non-profit organization, Justice For Forensics, offered a reward of R1 million for information that could lead to the arrest and conviction of those behind the murders. One of those implicated was Ghana's former Deputy Roads Minister Kwabena Owusu Aduomi.

== Investigation ==
Police investigations into the murders have been ongoing, with concerns raised about delays in progress. In 2025, the Chairperson of the Parliamentary Portfolio Committee on Police, Ian Cameron, criticized the South African Police Service for not acting on key leads, including possible third suspects identified on CCTV footage.

== Legacy ==
The murders of Cloete and Thomas Murray have been referenced in discussions about the safety of professionals involved in financial investigations and corruption cases in South Africa. Subsequent cases, such as the murder of Bouwer van Niekerk, an insolvency practitioner in 2025, have been framed by some commentators as highlighting broader issues of intimidation against legal and financial investigators.

== See also ==
- Bosasa
- Babita Deokaran
