= Ashanti (Crown Colony) =

British Crown Colony from 1902 until 1957

- 1902–1957
- Flag
- Anthem: God Save the King (1902–1952); God Save the Queen (1952–1957)
- Map of the Gold Coast Colony, the Ashanti Colony, the Northern Territories and the mandate territory of British Togoland
- Status: British colony
- Capital: Kumasi
- Common languages: English (official) Asante Twi(official)
- Religion: Christianity, Islam, traditional African religion
- Chief Commissioner
  - 1902-1904: Donald William Stewart
  - 1956-1957: Arthur Colin Russell
- History
  - Colony established: 1 January 1902
  - Independence as part of the dominion named Ghana: 6 March 1957
- Currency: Gold Coast ackey British West African pound
Preceded by	Succeeded by
Ashanti Empire	Dominion of Ghana
- Today part of: Ghana

Ashanti was a British Crown Colony in West Africa from 1902 until its independence as part of the Dominion of Ghana in 1957. After several prior wars with British troops, Ashanti was once again occupied by British troops in January 1896. In 1900, the Ashanti Uprising took place. The British suppressed the violence and captured the city of Kumasi. Ashanti's king, the Asanthene, and his counselors were deported. The outcome was the annexation of Ashanti by the British so that it became part of His Majesty's dominions and a British Crown Colony with its administration undertaken by a Chief Commissioner under the authority of the Governor of the Gold Coast. Ashanti was classed as a colony by conquest. The legislation by which this annexation was effected and the administration constituted was the Ashanti Order in Council 1901 made on 26 September of that same year.

The Ashanti lost their sovereignty but not the essential integrity of their socio-political system. In 1935, limited self-determination for the Ashanti was officially regularized in the formal establishment of the Ashanti Confederacy. Ashanti continued to be administered with the greater Gold Coast but remained, nonetheless, a separate Crown Colony until it became united as part of the new dominion named Ghana under the Ghana Independence Act 1957.
