= Juaben Municipal Assembly =

- Municipal Municipal
- Districts of Ashanti Region

- Location of Juaben Municipal Assembly in Ghana
- Coordinates: 6°49′N 1°26′W
- Country: Ghana
- Region: Ashanti
- Capital: Juaben

Area
  - Total: 372 km^{2} (144 sq mi)

Population (2021)
  - Total: 63,929
  - Density: 172/km^{2} (445/sq mi)
- Time zone: UTC+0 (GMT)

Juaben Municipal is one of the forty-three districts in Ashanti Region, Ghana. Originally it was formerly part of the then-larger Ejisu-Juaben Municipal District in 1988, which was created from the former Ejisu-Juaben-Bosomtwe District Council, until the northeast part of the district was split off to create Juaben Municipal District on 15 March 2018; thus the remaining part has been renamed as Ejisu Municipal. The municipality is located in the central part of Ashanti Region and has Juaben as its capital town.

== Leadership ==
The current MCE for the municipality is Eunice Ohenewaa Ansu.

== Sources ==
- "Districts of Ghana". Statoids.
- GhanaDistricts.com
