= Ejisu (Ghana parliament constituency) =

Constituency in the Ashanti Region of Ghana

- constituency for the Parliament of Ghana
- District: Sekyere East District
- Region: Ashanti Region of Ghana

Current constituency
- Party: New Patriotic Party
- MP: Kwabena Boateng

Ejisu formerly Ejisu-Juaben is one of the constituencies represented in the Parliament of Ghana. It elects one Member of Parliament (MP) by the first past the post system of election. Ejisu is located in the Ejisu-Juaben Municipal District of the Ashanti Region of Ghana.

== Members of Parliament ==
First elected	Member	Party
First Republic
Ejisu
1965	Jantuah Francis Adubobi	Convention People's Party
Second Republic
Ejisu-Juaben
1969	Kwame Agyei Boaitey	Progress Party
Third Republic
1979	John Emmanuel Amoah	Popular Front Party
Fourth Republic
1992	Mohammed Boakye Agyemang	National Democratic Congress
1996	Akwasi Osei-Adjei	New Patriotic Party
2008	Kwabena Owusu Aduomi	New Patriotic Party
Ejisu
2012	Kwabena Owusu Aduomi	New Patriotic Party
2020	John Ampotuah Kumah	New Patriotic Party
2024	Kwabena Boateng	New Patriotic Party

== Elections ==
2024 By-election: Ejisu
Party	Candidate	Votes	%	±%
New Patriotic Party	Kwabena Boateng	27,782	55.79	−27.04
Independent	Kwaku Owusu Aduomi	21,536	43.24	—
Independent	Joseph Agyeman Fredua	222	0.45	—
Liberal Party of Ghana	Beatrice Boakye	149	0.30	—
Convention People's Party	Esther Osei	89	0.18	—
Independent	Joseph Attakora	23	0.05	—
Majority		5,246	12.55	−53.11
Turnout		50,218	47.02	—
Registered electors				

2020 Ghanaian general election: Ejisu Source: Ghanaweb
Party	Candidate	Votes	%	±%
New Patriotic Party	John Ampotuah Kumah	68,326	82.83	+0.5
National Democratic Congress	George Kwame Huze	14,164	17.17	+1.87
Majority		54,162	65.66	—
Turnout		82,490		

2008 Ghanaian parliamentary election: Ejisu-Juaben Source: Ghana Home Page
Party	Candidate	Votes	%	±%
New Patriotic Party	Kwabena Owusu Aduomi	57,278	82.3	—
National Democratic Congress	Anima Wilson	10,635	15.3	—
Convention People's Party	James Sarfo-Ansah	1,102	1.6	—
People's National Convention	Lucy Kapapoe	544	0.8	—
Majority		3,354	63.6	—
Turnout				

== See also ==
- List of Ghana Parliament constituencies
