= Juaben (Ghana parliament constituency) =

Constituency in the Ashanti Region of Ghana

- constituency for the Parliament of Ghana
- District: Ejisu-Juaben Municipal District
- Region: Ashanti Region of Ghana

Current constituency
- Party: New Patriotic Party
- MP: Francis Kwabena B Owusu-Akyaw

Juaben is one of the constituencies represented in the Parliament of Ghana. It was created out of the Ejisu-Juaben Constituency in 2012. Francis Kwabena B. Owusu-Akyaw is the member of parliament for the constituency. Juaben is located in the Ejisu-Juaben Municipal District of the Ashanti Region of Ghana.

== list of Member of Parliament ==
Election	Members	Party	Ref
1996			
2000			
2004			
2008			
2012	Ama P. Andoh	New Patriotic Party	
2016	Ama Pomaa Boateng	New Patriotic Party	
2020	Ama Pomaa Boateng	New Patriotic Party	
2024	Francis Kwabena Berepong Owusu-Akyaw	New Patriotic Party	

== See also ==
- List of Ghana Parliament constituencies
