= War of the Golden Stool =

1900 war between UK and Ashanti Empire

- Part of the Anglo-Ashanti Wars
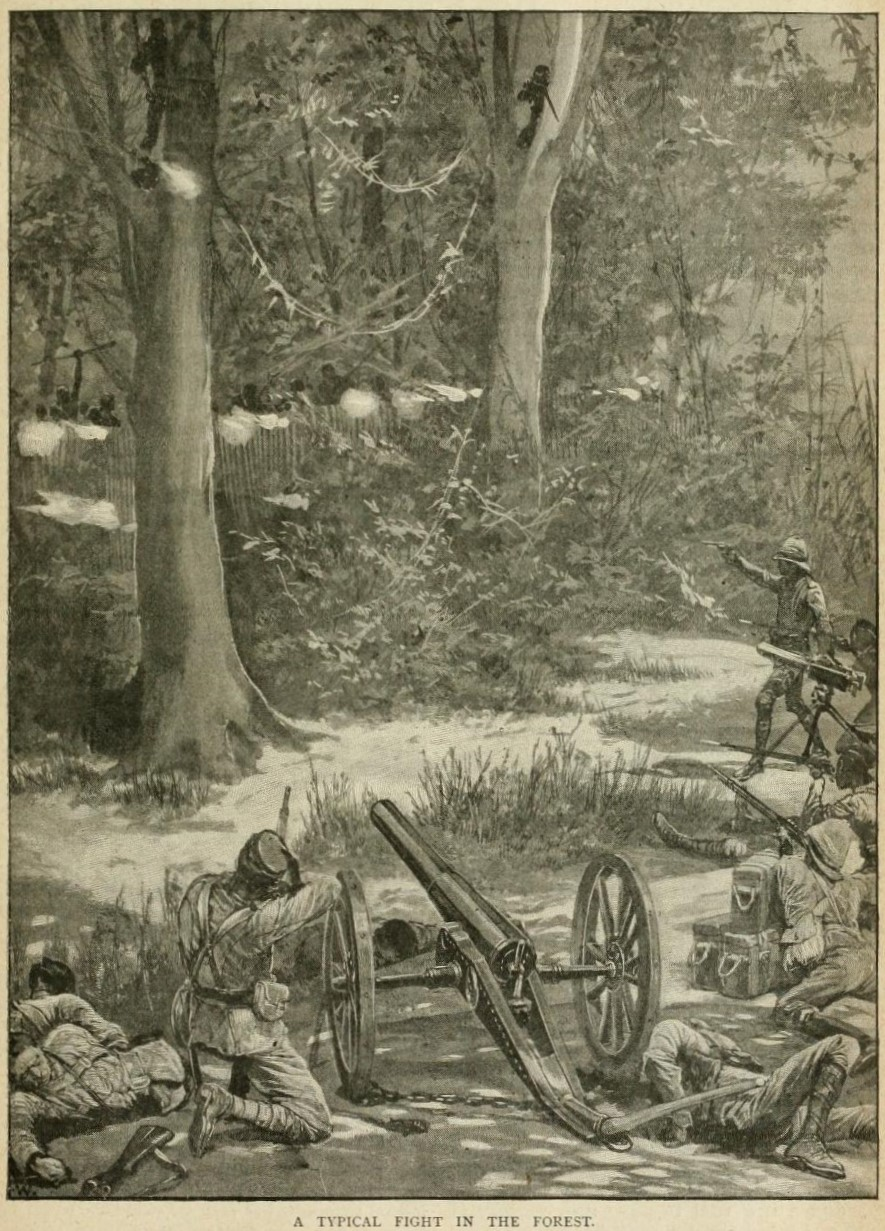
- Typical fight in the forest, Anglo-Ashanti War of 1900 (Battles of the nineteenth century, 1901)
Date	March – September 1900
Location	Ashanti (present-day Ghana)
Result	British military victory Ashanti Symbolic victory: Capture of Yaa Asentawaa and banishment to the Seychelles; Ashanti territories become part of Gold Coast colony in 1902; Ashanti retain control of the Golden Stool

Belligerents
British Empire	Ashanti Empire

Commanders and leaders
Frederick Mitchell Hodgson; James Willcocks	Yaa Asantewaa; Prempeh I

Strength
Unknown	20,000

Casualties and losses
1,070 casualties	2000

The War of the Golden Stool, also known as the Yaa Asantewaa War, the Third Ashanti Expedition, the Ashanti Uprising, or variations thereof, was a campaign in 1900 during the series of conflicts between the United Kingdom and the Ashanti Empire (later Ashanti Region), an autonomous state in West Africa that fractiously co-existed with the British and its vassal coastal tribes.

After several prior wars with British troops, Ashanti was once again occupied by British troops in January 1896. In 1900 the Ashanti staged an uprising. The British suppressed the revolt and captured the city of Kumasi. Ashanti's traditional king, the Asantehene, and his counselors were deported. The outcome was the annexation of Ashanti by the British so that it became part of His Majesty's dominions and a British Crown Colony with its administration undertaken by a Chief Commissioner under the authority of the Governor of the Gold Coast. Ashanti was classed as a colony by conquest. The Ashanti lost their sovereignty but not the essential integrity of their socio-political system. In 1935, limited self-determination for the Ashanti was officially regularized in the formal establishment of the Ashanti Confederacy. The Crown Colony of Ashanti continued to be administered in a scheme with the greater Gold Coast but remained, nonetheless, a separate Crown Colony until it became united as part of the new dominion named Ghana under the Ghana Independence Act 1957.

== The Golden Stool ==
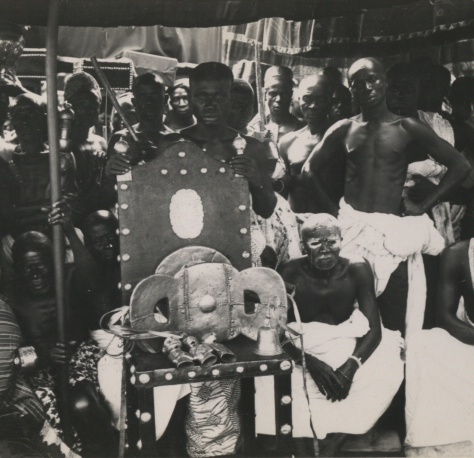
An The Golden Stool in 1935

The Golden Stool had long symbolized governing power for the Ashanti people.

On 19 March 1901 British statesman David Lloyd George stated in a Parliamentary session that: "Frederick Hodgson's quest of the Golden Stool was something like the quest of the Holy Grail". The Member of Parliament of Caernarfon as well as other members of the House were extremely concerned about the huge expense that the House was being made to pay for the war. Joseph Chamberlain, then Secretary for the Colonial Office, was questioned extensively as to whether or not Frederick Hodgson had actually been given prior permission to demand the Golden Stool from the Asante people, because he seemed to think that "if he could only get possession of the Golden Stool he would be able to govern the country for all time".

Hodgson advanced toward Kumasi with a small force of British soldiers and local levies, arriving on 25 March 1900. Hodgson, as representative of a powerful nation, was accorded traditional honors upon entering the city with children singing "God Save the Queen" to Lady Hodgson. After ascending a platform, he made a speech to the assembled Ashanti leaders. The speech, or the closest surviving account that comes through an Ashanti translator, reportedly read:

Your King Prempeh I is in exile and will not return to Ashanti. His power and authority will be taken over by the Representative of the Queen of Britain. The terms of the 1874 Peace Treaty of Fomena, which required you to pay for the cost of the 1874 war, have not been forgotten. You have to pay with interest the sum of £160,000 a year. Then there is the matter of the Golden Stool of Ashanti. The Queen is entitled to the stool; she must receive it.

Where is the Golden Stool? I am the representative of the Paramount Power. Why have you relegated me to this ordinary chair? Why did you not take the opportunity of my coming to Kumasi to bring the Golden Stool for me to sit upon? However, you may be quite sure that though the Government has not received the Golden Stool at his hands it will rule over you with the same impartiality and fairness as if you had produced it.

The speech was received in silence by the assembly, but the chiefs that were present began war preparations upon their return to their homes. In his book The Golden Stool: Some Aspects of the Conflict of Cultures in Modern Africa the anthropologist Reverend Edwin W. Smith wrote of this: "A singularly foolish speech! An excellent example of the blunders that are made through ignorance of the African mind!" Gaurav Desai quotes this passage and goes on to clarify that the Stool was not seen as a mere physical object and symbol of power but as a metaphysical and spiritual representation of the soul of the Ashanti people as a whole – this misunderstanding being the catalyst for the conflict, coming at a time of already strained relations.

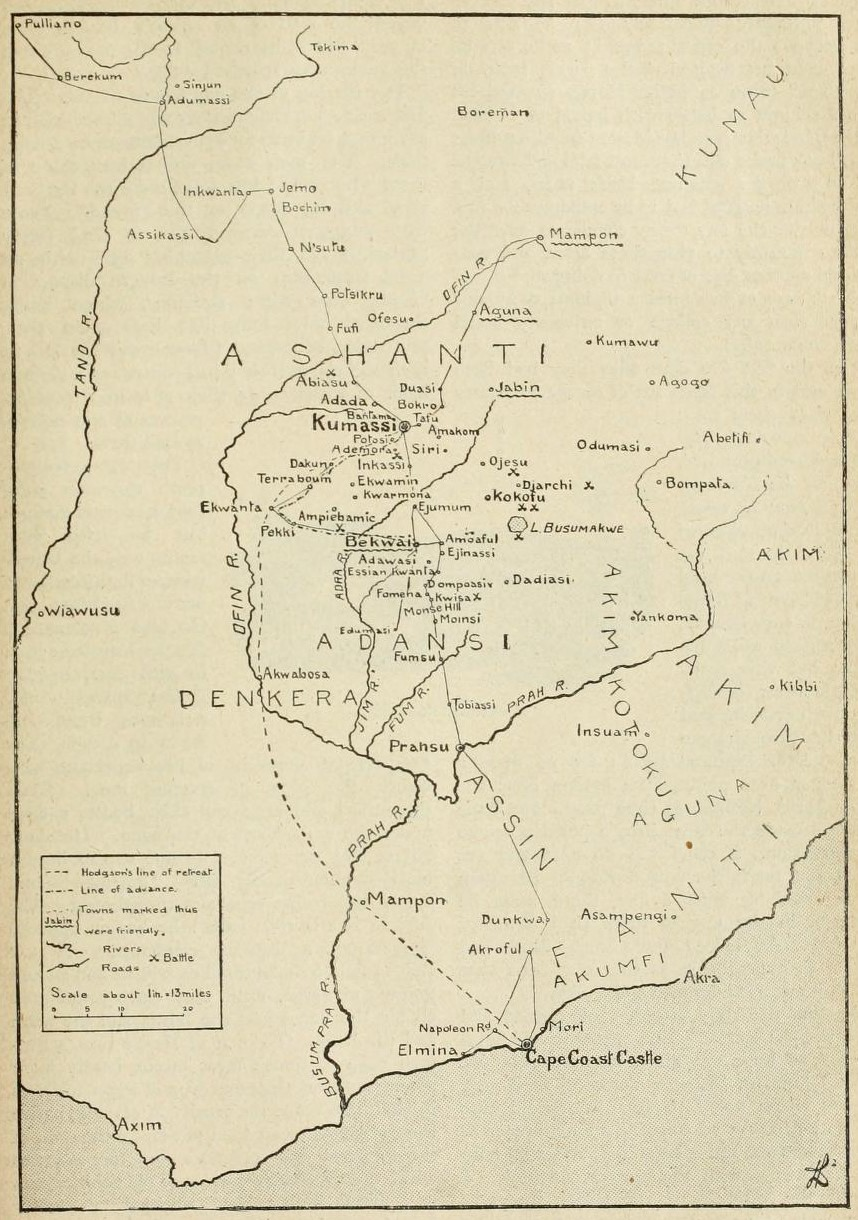
Ashanti War in 1900 (Battles of the nineteenth century, 1901)

In her war speech Queen Mother Yaa Asantewaa I (the Queen Mother of the Ejisu dominion within the Ashanti kingdom) rallied resistance against the British:

Now I have seen that some of you fear to go forward to fight for our king. If it were in the brave days, the days of Osei Tutu, Okomfo Anokye, and Opoku Ware, chiefs would not sit down to see their king taken away without firing a shot. No foreigner [Obroni] could have dared to speak to a chief of the Ashanti in the way the Governor spoke to you chiefs this morning. Is it true that the bravery of the Ashanti is no more? I cannot believe it. It cannot be! I must say this, if you, the men of Ashanti, will not go forward, then we will. We, the women, will. I shall call upon my fellow women. We will fight! We will fight till the last of us falls in the battlefields.

She collected men to form a force with which to attack the British and retrieve the exiled king.

The enraged populace produced a large number of volunteers. As Hodgson's deputy Captain Cecil Armitage searched for the stool in a nearby brush, his force was surrounded and ambushed, but a sudden rainstorm allowed the survivors to retreat to the Kumasi Fort — a rectangular stockade 50 yards (46 m) square with 12 feet (3.7 m) high stone walls and firing turrets at each corner — that housed 18 Europeans, dozens of mixed-race colonial administrators and 500 Nigerian Hausa troops with six small field guns and four Maxim guns. The British detained several high ranking leaders in the fort. The Ashanti, aware that they were unprepared for storming the fort, settled into a long siege. They only made one unsuccessful assault on the position, which occurred on 29 April. The Ashanti continued to snipe at the defenders, cut the telegraph wires, blockade food supplies, and attack relief columns. Blocking all roads leading to the town with 21 log barricades six feet high with loopholes to fire through, hundreds of yards long and so solid they would be impervious to artillery fire.

As supplies ran low and disease took its toll on the defenders, another rescue party of 700 arrived in June. Recognising that it was necessary to escape from the trap and to preserve the remaining food for the wounded and sick, some of the healthier men along with Hodgson, his wife and over a hundred of the Hausas made a break on 23 June, meeting up with the rescue force they were evacuated. 12,000 Ashanti abrade (warriors) were summoned to attack the escapees, who gained a lead on the long road back to the Crown Colony, thus avoiding the main body of the Abrade. Days later the few survivors of the abrade assault took a ship for Accra, receiving all available medical attention.

On 7 July 1900 The Star newspaper in Guernsey featured an article about Yaa Asenatewaa and her growing support amongst the Ashanti: "The Colonial Office has received disquieting news that the Queen Ashantuah [sic] ruler of Ofesa, has taken Supreme Command of the insurgent forces. She has under her Command General Asmarah, the Cacique of Esili, and an army of 20,000 warriors, including a battalion of Amazons and 1000 hand picked Soldiers who form a kind of Sacred Band (L'Estafette, Paris)".

== The rescue column ==
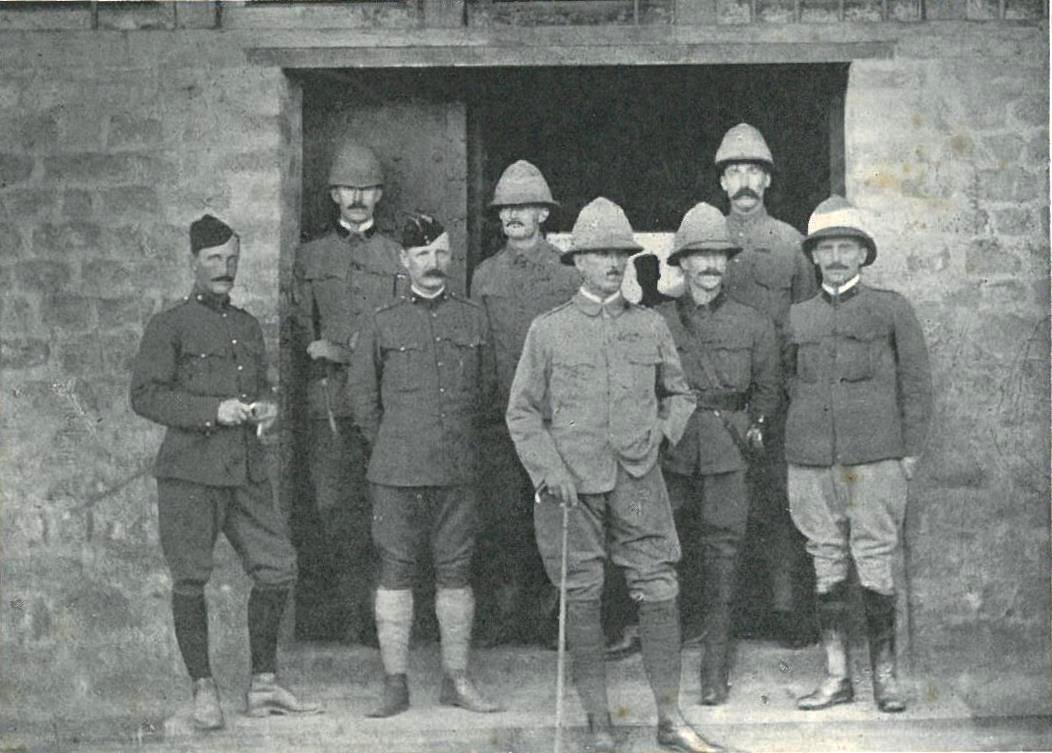
General Sir James Willcocks, KCMG, DSO, and staff, at the entrance to the fort at Kumasi

As Hodgson arrived at the coast, a rescue force of 1,000 men assembled from various British units and police forces stationed across West Africa and under the command of Major James Willcocks had set out from Accra. On the march Willcocks's men had been repulsed from several well-defended forts belonging to groups allied with the Ashanti – most notably the stockade at Kokofu, where they had suffered heavy casualties. During the march Willcocks was faced with constant trials of skirmishing with an enemy in his own element while maintaining his supply route in the face of an opposing force utilizing unconventional warfare. In early July, his force arrived at Bekwai and prepared for the final assault on Kumasi, which began on the morning of 14 July 1900. Using a force led by Yoruba warriors from Nigeria serving in the Frontier Force, Willcocks drove in four heavily guarded stockades, finally relieving the fort on the evening of 15 July, when the inhabitants were just two days from surrender.

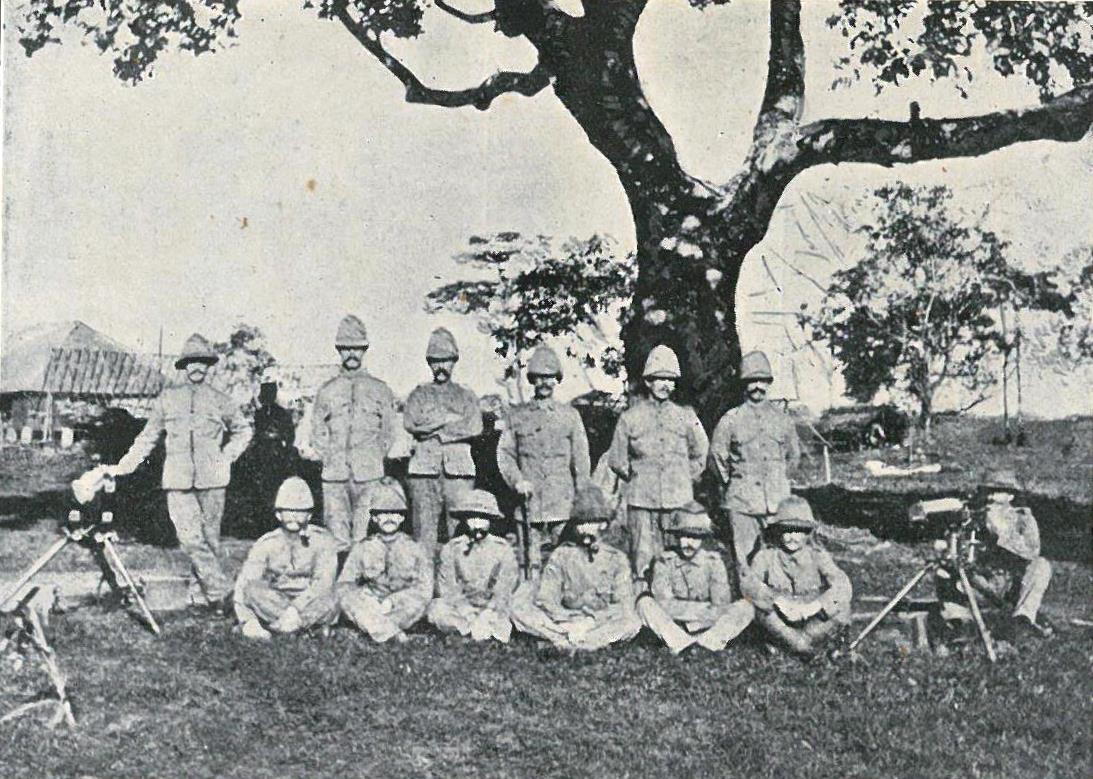
Group of NCO's with Maxim guns at Kumasi

On 17 July the majority of the force (excluding a garrison of 160 men under the supervision of five British officers and NCOs under the command of Captain Eden) set off on the return journey to Bekwai carrying their sick and wounded. Once the column had travelled approximately two miles from Kumasi the sound of guns from the city fort could be heard. Willcocks writes that "we afterwards learnt that Eden had placed the garrison under cover, and thus drawn out the enemy to explore the precincts. When a good number had come out into the open, 7-pounders and Maxims were turned on them with excellent effect". Willcocks says later in The Great Drama Of Kumasi by Major Wynyard Montagu Hall that "In my opinion the garrison left behind at Kumasi was altogether unequal to the task of holding fort, and nothing less than fear of Ashantis to attack could have saved them not with standing strong fort. I have never seen anything so gruesome as the vicinity fort. I expected, with my one thousand seven hundred unarmed native followers and the sick and wounded, some difficulty in coming out; but enemy's being completely dispersed on July 15th seems to have frightened them, as they did not fire a shot for twenty-five miles' march which took three days owing to two days' excessive rain."

The column made their arrival in Bekwai on 19 July. On the day of their arrival Lieutenant Colonel Morland also arrived with reinforcements from Nigeria, and further reinforcements consisting of a detachment of Sikhs, half a battalion of the Central Africa Regiment and then the remainder of the 2nd Battalion of the Central Africa Regiment followed. On 22 July Morland attacked Kokofu with a force of 800 men, taking the Ashanti by surprise and resulting in a rout with weapons and supplies being abandoned.

In September, after spending the summer recuperating and tending to the sick and wounded in captured Kumasi, Willcocks sent out flying columns to the neighbouring regions that had supported the uprising. His troops defeated an Ashanti force in a skirmish at Obassa on 30 September and also succeeded in destroying the fort and town at Kokofu where he had been previously repulsed, using Nigerian levies to hunt Ashanti soldiers. Ashanti defenders would usually exit the engagement quickly after a stiff initial assault. Following the storming of the town, Captain Charles John Melliss was awarded the Victoria Cross for his bravery in the attack.

== Aftermath ==
Ashanti was annexed into the British Empire; however, the Ashanti still largely governed themselves. They gave little or no deference to colonial authorities. The Ashanti were successful in their pre-war goal to protect the Golden Stool. But, the following year (1901), the British arrested numerous chiefs, including the Queen Mother of Ejisu, Yaa Asantewaa, and exiled them to the Seychelles for 25 years. In that 25-year period many of them died, including Yaa Asantewaa herself in 1921. Kumasi City retains a memorial to this war and several large colonial residences. Ashanti and the former Gold Coast eventually became part of Ghana.

The war cost the British and their allies approximately 1,000 fatalities in total; however, according to a statement made by MP David Lloyd George in Parliament in 1901, "the Colonial Office should have had some justification for the foolish policy of the [British] Government in regard to the Golden Stool, that had led to the hundreds and thousands of the corpses of savages festering round the fort of Coomassie"! David Lloyd George further admonished Joseph Chamberlain for his dismissive attitude towards the Ashanti casualties in the war, noting that the Golden Stool was never captured by the British: "Surely human life was worth some respectful treatment", he said. The Golden Stool was hidden deep in the forests for the duration of the war, with the British continuing to seek it until 1921. Shortly after this, it was accidentally uncovered by a team of labourers who took the golden ornaments that adorned the stool and left the rest, which was of wood. An Ashanti court sentenced the labourers to death for their desecration, but British officials intervened and arranged for their exile instead.

British troops were awarded the Ashanti Medal for service during the war.

== Return of the King Prempeh I to Ashanti ==
In 1924, the King was allowed to return.

Thousands of people, white and black, flocked down to the beach to welcome him. They were sorely disappointed when the news flashed through that Nana Prempeh was not to be seen by anyone, and that he was to land at 5:30 pm and proceed straight away to Kumasi by a special train. Twenty minutes after the arrival of the train, a beautiful car brought Nana Prempeh into the midst of the assembly. It was difficult for us to realise even yet that he had arrived. A charming aristocratic-looking person in a black long suit with a fashionable black hat held up his hand to the cheers of the crowd. That noble figure was Nana Prempeh.

== See also ==
- Ashantiland
- Ashanti people
- History of Ghana

== Bibliography ==
- "The Yaa Asantewaa War of Independence Podcast".
- A. Adu Boahen (2003). Yaa Asantewaa and the Asante-british War of 1900-1. ISBN 978-9988550998.
- "Yaa Asantewaa Profile", GhanaWeb
- "Yaa Asantewaa's War". WebCite
- http://www.uiowa.edu/~africart/toc/history/giblinstate.html
- "The Golden Stool".
- "The story of Africa – West African Kingdoms", BBC World Service.
- Hernon, Ian Britain's Forgotten Wars, 2002 (ISBN 0-7509-3162-0)
- Lewin, J Asante before the British: The Prempean Years 1875-1900
- The Siege of Kumassi, Lady Mary Alice Hodgson
- Letters from a Bush Campaign, David Martineau Haylings
- The Ashanti Campaign of 1900, Captain C. H. Armitage DSO and Lieutenant Colonel A. F. Montanaro
- The Relief of Kumasi, Captain Harold C.J. Biss
- Dark and Stormy Days at Kumassi, 1900, or Missionary Experience in Ashanti according to the diary of Rev. Fritz Ramseyer, Friedrich Augustus Louis Ramseyer
- The Romance of Soldiering and Sport, General Sir James Willcocks, GCB, GCMG, KCSI, DSO
- The Golden Stool: Some Aspects of the Conflict of Cultures in Modern Africa, The Reverend Edwin W. Smith
- The Great Drama Of Kumasi, Major Wynyard Montagu Hall
