= Ejisu Senior High Technical School =

Public school in Ashanti Region, Ghana

Coordinates: 6.717°N 1.468°W

- Ejisu, Ashanti Region; Ghana

Information
- Type: secondary/high school, Technical
- Established: 1991 (35 years ago)
- Grades: Forms [1-3]
- Nickname: Ejisu SHTS

Ejisu Senior High Technical School (also known as Ejisu SHTS) is a public school located in Ejisu in Ejisu Municipal District in the Ashanti Region of Ghana. In 2021, the school was part of senior high schools put under surveillance on suspicion of examination malpractice by WAEC.

== History ==
The school was established in 1991.

== Former headteachers ==
- 2020, Kofi Appiah.
- 2022, Veronica Tandoh.
- As of 2024 Grace Asamani.
