= Besease =

- Town
- Interactive map of Besease
- Country: Ghana
- Region: Central Region

Besease is a town in the Central Region of Ghana. The town is known for the Besease Secondary Commercial School. The school is a second cycle institution.
