= Ejisu Municipal Assembly =

Ejisu Municipal District
- Municipal District
- Districts of Ashanti Region

- Location of Ejisu Municipal District in Ghana
- Coordinates: 6°43′N 1°28′W
- Country: Ghana
- Region: Ashanti
- Capital: Ejisu

Population (2012)
  - Total: —
- Time zone: UTC+0 (GMT)

Ejisu Municipal District is one of the forty-three districts in Ashanti Region, Ghana. Originally it was formerly part of the then-larger Ejisu-Juaben Municipal District in 1988, which was created from the former Ejisu-Juaben-Bosomtwe District Council, until the northeast part of the district was split off to create Juaben Municipal District on 15 March 2018; thus the remaining part has been renamed as Ejisu Municipal District. The municipality is located in the central part of Ashanti Region and has Ejisu as its capital town.

== Sources ==
- "Districts of Ghana". Statoids.
- GhanaDistricts.com
