= Kwabena Owusu Aduomi =

Ghanaian politician

Deputy Minister
- Incumbent
- Assumed office March 2017
- President: Nana Akuffo-Addo

Personal details
- Born: 17 September 1960 (age 65) Ejisu-Besease, Ashanti Region, Ghana
- Party: Independent Candidate

Kwabena Owusu Aduomi (born 17 September 1960) is a Ghanaian politician and a Member of Parliament of Ghana. He is a member of the New Patriotic Party (NPP) and the deputy minister for Roads and Highways in Ghana.

== Early life ==
Aduomi was born on 17 September 1960 in Ejisu-Besease, Ashanti Region of Ghana.

== Personal life ==
Aduomi identifies as a Christian and a member of the Assemblies of God Church. He is married with six children.

== Education ==
He earned his bachelor of science degree in civil engineering at Kwame Nkrumah University of Science and Technology in 1985.

== Career ==
Aduomi became a maintenance engineer at the highway authority in Tamale in 1987–1994, then proceeded to be a projects manager at highway authorities in the western region in 1994–2002. He became the regional director for highways in the Ashanti region in 2002–2008. He then became a member of the 6th parliament of the 4th republic of Ghana.

== Political life ==
He was elected as MP for Ejisu Constituency in the Ashanti Region of Ghana in 2009. He was selected to join the subsidiary legislation committee and the Local Government and Rural Development Committee.

=== 2012 election ===
Aduomi contested for Ejisu constituency parliamentary seat in the Ashanti Region of Ghana on the ticket of the New Patriotic Party in the 2012 Ghanaian general election and won with 51,976 votes representing 80.52% of the total votes. He was elected over Augustus Andrew of the National Democratic Congress, Isaac Prah of the PPP, Richard Nana Asare of the UFP, Rita Nti-Adjei of the Convention People's Party, Lucy Kazapoe of the PNC, Kwaku Adusei of the DPP and Lasisi Fatao of the NDP. They obtained 11, 788 votes, 632 votes, 155 votes, 0 votes, 0 votes, 0 votes and 0 votes respectively, equivalent to 18.26%, 0.98%, 0.24%, 0.00%, 0.00%, 0.00% and 0.00% of the total votes respectively.

=== 2016 election ===
Aduomi again contested for Ejisu constituency parliamentary seat in the Ashanti Region on the ticket of the New Patriotic Party during the 2016 Ghanaian general election and won with 54,508 votes representing 83.79% of the total votes. He won the election over Gloria Korshar Huze of the National Democratic Congress, who polled 9, 485 votes which is equivalent to 14.58%, PPP parliamentary candidate Isaac Prah had 859 votes representing 1.32% and Alex Appiah Koree of the Convention People's Party had 200 votes representing 0.31% of the total votes.

== Corruption ==
Aduomi has been identified as one of two key individuals who worked with the siblings Rushil and Nishani Singh from South Africa. Aduomi is alleged to have received about 390,000 Ghanaian cedis (about $53,000) in bribes that were paid directly to his bank account from the Singhs' company. This was to facilitate tenders worth at least $54.1m for the contracts awarded between 2015 and 2019, which were for the rehabilitation and construction of more than 100 km of roads and storm drains, as well as construction work on several hospitals. Their business, Ghana Infrastructure Company (GIC), was paid the equivalent of $18.4m for work completed between September 2017 and November 2022.

On 18 March 2023, Cloete and Thomas Murray were shot and killed while traveling in a vehicle on the N1 near Midrand, South Africa, when gunmen opened fire on their car. This was after they had started to unearth evidence that siblings Rushil and Nishani Singh—with whom they spent their final hours—had allegedly built a multi-million dollar empire in Ghana on a series of lies and bribes. The Singhs were arrested and charged with defrauding Investec Bank of 178 million using a fraudulent bank guarantee. Nishani Sing died in custody in October 2024 while awaiting trial for her alleged role in a R150 million fraud case involving forged Stanbic Bank Ghana guarantees.
