= Juaben =

- Town
- Location within Ghana
- Coordinates: 6°49′N 1°26′W
- Country: Ghana
- Region: Ashanti Region
- District: -Juaben Municipal
- Elevation: 1,066 ft (325 m)
- Time zone: GMT
  - Summer (DST): GMT

Juaben is a traditional town in the Juaben Municipality in the Ashanti Region of Ghana.

== History ==
Not only had all the royals of Dwabeng been of the Oyoko clan, but the king of Dwabeng is also the Oyokohene or the family head of all Oyoko clan members of the Akan. Juaben (correctly: Dwabeng) is one of the five principal towns of the Asante nation or the Asante Amantuo Num, that originally came together against the then reigning empire of Denkyira. The 1st Dwabenhene is believed to be from Asumegya Asantemanso and the ancestress of this stool is called Aberewa Ampim. It was Aberewa Ampim who came with her own retinue of advisors and elders from Asumegya Asantemanso. At this time it is said that there is no stool whatsoever attached to the Dwabeng state. Whilst coming she settled at Otikurom Dwabeng Mma a term for all of Dwabeng, she stayed in Dwabeng for about four or five years. She had lots of children -many which migrated- and one son called Aketewa(meaning the youngest) was considered the handsome son of all. As a hunter, he discovered the present area Dwabeng and he meet a certain man in the area by the name Boama Kokoo Se Bota - another hunter-, along with his family. It turned out that the two men are both of the same Oyoko clan and Aketewa was welcomed in Boama's home. After his stay, he went back and informed his mother.

Among the Asante Amantuo Num, before becoming Asanteman and still subservient to the Denkyira Empire: Dwabeng was responsible for the firewood of Denkyerahene; Nsuta is responsible for the red clay; Mampong was responsible for the cotton fibers for cloth making; Kwamanhene(Kwaman now Kumasi) had to send one of His maidservant annually to the Denkyerahene to nurse his nieces and nephew(future heirs to the Denkyera stool). The messenger of Denkyerahene Ntim Gyakari was sent to collect these various tributes from these five towns. Kwamanhene Obiri Yeboah was an uncle of Osei Tutu, Osei Tutu was sent to Denkyera for training. During the battle of Feyiase in 1701 between the newly formed Asante state, it was the Dwabenhene who caught Ntim Gyakari on the battlefield while the Commander-in-Chief of this war was Nana Boahene Anantuo, the Mamponhene. But Ntim Gyakari was captured alive by Dwabenhene Nana Adaakwaa Yiadom. After the battle, he was sent to Kumasi, where he was beheaded. His head was taken by the Asantehene, his legs by the Mamponhene, and his fingers by the Juabenhene. Ntim Gyakari's fingers or Kwadumasa in Twi can still be found today on the Dwabenhene's umbrella.

After Nana Adaakwaa Yiadom's death, his Stool was smoked or blackened by his brother (an Akan tradition when a royal had deceased), Osei Hwidie, during the reign of Nana Opoku Ware. Nana Osei Hwidie, wanting to expand his boundaries sort out by Abuasohene Ntiamoah Amankuo to kill him and gain his control of said lands. Nana Osei took possession of his towns, drums, villages. This was only the beginning of his expansion of Dwabeng rulership. At a later date, Nana Dwabenhene questioned Boama Kokoo about whether there were any other people or Chiefs who shared a common boundary with him. Boama Kokoo told him that there is one chief, by name Ofinam, the Nkuokromhene, his lands too were taken after his death. So was the lands of the Adumanhene, to which was the ancestor of Nsutahene and the lands of the Brebemo, Nsusohene; the Kyekewerehene; Bomfahene Mmonh Diawuo and of Hemanhene Owusu Biremprong, whilst driving him away from Sekyere.

Osei Kwame Panyin, to fought with Basahene Kwabena Sabre at Basahene (Krachihene). The Basahene was defeated and sent to Dwabeng, carrying the truthful stone (Nnokware Buo). The cause of the war was some valuable gold trinkets in the possession of the Basahene, which were coveted by the Asante. There is a certain Fetish, by name Denteh, now at Dwaben, which was captured from Krachi as a result of this war. It is said that this Fetish predicted that the Krachi Chief could not fight with the powerful Chief Akraase after the war the Fetish announced that he had seen that Juabenhene was a powerful Chief; whenever he went to the war he would follow him. It is said there is a horn attached to the Stool which was captured by Akraase. It is blown when Juabenhene is taking the field for war, in the Abeng language (Asante horn communication a pattern of tonal shifts similar to Morse code, says: Okrakye Dente Okrakye Dente) It is said that only Nana Juabenhene has this horn, and no other chief in Asante. Nana Akraase was succeeded on the Stool by Nana Akuamoah Panyin, his brother, during the reign of Bonsu Panyin.

=== New Juabeng: Oyoko and Koforidua ===
After Asanteman had been established in the late 1800s, a portion of Dwabeng had separated from Asanteman and found asylum in Okyeman, the Akyem nation and created New Juabeng also called Koforidua. To this day, they had been independent from the golden stool. When Nana Kofi Karikari (King of Ashantis) and his Kumasi forces (now in the Ashanti Region) attacked Dwabeng and its allies in October 1875, the Sekyere towns of Effiduase and Asokore formed an alliance. Whilst Effiduase and Asokore were led by their chiefs during the sojourn, Oyoko and their king Nana Adjei Bohyen, was one of the Sekyere towns which migrated to present day New Juaben in the now Eastern Region under the leadership of Nana Kwaku Boateng and killed Kofi Karikari. It was his nephew Kwadwo Kesse who led the migrants from Asante - Oyoko to present day New Juaben in the Eastern Region and they came with their sacred stool (Kro and Dabo Stool)

== Geography ==
=== Location ===
The town is close to the Ejisu-Juaben Municipal district's capital, Ejisu. Its geographical coordinates are 6° 49' 0" North, 1° 26' 0" West.

== Education ==
Juaben is known for the Juaben Secondary School. The school is a second cycle institution.

== Agriculture ==
Three types of soil are predominantly found in the area which support cash crops such as cocoa, coffee, oil palm and citrus; dry season vegetables such as sweet potatoes, sugarcane and rice; and annual and semi-perennial crops such as plantain, cocoyam and bananas.

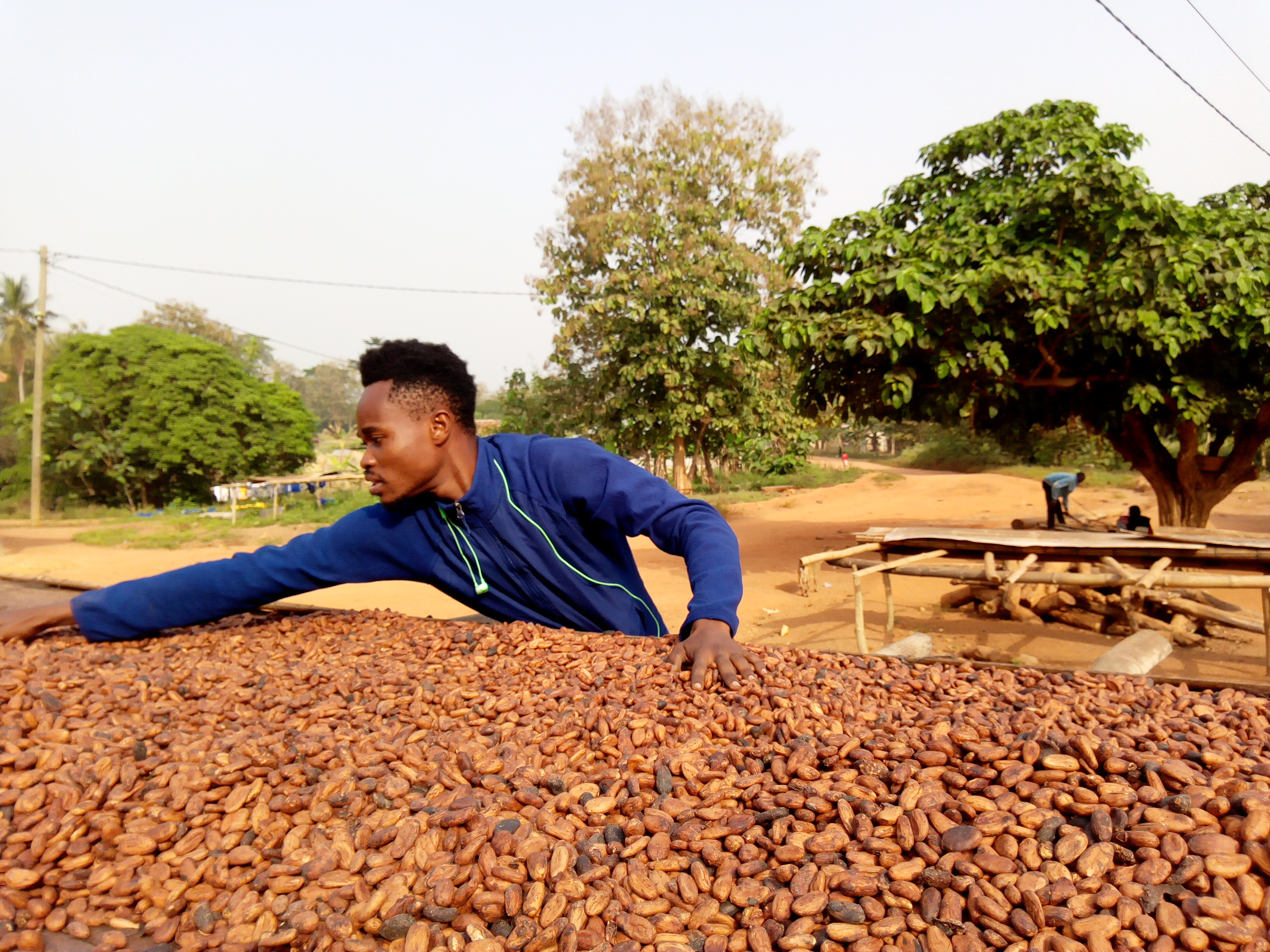
Cocoa farming in Nkyerepoaso, in Juaben municipality.

== Healthcare ==
The Juaben Hospital is the town's primary healthcare institution.

== Sport ==
A large number of residents in the town are supporters of the English professional football club Aston Villa F.C., inspired by the childhood support of resident Owusu Boakye Amando.

== People of Notable Descent ==
According to Amy Ashwood-Garvey, 1st wife of Jamaican Pan-Africanist founder Marcus Garvey, her grandmother told her that she descended from Dwaben (pronounced "Juaben") and that her grandmother (known as "Granny Dabas") was a captive from Juaben. Granny Dabas's name was Boahemaa. In 1924 she met J. B. Danquah in London and told him her grandmother's story and Danquah confirmed to her that Dwaben is in fact an Asante city-state. Fifteen years later she also met another Ghanaian Barrister Kwabena Kese. In 1946, Barrister Kese took Mrs Garvey to Juaben leading to the verification of her Granny Dabas' account and would later adopt the name Akosua Boahemaa. She would also meet Osei Tutu Agyeman Prempeh II. The Asante people are commonly known to Jamaicans as the freedom fighters that fought against slavery and oppression. The Jamaican national heroine Nanny of the Maroons was also an Asante royal. Many Jamaicans, even non-maroons, can also make accounts of having family of Asante descent.
