= Ejisu-Juaben Municipal District =

Municipal District in Ashanti Region, Ghana

- Former Municipal District
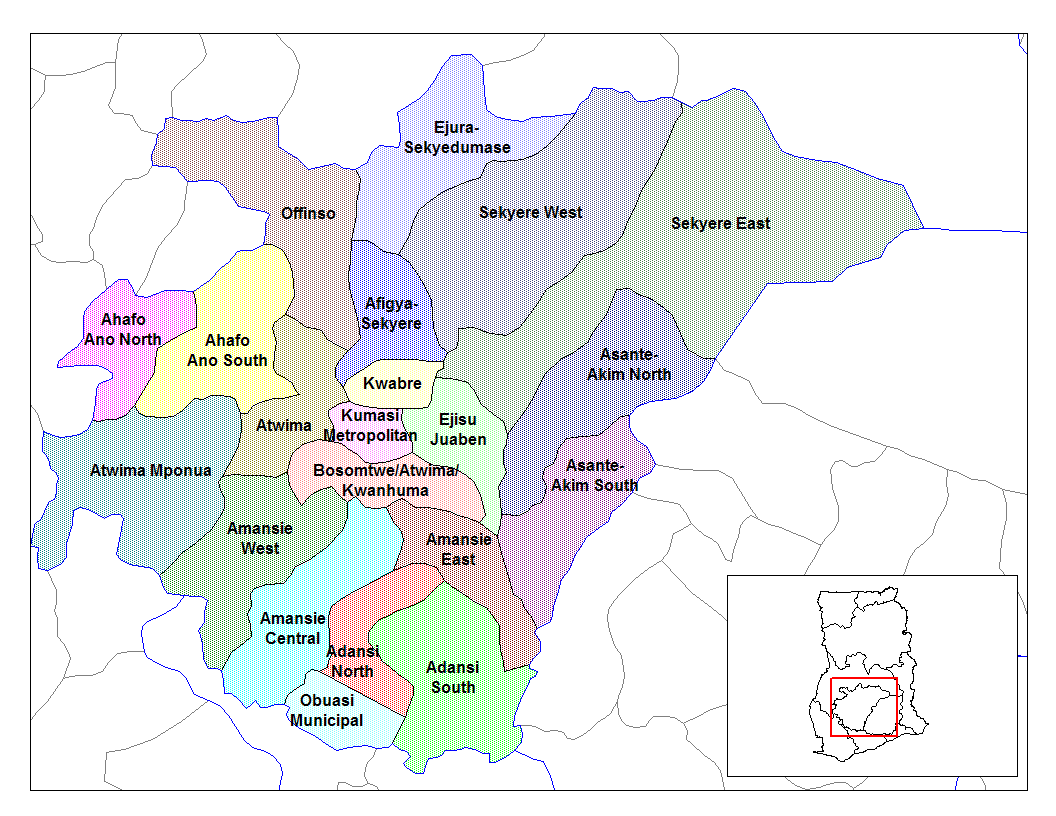
- Districts of Ashanti Region

- Location of Ejisu-Juaben Municipal District in Ghana
- Coordinates: 6°43′N 1°28′W
- Country: Ghana
- Region: Ashanti
- Capital: Ejisu

Government
  - Municipal Chief Executive: Yaw Ahenkra Afrifa

Area
  - Total: 637 km^{2} (246 sq mi)

Population (2021)
  - Total: 180,723
  - Density: 284/km^{2} (735/sq mi)
- Time zone: UTC+0 (GMT)

Ejisu-Juaben Municipal District is a former district that was located in the Ashanti Region of Ghana. Originally created as an ordinary district assembly on 10 March 1989 when it was known as Ejisu-Juaben District which was created from the former Ejisu-Juaben-Bosomtwe District Council. It was later elevated to municipal district assembly status in 2007 (effectively 29 February 2008) to become Ejisu-Juaben Municipal District. However, on 15 March 2018, it was split off into two new municipal districts: Ejisu Municipal District (capital: Ejisu) and Juaben Municipal District (capital: Juaben). The municipality was located in the central part of Ashanti Region and had Ejisu as its capital town.

== Sources ==
- "Districts of Ghana". Statoids.
- GhanaDistricts.com
