= Ejisu =

Municipal capital in Ashanti region, Ghana

- Municipal capital
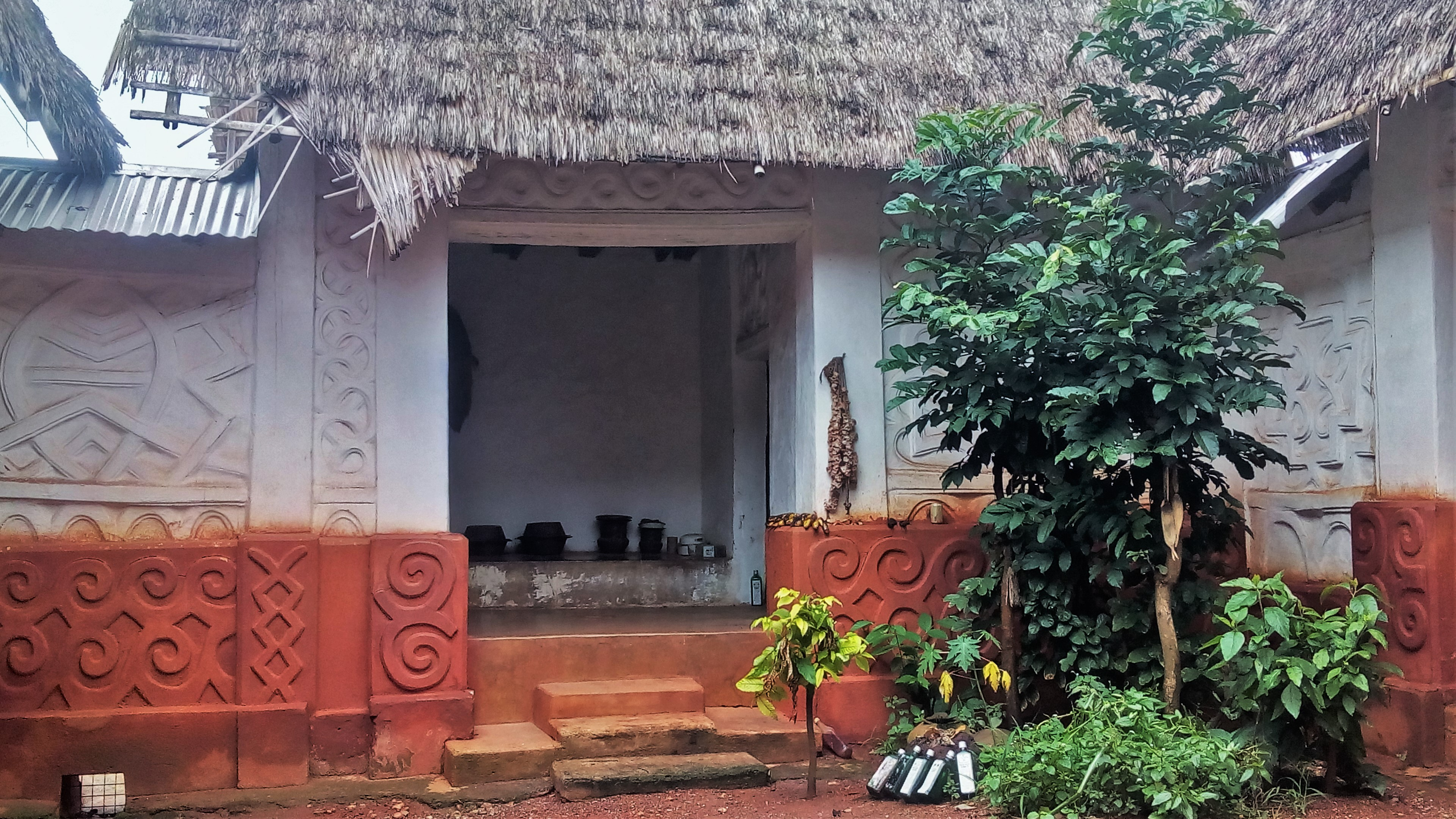
- Ejisu Besease traditional shrine

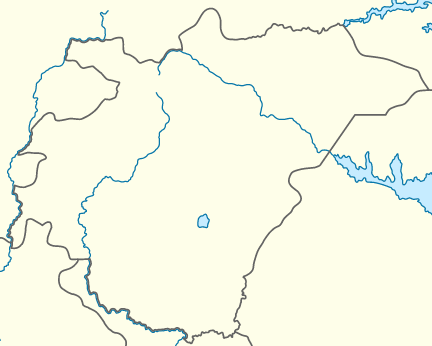
- Location of Ejisu in Ashanti
- Coordinates: 6°42′53.91″N 1°30′40.25″W
- City-state: Ashanti
- Municipality: Ejisu Municipal Assembly
- Elevation: 879 ft (268 m)

Population
  - Ethnicity: Ashanti people
  - Nationality: Ashanti
- Time zone: Greenwich Mean Time
  - Summer (DST): GMT

Ejisu is a city in Kumasi located along the Kumasi-Accra highway about 20 km from Kumasi. It is the capital of Ejisu Municipal Assembly, a municipality of the Ashanti Region, Ghana. This municipal is one of the 30 administrative and political Districts in the Ashanti Region of Ghana. It was established by Legislative Instrument (L.I) 1890.

In 2020, the nkosuohene of Ejisu was Nana Kofi Poku. In 2022, the chief of Ejisu was Nana Afrane Okese. As of 2024, the municipal chief executive of the town was Samuel Oduro Frimpong.

== Education ==
- Ejisu Senior High Technical School
- Ejisuman Senior High School
- Ejisu Experimental Basic School
- Ejisu Krapa M/A Basic School and JHS

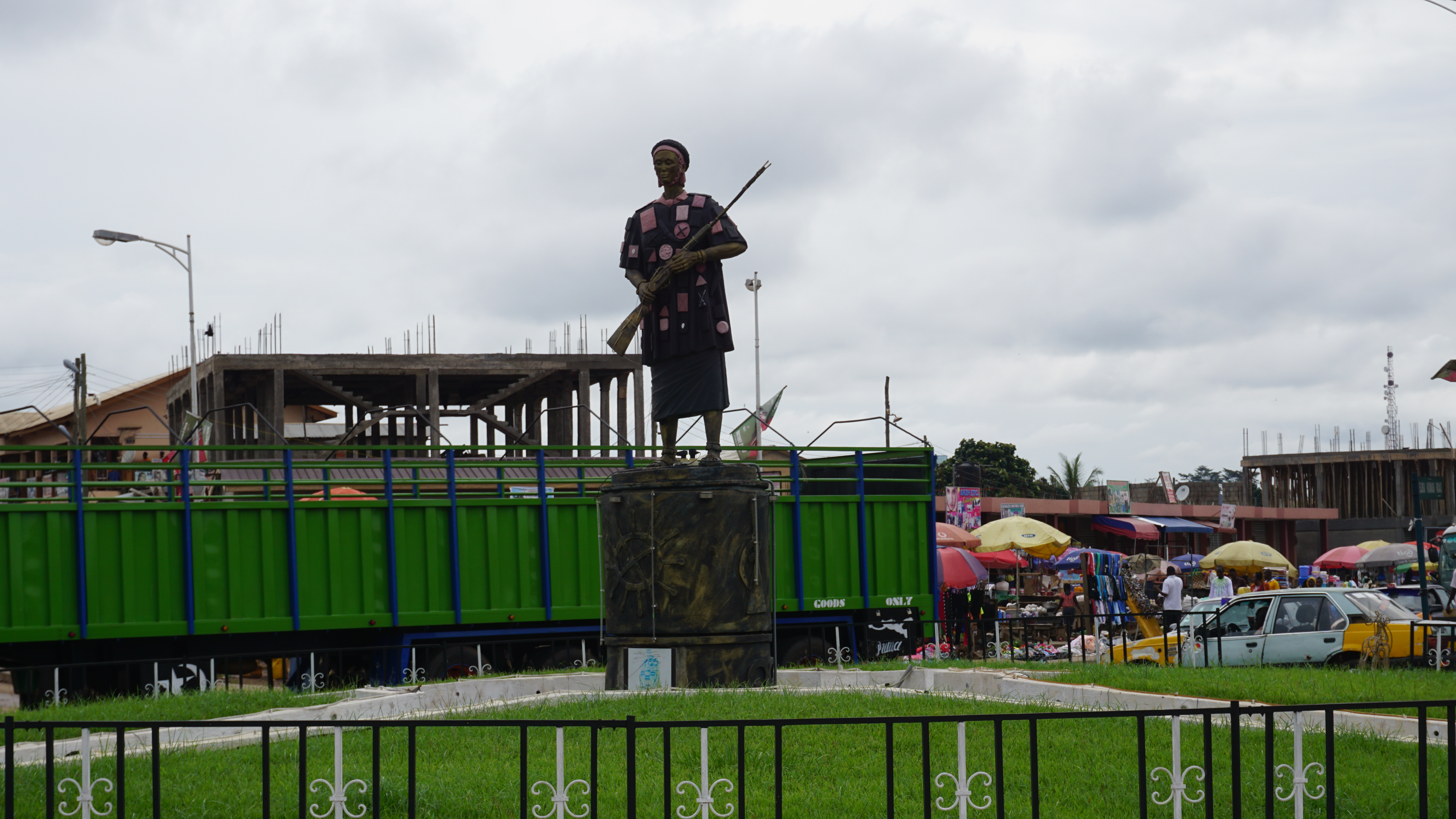
Ejisu roundabout
