= Christ Presbyterian Church, Akropong =

Presbyterian church in Akropong-Akuapem, Ghana

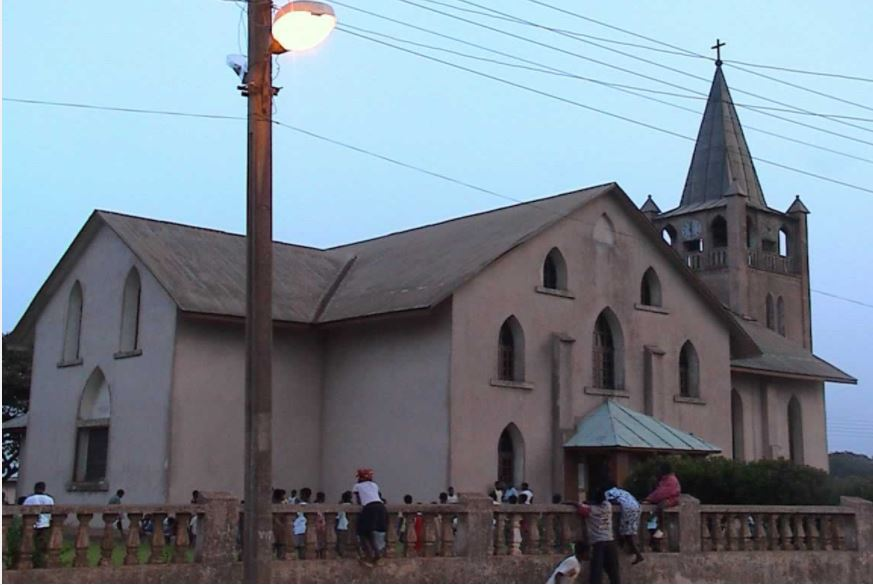
- Christ Presbyterian Church, Akropong
- 5.9721°N 0.0874°W
- Location: Akropong-Akuapem
- Country: Ghana
- Denomination: Presbyterian Church of Ghana
- Previous denomination: Basel Evangelical Missionary Society
- Website: Christ Presbyterian Church, Akropong

History
- Former name(s): Basel Mission Church, Akropong
- Founded: 1835; 191 years ago
- Founders: Andreas Riis; Basel Mission

The Christ Presbyterian Church, formerly known as the Basel Mission Church, Akropong, is a historic Protestant church located in Akropong–Akuapem, Ghana. It is the first Presbyterian Church to be established in Ghana. It was founded in 1835 by Andreas Riis, a Danish minister and missionary of the Basel Mission who was the only congregant at the time. After years of dormancy, the church began to flourish after the arrival of the Moravian missionaries from the West Indies in 1843 . The Basel missionary, Johann Georg Widmann was appointed the minister-in-charge of the Akropong church in 1845. The Jamaican missionary, John Hall, who had served as an elder in his home church in Irwin Hill, Montego Bay, became the first Presbyter of the church while Alexander Worthy Clerk became the first Deacon. Liturgical services are conducted in English and the Twi language.

== History ==
=== Pre-colonial narratives ===
Per historical accounts by the Ghanaian historian, Kwamena Poh, the Akuapem state was founded in the mid-17th century. The Akwamus had subjugated the Guans living on the hill by 1646. In his research, “The Akwamu suzerainty witnessed a period of disturbed conditions among the Guan communities: incessant plunder, bad harvests … actions of cruelty.” As a result of Akwamu atrocities, life became insufferable for the Guan natives leading to a struggle for secure their freedom. The Guans appealed to the paramount chief of Akyem Abuakwa, Nana Ofori Panin to intervene in the matter. The chieftain then enlisted his warrior nephew, Ofori Dua, also known as Ofori Kae or Ofori Kuma, nicknamed “Safori” to lead a war against the Akwamus in order to liberate the Guans. The military exercise was successful and the Guans defeated the Akwamus. A new nation state, Akuapem was born under the political leadership of Ofori Dua. Akuapem broadly means “one thousand groups” in the Twi language. The various communities in this mountainous region came together in 1731 to form a political association with delegates from each clan. The concord or inauguration of the independent nation state took place at a place called, “Abotakyi”. At the ceremony, the Akuapem people pledged their allegiance to their war hero, Ofori Dua. In historical accounts, after the inauguration of the nation state, emigrants from Akyem-Abuakwa settled on the hills of Akuapem, in predominantly two areas, Amanokrom, the seat of the Gyaase division and Akropong, the capital of the new State. The original state capital was at Amanprobi, built on a parcel of land donated by Okyeame Aworoben of Mamfe. However, the area was marshy and therefore unsuitable for settlement. As a result, a new location, known today as Nsorem, was offered by Nana Baagyiri of Abiriw. It was at this site that Akropong was founded as the traditional seat of the overlords under the shades of the Mpeni trees. Today, the seat of the church is at Akropong in the Akuapem Presbytery within the district assembly. The paramount chief for the area is the Okuapehene. The District Directorate of Education oversees schools and colleges in the town while the District Police Command in charge of maintaining the town's security.

=== Andreas Riis and the West Indians ===
Hundred years after the founding of Akropong during the reign of Nana Addo Dankwa, a Danish minister and missionary of the Basel Mission, Andreas Riis arrived in Akropong in January 1835 on a fact-finding mission, accompanied by his mulatto friend, George Lutterodt who served as his interpreter. He was to begin missionary work after seven years of fruitless missionary work in Christiansborg, Osu on the Gold Coast. This was part of the larger efforts that began on 18 December 1828 when Riis and two other missionaries including a physician, were sent by the Basel Mission as replacements for the first four pioneer German and Swiss missionaries who had died shortly after their arrival in West Africa from tropical diseases. The invitation to evangelise at the time was at the behest of Major Christopher von Richileu, Danish Governor of the Gold Coast at the time. Andreas Riis was the only surviving missionary of his cohort.

The coastal weather was much warmer than towns at higher elevation. Riis decided to move to Akuapem Hills due to the conducive climate, his desire to work among truly indigenous people whose way of life had not been influenced by European settlement, like it was in coastal areas, and the freedom that came with working in remote towns and villages without any suspicion of being a colonial agent. The paramount chief, Nana Addo Dankwa I and his elders, especially Nana Kwaw Kutruku warmly received Riis at the royal palace. On 26 March 1835, Andreas Riis relocated permanently to Akropong. He lived like the locals and built his own house, earning the nickname, “Osiadan” meaning builder, in the process.

After its establishment in 1835, the Christ Presbyterian Church, Akropong, the “cradle of Presbyterian Christianity in Ghana, set upon “the city on the hill” floundered in the early years due to a lack of converts. The arrival of the West Indian missionaries from Jamaica and Antigua revived the church and was the foundation for the work of the Presbyterian Church of Ghana. While the Basel Mission’s first station was Osu, Accra, then known as Christiansborg. Its relocation to the inland town of Akropong after three years was a watershed moment that led to the evangelization of the Gospel to the inhabitants of the town and spread of Christianity to the rest of the country.

Riis’ mission work bore no fruits and for about a few years, he was the only Christian at Akropong. At this point, he decided to permanently leave the Gold Coast for Europe with the blessing of the Basel Mission home office in Switzerland. The paramount chief organised a valedictory durbar in his honour. During the farewell ceremony, the chief made comments that implied that Christianity and the Bible was for the white man while the idolatry was reserved for the African native. However, if Riis could show him black Christians, he and his people would convert to Christianity.

This goodbye philosophical message became food for thought for Andreas Riis and he relayed the chief's words to the Home Committee in Basel upon his return to Europe. A Basel Mission delegation including Riis then went to Jamaica and Antigua to recruit Afro-Caribbean Christians. On 16 or 17 April 1843, 24 individuals consisting of six distinct families and three bachelors arrived in Osu and shortly thereafter, to Akropong to engage in pioneering missionary work.

The West Indians revived the evangelical mission and Christian church Riis had started in 1835. Toward the end of 1843, the Caribbean missionaries started one of the first primary schools in the country in order to introduce literacy into the area. In 1848, a teacher-training college, the Basel Mission Seminary was established which is now known as the Presbyterian College of Education, Akropong. Some of the Jamaican missionaries like Alexander Worthy Clerk became instructors in biblical theology at the seminary. In 1867, the now defunct Akropong Salem School was founded, following the model of the Osu Salem School, which had been established by Clerk and two others on 17 November 1843. These Salem schools produced many leaders in Gold Coast society including scholars and clergymen. Native pastors and Salem alumni such as David Asante, Theophilus Opoku, Jonathan Palmer Bekoe, and Paul Staudt Keteku, worked with Johann Gottlieb Christaller in translating the Bible into the Twi language and later in compiling his great Twi Dictionary and book of Akan proverbs.

=== 20th century ===
The Gold Coast church became fully independent in 1918 after the British colonial government expelled the Basel missionaries as alien security risk during World War I. The Abiriw, Adawso, Adukrom, Amanokrom, Anum, Larteh and Mamfe districts were created after this expulsion. The first Synod also saw the election of Peter Hall and Nicholas Timothy Clerk as Moderator and Synod Clerk of the Presbyterian Church of Ghana respectively. Both were children of the Jamaican missionaries who arrived in 1843; Peter Hall was the son of John Hall while Nicholas Timothy Clerk’s father was Alexander Worthy Clerk. The Akuapem campus of the Presbyterian University College was set up in the mid-2000 at a location close to the Christ Presbyterian Church, in a fitting legacy to the work and toil of the Andreas Riis, other Basel missionaries and the Jamaican Christian settlers.

== Hierarchy and church groups ==
Christ Presbyterian Church follows the apostolic practice and the Reformed tradition where the pastor is in charge of the local church. The congregation elects Presbyters in accordance with the constitution of the Presbyterian Church of Ghana to assists the ordained Agents (catechists and district and assistant ministers) to guide the general operations and administration of the church and enforce organisational discipline. Some of the church groups include:

- Women's fellowship – The group was set up in 1930 to support the women's ministry
- Men's fellowship – It is an organisation established by the church to foster men's ministry
- Young People's Guild- Founded in 1939, it was the third guild to be founded by Scottish missionary, Atkinson, in Ghana. The group was set up to explore and exchange ideas with youth outside their community through evangelism and excursions in nearby towns such as Abonse, Aseseeso, Apirede, Larteh, Mamfe, Aburi, Nsawam, Suhum, Koforidua, Kaneshie and Asamankese
- Singing band - It was founded in 1930 to propagate the gospel through songs to Christians and non-Christians at home and in the church, The Ghanaian composer, Ephraim Amu was the first Singing Band Master of the group
- Church choir- It was founded by H. A. Bekoe in October 1935 to lead the Church in hymns and sacred songs to enhance the church service experience.
- Bible study and prayer group – It was started in 1966 with the function and designation as the main evangelistic instrument for the propagation of the Gospel in all the Presbyteries and Mission Fields
- Kristo Nsraafo Group – It was established by an educationist, Asante Yeboah, at Akropong in 1933, to enrich church fellowship through their singing and witnessing.

== Akropong-born congregant-ministers ==
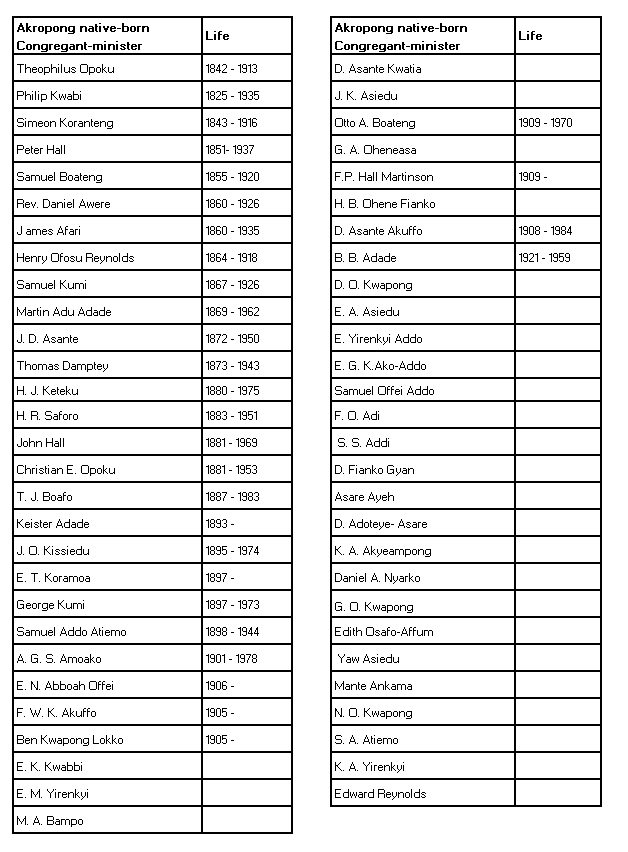

== Past resident district and assistant ministers ==
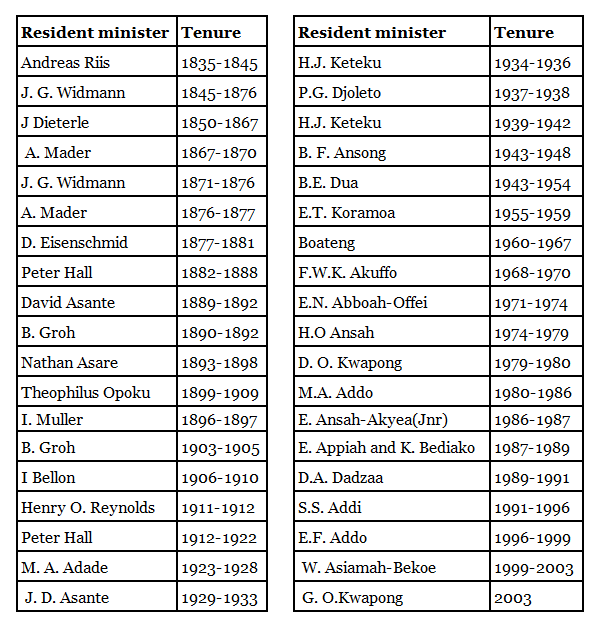

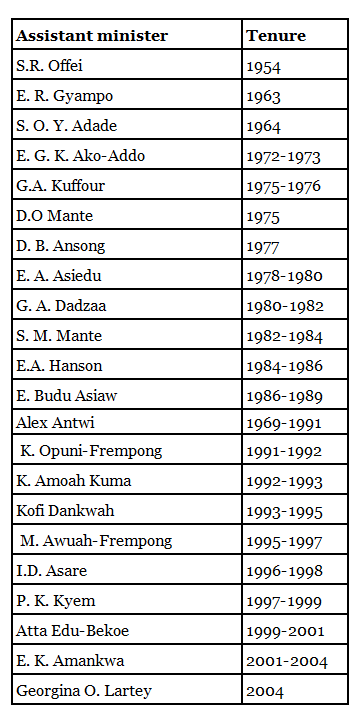

== Notable congregants ==
- Clement Anderson Akrofi- Gold Coast ethnolinguist, translator and philologist who worked extensively on the structure of the Twi language
- Ephraim Amu - Ghanaian musicologist, composer and teacher
- David Asante - first native Akan missionary of the Basel mission and philologist
- Emilie Christaller - German educator on the Gold Coast and Basel missionary-wife
- Johann Gottlieb Christaller - German missionary and philologist
- Alexander Worthy Clerk - Jamaican Moravian missionary and teacher
- Nicholas Timothy Clerk - Gold Coast-born Basel missionary, theologian and first Synod Clerk, Presbyterian Church of the Gold Coast
- Peter Hall - Gold Coast-born Jamaican educator, clergyman, missionary and first Moderator of the Presbyterian Church of the Gold Coast, 1918–1922
- Rose Ann Miller - Jamaican-born educator pioneer on the Gold Coast
- Catherine Mulgrave - Angolan-born Jamaican pioneer woman educator, administrator and missionary
- Theophilus Opoku - native Akan linguist, translator, philologist, educator and missionary who became the first indigenous African to be ordained a pastor on Gold Coast soil by the Basel Mission in 1872
- Kwabena Opuni Frimpong - Ghanaian academic and Presbyterian minister
- Fritz Ramseyer - Swiss missionary and builder; political prisoner in Asante from 1869 to 1874
- Carl Christian Reindorf - Gold Coast historian and Basel Mission pastor
- Andreas Riis - first Basel missionary on the Gold Coast and founder of the Christ Presbyterian Church, Akropong
- George Peter Thompson - first African Basel missionary
- Rosina Widmann - German educator on the Gold Coast and Basel missionary-wife
- Johannes Zimmermann, German missionary, translator, ethnolinguist and philologist

== See also ==
- Ebenezer Presbyterian Church, Osu
- Ramseyer Memorial Presbyterian Church
