= Peter Hall (minister) =

Gold Coast educator, missionary and minister (1851–1937)

The Very Reverend Peter Hall
- Peter Hall
- Born: 17 May 1851; Akropong, Gold Coast
- Died: 1937 (aged 85–86); Akropong, Gold Coast
- Education: Basel Mission Seminary, Akropong
- Occupations: Clergyman; Educator; Missionary
- Spouse: Mrs. Hall (m. 1874)
- Children: 8
- Parents: John Hall (father); Mary Hall (mother)

Ecclesiastical career
- Church: Presbyterian Church of the Gold Coast; Basel Evangelical Missionary Society
- Ordained: March 1882, Gold Coast
- Offices held: 1st Moderator, Presbyterian Church of the Gold Coast; (1918 – 1922)

Orders
- Ordination: March 1882, Gold Coast

Peter Hall (17 May 1851 – 1937) was a Gold Coast-born Jamaican teacher, missionary and Presbyterian clergyman who was elected the first Moderator of the Presbyterian Church of the Gold Coast, equivalent to the rank of chairperson of the synod or chief executive of the national church organisation, a position he held from 1918 to 1922. Hall was the son of John Hall, one of 24 West Indian missionaries who arrived in the Danish Protectorate of Christiansborg and worked under the auspices of the Basel Evangelical Missionary Society.

== Childhood and family ==
Peter Hall was born at Akropong-Akwapim on the Gold Coast on 17 May 1851, the tenth child of eleven children of his parents. His parents, John and Mary Hall, had been born into slavery in Jamaica. The older Halls came to the Gold Coast in 1843 as part of a group of 24 Caribbean Moravian missionaries recruited by the Danish minister, Andreas Riis and the Basel Mission in 1843, to aid the work of the society in evangelism and formal education. Though his parents were Jamaicans, Peter Hall regarded himself as a native of Akropong-Akuapem.

His father, John Hall was born in Williamsfield, Jamaica in 1802 and was a rum distiller by occupation and Elder or Presbyter at the Irwinhill Moravian Church in Montego Bay. Mary Hall, his mother, was also born in Williamsfield in 1811 and was also a congregant at the Moravian church in Irwinhill, Montego Bay. When they arrived in colonial Ghana, John Hall was appointed the first Elder or Presbyter of the Christ Presbyterian Church, Akropong. John Hall performed a critical role in pioneering mission work with Christian converts at Akropong. Four of Peter Hall's siblings did not survive infancy in Jamaica and an additional five died after being born on the Gold Coast. Peter Hall had an older brother, Andrew, born on 18 January 1841 in Williamsfield. Andrew Hall later died in 1859 on the Gold Coast after a short spell in Germany. Hall's younger sister, the last child, Rebecca Hall (later Mrs. Clerk), born in August 1856, died in Christiansborg, Osu on the coast in 1920. The proclamation of emancipation that granted full freedom to slaves in the Commonwealth Realms of the British Empire was on 1 August 1838. In his autobiography, Peter Hall stated that his parents migrated to the Gold Coast as mission volunteers out of love for the Gospel of Jesus Christ and to prove to native Africans that there monogamous black Christians in the world. The West Indian group in 1843 comprised six distinct families and three bachelors: the Halls, Greenes, Miller, Mullings, Rochester, and Walkers, in addition to Clerk, Hosford and Robinson. On 27 May 1843, Mary Hall gave birth to a boy, Henry Hall at Frederiksgave, the old villa and royal plantation of the Danish Governor of the Gold Coast. The newly born child was baptised by the Basel missionary, Johann Georg Widmann who was part of the recruitment team that went to Jamaica in 1842, together with Andreas Riis and George Peter Thompson. Henry Hall became a teacher-catechist in service of the Basel Mission and died at Abomosu many years later. The West Indians relocated to Akropong from Frederiksgave between 17 and 18 June 1843. It took five years for the first African native at Akropong to be baptised and the Halls decided to permanently make the Gold Coast their home. The Basel Mission gave the Hall family land for gardening and farming as well as a stone house. Cocoyam, mango, coffee, banana, plantain and pear were seedlings introduced to the Gold Coast food economy by Peter Hall's father and his West Indian colleagues in 1843.

Peter Hall recalled his mother, Mary affectionately calling him, “Last baby; little bowl” as a child and he was always found tied to her apron strings. His father was described as very strict and often flogged Peter Hall's older siblings for the least misconduct. His parents who were regular churchgoers often prayed with the family at bedtime. He was made to read a Bible verse once he became literate as a child. The Hall family lived on Hanover Street in Akropong where all the other West Indians lived in small stone houses. In his recollection, he stated, “When I was young, I remember that a bond of unity bound all the West Indians together. Instead of “Mr.” they used “brother” when referring to one another. It was Bro. Clerk or Bro. Miller and so on, and we the children always addressed them as “Uncle so and so” or “Aunt so and so.” Among ourselves, we referred to one another as ‘sister’ or ‘brother’” The community of brethren is a key tenet of the Moravian movement, from which the West Indians were raised.

A notable incident in his childhood was the 1854 naval bombardment of Osu by the British forces as revenge for the organised resistance to the then newly introduced poll tax. Hall recalled the fleeing of refugees, mostly traders, from Osu to Akropong. The refugees founded their own settlement, “Kotobaabi” near the mission house where the women sold corn bread (abolo), deep fried plantain, fried cakes (tatale), corn porridge (mpampa), malt or corn wine (ahai), Bambara beans (aboboi), parched groundnuts and corn. The poll tax dispute spread to Akropong where a tax collector named Neils Holm visited the town frequently to collect the tax paid in cowries (ntrama), with twenty-five strings of cowries equaling a shilling and a penny.

In 1871, there was an outbreak of smallpox at Akropong. Peter Hall's parents and two brothers were afflicted by the infectious disease. Unfortunately, one brother, James Hall, who had a wife and a daughter, died from the smallpox outbreak.

== Education and training ==
Peter Hall was first homeschooled by his mother. He did not start school until 1859 when he was about eight due to his asthmatic condition which was cured by an Islamic cleric and herbalist. The Muslim healer, a friend of Peter's father, John Hall, frequently visited their home and offered to help Peter Hall prescribing a potion to be used over three days. After that episode, he had a bout of intermittent fever making him bedridden for weeks before a certain Mr. Wood, a tenant f his father gave him some medication. With the influence of the Basel missionary, Auer, the inspector of schools and a family friend of the Halls, Peter Hall enrolled in the local primary school. Initially, he disliked formal leaning but with time he came to enjoy schooling. He received instruction in reading, writing, arithmetic, Biblical studies, history, geography, science, music and religion. His teacher-catechists were alumni of the foundational or pioneer class of the Basel Mission Seminary, Akropong and included John Rochester (died in 1859), Paul Staudt Keteku, Philip Kwabi and Robert Miller. Flogging was an integral part of the enforcement of discipline in the Basel mission education experience. Many academically weak students fled the school after a short stay. In 1862, there was an earthquake at Akropong which terrified all pupils with the teacher almost jumping through the window. In September 1865, he entered the Basel Mission middle boarding school at Akropong which was under the headship of the Reverend Mader pending the arrival of the Rev. M. Bellon who was the incoming headmaster. He spent three years instead of the usual four to complete his education. Hall had an accelerated promotion to the fourth year as the original final year class had been dismissed for indiscipline. He was appointed the lamp lighter of the school, which made him exempt from his manual duties. His enjoyed studying Greek and devoted his free time to the study of the language. His tutor in Greek was the Rev. Simeon Koranteng. Peter Hall was also influenced by the no-nonsense disciplinarian and new principal, M. Bellon.

Peter Hall was confirmed on 16 February 1866 by the senior Basel missionary, the Rev. J. G. Widmann. Hall's chosen Scripture for the occasion was 2 Timothy 2:22: “So flee youthful passions and pursue righteousness, faith, love, and peace, along with those who call on the Lord from a pure heart.”

In 1868, Peter Hall entered the Basel Mission Seminary at Akropong to train as a teacher-catechist. The Rev. J. A. Mader was the principal at the time. Hall's classmates included W. Hyde, E. Ofori, W. Addo and Joshua Adaye. In his final year at the seminary, there was an outbreak of smallpox at Akropong and the college had to temporarily close down for four months. After the epidemic subsided, Peter Hall continued his studies and on 18 August 1872, he and his classmates were consecrated as teacher-catechists by the Rev. J. G. Widmann. One of his mentors, Johnson left him with the parting words, Matthew 16:24 “If any man will come after me let him deny himself and take up his cross and follow me.”

== Teaching and Christian mission ==
Peter Hall

Peter Hall and Joshua Adaye were appointed teachers at the Basel Mission boarding middle school at Akropong. Hall taught two classes and later became a housemaster. In 1878, after six years as a teacher catechist, Peter Hall was appointed the Itinerary Preachers’ Department for the whole of Akuapem. His duties involved preaching the Gospel in various towns and villages and submitting quarterly reports. He went to distant towns such as Nsakye and Nsawam, accompanied by the Rev. Dieterle. From 1880 to 1882, Peter Hall was appointed a catechist at Akropong where he was an assistant to the Rev. D. Eisenschmid. While at Akropong, he took three mission journeys to hinterland, at the invitation of the Rev. Joshua Miller. The first and second journeys were to the Kwahu area, where he met and worked with Rev. Fritz. Ramseyer who was later instrumental in the opening of a mission station in Asante. The third trip was to Buem and Akpafo. During one of the journeys, a heavy rainfall made him spending the night under an open hut sitting on his tin trunk as the ground was too wet for him to spread his mat.

In March 1882, Peter Hall was ordained a church minister, together with N. Asare, E. Obeng and Jermiah Anoba. The ceremony was conducted by the Rev. Eisenschmid, assisted by Solomon Safro, Missionary Weimer and the Rev. Karl Quist, his former housemaster at the pastor's seminary at Akropong. Karl Quist was also the father of the Emmanuel Charles Quist, a barrister and judge who became the first African President of the Gold Coast Legislative Council and the first Speaker of the Parliament of Ghana. Between 1882 and 1888, Hall was appointed the minister- in-charge of the Christ Presbyterian Church, Akropong. He encountered the Kete Krachi-imported deity, "Odente" during his ministry there. In 1888, he Peter Hall was appointed to the Volta District with his station being at Nkonya. He was received on friendly terms by the paramount chief, Okoto Kofi. Upon the advice of his friend Joshua Miller and with his help, he decided to settle in Ntsumuru due to its central location. He remained there as a preacher-missionary for the fourteen years. He went to Alavanyo to the east of Botoku and Sohae in the west. He went to towns such as Kpando, Anfoega, Buem and Vakpo. At Nkonya, he initially face opposition from the natives who worshipped idols including a heathen god called Sia. The local people nicknamed Hall “Anise” meaning 'father figure' in the local dialect. His converts include former voodoo priests and Sophia Ofusi who became the first female convert of the town and the mother of the first ordained pastor from Nkonya. With the help of the natives, he built schools and mission stations and mediated in an impasse that could have resulted in two wars. He baptised so many natives that there was no one willing to succeed the old fetish priest after the shaman died. Hall went many settlements such as Buem in 1891 and preached in many villages including Jasikan, Worawora, Guaman and Boradaa. Together, with his fellow second generation West Indian colleague, Nicholas Timothy Clerk, Peter Hall went to Adele and Salaga in the Northern Territories. He undertook another journey to Adele and Akebu with the Rev. P. H. Roesler who was a Basel missionary stationed at Aburi.

He was transferred to Tutu in 1902, where he enjoyed great tranquility for three years. After interceding in prayer for the paramount chief, Nana Akuffo, the locals accused him of meddling in a land dispute between the natives and the church. With tensions brewing, the Basel missionaries, the Rev. Samson and Dr. Fisch had to step in as mediators to settle the disagreement. However, there was so much resentment that the many new converts boycotted church services. The chapel was closed one Sunday and he went to preach at Obosomase. He was temporarily transferred to Larteh but had to return to Tutu as his family was being intimidated by the townsfolk. Traders refused to sell to his family. Someone fired a gun into their compound while a trader who had sold palm nuts to his wife returned to forcibly take them while they were boiling in a pot in their yard.

In January 1908, he was transferred to Adawso were natives were so receptive, he begged the church management to stay on when his tenure ended after five years. In February 1913, Peter Hall returned to Akropong, where his new colleagues mostly consisted of German missionaries.

== Moderator of the Presbyterian Church ==
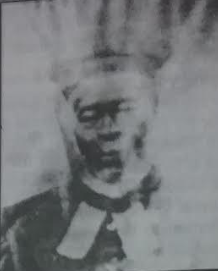
The Rev. Peter Hall

During World War I, the British colonial government expelled the Basel missionaries in 1917 as “alien security risk” on Gold Coast as many were of German and Swiss German heritage. This new development provided an opportunities for African members of the Basel Mission to take more administrative responsibility even though they had no prior experience in management. The Scottish mission of the Free Church of Scotland led by the Rev. A. W. Wilkie took over the mission's work in evangelism and education. The Scottish mission was then operating in nearby Nigeria.

The Presbyterian Scots decided to reorganize the church hierarchy and structure. A conference, the first Synod of the church was organised at Akropong. The Synod Committee elected Peter Hall as the first Moderator of Presbyterian Church of the Gold Coast on 14 August 1918. In effect, he became the chief executive of the national church organisation. The Synod Clerk position went to another second generation Jamaican missionary, Nicholas Timothy Clerk. At the 1918 Synod meeting, held at the Christ Presbyterian Church, Akropong, Peter Hall and Nicholas Clerk authored the first constitution of the Presbyterian Church of Ghana. At the Synod, the church retained its eleven districts: Christiansborg (Osu), Abokobi, Odumase-Krobo Aburi, Akropong, Anum, Kyebi, Begoro, Nsaba, Abetifi and Kumasi. At the 1922 Synod, the first five Presbyteries were created: Ga and Adangme; Akuapem and Anum; Agona and Kotoku; Akyem and Okwawu; Asante and Asante Akyem. Mission stations were opened at Aburi, Larteh, Odumase, Abokobi, Kyebi, Gyadam, Kwahu, Asante, Anum as well as the Northern territories including Yendi and Salaga. On 20 August 1922, after four years as the Moderator and fifty years of teaching and Christian ministry, Peter Hall retired from active service.

== Personal life ==
In 1874, he married a woman who he did not name in his autobiography. The Rev. Widmann officiated at the wedding ceremony. Three of their first four children passed away in infancy. The fourth child, John Hall survived childhood. Four more children were born but only three of those lived to adulthood.

== Works ==
- Hall, Peter (1965). Autobiography of the Rev. Peter Hall: First Moderator of the Presbyterian Church of Ghana. Accra: Waterville Publishing House

== Later life ==
Peter Hall spent his retirement years in his adopted hometown of Akropong.

== Death and legacy ==
Peter Hall died in 1937 at the age of eighty six. His funeral service was held at the Christ Presbyterian Church, Akropong and his body was interred at the old Basel Mission Cemetery in the town. Peter Hall's work in education and evangelism played a pioneering role in the expansion of literacy and the Christian faith across communities in the country, both of which brought poverty alleviation and helped improve livelihoods in rural communities on the Gold Coast. Peter Hall's name is on a commemorative plaque in the sanctuary of the Ebenezer Presbyterian Church, Osu, listing pioneering missionaries of the church, in recognition of their contributions to formal education and Christian ministry in Ghana. The Presbyterian Church at Nkonya Wurpong, was named the Peter Hall Congregation in his honour.
