= Catherine Mulgrave =

Angolan-Jamaican Moravian educator and missionary

Catherine Elisabeth Mulgrave
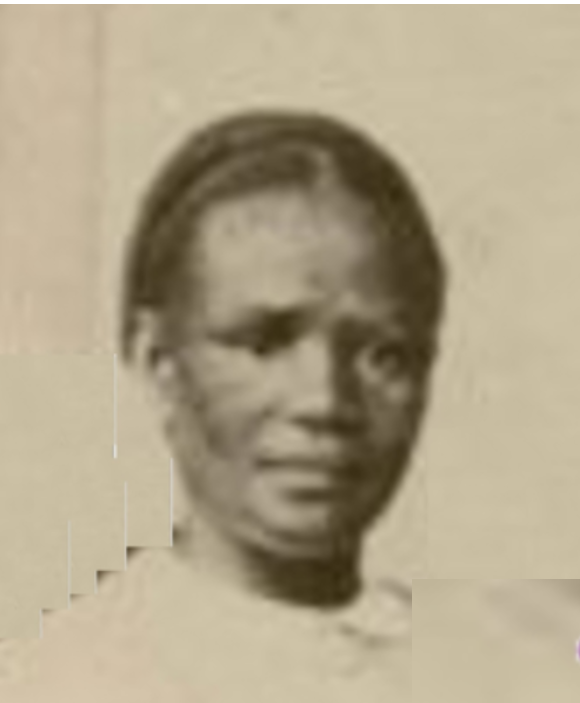
- Catherine Mulgrave, c. 1873
- Born: Gewe; 19 November 1827; Luanda, Angola
- Died: 14 January 1891 (aged 63); Accra, Gold Coast
- Education: Female Refuge School, Fairfield, Manchester Parish; Mico Institution
- Occupations: Schoolteacher; Education administrator; Missionary
- Known for: Pioneer woman in mission education and Christian ministry on the Gold Coast; Empowerment of women on the Gold Coast
- Spouses: George Peter Thompson (m. 1842; div. 1849); Johannes Zimmermann (m. 1851; died 1876)
- Children: 8
- Parents: Constantine Henry Phipps, 1st Marquess of Normanby (foster father); Maria Liddell, Lady Mulgrave (foster mother)

Catherine Elisabeth Mulgrave also Gewe (19 November 1827 – 14 January 1891) was an Angolan-born Jamaican Moravian pioneer educator, administrator and missionary who accompanied a group of 24 Caribbean mission recruits from Jamaica and Antigua and arrived in the Danish Protectorate of Christiansborg, now Osu, Accra in Ghana in 1843. Mulgrave was a leading figure in pedagogy and the education programme for girls in both Jamaica and on the Gold Coast. She was the Basel Mission’s first female teacher active on the Gold Coast. Under the auspices of the society, she played a pioneering role in the Christian women's ministry of the Protestant movement in colonial Ghana. Catherine Mulgrave was also one of the first African woman teachers in the missionary educationalist system in Africa.

== Early life and education ==
=== Childhood and kidnapping ===
Catherine Mulgrave was born in Luanda, Angola, circa 1827. Some scholars such as the Swiss German church historian, Hans Werner Debrunner posited that Mulgrave may have been born earlier in around 1825 or in 1826. Other records list 1820 and 1822. However, records at the Basel Mission Archives list her exact date of birth as 19 November 1827. Her father was a prince, the son of an African traditional chief who worked as an assistant to a merchant in their port town. Other sources state that her father was a respected African Christian merchant with European influences. Her mother, Sophina was a baptised mulatress who belonged to a Christian family of Catholic origin – most likely Euro-African of Portuguese and indigenous African descent. Since the 15th century, circa 1450, the Portuguese had a long-established presence on the Angolan coast through commerce and trade with the BaKongo Empire. Mulgrave recalled her mother calling her by the Angolan name “Gewe” (pronounced "Geve") as a child. It is said that her European maternal grandfather had his entire family, including his eleven daughters, one son and grandchildren, both Portuguese and African, vaccinated against smallpox. The port town of Luanda was described as, “A seaside town with a large church, a school, two forts, great European houses. (...) The city itself has a governor, a bishop, monks [with] various cowls, vestments, choirboys, images of saints, holy water." When she was about five years old in April 1833, Gewe and her two cousins, while playing and fishing on the beach one early evening, were abducted by Portuguese slave traders on the coast of São Paulo da Assunção de Loanda, now Luanda. The slave traders arrived in a small boat with some sailors and attempted to lure the three children with sweets. One child managed to run away before she could be captured into the boat. The sailors paddled their boat to an anchored slave ship nearby, the Heroina where the two girls were greeted by a friendly captain, "Sabin from St. Thomas" who was also a slave trader. The two girl prisoners were kept in the captain's cabin. Hundreds of captives, estimated to be about 303, were in the ship and the two girls witnessed the brutality visited upon prisoners who tried to break free. That night, the ship sailed from the Angolan coast, heading for Havana, Cuba. After a few weeks, land came into view. British colonial authorities patrolling the high seas inspected the ship but they did not discover the slaves who were hidden in a basement. Near the southern Jamaican coast, a tropical storm alarmed and distressed everyone aboard the Portuguese schooner - the vessel crushed against a rock and began leaking before it eventually sunk. Some swam to safety on the shore while others clung to the wooden mast as they waited to be rescued. Gewe and her cousin were among the few survivors rescued from the wreckage and taken to Old Harbour, Saint Catherine Jamaica. The captain of the ship with his crew of kidnappers were arrested by the British authorities in Jamaica and jailed in Kingston as the system of slavery was already in the early phase of abolishment. The "apprenticeship act", granting immediate and full freedom to children six years of age and younger, and an intermediate status for those older, was also enacted 1833, kicking off the step-by-step abolishment of the system of slavery in Jamaica. The surviving captives aboard the Portuguese vessel were set free. Earlier in 1831/32, a bloody slave rebellion on the island had kicked off the struggle towards freedom. The official Act of Emancipation came into full force throughout the West Indies on 1 August 1834.

=== Teenage years ===
The two girls were adopted by the then Governor of Jamaica between 1832 and 1834, Earl of Mulgrave (1797–1863) and his wife, Maria Liddell, Lady Mulgrave Maria Liddell (1798–1882) who later became Lady Normanby and had just returned from Britain on a short trip. The Earl of Mulgrave was created Marquess of Normanby in 1835 and was styled as Constantine Henry Phipps, 1st Marquess of Normanby. The Mulgraves gave the two girls their surname and Gewe was given her adoptive mother's name. In the first few months at the Governor's official residence in Spanish Town, they were home-schooled by the Governor's wife who was a devout Christian, most likely of Anglican faith. In 1833, the Earl and Lady Mulgrave were on an official visit to inspect the Female Refuge School in Fairfield, Manchester Parish. Between 1831 and 1837, the Moravian Church in Jamaica and the Cayman Islands increased its general operations in evangelism and educational initiatives in the West Indies. The Moravians sought to educate liberated slaves under the apprenticeship system. The refuge school had been established a year earlier in 1832 by English Moravian women missionaries. The school population had 24 orphan girls, who came from all over the island to attend the institution. Catherine Mulgrave and her cousin were sent to the boarding school. She spent five and a half years at the girls’ school. In January 1834, the Governor and Lady Mulgrave left Jamaica. They had wished to take Catherine and her cousin with them, but Lady Mulgrave suffered from sporadic illness and upon medical advice, the Mulgraves decided to leave them in Jamaica. Furthermore, the Clerk of the Mulgraves advised them against taking Catherine to England due to climatic conditions. They nonetheless maintained correspondence with Catherine and regularly remitted funds for her upkeep in Jamaica. After separation from her Victorian aristocratic foster family, Catherine Mulgrave was taken in by the Moravian mission in Fairfield, Manchester Parish. Catherine Mulgrave then proceeded to the Mico Institution in Kingston, Jamaica for teacher-training. Persistent illness forced her to leave the normal school after just nine months.

== Contributions to education ==
=== Teaching in Jamaica ===
She was recruited as a teacher by a mission school in Bethlehem a Moravian colony in Malvern, Jamaica, Jamaica where she stayed a Moravian missionary couple for three years, until 1842. At the Bethlehem Moravian school she taught at, it is estimated that enrollment was between 50 and 100 pupils. It was fairly customary then to use pupil teachers between 14 and 18 years to teach younger children.

=== Work on the Gold Coast ===
In 1842, she joined 24 missionaries from Antigua and Jamaica recruited by Andreas Riis of the Basel Mission to aid the missionary entreprise on the Gold Coast. There were theological similarities between the Basel Mission and the Moravian Church due to their shared Lutheran heritage. The Basel mission group that came to Jamaica also included missionary, Johann Georg Widmann, Americo-Liberian and first African Basel missionary, George Peter Thompson as well as Riis’ wife, Anna Wolters Riis. The recruitment of Afro-descendants had been successfully carried out by other European missionary societies in Anglophone West African countries like Sierra Leone. In the view of the Basel Home Committee, Afro-West Indians were better suited to acclimatise to the West African climate in comparison to their European counterparts who often succumbed to death from tropical diseases. Furthermore, the presence of West Indians from the then British and Danish-controlled Caribbean islands, would prove to native Africans that there were indeed black Christians in the world.

On arrival in the Gold Coast colony, the Caribbean recruits relocated to Akropong. Riis and Thompson had regular misunderstandings and it was decided by the mission station to transfer George Thompson, together with his young bride, Catherine to Christiansborg to establish and English-language school on the coast. On 27 November 1843, a boys’ boarding middle school, the Salem School opened at Christiansborg, the oldest existing school founded by the Basel Mission. The founding schoolteachers were George Thompson, Catherine Mulgrave and young Jamaican teacher, Alexander Worthy Clerk who was part of the same group of 24 Moravian Caribbean emigrants who had earlier arrived in April 1843. Salem's school curriculum was rigorous: It included English and Ga languages, arithmetic, geography, history, religious knowledge, nature study, hygiene, handwriting and music. There was also artisanal training, including pottery, carpentry, basket and mat weaving and practical lessons in agriculture in the school garden. The first batch had 41 pupils: 34 boys and 7 girls and the first classes were held in rented premises. The school later moved to the mission house originally owned by the Danish governor which stood at the centre of the Osu coastal village and contained ground floor rooms for the school and management. On the upper floor, there were missionary apartments, girls’ school and teachers’ quarters.

Around the same time, Mulgrave became the founder, the first principal and director of the Basel Mission-operated girls’ school at the previously Danish-run Christiansborg Castle School in Osu, Accra. The Basel missionary, Andreas Riis initially opposed the handover of the castle school to the Basel mission as he claimed the school's alumnae would become “future concubines” for educated civil servants in the colonial administration. The Danes sold their forts to the British in 1850. The Christiansborg Castle School, as well as the British-owned Cape Coast Castle school, established in the eighteenth century by the Church of England’s Society for the Propagation of the Gospel in Foreign Parts (SPG) largely served the mulatto population in both jurisdictions. The castle schools were approved by the European Governors to primarily educate the Euro-African children of European men and Gold Coast African women. The children often went on to become administrative assistants in the colonial civil service. Furthermore, a girls’ school had been founded in Cape Coast in 1821 and later on, Wesleyan Methodist missionaries set another female-only school in 1836 which is now the Wesley Girls’ High School.

In around March 1847, the Committee of the Basel Women’s Association which had no previous contact with Mulgrave, contacted her first husband, George Peter Thompson - an acknowledgement of her singular effort, initiative and ingenuity to establish a thriving girls’ school in difficult circumstances. The school flourished academically and as school administrator, Mulgrave ran the school efficiently. It is apparent Mulgrave did not face prejudice in her leadership role which provided stability for the mission station at Christiansborg.

Between 1843 and 1891, Mulgrave also established various specialist boarding schools for girls at Osu (1843), Abokobi (1855) and Odumase (1859) in spite of a scarcity of resources, with curricula that emphasised Christian training, arithmetic, reading, writing, needlework, gardening and household chores. Pupils were trained in practical skills such as vinegar making, soap making, starch and flour production.

Catherine Mulgrave was an inspiration to and mentored several pioneering women educators such as Regina Hesse and Rose Ann Miller. As the matriarch of the mission station at Christiansborg, she also mentored numerous young single women in her school entreprise. Catherine Mulgrave mastered the Ga language, German and the southern German dialect, Swabian German or Schwäbisch, spoken in her second husband, Johannes Zimmermann’s hometown, Gerlingen.

== Women’s Christian ministry ==
As a missionary in her own right, Catherine Mulgrave became a Christian evangelist to the urban women population at Christiansborg. In 1848, she assembled girls and young women at Osu to form the first recorded group of the “Women’s Class” or “Women’s Fellowship” – a signature feature of the present-day Presbyterian Church of Ghana called the Presbyterian Women's Fellowship. The 1848 gathering was to learn more about Christianity, the sharing or exchange of spirituality and sisterhood of the faith. This women's fellowship was a model borrowed from the Moravian Church in Jamaica as believers of the denomination there referred to one another as brethren, which encompassed the sisterhood. The Moravians in Jamaica also practised an organisation of choirs or units in which Christian-based education was promulgated.

== Personal life ==
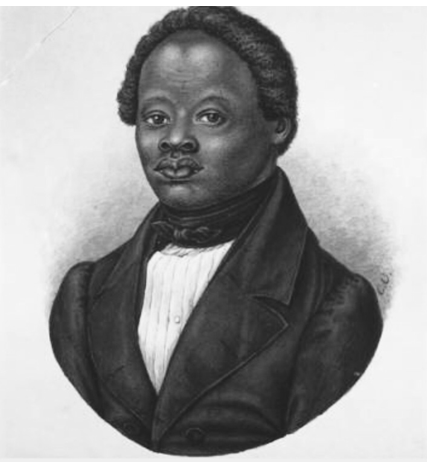
Mulgrave's first husband, George Peter Thompson

In 1842, when the Basel Mission recruitment team visited Jamaica, Americo-Liberian, George Peter Thompson fell in love with the then 16-year old Catherine Mulgrave. Born in 1819, Thompson was orphaned as a child, he was taken to Europe by the Basel missionary, the Rev. J. F. Sessing. He was raised in a Beuggen mission house in Baden-Wurttemberg, Germany, from where the Pietist movement originated. Thompson had been educated as a mission assistant in Basel Mission training school and seminary in Basel, Switzerland. Upon the recommendation of the Moravian mission and the tacit approval of the Basel mission, Mulgrave though initially undecided accepted Thompson's proposal. It is on record that her patroness, Lady Mulgrave, who she was still in contact with, opposed to the union but before she could voice her concerns, the Basel team had already left for the Gold Coast, together with the recruited Caribbean missionaries and Mulgrave who had then married Thompson on 11 December 1842. Catherine Mulgrave had suffered a miscarriage on the voyage from the West Indies to Africa. Thompson and Mulgrave had their first child, a girl named Rosina in 1844. In 1846, she gave birth to her second child, a son baptised George.

In December 1846, it was disclosed through mutual surveillance by another Basel missionary that Mulgrave's husband, Thompson was having multiple extra-marital affairs, allegedly with the schoolgirls at Mulgrave's institution and also with Ga-Dangme women at Christiansborg. Thompson had also become haughty and an alcoholic. The scandal was a huge embarrassment to Catherine Mulgrave. Thompson was effectively put on probation as a missionary for approximately 18 months and was stripped of his position as a schoolmaster at Salem and transferred to Akropong, under close supervision by Basel missionaries, Widmann, Roes, Dieterle, Mohr and others. Meanwhile, Mulgrave stayed on the coast where she continued to run the school and raise their two children. The Inspector of the Basel Mission, Wilhelm Hoffmann wrote to Mulgrave in 1847 to inquire about Thompson's lapses, to which she elicited sympathy for her husband, in spite of his infidelity.

Thompson had another affair which was discovered in June 1849. After much probing, Thompson admitted to these affairs which violated his Basel Mission contract. He wrote his statement in the mission house, witnessed the Basel missionary Johannes Stanger. Thompson and Mulgrave officially divorced on 10 July 1849, in the presence of a Danish colonial government official. In the legal documentation for separation, it was recorded that she first filed for divorce and as stipulated by the mission won full custody of the children and could remarry if she desired. In the event of her death, the mission would take care of her children. As a single mother with young children to feed, she found it difficult to live on her meagre teacher's salary as her ex-husband had been expelled from the mission and had left the Gold Coast. The Basel missionaries on the Gold Coast petitioned the Home Committee on her behalf, detailing her financial difficulties and requesting for debt forgiveness for unpaid loans from the mission, relating to essential needs for her children.

She wrote to the newly appointed Basel Inspector, Joseph Josenhans on 28 February 1850 asking him to intercede on her behalf, as the dissolution of her marriage had caused pain and distress in her heart. Ten months later in December 1850, she wrote a follow-up letter to the Inspector about her continuing financial challenges. A month earlier in November 1850, Josenhans wrote to the missionary Dieterle, stating his openness to Mulgrave marrying one of the unmarried European Basel missionaries, though he knew the Home Committee forbade such a union. In the letter, he also extolled Mulgrave's “gifted mind” and “decided piety.”

According to the German church historian and Lutheran pastor, Ulrike Sill, it is probable Mulgrave contemplated leaving the Basel Mission for the Wesleyan Methodist mission for higher pay. After her divorce, a Wesleyan Methodist missionary, possibly Henry Wharton, had expressed interest in Catherine Mulgrave through the missionary Johannes Stanger. Stanger discouraged the potential union, citing its possibility to generate malicious gossip. Stanger also wrote to the Home Committee on 10 October 1850, suggesting remarriage for Mulgrave.

The European bachelor-missionaries living on the Gold Coast at the time included Akropong-based Johann Adam Mader as well as Wilhelm Locher and Johannes Zimmermann in Christiansborg. A resident on the Gold Coast since April 1850, Zimmermann was a linguist who was instrumental in the translation of the Bible into the Ga language. He had been critically ill shortly after his arrival from acute dysentery before receiving treatment from a traditional healer.

On 5 June 1851, Johannes Zimmermann married Catherine Mulgrave. The marriage had the support of other Basel missionaries living on the Gold Coast. The Mission Society in Basel was shocked and displeased by this marriage because Zimmermann had not consulted with the Home Committee. Facing possible expulsion from the Basel Mission for marrying a divorced African woman, Zimmermann bragged, "I am marrying Africa...well, the African liana has climbed the German oak tree." He was essentially prepared to face any consequence for a decision he considered immutable. As punishment for willfully breaching his contract, the Home Committee, suspended Zimmermann from his official post as a European missionary, and restricted his privilege of going on his annual leave home in Europe, a benefit of being an expatriate missionary. The original contract for all Basel missionaries, drafted by Inspector Johann Christoph Blumhardt in 1837, stipulated that after seminary training in Basel for only unmarried men, the new missionary had to prove himself in the field for two years before asking permission from the Basel board to get married. Thus, Zimmermann became a local missionary on the Gold Coast for the next twenty-two years. In 1852, Johannes Zimmermann set up catechist-training seminary at Christiansborg.

Zimmermann and Mulgrave made the Gold Coast their home. They had six children but only five, two daughters and three sons lived to adulthood. Their first child, Johanna was born in 1852. The second child, Johannes was born 1854. Their second daughter, Auguste Amalia, born in Christiansborg in 1858, was named after August and Amalie Steinhauser, a German missionary couple. Auguste Amalia was educated in Wurttemberg, Germany and became a teacher at the Basel Mission Girls’ Boarding School at Aburi. Between 1889 and 1892, she was a mission teacher at the Christiansborg Girls’ School. Mulgrave's son Gottfried, born in Odumase in 1861, later became an employee of the Basel Mission. Their last child Christoph was born in 1866. In 1871, Mulgrave's two eldest sons Johannes and Gottfried were sent to the mission house in Basel. Auguste Zimmermann was twice married to mission merchants. She first married Josua Leuze, a merchant with the company called Victor in 1883. Leuze joined the NMG in 1885 and was transferred to the Basel Mission in 1886 where he worked until his death in 1888. She then married the Basel missionary, Oskar Thal in 1892, becoming widowed for the second time in 1896. She returned to Germany and died in Korntal in 1923.

Johannes Zimmermann's dream of creating a Germano-African agricultural settlement in Abokobi never came to fruition although his descendants still live in Ghana. Additionally, his own children and brother, Christoph, also married African spouses. A few Mulgrave-Zimmermann's descendants are still in Germany as some of their children remained in Gerlingen and Korntal after the death of Zimmermann.

== Later years ==
=== Missionary-wife ===
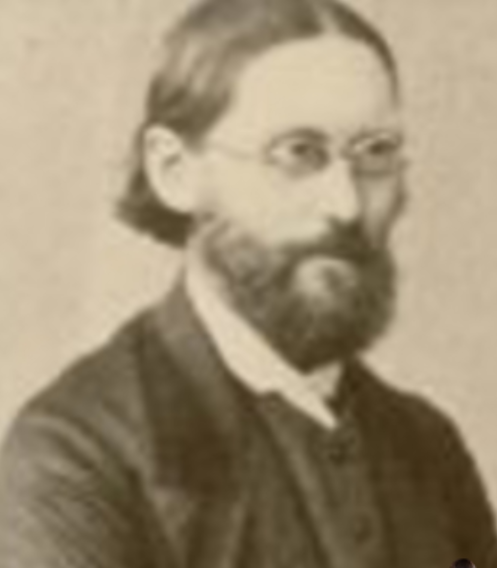
Mulgrave's second husband, Johannes Zimmermann

Mulgrave continued to manage the girls’ at Christiansborg she founded. She was later transferred to be a housemistress of a new girls’ boarding school in the same town. Upon the suggestion of Basel missionaries in Christiansborg, Mulgrave started a prayer meeting for women in Christiansborg in 1854. She also ran the missionary household which included her mentee, a Euro-African teacher, Regina Hesse and Zimmermann's Euro-African linguist assistant as well as their children. As the household matriarch, she was lauded for her culinary skills, specialising in cuisine from the Gold Coast, Germany and Jamaica. They often invited their neighbours to their home to share her freshly baked pancakes.

After the 1854 bombardment of Christiansborg by the H. M. S. Scourge, following the riots against the British poll tax ordinance, Zimmermann sought refuge at the Methodist mission house in Accra. Together with his family and students, he was evacuated to Abokobi, 15 miles (24 kilometres) inland from Accra where, with the assistance of another missionary, August Steinhauser, he set up a small Christian village community. At Abokobi, Catherine Mulgrave established a girls’ boarding school before staying briefly at Akropong. In 1858, the Zimmermann-Mulgrave household returned to Christiansborg and Catherine became a missionary wife again and resumed leading the weekly women's prayer meetings, usually held on Tuesday evening. Catherine Mulgrave gained respect from other missionary wives like Amalie Steinhauser who was on friendly terms with her. Mrs. Steinhauser had within that period lost her husband, the Basel missionary, August Steinhauser. Catherine and Amalie jointly paid regular house visits to women congregants of the church in Christiansborg.

Mulgrave challenged the edict of two European unmarried teachers who were co-heads at the girls’ boarding school, Wilhelmine Maurer and Katharina Ruedi who wanted to abolish the social system where pupils helped their teachers in doing household chores. In 1860, Mulgrave and her husband were posted to Odumase, where once again she started a girls’ boarding school. At Odumase, they lived in the heart of the town as they wanted to be closer to the indigenous people.

=== Controversies ===
In 1871, the wife of missionary Klaiber died suddenly and Catherine Mulgrave was accused by the missionary of poisoning his wife. Another missionary, Weber also accused Zimmerman of financial irregularities, pertaining to disbursement of mission funds. Senior missionaries appointed by the Basel board exonerated them. From 1860s onwards, the Home Committee softened its stance and attempted to recall him for furlough in order to be re-socialised into European culture but like Jon Miller's “strategic deviant” concept, he rebuffed these calls. The Basel board felt he had become ‘too Africanised’ due to his marriage to Mulgrave and long stay on the Gold Coast.

=== Life in Europe ===
In 1870s, Catherine's husband began to have bouts of exhaustion and illness. In the spring of 1872, he went to Gerlingen with his whole family to recuperate for a year. On their return to the Gold Coast in 1873, they lived and worked at Abokobi until 1876, when they moved to Christiansborg. Shortly thereafter, Zimmermann fell ill again, and returned to Gerlingen, Germany with Catherine Mulgrave via Basel, Switzerland in September 1876, where he died at the end of the same year, on 13 December 1876, at the age of fifty-one. Accompanied by her three younger children, Mulgrave then returned to the Gold Coast in the spring of 1877 as a missionary widow and lived at Christiansborg, her longtime adopted home, until her death, fourteen years later, in 1891.

=== Final years ===
She then permanently settled in Christiansborg where she continued to be active in women's evangelism and the women's class, visiting its members in their homes to share the Gospel. As a missionary, she witnessed the death-bed conversion and baptism of a former houseboy of Andreas Riis.

== Death and legacy ==
Catherine Mulgrave died of pneumonia in Christiansborg on 14 January 1891 and her body was buried at the Basel Mission Cemetery in Osu, Accra. Commenting on her pioneering role in women's empowerment through education and evangelisation in a largely patriarchal environment, the Gold Coast historian and Basel Mission pastor, Carl Christian Reindorf described her as “our spiritual mother.” Many of her pupils went on to become Christian wives to new African Christians who formed the nucleus of the emerging clergy and catechist class of the Gold Coast. Her second marriage also reflected the successful symbiosis of cultures, in this case, African-Caribbean and European, as well as religious traditions, Pietist and Jamaican Moravian which created a “golden bridge” for intercultural relations, in spite of a rigid or absolute system that separated the living arrangements of the two groups in nineteenth century colonial Ghana.
