= Rose Ann Miller =

Jamaican educator

- Born: 16 March 1836; Pepper Plantage, Fairfield, Manchester Parish, Jamaica
- Died: 1930 (aged 93–94); Accra, Gold Coast
- Education: United Akropong School; Basel Mission Girls' School, Akropong
- Occupations: Schoolteacher; Education administrator; Missionary
- Known for: Pioneer in women's education on the Gold Coast; Empowerment of women on the Gold Coast
- Parents: Joseph Miller (father); Mary Miller (mother)

Rose Ann Miller (16 March 1836 – 1930) was a Jamaican-born educator pioneer who worked extensively on the Gold Coast in both Basel Mission and government-run schools. As a child in 1843, Miller relocated to the Gold Coast with her parents and siblings, as part of a group of 24 West Indian settlers recruited by the Danish minister, Andreas Riis and the Basel Mission to augment evangelism efforts in Ghana.

== Early life and education ==
Rose Ann Miller was born on 16 March 1836 on Pepper Plantage in Fairfield, Jamaica, to Joseph Miller (born 1800), a farm worker and his wife, Mary Miller (born 1811), both of whom were freed slaves. Her parents were both congregants of the Fairfield Moravian Church, started on 1 January 1826, in Fairfield near Spur Tree in Manchester Parish, Jamaica. She had two younger siblings, brother Robert Miller (born 29 May 1839) and sister, Catherine Miller (born 1 July 1842) both on Pepper Plantage. In spring 1843, a seven-year old Rose Ann Miller joined her parents, siblings and twenty other Moravian Christian compatriots to sail to the Gold Coast under the aegis of the Basel Evangelical Missionary Society. The society's team of recruiters included Johann Georg Widmann, George Peter Thompson and Andreas Riis, all ordained missionaries. Shortly after their arrival in Christiansborg in April 1843, Rose Ann Miller and the rest of the West Indians relocated to Akropong and lived on Hanover Street, an area of town with a mango tree-lined street and little stone houses where all the other Caribbean families lived. It is said that “a bond of unity bound all the West Indians together” and in the Moravian tradition, they referred to one other as ‘brother’ and ‘sister’. In 1848, the United Akropong School was founded by Alexander Worthy Clerk, one of the Jamaican missionaries. The inaugural class had thirty-seven girls, twenty-five boys and seven children of the West Indians. Other West Indian children who were taught at the school included Andrew Hall, Robert Miller, Catherine Miller, Elizabeth Mullings, Ann Rochester and John Rochester. The pupils nicknamed Clerk, "Suku Mansere" which was a corruption of "schoolmaster" in the Twi language.

== Career ==
=== Work in education ===
In 1848, twelve-year old Rose Ann Miller assisted Rosina Widmann at the newly established Girls Boarding School at Akropong where she interacted with young girl converts who struggled to come to terms with discrepancies between old cultural norms and new Christian rules. In 1854, she became an assistant teacher there. In 1857, she was appointed the head of the infant girls’ school at Akropong. In 1859, Rose Ann Miller started the girls’ boarding school at Aburi, predecessor to the present-day Aburi Girls’ Secondary School, fulfilling both her teaching and administrative duties until 1874. The Basel Mission hierarchy did not permit African teachers to superintend European staff. This meant that between 1861 and 1873, Rose Ann Miller was officially subordinate to the midwife, Julie Mohr, spouse of Basel missionary, Joseph Mohr. Nonetheless, Julie Mohr and Rose Ann Miller “formed a collegial relationship.” Anytime, Mohr travelled for midwifery work, it was Miller who ran the school as the headmistress. Growing up in Akropong, Miller mastered the Akuapem-Twi language and became accustomed to local customs.

In 1870, Miller visited Cape Coast and was offered a teaching post of £73 per annum. In contrast, her annual salary with the Basel mission was only £16 in 1874. The Cape Coast offer was on par with a Wesleyan mission and a government-employed teacher's salary of £25 and £24 respectively in 1875 while a government headmistress in the same city made £72. In 1873, the Mohr couple permanently returned to Europe. They interceded on Miller's behalf at the Basel headquarters for the Home Committee to reduce her workload at the same salary. The home board rejected that idea saying a lighter teaching schedule would go with lower pay. Disappointed, Miller left the Basel Mission at the end of the 1873/4 year to work as an employee of the colonial government at the then newly opened Government Girls’ School at Accra, where one of her colleagues was Caroline Svanikier (née Clerk), daughter of one of the West Indians, Alexander Worthy Clerk.

=== Entrepreneurial initiatives ===
Miller purchased a coffee farm in the early 1860s with the aim of raising funds locally using financial proceeds from farm produce to supplement her meagre teacher's salary. Though she did not seek permission from the Aburi mission station head, the Basel missionary, Johann Dieterle, she was left unpunished as her initiative showed a sense of purpose–a summation of Jon Miller's concept of “strategic deviant.” In another entrepreneurial move, she donated sixty coffee seedlings to the Aburi girls’ boarding school farm. She also made extra income through needle-work by being a part-time seamstress or dressmaker. In 1864, she received a letter of commendation from the St. Petersburg Women’s Association, recognising her as an exemplar of economic independence who pursued filial piety for her ageing parents. Income from cash-crop farming was sometimes used to support her parents when they ran into financial difficulties. However, her farm made use of a domestic worker who was eventually given to her mother, Mary Miller in 1863. Her brother, Robert Miller was dismissed by the Basel Mission for an infraction and later took over the management of the coffee farm.

== Personal life ==
Rose Ann Miller remained unmarried throughout her life due to drama and disagreements by the relevant parties involved in the marriage-making decision: her father, Joseph Miller, the European Basel missionaries, potential suitors and herself. A prospective bridegroom, Alexander Worthy Clerk refused to marry her when her father, Joseph Miller approached him because Clerk did not want to be his son-in-law. Moreover, Joseph Miller was seen as a “difficult character.”

Later, when Rose Ann Miller was eighteen years old, an arranged marriage in 1854 to Antiguan, Jonas Horsford was called off after the missionary couple, Johann and Rosina Widmann intervened in the matter. Joseph Miller wrote a complaint letter to the Home Committee in Basel after this episode. Another possible future spouse, Jonathan Palmer Bekoe was rejected by her parents because as a Christian convert, Bekoe came from a native Akan polygamous family that practised matrilineal inheritance with fewer rights granted to non-Akan wives. The Millers were afraid their daughter will become a domestic slave under the matrilineal system in Akan society. Bekoe was in the pioneer class of the Basel Mission Seminary, Akropong and trained as a teacher-catechist, linguist and translator working with German missionary and philologist, Johann Gottlieb Christaller to translate the Bible into the Twi language. He also worked with his fellow Akan linguists, David Asante, Theophilus Opoku and Paul Staudt Keteku.

The emerging Euro-African coastal elite was also a source of finding a future husband. However, Rose Ann's father, Joseph viewed the Euro-African mulatto men as philanderers who were unfit for long-term stable marriage. The final group of potential future spouses was the European Basel missionaries, including Johann Gottlieb Christaller. According to the Millers, the missionaries had favourable attributes like “monogamous traditions, strict control… stable income and privileged position on the mission field.” No positive outcome came from this last option leading Rose Ann Miller to write a complaint to the then presiding Basel missionary of the Akropong station, Johann Georg Widmann, using parables alluding to funerals and motifs of social rank to lament her position. Widmann saw the idea of Miller marrying a Basel missionary as “foolish”. A series of related events which Widmann reported to the Home Committee as provocative led to the suspension of Rose Ann Miller from her teaching post in 1856. Her mother, Mary Miller intervened and contacted, Henry Wharton, a Wesleyan missionary in Jamestown, British Accra who employed her at the Methodist School there after conferring with the Basel missionaries. In 1858, J. G. Christaller and the Home Committee discouraged another potential Basel missionary suitor, Johann Ludwig Haas from marrying Miller as they considered it a “not really desirable development”. Haas eventually found a Swiss bride.

== Death and legacy ==
Rose Ann Miller died of natural causes in Accra in 1930 at the age of ninety-four. As an educator and a school principal, she mentored several young women in the hinterlands. She acted as a spiritual figurehead in social motherhood and economic independence – both key aspects of the modern day concept of Presbyterian womanhood – a philosophy that can be linked directly to Rose Ann Miller's life and work on the Gold Coast.
