= The History of the Gold Coast and Asante =

Preserved work of oral tradition

- Title page for The History of the Gold Coast and Asante (1895)
- Author: Carl Christian Reindorf Hackenburg
- Language: Ga; English
- Genre: History
- Publisher: Ghana University Press
- Publication date: 1895
- Publication place: Ghana
- Pages: 388
- ISBN: 9789964303556

The History of the Gold Coast and Asante is a preserved work of oral tradition by Carl Christian Reindorf (1834–1917) and considered a pioneering work and a "historical classic" and entirely written in English and Ga language. He completed his work in 1889 and published in 1895 in Basel.

== Background ==
The work was a full-length Western-style history of a region in Africa by the first African that was published. The work was inspired by the publishing work of his colleague Johann Gottlieb Christaller in preserving oral tradition. J. G. Christaller during his time in Ghana in the third quarter of the nineteenth century worked on extensively on oral tradition. In preserving an oral tradition, the history of Gold Coast and Asante won a permanent place in the annals of African history.

== Synopsis ==
The book has 29 chapters arranged chronologically. The book covers the period BC 600–750 and 1400–1700 with short description of " Gold Coast; the Kingdom of Guinea; expeditions sent by Pharaoh Necho and the Carthiginians; F. Romber’s reference to the Kingdom of Benin; traditional accounts of emigration to the coast; tribes assumed to have been the aboriginal races on the coast, and their conquest".

The final chapter covers the period 1851–1856: "administration of justice according to English law & its effects; imposition & collection methods of a poll tax, and conspiracy to refuse payment; bombardment of Christiansborg, Labadi and Teshi; peace and the rebuilding of Christiansborg."

== Purpose ==
The purpose of the book as stated by the author:

- Need for such history by a Ghanaian
- conscious of the customs and tradition of Ghana.

== Significance ==
The customs and their usage in the book are relevant to interpretation of Law as an authority in the Law Courts of Ghana.

== Editions ==
- Reindorf, Carl (2007). History of the Gold Coast and Asante. Accra: Ghana Universities Press. ISBN 978-9964-3-0355-6. OCLC 191820066.
- Reindorf, Carl Christian (2015-02-20). History of the Gold Coast and Asante. - Scholar's Choice Edition. Creative Media Partners, LLC. ISBN 978-1-298-46441-5.
