= Carl Christian Reindorf =

Ghanaian pastor and historian

The Reverend Carl Christian Reindorf
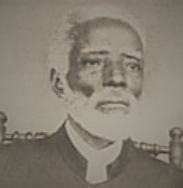
- Carl Christian Reindorf
- Born: Carl Christian Reindorf; 31 May 1834; Accra, Gold Coast
- Died: 1 July 1917 (aged 83); Accra, Gold Coast
- Education: Basel Mission
- Occupations: Historian; Minister
- Spouse: Juliana Ayikai Mansah Djebi (m. 1856)
- Writing career
- Language: English; Ga

Orders
- Ordination: 13 October 1872, Basel Mission, Gold Coast

Carl Christian Reindorf (31 May 1834 – 1 July 1917) was a Euro-African-born pioneer historian and pastor who worked with the Basel Mission on the Gold Coast. A teacher, farmer, trader, traditional medicine physician, he wrote The History of the Gold Coast and Asante in the Ga language; scholars consider the book a "culturally important" work and an increasingly important source for Ghanaian history. The work was later translated into English and published in 1895 in Switzerland. He used written sources and oral tradition, interviewing more than 200 people in the course of assembling his history.

== Biography ==
=== Early life and education ===
Reindorf was born in Prampram, Gold Coast, a palm oil trading port He was the only son of Carl Christian Reindorf Hackenburg (1806–1865), a soldier of half-Danish heritage, and Hannah Anowah Ama Cudjoe Reindorf (1811-1902), an ethnic Ga from Kinka, Dutch Accra. Carl Reindorf's father worked as a soldier at the Osu Danish garrison before he became a local agent for an English merchant, Joshua Ridley who eventually married the older Reindorf's sister, Anna. Reindorf's grandfather, Augustus Frederick Hackenburg was a Danish merchant who came to the Gold Coast in 1739 and later became the colonial Governor, leaving the position in 1748. As a little child, he lived in ritual servitude at a fetish shrine, Digbla of Gbugla of his mother's Ga-Dangme traditional religion. After fleeing the shrine, he received his early education at the Danish language school at the Christiansborg Castle from 1842 to 1847. His schoolmates were the Hesse sisters: Pauline Hesse, a trader and missionary-wife, married to the Jamaican Moravian educator, Alexander Worthy Clerk (1820-1906), in addition to Regina Hesse (1832-1898), a pioneer educator and school principal who married Hermann Ludwig Rottmann, the first Basel missionary-trader and founder of the Basel Mission Trading Company in Christiansborg, Gold Coast. He then continued his education at the Basel Mission School at Osu between 1847 and 1855. He was baptised in 1844. Unhappy with the school curriculum, he quit school halfway through his education and worked for his uncle as a trader for two years from 1850 to 1852. During this period, he often crossed the Volta River to trade with the Ewe people. One of his tutors in catechism was the German philologist, Johannes Zimmermann (1825-1876) who had a strong influence on him in the areas of source criticism and historiography.

=== Christian mission ===
Carl Reindorf was a mission assistant to the Basel missionary, August Steinhauser and ran administrative errands for him in Odumase-Krobo to meet the paramount chief, Odonkor Azu, whose sons, including Sir Emmanuel Mate Kole, were educated by the Basel Mission. Reindorf succeeded Steinhauser at Abokobi as a missionary, following the 1854 bombardment of Christiansborg by the British naval ship H. M. S. Scourge, after the poll tax riots, compelling the mission to move from Osu to Abokobi. The local Abokobi shaman, Akoto Badu of Agbowo, converted to Christianity while he was stationed there. He was transferred to Krobo in 1859 to deputise Johannes Zimmermann. He was also missionary at Teshie but was unable to win any Christian converts. Reindorf was consecrated a full-time catechist in 1857. In 1869, he was elected a presbyter and assistant superintendent of the Christiansborg Church, now the Ebenezer Presbyterian Church, Osu. On 13 October 1872 he was ordained a minister of the Basel mission.

=== Role as a physician and farmer ===
Given his knowledge of traditional healing through herbal medicine, gleaned from travels around the Gold Coast, Reindorf acted as the physician and surgeon to the wounded soldiers during an 1870 local war between the Ga and Akwamu peoples. Four years earlier, he had performed a similar medical role in 1866 local war between the Dangmes of Ada and the Awuna Ewe people. In appreciation of his medical services in treating the wounded after the Ga-Akwamu war, he was the recipient of a citation of commendation from the Administrator (1867–1872) and later Governor (1879 -1880), H. T. Ussher during the welcome ceremonies for a visiting contingent from Lagos, Nigeria.

He also engaged in large-scale coffee farming at a place he named "Hebron" near the hamlet of Adenkrebi close to Aburi.

=== Teaching and writing ===
Reindorf taught as an assistant teacher of history at the Basel Mission Seminary at Akropong from November 1860 to April 1862. Other courses at the seminary included English, Biblical exegesis, theology, geography and classical languages. He was the headmaster of the all boys' middle boarding school, the Salem School at Osu in 1873. As principal, he mentored several students such as Christian Holm, Peter M. Anteson and William A. Quartey, who all became teachers and catechists of the Basel mission. Carl Reindorf taught literacy in the Ga language and composed church hymns in Ga in 1856 and 1857. He established a boarding school at Mayera with a dozen Ga boys from Accra. He lived and worked in Mayera for a decade before returning to Christiansborg, Osu. In 1903, he was part of the committee at Abokobi that revised the Ga Bible, including Ludwig Richter, Jakob Wilhelm Werz, Christian Kölle and Daniel Sabah (1854-07). The revision committee completed its work in 1912.

He finished work on his notable book, A History of the Gold Coast and Asante in 1889. This literary piece was originally written in the Ga language. The English translation of the book was published in Basel in 1895. The inspiration or impetus for his magnum opus came from a strong sense of nationalism and the linguistic work that had been carried out on Twi oral traditions by the German philologist and fellow Basel missionary, Johann Gottlieb Christaller (1827–1895). Reindorf was also likely influenced by Christian Jacob Protten (1715–1769), a fellow Ga-Danish mulatto or Gold Coast Euro-African and an 18th-century Moravian missionary and educator in Christiansborg who wrote the first recorded grammatical pamphlet in the Ga and Fante languages, which was published in Copenhagen in 1764.

== Personal life ==
In 1856, Carl Reindorf married Juliana Ayikai Mansah Djebi from a notable household in Asere. Djebi had received a European-type education, living with Marie Locher, a missionary-wife in Christiansborg. The couple had eleven children including a prominent Gold Coast physician and a 1910 medical graduate of the Durham University, Dr. Charles Elias Reindorf, who died in 1968.

== Works ==
- Reindorf, Carl Christian (1895, 1966), The History of the Gold Coast and Asante, Basel

== Death and legacy ==
Carl Reindorf died of natural causes on 1 July 1917. The chiefs and people of Osu accorded him a "full state funeral" with "the attendance reported as being the largest seen in Accra for many years" At the church service, six Basel Mission pastors, including his fellow native Ga ministers, Jeremias Engmann (1840–20), W. A. Quartey who was later elected the third Moderator of the Presbyterian Church of the Gold Coast from 1925 to 1929 as well as Ludwig L. Richter and Samuel Wuta Ofei (1850–22) delivered eulogies. His remains were buried at the Basel Mission Cemetery in Accra and his epitaph reads, "native pastor and historian". A commemorative plaque in the sanctuary of the Ebenezer Presbyterian Church, Osu was dedicated in his memory. The church also renamed its chapel extension, the Carl Christian Reindorf Auditorium in recognition of his contributions to church, history and country. Reindorf's name also appears on a tablet in the chapel listing pioneering missionaries of Osu origin, in recognition of their contributions to formal education and the growth of the Presbyterian faith in Ghana.

The Carl Reindorf Park, a football park in Dansoman which is the home grounds of Ghanaian football club Liberty Professionals is named in his honour.
