= George Peter Thompson =

Liberian educator and minister

The Reverend George Peter Thompson
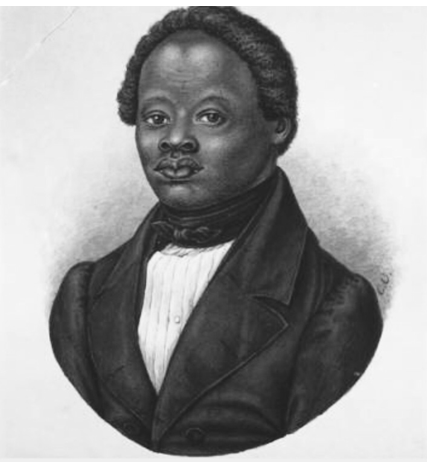
- George Peter Thompson in 1842
- Born: 1819; Cape Mount, Liberia
- Died: 1889 (aged 69–70)
- Education: Basel Mission Seminary, Basel, Switzerland
- Occupations: Clergyman; Educator; Missionary
- Spouse: Catherine Mulgrave (m. 1842; div. 1849)
- Children: 2

Ecclesiastical career
- Church: Basel Evangelical Missionary Society
- Offices held: 1st Headmaster, Salem School, Osu (1843–1846)

Orders
- Consecration: Basel Minster, 1842

George Peter Thompson (1819–1889) was a Liberian-born educator, clergyman and pioneer missionary of the Basel Evangelical Missionary Society of Switzerland. He was also the first African to be educated in Europe by the mission and subsequently, the first African to be consecrated and ordained a Basel missionary. Thompson was part of the Basel Mission team led by Danish missionary, Andreas Riis that recruited 24 West Indian missionaries from Jamaica and Antigua in 1843, to aid the work of the society. Together with the Jamaican educator-missionaries, Alexander Worthy Clerk and Catherine Mulgrave, George Thompson was a co-founder and the first principal of the all boys’ middle boarding school, the Salem School, Osu, established in November 1843.

== Early life and education ==
Born in 1819 in Cape Mount, Liberia, George Peter Thompson was orphaned as a child. Thompson spent his childhood in the household of Jehudi Ashmun, the Colonial Agent of Liberia at the time. He was then taken to Europe by the Basel missionary, the Rev. Jacob F. Sessing in 1829, when he was about ten years old. On the basis of his names, his parents were either of Americo-Liberian stock or Sierra Leonean Creole ancestry, descendants of freed slaves from the Americas. Sessing had gone to Cape Mount, Liberia in 1826 as a Basel missionary to set up a religious station or outpost but was unable to win any Christian converts as the natives viewed Christianity as a Western religion. In a conversation with Jove, the paramount chieftain of the Bassa ethnic peoples of coastal Liberia, Sessing recalled the king reiterating the widely held notion in nineteenth century colonial West Africa that the Bible was a book for Europeans while fetish or idolatry was central to African traditional beliefs. Eventually, the Basel mission abandoned its activities in Liberia. Thompson was raised in various European mission houses in Germany. He had his early education at a boarding school in Beuggen, Baden-Württemberg, from where the Pietist movement originated. From 1837 to 1842, he studied at the Basel Mission Seminary, a training school and seminary in Basel, Switzerland, where he was trained in theology, pedagogy, philosophy and languages. His consecration was in the summer of 1842 in the Basel Minster. As a result of his Pietist upbringing in Germany and Switzerland, Thompson was culturally European and fluent in English and German.

== Work ==
=== Missionary recruitment in the West Indies ===
Beginning in 1828, the first groups of missionaries who arrived from Switzerland and Germany under the aegis of the Basel Mission did not survive the tropical environment. In 1832, Danish missionary, Andreas Riis arrived on the Gold Coast, accompanied by Peter Petersen Jager, a Schleswig native, born in 1808 and Christian Friedrich Heinze, a medical doctor from Sachsen, born in 1804. By July 1832, both Jager and Heinze had died from tropical ailment. Riis himself was on the brink of death from fever. He was however cured by a native herbalist. For eight years, Riis remained on the Gold Coast but the missionary endeavour was unsuccessful.

Riis’ weak condition, the unfavourable climate and the European missionary death toll, exceeding eighty percent, forced the Home Committee of the Basel Mission Society to entirely abandon the mission enterprise and recall Riis in 1839, just as it had done earlier in Liberia. According to oral traditions, at a farewell durbar organised in honour of Riis, the king of Akuapem, Omanhene, Nana Addo Dankwa, is known to have stated, “How can you expect so much from us? You have been staying among us all along for a short time only. When God created the world, He made the Book (Bible) for the European and animism (fetish) for the African, but if you could show us some Africans who could read the Bible, then we would surely follow you.” The paramount chief's address gave Riis and the Basel Mission a philosophical message to ponder. The turning point for Christian evangelism in Africa happened when attempts were made to involve freed ex-slaves and their progeny from the Caribbean in the mission to Africa. A similar idea had been passed on by English missions in London to Basel but the final decision on West Indian recruitment was motivated by the chief's message to Riis.

Riis arrived at the Basel headquarters on 7 July 1840 and consulted with the Home Committee that had already decided to end the mission's West African evangelical effort. Riis asked the committee members to re-evaluate their decision by narrating Nana Addo Dankwa's valedictory speech to the Basel directors. They agreed to go to the West Indies to find qualified Afro-Caribbean Christian missionaries who could perhaps adapt quickly to the West African climate. Moreover, the Caribbean missionaries would prove to the Gold Coast locals that Christianity was indeed practised by all and sundry irrespective of ethnic heritage.

In 1842, the Home Committee selected the newly minted missionaries, Thompson, Johann Georg Widmann (1814 – 1876) and the assistant missionary, Hermann Halleur to go to the then British and Danish-controlled West Indies to recruit black Moravian Christians. On 28 May 1842, Andreas Riis and his wife, Anna Wolters, Widmann and Thompson left Basel for the British leeward island of Antigua in the West Indies via Gravesend and Liverpool for the recruitment exercise while Halleur was sent to the Gold Coast to prepare for the logistics for the arrival of the West Indians.

With the help of James Bruce, 8th Earl of Elgin, the Governor of Jamaica at the time, the Rev. Jacob Zorn, the Superintendent of the Moravian Mission in Jamaica, Thompson's benefactor, the Rev. J. F. Sessing and the Rev. J. Miller, a representative of the Africa Civilization Society, Riis was able to recruit candidates after a mass campaign across the island and a rigorous selection process. Many of the prospective candidates were considered unfit in character: quite a few were lapsed Christians while one wanted to go on an African expedition to mine gold. Another had a sickly wife who was too ill to travel whereas other potential recruits wished to the motherland as part of the “Back to Africa” movement, evangelism being of least priority to them. Riis and other Basel missionaries almost gave up on the initiative as finding the right fit of missionaries.

In metaphor of the Biblical Joseph story, a team of 24 Jamaicans and one Antiguan (6 distinct families and 3 bachelors) sailed from the Jamaican Port of Kingston on 8 February 1843 aboard the Irish brigantine, The Joseph Anderson, rented for £600, and per varying accounts, arrived in Christiansborg, Gold Coast on Easter Sunday, 16 April or Easter Monday, 17 April 1843 at about 8 p.m. local time, GMT after sixty-eight days and nights of voyage, enduring a five-day tropical storm on the Caribbean sea, shortage of fresh water and an oppressive heat aboard the vessel. A brief welcome event was organised by the Basel Mission at the Christiansborg Castle and the team was received by Edvard James Arnold Carstensen, the Danish Governor at the time, together with George Lutterodt, a personal friend of Andreas Riis who had earlier been Acting Governor of the Gold Coast. The surnames of the Caribbean missionaries were Clerk, Greene, Hall, Horsford, Miller, Mullings, Robinson, Rochester and Walker. Accompanying them was Thompson's new wife, Catherine Mulgrave, an Angolan-born, Jamaican trained mission schoolteacher who later ran a girls’ school in Christiansborg.

They also had with them donkeys, horses, mulls and other animals and agricultural seeds and cuttings such as mango seedlings which they were going to introduce to the Gold Coast food economy. The Caribbean recruits also brought new seedlings with them: cocoa, coffee, breadnut, breadfruit, guava, yam, cassava, plantains, cocoyam, banana and pear. Cocoyam, for example, is now a Ghanaian staple. Later on in 1858, the missionaries experimented with cocoa planting at Akropong, more than twenty years before Tetteh Quarshie brought cocoa seedlings to the Gold Coast from the island of Fernando Po (Bioko), then a Portuguese protectorate off the West coast of Africa.

Initially, Riis, as local head of the mission, had to be master of all trades: pastor, administrator, bursar, accountant, carpenter, architect and a public relations officer between the mission and the traditional rulers. As more Basel missionaries were recruited for the mission, the burden of administrator increased. Andreas Riis and another Basel missionary, Simon Süss were compelled to trade and barter in order to fund essential needs of the growing mission. The missionaries faced many challenges and one of the many charges leveled against them by detractors was that they had become merchants instead of church missionaries. The team started evangelising to the rural people around Akropong, so the Basel Mission. As such, the church became known as the “rural” or “bush” church. Riis wanted to evangelise inland and master Twi language spoken more widely in the hinterlands of the Gold Coast. By 1851, eight years after the arrival of the Caribbean missionaries, twenty-one Akropong natives had been baptised as Christians.

=== Contributions to education on the Gold Coast ===
On arrival in the Gold Coast colony, the whole team relocated to Akropong. Thompson and Riis argued fiercely with each other regularly. The Basel missionaries transferred Alexander Worthy Clerk, George Thompson, and his young bride, Catherine to Christiansborg to establish an English-language school on the coast, on behalf of the society. On 27 November 1843, a boys’ boarding middle school, the Salem School opened at Christiansborg, the oldest continuously operating school in the world established by the Basel Mission. The trio were the pioneer mission school masters. Salem's school curriculum was quite comprehensive: English and Ga languages, arithmetic, geography, history, religious knowledge, nature study, hygiene, handwriting and music. There was also artisanal training, including pottery, carpentry, basket and mat weaving and practical lessons in agriculture in the school garden. A strict disciplinary code, based on austere living was enforced. The first batch had 41 pupils: 34 boys and 7 girls and the first classes were held in rented premises. The school later moved to the mission house originally owned by the Danish governor which stood at the centre of the Osu coastal village and contained ground floor rooms for the school and management. On the upper floor, there were missionary apartments, girls’ school, founded by Mulgrave and teachers’ quarters. The introduction of English as the lingua franca in school gained wide acceptance after the Danes sold their fortresses on the eastern part of the Gold Coast including Osu, to the British in 1850.

In the nineteenth century, the name Salem described a Christian village modelled after the Pietist village in Wurttemberg, many Basel missionaries hailed from. European Basel missionaries settled with their converts in Salem. The Christian quarter of the town had the church, the school and other buildings. The school was built around a quadrangle with the classrooms on one side, dormitories on the other and the headmaster's and teachers’ residences on the other side. This arrangement kept teachers and pupils in constant touch with one another.

The school faced many challenges in its first decade. Within a year of its establishment, Alexander Worthy Clerk was sent to Akropong to start a similar school there. Thompson became the sole director of the school. In 1854, the British authorities, aided by the colonial forces, bombarded the town of Osu for two days using the warship, “H.M. Scourge” after the indigenes refused to pay the newly imposed poll-tax. Several parts of the town were destroyed. The young school together with a large number of new African converts moved to Abokobi. The school was transferred back to Osu to the place called Salem around 1857. Later, other Salem schools were established in Abetifi, Ada Foah, Kyebi, La, Nsaba, Odumase, Peki, Teshie. A vehicle for upward mobility, several of the school's alumni later became administrators, accountants, bankers, civil servants, dentists, diplomats, engineers, judges, lawyers, medical doctors, political leaders, professors, technocrats and teachers in the colonial era. From the 1850s to the 1950s, Salem alumni were active in public life and elite society, and formed the upper crust in the Gold Coast colonial social hierarchy.

== Personal life ==
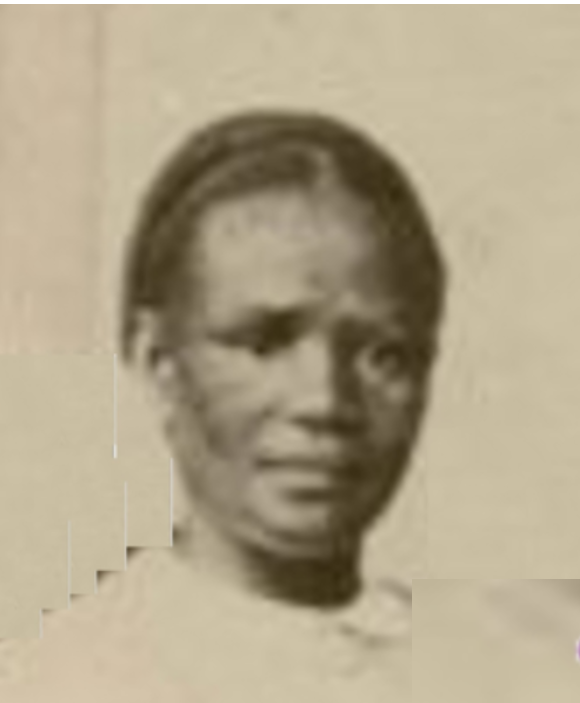
Catherine Mulgrave

In 1842, when the Basel Mission recruitment team visited Jamaica, George Peter Thompson fell in love with sixteen-year old Catherine Mulgrave. Upon the recommendation of the Moravian church and the tacit approval of the Basel mission, Mulgrave though initially undecided accepted Thompson's proposal. It is on record that her foster mother, Lady Mulgrave, opposed the union. They later married in Jamaica on 11 December 1842 before they sailed to the Gold Coast with the rest of the Basel missionaries and Caribbean recruits in February 1843. Catherine Mulgrave suffered a miscarriage on the journey to West Africa. Thompson and Mulgrave had their first child, a girl named Rosina in 1844. In 1846, they had a second child, a son baptised George.

The couple divorced in 1849 after a fallout from Thompson's infidelity. Thompson and Mulgrave officially separated on 10 July 1849, in the presence of a Danish colonial government official In divorce papers, it was stated that she first filed for divorce and the mission awarded her full custody of the children. She was also at liberty to remarry. In the event of her death, the mission would take care of her children. As a divorced woman with young children to feed, she found it difficult to live on her meagre teacher's salary as her ex-husband, Thompson had been expelled from the mission and had departed the Gold Coast. The Basel missionaries on the Gold Coast petitioned the Home Committee on her behalf, detailing her financial difficulties and requesting for debt forgiveness for unpaid loans from the mission, relating to essential needs for her children.

== Infractions and dismissal from the Basel Mission ==
In 1845, Andreas Riis, as a disciplinarian, suspended and placed on probation Thompson who had an alleged extra-marital affair with two women. In December 1846, it was disclosed through mutual watchfulness and reporting to superiors by a co-worker that Thompson was having multiple extra-marital affairs with the Ga-Dangme women at Christiansborg and allegedly with three girls at the school. One of girls was named Amba Brobin who had attended the girls’ school at Aburi for two years, had stayed with the Widmann missionary family for a year and was in the preparatory stages for baptism. Thompson had also become arrogant and a drunkard, developing a reputation as a womaniser between 1843 and 1849.

The scandal created a prolonged moral crisis for Catherine Mulgrave. Thompson was effectively put on probation as a missionary for approximately a year and a half and was stripped of his position as a schoolmaster at Salem and transferred to Akropong, to be given a second chance supervised closely by other Basel missionaries, Widmann, Roes, Dieterle, Mohr and their colleagues. One Basel missionary, Friedrich Schiedt defended George Thompson after the allegations of sexual transgressions surfaced. Meanwhile, Mulgrave stayed on the coast where she continued to run the school and raise their two children. Thompson had another affair which was discovered in June 1849. After much probing, Thompson admitted to these affairs which violated his Basel Mission contract. He wrote his statement in the mission house, witnessed the Basel missionary Johannes Stanger.

As the only ethnically African member of the Basel Mission, Thompson faced alienation from his European colleagues. His moral failures and perceived lack of contrition were blamed on his African identity. A missionary wife and educator, Rosina Widmann, née Binder, (1826-1908) saw him as "a bad person," insinuating that he was “the embodiment of a brutish man [...] dangerously unworthy to be part of the mission.” Binder's husband, Johann Widmann questioned his aptitude as a teacher. In an official report to Basel, Thompson was described as having “sunk deep morally...always suspect to us and one could not expect anything good from him because of his conduct.” Some of scholars have posited that, as a tragic character, Thompson was detached from his native African culture and Liberian origins due to the separation of time and place while growing up in Europe, leading to a loss of identity, making him out of sync with his Basel missionary colleagues. Some of his harshest critics like Andreas Riis claimed he did not know his “place and was always striving for something above himself.” He was thus perceived an outsider or “other” in mission circles. Thompson made a direct complaint to the Home Committee about being demeaned by his fellow missionaries and this was corroborated in a letter written by Hermann Halleur on 30 April 1844 to his brother. The Basel home board's response was even more critical: “With your thoughtlessness, you brought these humiliating experiences upon yourself,” a letter sneered.

On his banishment and subsequent departure from the Gold Coast, George Thompson stated that “the mission should remember him in prayers, since he was aware that he went wrong.”

== Later years and death ==
After his divorce, defrocking and expulsion from the Basel Mission, George Thompson returned to his homeland, Liberia. Later, he re-joined the Basel Mission in 1876, staying on until his death in 1889.
