= List of monarchs who were Freemasons =

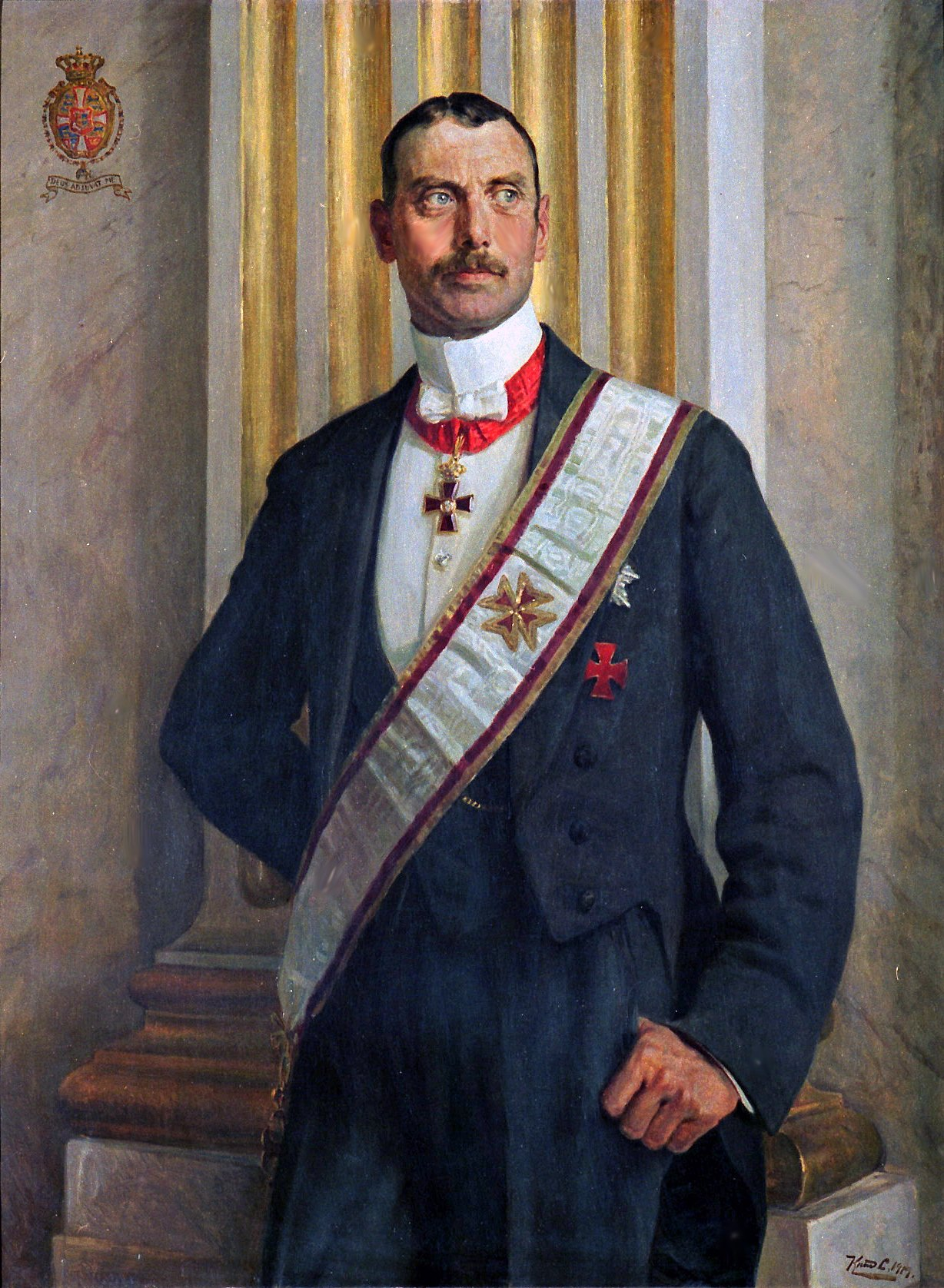
King Christian X of Denmark in Masonic regalia.

This is a list of monarchs who were Freemasons, and lists individual monarchs chronologically under the countries they ruled, monarchs who ruled more than one country are listed under the one they are most known for, or the dominant nation in a personal union (i.e. Christian X listed under Denmark and not Iceland). Those listed below were members of a Freemason Lodge sometime during their lives. Some, like Alexander I of Russia, would later outlaw Freemasonry in their territories, while others would continue supporting the organization for the rest of their lives.

== Andorra ==
- Jules Grévy
- Alexandre Millerand
- Gaston Doumergue
- Paul Doumer – Grand Secretary of the Grand Orient of France (1892)

== Anhalt-Köthen ==
- Friedrich-Ferdinand

== Afghanistan ==
- Habibullah Khan

== Baden ==
- Karl Friedrich – Grandmaster of the National Lodge of Baden

== Bavaria ==
- Maximilian I Joseph

== Belgium ==
- Leopold I

== Bikaner ==
- Ganga Singh

== Brandenburg-Ansbach ==
- Karl Wilhelm Friedrich
- Karl Alexander – Amicus eminens et protector ordinis in Franconia

== Brandenburg-Bayreuth ==
- Friedrich
- Friedrich Christian

== Brazil ==
- Pedro I

== Breslau ==
- Philipp Gotthard von Schaffgotsch
- Joseph Christian Franz zu Hohenlohe-Waldenburg-Bartenstein

== Brunswick ==
- Karl I
- Ferdinand (also Order of the Illuminati)

== Bulgaria ==
- Alexander I

== Carnatic ==
- Ghulam Husain Ali Khan

== Cooch Behar ==
- Nripendra Narayan

== Courland ==
- Karl Christian Joseph – Superior et Protector Ordinis in Saxonia

== Denmark ==
- Fredrik V
- Fredrik VI
- Christian IX
- Fredrik VII
- Christian VIII – Grandmaster of the Danish Order of Freemasons
- Fredrik VIII
- Christian X

== Egypt ==
- Tawfiq
- Abbas II
- Hussein Kamel

== Frankfurt ==
- Eugène de Beauharnais – Grand Master of the Grand Orient of Italy (1805-1814), Grand Commander of the Supreme Council of Italy

== Ghana ==
- Ofori Atta I (Okyenhene or King of Akyem Abuakwa) – (1912–1943)
- Azzu Mate Kole II (Konor of the Manya Krobo Traditional Area) – (1939–1990)
- Osei Tutu Agyeman Prempeh II (Asantehene) – (1931–1970)
- Oyeeman Wereko Ampem II (Gyaasehene of Akuapem and Amanokromhene) – (1975–2005)
- Osei Tutu Agyeman Prempeh II, Asantehene, 1931–1970
- Otumfuo Osei Tutu II (Asantehene) – (1999–present), Grand Patron, Grand Lodge of Ghana; Sword Bearer, United Grand Lodge of England; Grand Patron, Grand Lodge of Liberia

== Gwalior ==
- Jiwajirao Scindia

== Germany ==
- Wilhelm I
- Friedrich III – Master of the Order, Grand Landlodge of the Freemasons of Germany

== Hanover ==
- Ernst August – Grandmaster of the Grand Lodge of Hanover
- Georg V – Protector of Freemasonry in Hanover, Grandmaster of the Grand Lodge of Hanover

== Hawaii ==
- Kamehameha IV
- Kamehameha V
- Kalākaua

== Hesse-Darmstadt ==
- Ludwig VIII
- Ludwig X (also Order of the Illuminati)

== Holland ==
- Lodewijk I – Deputy Grand Master of the Grand Orient of France (1805)

== Holy Roman Empire ==
- Franz I

== Hyderabad ==
- Mir Osman Ali Khan

== Jaipur ==
- Bhawani Singh

== Jordan ==
- Hussein bin Talal

== Algeria ==
- Abd al-Qādir ibn Muḥyiddīn

== Mecklenburg-Schwerin ==
- Friedrich Ludwig

== Mecklenburg-Strelitz ==
- Adolph Friedrich IV
- Karl II – Patron of the united Lodges of the dominions of the Electorate of Brunswick, Duchy of Mecklenburg, Principalities of Münster-Waldeck and Hildesheim

== Mexico ==
- Maximilian I

== Moldavia ==
- Constantin Mavrocordat
- Mihai Draco Suțu
- Alexandru Ipsianti

== Montenegro ==
- Petar II Petrović-Njegoš

== Mysore ==
- Jayachamarajendra Wadiyar

== Naples ==
- Gioacchino I

== Netherlands ==
- Willem II

== Norway ==
- Haakon VII

== Ottoman Empire ==
- Murad V

== Pataudi ==
- Mansoor Ali Khan Pataudi

== Patiala ==
- Bhupinder Singh

== Perak ==
- Idris Shah II

== Poland ==
- Stanisław II August

== Portugal ==
- Pedro IV
- Fernando II

== Prussia ==
- Friedrich II
- Friedrich Wilhelm II
- Friedrich Wilhelm III

== Rampur ==
- Raza Ali Khan – Grandmaster of the Grand Lodge of India

== Reuss-Lobenstein ==
- Heinrich LXXII

== Sarawak ==
- James Brooke

== Saxe-Coburg-Gotha ==
- Ernst II

== Saxe-Gotha-Altenburg ==
- Johann Adolf
- Ernst II (also Order of the Illuminati)

== Saxen-Meiningen ==
- Karl Friedrich III
- Karl Wilhelm
- Georg I Friedrich Karl

== Saxe-Weimar-Eisenach ==
- Karl August (also Order of the Illuminati)

== Serbia ==
- Mihailo III
- Aleksander
- Petar I

== Sikh Empire ==
- Duleep Singh

== Spain ==
- José I – Grand Master of the Grand Orient of France (1805)
- Amadeo I

== Sweden ==
- Adolf Fredrik – Master of a Stockholm lodge
- Gustaf III – Vicar of Solomon
- Karl XIII – Grandmaster of the Swedish Order of Freemasons, and Army Master of the Order of Strict Observance
- Karl XIV Johan – Grandmaster of the Swedish Order of Freemasons, and of the Norwegian Order of Freemasons
- Oscar I – Grandmaster of the Swedish Order of Freemasons, and of the Norwegian Order of Freemasons
- Karl XV – Grandmaster of the Swedish Order of Freemasons, and of the Norwegian Order of Freemasons
- Oscar II – Grandmaster of the Swedish Order of Freemasons, and of the Norwegian Order of Freemasons
- Gustaf V – Grandmaster of the Swedish Order of Freemasons
- Gustaf VI Adolf – Grandmaster of the Swedish Order of Freemasons

== United Kingdom ==
- George IV – Grand Master of the Premier Grand Lodge of England (1790–1813)
- William IV
- Edward VII – Grand Master of the United Grand Lodge of England (1874–1901)
- Edward VIII
- George VI – Grand Master of the Grand Lodge of Scotland (1936–1937)

== Wallachia ==
- Scarlat Ghica
- Grigore II Ghica
- Alexandru Moruzi

== Westphalia ==
- Jérôme I – Grand Master of the Grand Orient of Westphalia

== Wurttemberg ==
- Friedrich II Eugen
- Friedrich I

== Yugoslavia ==
- Aleksandar I

== See also ==
- List of presidents of the United States who were Freemasons
- List of Freemasons
