= Rahman Osman =

Ghanaian sports journalist

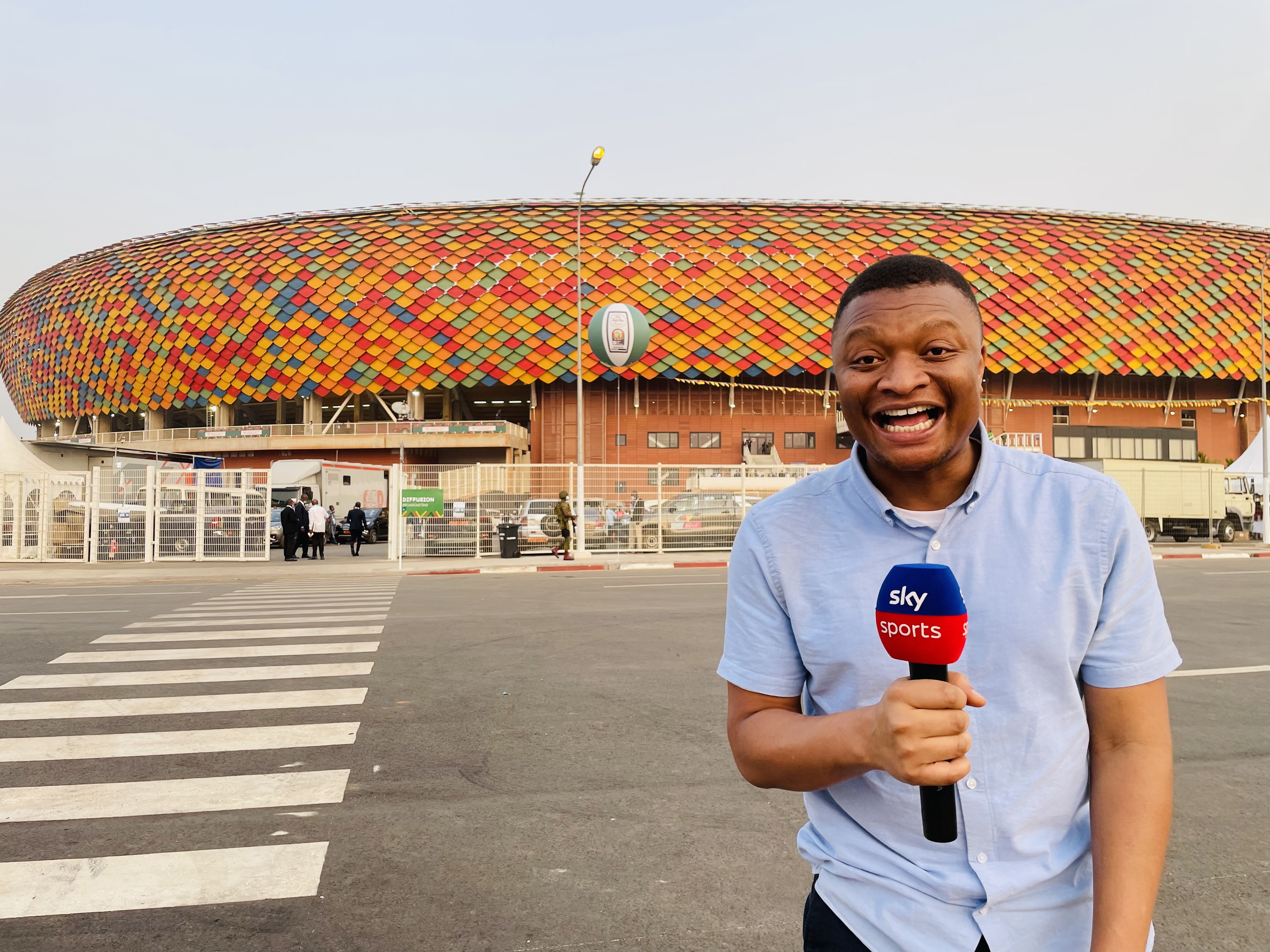
- Rahman Osman in Cameron for Afcon 2021 final in Yaounde.
- Education: Adisadel College; University of Ghana
- Occupation: Sports journalist

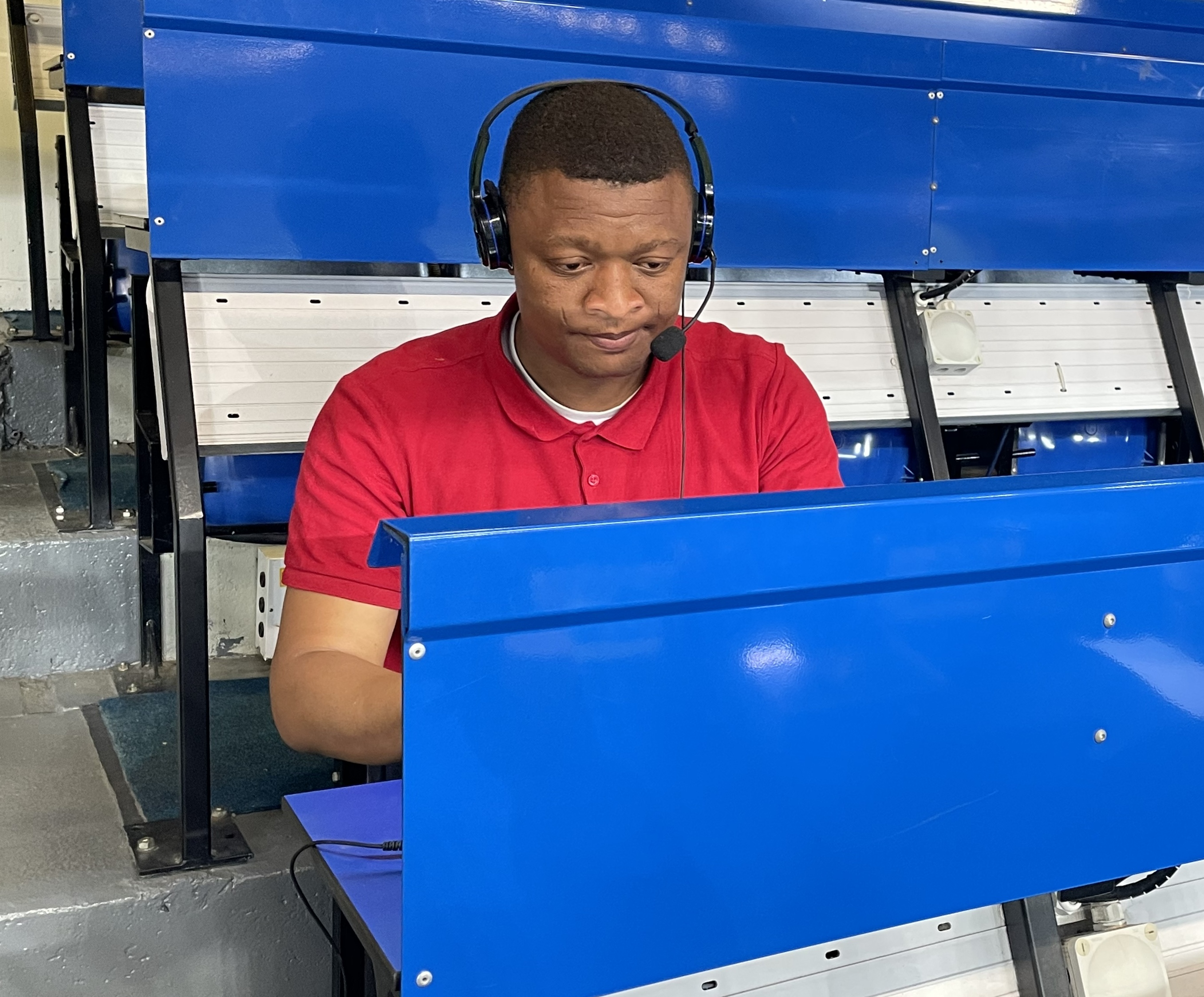

Rahman Osman is a Ghanaian sports journalist and broadcaster based in the United Kingdom.

== Early life and education ==
Osman was born and raised in Ghana. He attended Adisadel College and later studied at the University of Ghana. He later moved to the United Kingdom, where he earned a master's degree in International and Multimedia Journalism from the University of Westminster.

== Career ==
Osman began his career at Global Media Alliance, contributing to radio and television outlets such as ETV Ghana and Happy FM. He also wrote for GhanaSoccernet, covering both local and international football. He later joined Citi FM as a sports segment host and participated in a media visit to the BBC's London studios in 2016.

After relocating to the UK, he joined the Daily Mirror and subsequently joined NationalWorld, contributing to various titles such as The Scotsman, Sunderland Echo, and LondonWorld, where he served as a football writer. He currently writes for The Sun where his coverage includes Premier League clubs, the Africa Cup of Nations, and major international tournaments.

Osman has also co-hosted the “Made in Africa” podcast, which discusses African players in European football.

== Recognition ==
In 2015, he was nominated for the Ghana Sports Excellence Award for Best Online Reporter.

== See also ==
- Fentuo Tahiru Fentuo
- Saddick Adams
