= Sakite I =

Ghanaian paramount chief

Nene Sakite I

Konor of Manya Krobo Traditional Area
- Reign: 1867–1892
- Coronation: 1867
- Predecessor: Nene Odonkor Azu
- Successor: Emmanuel Mate Kole
- Born: Krobo Odumase
- Died: 1892; Manya Krobo District
- House: Odumase Dynasty
- Religion: Traditional African religions
- Occupation: Farmer; Paramount chief

Nene Sakite I (died in 1892 in Krobo Odumase) was the second Konor, or paramount chief, of the Manya Krobo and reigned 1867 until his death in 1892. He was succeeded by Emmanuel Mate Kole who ruled Manya Krobo from 1892 until his death in 1939.

He was born in Odumase Krobo in the Eastern Region of Ghana.
