= Johannes Zimmermann (missionary) =

German missionary, linguist and clergyman (1825–1876)

The Reverend Johannes Zimmermann
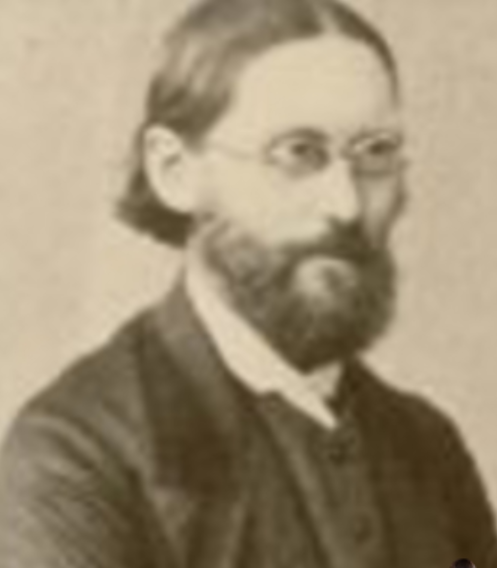
- Johannes Zimmermann
- Born: 2 March 1825; Gerlingen, Kingdom of Württemberg
- Died: 13 December 1876 (aged 51); Gerlingen, Kingdom of Württemberg
- Education: Basel Mission Seminary, Basel, Switzerland
- Occupations: Clergyman; Ethnolinguist; Missionary
- Spouse: Catherine Mulgrave (m. 1851)
- Children: 6

Ecclesiastical career
- Church: Basel Evangelical Missionary Society

Orders
- Ordination: 9 December 1849, Herrenberg
- Consecration: Basel Minster, 1849

Johannes Zimmermann (2 March 1825 – 13 December 1876) was a missionary, clergyman, translator, philologist and ethnolinguist of the Basel Evangelical Missionary Society of Switzerland, who translated the entire Bible into the Ga language of the Ga-Dangme people of southeastern Ghana and wrote a Ga dictionary and grammar book. Mostly an oral language before the mid-nineteenth century, the Ga language assumed a written form as a result of his literary work. Zimmerman's work built upon the single introductory grammatical treatise written by the Euro-African Moravian missionary and educator, Christian Jacob Protten, in the Ga and Fante languages, and published a century earlier in Copenhagen, in 1764.

== Early life and education ==
Johannes Zimmermann was born on 2 March 1825 on Kirchstraße 5 (5 Church Street) in the town of Gerlingen, Kingdom of Württemberg, now German state of Baden-Württemberg. Born into a family of farmers, he was the oldest of five children. Deeply religious, Zimmermann's pietistic family had compulsory "devotional hours" several times a week. His grandfather owned a restaurant, which became a meeting place for the pietistic communities from Gerlingen and surrounding villages. As a pupil, Johannes Zimmermann's views were shaped by the apocalyptic zeal of a troubled religious period. While still a boy, the pietistic fervour motivated him to become a missionary in Africa after leaving school. After school, he joined a trade apprenticeship in carpentry and also started occupational training to become a baker. After he finished his apprenticeship, he went on foot to Basel, Switzerland with the aim of training as a missionary. On 17 August 1844, Johannes Zimmermann arrived in Basel to begin his six-year missionary training at the Basel Mission Seminary (Basler Missionseminar). At the seminary, he began studying the Gã language because he was drawn to a call to become missionary on the Gold Coast. On 9 December 1849, Johannes Zimmermann was ordained by the missionary superintendent, the Rev. Kapf in Herrenberg, a town in the middle of Baden-Württemberg, about 30 km south of Stuttgart in Germany. A week later he bade farewell to his hometown Gerlingen and set off to a new journey as a missionary on the Gold Coast. According to the German church historian, Paul Steiner, in his Zimmermann biography, "When Zimmermann stepped then into the pulpit of the old venerable church, then this whole house of God was filled with sitting and standing people. While he did his farewell speech, he was often interrupted by the sobbing of the parish, and when he spoke to the persons of his age and former mates, then even the tough, rough farm youth cried like children."

== Missionary activities on the Gold Coast ==
=== Osu and Abokobi ===
Upon his arrival on the Gold Coast in 1850, Johannes Zimmermann, then twenty-five years old, was first stationed in Christiansborg, now the suburb of Osu in Accra, where he taught at the all boys' middle boarding school, Salem School, Osu In 1852, he started and taught at the small catechist seminary, the Basel Mission Seminary in Christiansborg, Osu which was eventually absorbed into its counterpart at Akropong, the Presbyterian College of Education. His first impression of Accra was the presence of the former slave forts, the Christiansborg Castle and Ussher Fort – a stark reminder of a distant dark past. The sight of these landmarks influences Zimmermann's theology leading him to speak against slavery and exploitation for the rest of his life.

A few months after his arrival, Zimmermann fell ill with a tropical ailment, then dubbed, “Africa fever”. His options were imminent death or an immediate return home". Choosing a more unorthodox alternative for a European missionary at the time, he sought treatment at the shrine of a native healer or shaman. He regained his health quickly and became fully acclimatized to the domestic environment.

After the 1854 bombardment of Christiansborg by the H. M. S. Scourge, following the riots against the British poll tax ordinance, Zimmermann was forced to move with his family, his students, and some members of the Christian community to the more interior Abokobi, about 15 miles (24 kilometres) from Accra, where, with the assistance of another missionary, August Steinhauser, he set up a small Christian community—a step from the European characterized lifestyle to the original African life. Before the evacuation, Zimmermann and his family had sought refuge at the Methodist mission house in Accra. At Abokobi, Zimmermann did intensive language studies and translations. In 1857, under the guidance of Zimmermann, a local fetish priest at Abokobi, Paulo Mohenu converted to Christianity which was considered a great achievement at the time. He also had dreams of building a German community as a way to solve the social problems of Germany by emigration to Africa to farm on the vast swathes of virgin or fallow lands at Abokobi. Between 1858 and 1859, Johannes Zimmerman was transferred back to Christiansborg to replace another missionary who had died in the preceding year.

=== Kroboland ===
In 1855, Zimmerman and the Rev. C. W. Locher traveled as far as Odumase in the state of Krobo, 50 miles (80 km) northeast of the Ghanaian capital, Accra, where they were warmly welcomed by the paramount chief, Odonkor Azu, who entrusted one of his sons, Tei, to them to be educated and brought up as a Christian. In 1859, he was transferred to Odumase-Krobo to open a new mission station there and where he lays the foundation for his work on the Gold Coast. As he had visited the place before, he did not face many challenges. He was accompanied by two of his former pupils, Carl Christian Reindorf, and Christian Obuobi, and worked in the Krobo area until 1872. His plans included setting up a Euro-African settlement to “maximize utilization of mineral resources, progressive agriculture, increasing export of goods, to improve people's living conditions.” He noted that in spite of demographic and linguistic differences, rural German and the traditional Gold Coast cultures were analogous with regards to communal lifestyles, farming and craftsmanship, adding that "Africa needs Germans. We are a continental people who traditionally earn a living by farming and the old crafts"

Johannes Zimmermann built his mission house in the village of Odumase, the hub of the Kingdom Manya-Krobo where he saw himself as an "ambassador of Jesus". The tribal chieftain, King Odonkor Azu, is open-minded and supportive of the Christian mission. As a sign of his friendship with Zimmermann, the Krobo paramount chief instructed his subjects to carve a stool from a special piece of wood. The chief's son, Tei, moved in with the Zimmermann family. The king anointed Johannes Zimmermann, “Teitsɛ” meaning the "father of the king's son Tei".

At the end of 1869, ten years after Zimmermann's arrival in Odumase, the Christian parish had grown to about a hundred members. The mission house was open to everyone living in Manya-Krobo and neighbouring villages. Overall, Johannes Zimmermann worked for 12 years in the kingdom of Manya-Krobo. Missionary Bohner recounted in his diary after a visit to Rebmann in Odumase, Kroboland: "He has put up his house ... into the middle of the [natives'] village ... The house is like a [native's] hut, covered with steppe grass. But the white coating from muschelkalk, the dark-brown shutters from solid wood of the African oak, the light glass windows and the galleries around the building tell someone who lives here."

== Contributions to Ga-Dangme literature ==
Zimmermann's greatest contribution to the Gold Coast was in the field of Ga-Dangme literature. In his work in education at Christiansborg, both in the catechist seminary as well as in the boys' school, he emphasised the teaching of the vernacular, Ga language. From the very beginning, Zimmermann started collecting Ga words and terms, later to be published in his dictionary. Within the Christian ministry and catechism, he translated the Bible and 500 hymns (300 of which were his own compositions) into the Gã language, and also penned several poems. According to scholars, he was “deeply influenced by the sociohistorical theories of Johann Gottfried Herder (1744–1803), whose views on the life cycle of communities and on the equality of different cultures was opposed to the historical conception of the Enlightenment, which considered Western civilization as superior to other cultures and as the ideal and goal toward which other cultures did or should aspire”

=== Selected works ===
The following publications are some of Zimmermann's literary works:

- Zimmermann, J. (1855). “The Four Gospels in the Ga Language.” London
- Zimmermann, J. (1858). “An English-Accra or Ga Dictionary.” Stuttgart
- Zimmermann, J. (1858). “The Acts of the Apostles (Ga translation).” London
- Zimmermann, J. (1859). “The Epistle of St. Paul the Apostle to the Romans (Ga translation).” London
- Zimmermann, J. (1860). “The New Testament (Ga translation),” 2nd edition, London, 1872, new revised edition 1889, corrected reprint 1908, corrected reprint 1911. London
- Christaller, J. G., Locher, C. W., Zimmermann, J. (1874) “A Dictionary, English, Tshi (Asante), Akra; Tshi (Chwee) Comprising as Dialects: Akan and Fante; Accra connected with Adangme; Gold Coast, West Africa,” Basel
- Zimmermann, J. (1885). “A Grammatical Sketch of the Akra or Ga Language and Some Specimens of it from the Mount of the Natives,” Stuttgart, 1858, revised edition published as "A Grammatical Sketch of the Akra or Ga Language and a Vocabulary of the Same with an Appendix on the Adanme Dialect," 2 Vols. Stuttgart
- Zimmermann, J., Christaller, J. G. and Locher, C. W. (1894). “English-Tschi-Akra Dictionary” Basel
- Zimmermann, J. (1907). “The Old Testament (Ga translation),” rev. ed. London

== Personal life ==
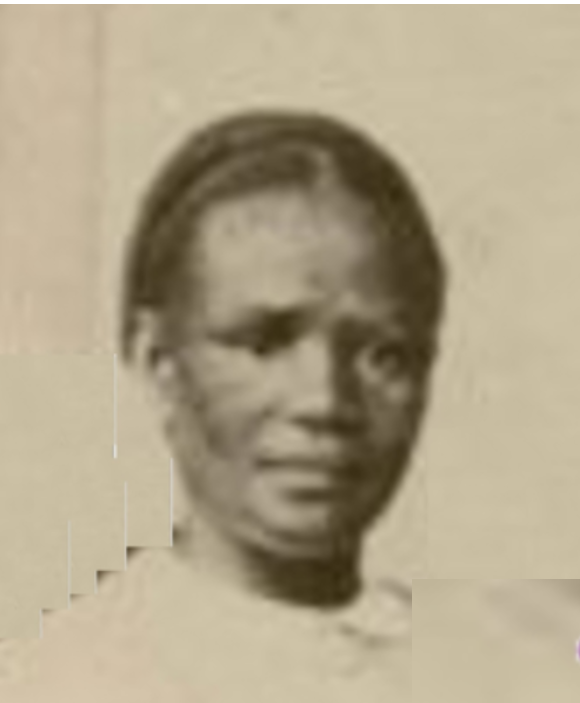
Catherine Mulgrave

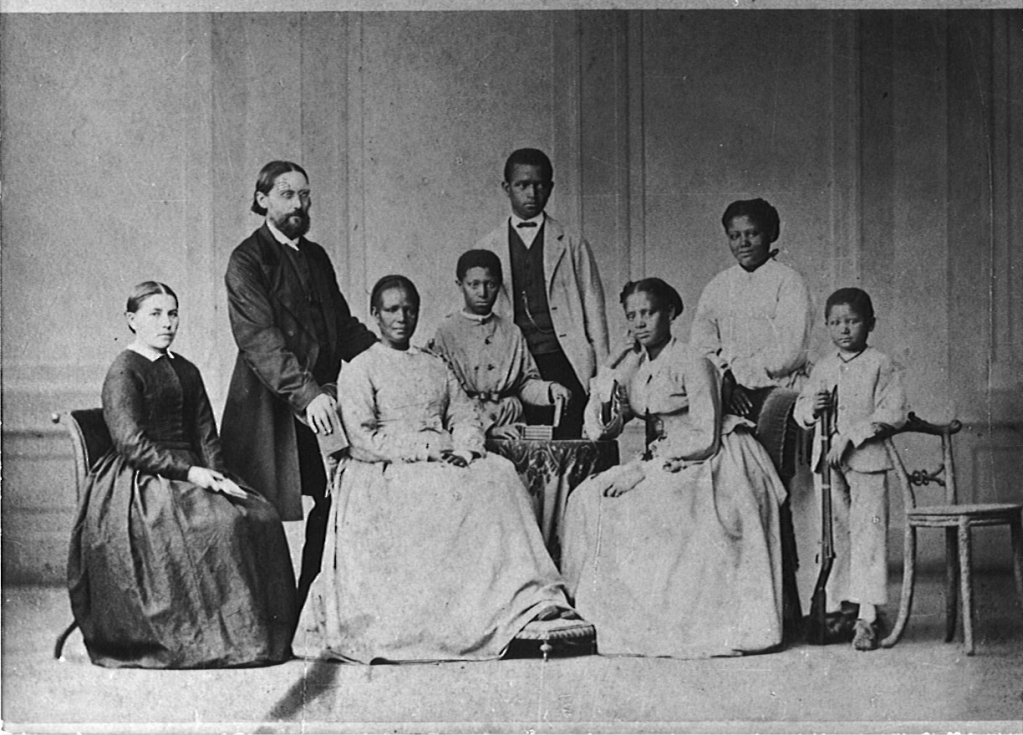
Zimmermann (1st row, standing, first from left), Catherine Mulgrave (2nd row, sitting, second from left), with children, 1873

In June 1851, Johannes Zimmermann married Catherine Mulgrave, an Afro-Jamaican divorced woman who was teaching in the girls' school at Christiansborg. The Basel Mission Society was shocked by this marriage because Zimmermann had not asked for permission from the Home Committee. Facing possible dismissal from the Basel Mission for marrying a divorced African woman, Zimmermann remarked in defiance, "I am marrying Africa...well, the African liana has climbed the German oak tree." As punishment, the Home Committee, suspended Zimmermann, stripping him of his rights to travel home to Europe every year on furlough, effectively making him a local missionary on the Gold Coast for the next twenty-two years. Mulgrave was born in Angola but raised in Jamaica after being rescued as a six-year old from Portuguese slave traders who had kidnapped her. They brought her onto a slave ship from Africa to Jamaica. Near the coast of Jamaica, the ship got in distress and sank. Catherine Mulgrave was however rescued from the wreckage. She recalled her mother calling her by the Angolan name “Gewe” as a child and was adopted by the then Governor of Jamaica, Earl of Mulgrave and his wife, Lady Mulgrave who educated her at the Female Refuge School followed by teacher training at the Mico Institution in Kingston, Jamaica. Mulgrave had earlier been married to the Americo-Liberian, George Peter Thompson who had been educated in Basel Mission training school in Basel, Switzerland as a mission assistant. In 1843, the young couple emigrated to the Gold Coast with a group of Jamaican missionaries from Kingston. Thompson and Mulgrave however got divorced six years later. Zimmermann and Mulgrave made the Gold Coast their home. Five of their six children lived to adulthood: two daughters and three sons. His dream of creating a German-African settlement in Abokobi never materialised although his descendants still live in Ghana. Furthermore, his own children and youngest brother, Christoph also married African spouses, indicating that his family was acclimated to the indigenous environment.

== Later life and death ==
Failing health and exhaustion made him leave for Europe to recuperate for a year. On his return, he lived and worked at Abokobi until 1876, when he returned to Christiansborg. Shortly after this, he fell ill again, and returned to his hometown, Gerlingen with his wife, Catherine via Basel in September 1876, where he died at the end of the same year, on 13 of December 1876 at the age of fifty-one. Catherine, his wife, returned to the Gold Coast in the spring of 1877 and lived at Christiansborg until her death, fourteen years later, in 1891. For the last months of his life, he stayed in Gerlingen. It was his ultimate wish to be brought into the house of his fathers. His last words were: "Water of life! Oh, how much I want to drink." He was buried in a graveyard in Gerlingen

== Legacy and memorials ==
Zimmerman's legacy is tied to his mission work in Kroboland where he is held in high esteem. He forged links with the locals and was seen as a "bridge between people and cultures", built on strong foundations. Johannes Zimmermann's areas of operations, the Manya-Krobo and Yilo-Krobo Traditional Areas are located in southeastern Ghana covering 750 square kilometres with a population of approximately 250, 000 inhabitants. What started with Zimmermann has been continued with cultural exchange over the years: There is an alliance between Kroboland and Gerlingen with delegations. The Zimmermann Presbyterian Cemetery in Accra was named in his memory.

In 1970, the then Synod Clerk of the Presbyterian Church of Ghana, the Rev. Albert L. Kwansa visited Gerlingen to search for information about background, youth and surrounding of the missionary Johannes Zimmermann, who in nowadays Ghana very much honoured in the oral tradition of Kroboland's history. In 1972, the Mayor of Gerlingen, Wilhelm Eberhard travelled with an official delegation to Zimmermann's sphere of activity in Ghana. Later on in his retirement, Mayor Eberhard stated, "It is unbelievable how people in Ghana talk nowadays still full of respect and gratitude to Johannes Zimmermann and his beneficial life's work. Whoever we met - not only the members of the hosting church, also political personalities - pay tribute to the good deeds which Zimmermann did from 1850 to 1876 and which are still in use to see. Seen from the angle that he had to deal with the conceivable most difficult conditions, it's all the more admirable." In 1976, the king from Manya Krobo, Nene Azzu Mate Kole II came to Gerlingen. He is one of the well-known tribal chieftains of Ghana. Together with inhabitants of Gerlingen he unveiled the commemorative plaque for Zimmermann in front of Petruskirche (St. Peter's Church) and presented the "Zimmermann chair" as a gift to the town of Gerlingen. In 1989, Nene Azzu Mate Kole II invited the then Mayor of Gerlingen, Sellner together with a delegation to his golden jubilee celebration of enstoolment and ascension to the throne in Ghana.

There is a street in Gerlingen named in his honour, the Johannes Zimmermann Straße. The Johannes Zimmermann Memorial Presbyterian Churches were erected in his memory at both Abokobi and Odumase, Krobo. There is a well in Odumase (Ghana) that Johannes Zimmermann had built and is still in use. A commemorative plaque at the church in Gerlingen, St. Peter's Evangelical Church (Evangelische Petrusgemeinde Gerlingen) was erected in 1976 for Johannes Zimmermann. The reference library of the Akrofi-Christaller Institute in Akropong, Ghana was named the "Johannes Zimmermann Library" in his honour. A graveyard, Zimmermann Presbyterian Cemetery, was named in his memory
