= Azzu Mate Kole II =

Ghanaian police officer, paramount chief and statesman (1910–1990)

Nene Azzu Mate Kole II
- Oklemekuku, KMC, OBE, OV

Konor of Manya Krobo Traditional Area
- Reign: 1939–1990
- Coronation: 22 June 1939
- Predecessor: Nene Sir Emmanuel Mate Kole
- Successor: Nene Sakite II
- Born: Frederick Lawer Mate Kole; January 1910; Krobo Odumase
- Died: 15 March 1990 (aged 80); Manya Krobo District
- House: Odumase Dynasty
- Father: Nene Sir Emmanuel Mate Kole
- Religion: Presbyterian
- Occupation: Police officer; Paramount chief

Oklemekuku, Nene Azzu Mate Kole II, KMC, OBE, OV, known in private life as Frederick Lawer Mate Kole (January 1910 – 15 March 1990) was a Ghanaian paramount chief and statesman who served as the fourth monarch or king, Konor of the Manya Krobo Traditional Area in southeastern Ghana and reigned from 1939 to 1990.

== Early life and education ==
Mate Kole was born in January 1910 to Nene Sir Emmanuel Mate Kole who ruled the Manya Krobo Traditional Area between 1892 and 1939. He attended Basel Mission/Presbyterian primary and middle schools. He then went to Achimota College near Accra for his secondary education. From there, he went to the United Kingdom and enrolled in the Police College, passing out at a record rank of Corporal in 1936, three years before his enthronement as chief. After his education, he enlisted in the Gold Coast Police Force and quickly rose through the ranks to attain the position of Assistant Superintendent of Police (ASP).

== Chieftaincy and socioeconomic initiatives ==
Mate Kole was enstooled Konor of Manya Krobo on 22 June 1939 at the age of twenty-nine to succeed his late father, who had just died. Mate Kole was then a police officer stationed at Mampong Akwapim. As chief, Mate Kole played a leading role in the socioeconomic development of the Manya Krobo Traditional Area. As chieftain, he was instrumental in the establishment of Manya Krobo Secondary School (MAKROSEC) as replacement of the Presbyterian Boys’ Secondary School (PRESEC) which had been relocated in 1968 from Odumase-Krobo to its current Legon campus at Accra. As a member of the Government's Central Advisory Committee on Education, he operationalized its recommendations which led to the establishment of fifteen Akro State Schools in several villages in Kroboland. He was aided by R. P Djabanor. The Akro State Schools later became the Asesewa Senior High School in the Upper Manya Krobo District and the Akro Senior High School in Odumase Lower Manya Krobo Municipality. The other schools in the Akro State system were absorbed into the public system as government-assisted institutions.

As a progressive chief, Mate Kole also championed girl-child education in 1950s and 1960s when there were huge disparities in female enrollment in schools due to cultural factors. He also established a state scholarship scheme for students from the Manya Krobo district.

As an advocate of formal education and communal self-help, he organised the administrative state machinery and established the stool treasury which became the revenue collection system for Manya Krobo. Within three years, it was recorded revenues had increased threefold. With increased revenue, the traditional state set up and ran its own transport services. More than twenty-five wells were dug at multiple locations in the town. This foresight helped town avert a crisis during an acute water shortage in 1947.

Manya Krobo became a notable agricultural centre during Mate Kole's reign. He spearheaded the construction of bridges and feeder roads to link surrounding farming, production and principal market centres such as Abuachau, Akateng, Akotue, Asesewa, Ehiamekyene, Osonson, Sekesua, Sisiamang, Sutapong. His efforts led to an appreciable increase in revenue from market tolls, farm size, tonnage of food crops assembled at the market centres. He enlisted the Army Field Engineers of the Gold Coast to construct bridges across the Akrum River at Abuachau and Mlegedu. The project, which cost £9,500, was paid from the Manya Krobo state treasury.

In conjunction with the Office of the District Commissioner at Akuse, James Moxon, Mate Kole organised an Agricultural Show at Laasi, Odumase-Krobo in 1947. The expo was the biggest provincial show in that period and was attended by the Governor of the Gold Coast, Sir Alan Burns together with merchants, manufacturers, indigenous and foreign farmers.

In 1976, Nene Azzu Mate Kole II visited Gerlingen in Germany, the hometown of Johannes Zimmermann (1825–1876), a philologist, linguist and Basel Missionary who translated the Bible into the Ga language and published a grammar book. Zimmerman had lived in Odumase Krobo during his sojourn in colonial Ghana in the mid-nineteenth century.

== Role in national development ==
Mate Kole was appointed a member of the government's Central Advisory Committee on Education (1946–1951) and released stool lands for the establishment of the Mount Mary Training College and the University of Ghana's Agricultural Research Station at Kpong.

From 1947 to 1954, he served on the Legislative Council which later evolved into the National Assembly under the provisions in the Electoral College which gave representation to the Provincial Council of Chiefs. In 1948, he was part of the Gold Coast delegation to Lancaster House in London which made a case to the British government for self-government.

Other national committees he served on include: Blackhall Committee on Native Courts; the West African Institute of Science and Industry (1942–1945); University College of Ghana Council (1958–1960); the Wartime Economic Committee of the Gold Coast and management board member of the West African Cocoa Research Institute. He was the president of the Eastern Provincial Council of Chiefs (1947); deputy chairman of the Chieftaincy Secretariat (1966); and chairman of the National Advisory Committee (1968). He had three stints as the chairman of the board of governors of his alma mater, Achimota School.

Additionally, he was a key member in all the constitution drafting and approving bodies between 1949 and 1973. He was a member of the Coussey Committee on Constitutional Reforms. In 1969, he was the deputy speaker of the Blay Constituent Assembly, which discussed and drafted the National Constitution of the Second Republic. In this role, he lobbied for the establishment of the National House of Chiefs as the mouthpiece for traditional rulers in Ghana.

He was involved with the ideation, planning and execution of the Volta River Project which led to the building of the Akosombo Dam. Mate Kole was the first paramount chief appointed to first Board of Trustees of the Volta River Authority under the chairmanship of Ghana's first president, Kwame Nkrumah, serving on the board for ten years. Years earlier in 1954, he played a role in the building of the Kpong Water Works that provided water treatment plants for the residents of Manya Krobo.

Mate Kole was instrumental in the establishment of the Ghana Cocoa Board. Specifically, he chaired the Joint Provincial Council of Chiefs Committee that looked at problems facing the Gold Coast cocoa industry, culminating in the publication of Mate Kole Report, the passage of the Cocoa Marketing Board Ordinance in 1947 and finally the establishment of the current Cocoa Marketing Board.

== Personal life ==
Nene Azzu Mate Kole II was a member of the District Grand Lodge of Ghana under the United Grand Lodge of England.

== Honours and awards ==
In recognition of his contributions to the development of his hometown, Manya Krobo and the country, Mate Kole was accorded with several honours, including the King's Medal for Chiefs (KMC) in 1942; Officer of the Order of the British Empire (OBE) in 1948; the Order of the Volta (OV) in 1969; Doctor of Law (LLD honoris causa), University of Ghana in 1975. In 1989, during the golden jubilee anniversary of his enthronement, the Manya Krobo state honoured him with highest traditional title of the land, "Oklemekuku", meaning "a great leader and an ancient fellow", in appreciation of his contributions to the socioeconomic development of Manya Krobo in areas relating to education, agriculture, water and sanitation, road works and transport.

== Death and legacy ==
Nene Azzu Mate Kole II died on 15 March 1990 of natural causes, not long after the golden jubilee celebrations of his enthronement as chieftain of Manya Krobo (1939–1989). In accordance with his native traditions, his funeral ceremony was held in 1992, which was attended by several Ghanaian dignitaries. On the silver jubilee of his death, a lecture on girl-child education was held in his memory at the Odumase Presbyterian Church at Odumase-Krobo. The lecture, chaired by the reigning monarch, Nene Sakite II, Konor of Manya Krobo was on the topic, "Oklemekuku Azzu Mate Kole: A great king and a statesman".
