= Sakite II =

Ghanaian paramount chief

Nene Sakite II

Konor of Manya Krobo Traditional Area
- Coronation: 1999
- Predecessor: Nene Azzu Mate Kole II
- Born: Krobo Odumase
- House: Odumase Dynasty
- Religion: Presbyterian
- Occupation: Paramount chief

Nene Sakite II (born in Krobo Odumase) is the fifth and reigning Konor, or paramount chief, of the Manya Krobo, enstooled in 1999. His predecessor was Azzu Mate Kole II, who ruled Manya Krobo from 1939 until his death in 1990. There was an interregnum in Manya Krobo between 1990 and 1999 due to chieftaincy succession disputes.

In 2015, on the silver jubilee of the death of Azzu Mate Kole II, the son of Nene Sir Emmanuel Mate Kole, a memorial lecture on female education was held in his memory at the Odumase Presbyterian Church at Odumase-Krobo, which was chaired Nene Sakite II on the topic, “Oklemekuku Azzu Mate Kole: A great king and a statesman”.
