= Odumase =

Odumase may refer to:

== Places in Ghana ==
- Odumase, Ghana, or Odumase Sunyani West, in Bono Region
- Krobo Odumase, Lower Manya Krobo Municipal District, in Eastern Region
- Konongo, Ghana, or Konongo-Odumase, in Ashanti Region

== Other uses ==
- Odumase dynasty
