= Okperpiem =

Village in Eastern region of Ghana

- Country: Ghana
- Region: Eastern Region

Okperpiem is a suburb of Somanya in the Yilo Krobo municipality in the Eastern region of Ghana.
