= Mount Mary College of Education =

- Other name: Mt. Mary College of Education
- Established: 1947
- Affiliations: Government of Ghana
- Religious affiliation: Roman Catholic
- Academic affiliations: University of Ghana, Legon
- Chairperson: Most Rev. Dr. John Kobina Louis
- Principal: Prof. Kennedy Alatinga
- Location: Somanya, Yilo Krobo District, EY0030, Ghana; 6.11552°N 0.01543°W
- Language: English / French
- Region Zone: Eastern; Eastern / Greater Accra
- Short name: MomaCo
- Source: An Atlas of The Forty Colleges of Education in Ghana.

Mount Mary College of Education is a teacher education college in Somanya (Yilo Krobo District, Eastern Region Ghana). The college is located in Eastern / Greater Accra zone. It is one of the 46 public Colleges of Education in Ghana. The college participated in the DFID-funded T-TEL programme.

As of May 2019, the college is affiliated to the University of Ghana. The major programmes offered in the College are: JHS Education: French, English, Ghanaian Languages, Social Studies,Geography, RME, History, Music, PE, etc.; Primary Education, Special Education, etc.

== History ==
Mount. Mary College of Education is situated north-east of Somanya, on a hill overlooking the Somanya and Odumase townships. The institution was founded by American Catholic SVD Missionaries at Agormanya in 1947. Mount Mary College was opened with 23 male students to pursue two-year Post Middle Teacher's Certificate ‘B’ course. The college was moved to its present location in December, 1951. The motto of the college is VIRTUS ET SCIENTIA (Character and Knowledge). Mt. Mary College has had the occasion to offer several courses at different levels of attainment in line with government policy on teacher education in addition to the initial Certificate ‘B’ course.

Certificate ‘A’ Post ‘B’ was started in January 1953. In January 1954, the college added a third variety of students – Teachers’ External Certificate holders, who were admitted to do a two year course for the award of the Teacher's Certificate ‘A’ Post ‘B’ External. In 1963, Teacher's Certificate ‘A’ 4-year was started. These two courses remained till 1974 when the status of the college changed to 2-year Post Secondary College. A year later, the first batch of French students was admitted for a 3-year Post Secondary course.

The course in French received support from the French government in the areas of equipment, personnel, teaching and learning materials. Students go for proficiency course in neighbouring Francophone countries. In addition to French, Agricultural Science, Basic Science, Mathematics, Ghanaian Languages, Music, Religious and Physical Education are offered by the students. The college remained a male institution until September, 1974 when it became co-educational with the admission of 20 female students.

List of Principals since the College's inception
Name	Years served
Rev. Fr. Edward Datig SVD	1947 – 1954
Rev. Fr. Alphonse Elsbernd, SVD	1955 – 1958
Rev. Fr. Dr. C. G. Roesslein, SVD	1958 – 1970
Mr. Henry K. Owusu	1970 – 1973
Mr. Daniel Dumfeh	1973 – 1975
Mr. Francis A Sackitey	1975 – 1980
Mr. Vincent P. K. Ametefe	1980 – 1998
Mr. J. P. Otoo	1998 – 2005
Jacob M. A. Kor	2006 – Date
