= Odonkor Azu =

Ghanaian paramount chief

Nene Odonkor Azu

Konor of Manya Krobo Traditional Area
- Reign: 1835–1867
- Coronation: 1835
- Predecessor: New Position
- Successor: Sakite I
- Born: Krobo Odumase
- Died: 1867; Manya Krobo District
- House: Odumase Dynasty
- Religion: Traditional African religions
- Occupation: Farmer; Paramount chief

Nene Odonkor Azu (died in 1867 in Krobo Odumase) was the first Konor, or paramount chief, of the Manya Krobo and reigned 1835 until his death in 1867. He was succeeded by Sakite I, who ruled Manya Krobo from 1867 until his death in 1890. In 1855, two Basel Missionaries, Johannes Zimmerman and C. W. Locher travelled to Odumase in the state of Krobo, 50 miles (80 km) northeast of the Ghanaian capital, Accra, where they were warmly welcomed by Odonkor Azu, who entrusted one of his sons, Tei, to them to be baptised educated and brought up as a Christian.
