= Ahabarsu =

Community in Eastern Region, Ghana

- Country: Ghana
- Region: Eastern Region
- District: Upper Manya Krobo District

Ahabarsu is a community in the Upper Manya Krobo District in the Eastern Region of Ghana.
