= List of rulers of the Adangbe state of Manya Krobo =

== List of rulers of the Manya Krobo State ==
Tenure	Incumbent	Notes
c.1500	Foundation of Manya Krobo state
Konor (rulers)
Odumase Dynasty
1835 to 1867	Odonkor Azu, Konor
1867 to 1892	Sakite I, Konor
1892 to 1939	Emmanuel Mate Kole I Konor
1939 to 1990	Azu Mate Kole II, Konor
1990 to 1999	Interregnum
1999 to present	Sakite II, Konor

== See also ==
- Dangme
- Ghana
- Gold Coast
- Lists of office-holders
