= Ngmayem =

Festival in Ghana by the Krobos

The Ngmayem Festival is an annual harvest festival celebrated by the chiefs and people of Manya Krobo in the Eastern Region of Ghana. The festival was introduced and established during the reign of Nene Azu Mate Kole, the then Konor (paramount chief) of Manya Krobo in 1944. It replaced the already existing festival called Yeliyem festival, literally means "eating of yam" which focused on the consumption of newly harvested yam. Ngmayen is mainly associated with Manya Krobo, especiallyOdumase Krobo and Somanya and celebrated in the month of October Odumase. The festival is celebrated for one week, mostly from the last two Sundays of the month of October. The establishment of the Ngmayem festival reflected the importance of millet cultivation among the Krobo people and created a festival centred on thanksgiving and communal identity.

== The Celebration ==
The Ngmayen festival includes traditional ceremonies involving chiefs, elders and the members of the Manya Krobo community. Activities commonly associated with the celebration include thanksgiving ceremonies, traditional performances, drumming, dancing and a durbar (gathering) of chiefs and community members. The festival also provides an occasion for community leaders to address social and developmental issues affecting the Krobo people.

== Cultural Significance ==
Beyond the agricultural origins, Ngmayen serves as a cultural institution for the Manya Krobo people. The festival strengthens communal bonds, preserves traditional practices and provide an opportunity for the celebration of krobo heritage. It also brings together Krobo communities living outside the traditional area.

== Etymology ==
The name Ngmayen is derived from the Dangme word 'Ngma' meaning millet, and 'yesm' meaning eating. The name refers to the consumption of newly harvested millet during the festival and reflects the agricultural importance of millet among the Manya Krobo people.

== Modern Observance ==
In contemporary time, Ngmayem Festival has continued to serve as a gathering point for the Manya Krobo community. In addition to traditional ceremonies, the festival provides an opportunity for discussions on community development and cultural preservation.
