= Konor =

Ghanaian paramount chieftaincy

Konor is the title of the monarch or ruler of the Manya Krobo Traditional Area in the Eastern Region of Ghana. The current reigning house is the Odumase Dynasty.
