= Thomas Partey =

Ghanaian footballer (born 1993)

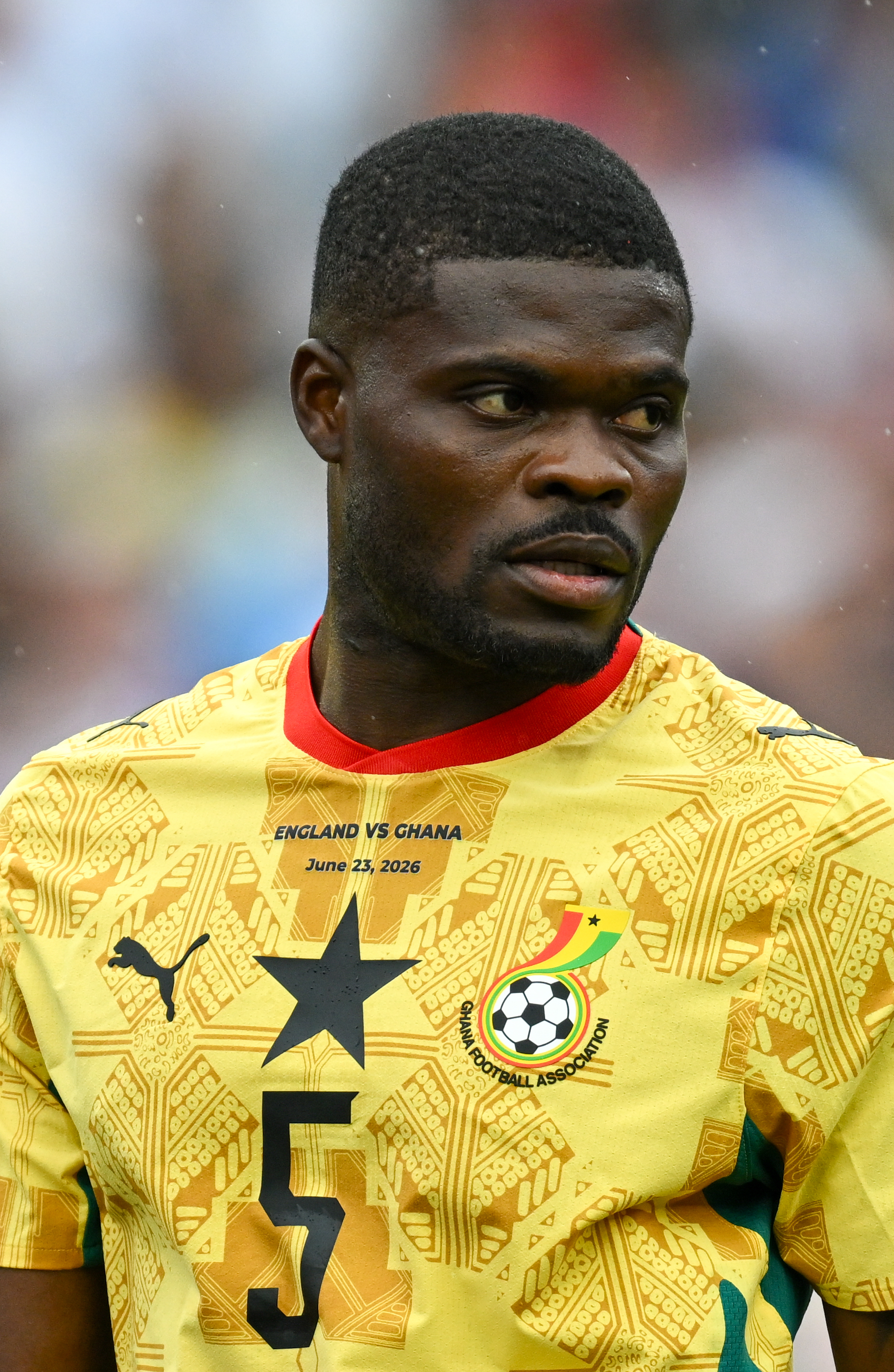
- Partey with Ghana in 2026

Personal information
- Full name: Thomas Teye Partey
- Date of birth: 13 June 1993 (age 33)
- Place of birth: Krobo Odumase, Ghana
- Height: 1.85 m (6 ft 1 in)
- Position: Defensive midfielder

Team information
- Current team: Al-Shabab
- Number: 18

Youth career
- 2011–2012: Odometah
- 2012: Leganés
- 2012–2013: Atlético Madrid

Senior career*
Years	Team	Apps	(Gls)
2013–2020	Atlético Madrid	132	(12)
2013–2014	→ Mallorca (loan)	37	(5)
2014–2015	→ Almería (loan)	31	(4)
2020–2025	Arsenal	130	(9)
2025–2026	Villarreal	25	(0)
2026–	Al-Shabab	2	(0)

International career^{‡}
2016–	Ghana	61	(16)
- * Club domestic league appearances and goals as of 22:26, 25 August 2026 (UTC) ‡ National team caps and goals as of 11:20, 4 July 2026 (UTC)

Thomas Teye Partey (born 13 June 1993) is a Ghanaian professional footballer who plays as a defensive midfielder for Saudi Pro League club Al-Shabab and the Ghana national team.

Partey began his professional career at Spanish club Atlético Madrid in 2013, going on loan to Mallorca and Almería, and returned to Atlético in 2015, with whom he won the UEFA Europa League and UEFA Super Cup in 2018, as well as appearing in the 2016 UEFA Champions League final. In 2020, he joined Arsenal in a transfer worth £45 million (€50 million), becoming the most expensive Ghanaian player of all time. He played 167 games over five seasons at Arsenal, winning the Community Shield in 2023.

A Ghanaian international, Partey represented his nation at three Africa Cup of Nations (2017, 2019, and 2021) and two FIFA World Cup (2022 and 2026). He was named into the CAF Team of the Year in 2018, and won Ghana Player of the Year in 2018 and 2019.

In July 2025, Partey was charged by the Crown Prosecution Service with five counts of rape and one count of sexual assault, relating to alleged incidents involving three women in London between 2021 and 2022, and in February 2026 was further charged with two additional counts of rape, relating to alleged incidents involving a fourth woman in London in 2020.

== Club career ==
=== Atlético Madrid ===
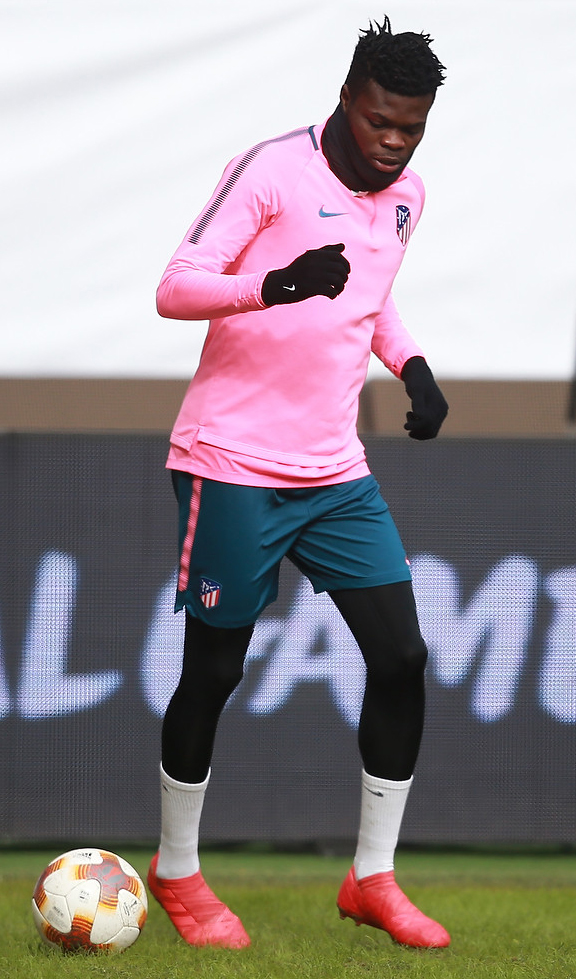
Partey with Atlético Madrid in 2018.

Born in Krobo Odumase, Partey was a product of local club Odometah's youth ranks. He signed with Atlético Madrid in 2012, after a short spell with Leganés, and was subsequently moved to the reserves a year later. On 10 March 2013, Partey was called up to the main squad for the match against Real Sociedad. However, he remained unused in the eventual 0–1 home defeat.

==== Mallorca and Almería ====
On 12 July, Partey was loaned to Mallorca, freshly relegated to the second level. On 18 August, he made his professional debut, in a 0–4 away defeat against Sabadell. Partey scored his first professional goal on 15 September, netting his side's second of a 2–2 draw at Hércules.

On 27 July 2014, Partey joined La Liga side Almería on a loan. He made his debut in the competition on 23 August, starting in a 1–1 home draw against Espanyol. Partey scored his first goals in the main category of Spanish football on 11 April 2015, netting a brace in a 3–0 home win against Granada.

==== Return to Atlético Madrid ====
Partey made his first team debut for Atlético Madrid on 28 November 2015, replacing Luciano Vietto in a 1–0 home win against Espanyol. On 2 January of the following year, he scored his first league goal for the club, netting the game's only strike in a home success over Levante. On 28 May, he played in the UEFA Champions League Final against Real Madrid, replacing Koke in the 116th minute as his side lost on penalties.

Partey signed a contract extension with Atlético Madrid through 2022 on 14 February 2017. On 31 October, he scored his first European goal with a long-range strike to equalise at home to Qarabağ in a 1–1 draw in the Champions League group game; he became the first African to score in the competition for Atlético. On 1 March 2018, Partey signed a new contract with Atlético Madrid, extending his deal until 2023. On 16 May, he played in the 2018 UEFA Europa League Final, as his side won 3–0 against Marseille.

On 1 September 2019, Partey came on as a late substitute and netted the match's winner in the last minute of the game, as Atlético came back from 2–0 down to win the game by 3–2 against Eibar. He marked his 100th La Liga appearance for Los Rojiblancos with a man-of-the-match performance in a 0–0 draw against Real Madrid in the Madrid derby four weeks later. Despite leaving Atlético at the beginning of the 2020–21 season, Partey made enough appearances at the start of the season to become eligible for a winner's medal as Atlético won La Liga that year.

=== Arsenal ===
On 5 October 2020, Premier League club Arsenal announced the signing of Partey on a long-term contract, after activating his £45 million (€50 million) release clause with Atlético Madrid. He was given the number 18 shirt, which had been vacated by Nacho Monreal the previous season. Upon signing, Partey stated his desire to help Arsenal "back where [they] belong", describing his decision to move being based on "[wanting] to experience new challenges", while also crediting the transfer to manager Mikel Arteta and technical director Edu.

On 17 October 2020, Partey made his debut for Arsenal as a substitute for Granit Xhaka in a 1–0 away defeat in the league against Manchester City. Five days later, he started his first match for Arsenal in a 2–1 away win over Rapid Wien in the UEFA Europa League. Midway through a match against Aston Villa on 8 November, he suffered a thigh injury which saw him miss the rest of the month's games. He returned on 6 December in the North London derby, but suffered another injury at half-time as Arsenal lost 2–0 to Tottenham Hotspur. He did not play again until a month later, which he came off the bench in a 0–0 draw against Crystal Palace. On 22 October 2021, Partey scored his first goal for Arsenal in a 3–1 win against Aston Villa. In February 2022, Partey was named Arsenal's player of the month.

In the 2022–23 season, he scored three goals in 33 appearances, including his club's Goal of the Season in a 3–1 victory over Tottenham Hotspur. On 6 August 2023, he won his only honour for Arsenal, the FA Community Shield on penalties against Manchester City; he played the entire game and was booked after eight minutes for kicking the ball away after fouling Julián Alvarez. In November 2023, he sustained a hamstring injury which kept him sidelined for most of the 2023–24 season.

On 24 August 2024, Partey returned to Arsenal's starting line-up in their second game of the 2024–25 season and scored in a 2–0 victory over Aston Villa. The goal was the player's first goal for the club since March 2023. He scored an outside-the-box shot against Nottingham Forest on 23 November 2024. In a post-game interview against Sporting C.P., Arteta praised his performances in the past weeks, stating, "This year, he’s been so consistent...that’s a big thing, he’s a massive player for us". On 2 February 2025, Partey scored a deflected shot off John Stones against Manchester City in a 5–1 rout at the Emirates. His contract expired at the end of the season and negotiations for a new deal were not agreed.

=== Villarreal ===
On 7 August 2025, La Liga club Villarreal announced the signing of Partey on a free transfer. The club stated that it was aware of the criminal charges against Partey and that it respected the presumption of innocence. He made his debut eight days later as the season began with a 3–0 home win over Real Oviedo, as a substitute for the last eight minutes; according to journalist Sid Lowe, there was no opposition to Partey's involvement in the game.

Partey made an appearance as a 78th-minute substitute against Arsenal's rivals Tottenham Hotspur in the 2025–26 UEFA Champions League league phase, where his introduction to the match was met with loud boos from home fans at the Tottenham Hotspur Stadium. Villarreal lost the match 1–0.

On 17 June 2026, Villarreal announced it would not intend to renew Partey's contract for a further season, and becoming a free agent since the end of June.

=== Al-Shabab ===
On 21 August 2026, Partey signed with Saudi Pro League club Al-Shabab on a free transfer.

== International career ==
In May 2016, Partey was called up for the first time to the Ghana national team by manager Avram Grant, ahead of a 2017 Africa Cup of Nations qualification match against Mauritius. He made his debut on 5 June, replacing Frank Acheampong for the final 11 minutes of a 2–0 away win that booked the Black Stars' position in the finals. On 5 September 2017, Partey scored his first international hat-trick in a 5–1 win against Congo in 2018 FIFA World Cup qualification.

Partey was chosen in Kwesi Appiah's 23-man squad for the 2019 Africa Cup of Nations in Egypt. In their last group game, he scored in a 2–0 win over Guinea-Bissau at the Suez Stadium as the Black Stars topped their group. He netted in the penalty shootout at the end of the last-16 game against Tunisia on 8 July, though his team was eliminated.

Partey won Ghana Player of the Year in 2018 and 2019. Ahead of the 2021 Africa Cup of Nations qualifiers, as well as for the 2022 FIFA World Cup qualifiers, Partey was named Ghana's vice-captain.

In November 2022, Partey was called up to the 26-man Ghana squad that would compete in Qatar for the 2022 FIFA World Cup.

In May 2026, Partey was included in Ghana's squad for the 2026 FIFA World Cup, as vice-captain. On 12 June, it was announced Partey had been denied entry to Canada, and would be unable to feature in Ghana's opening World Cup match against Panama in Toronto as a result. On 16 June, Partey's appeal against his denial of entry to Canada was dismissed by The Canadian Federal Court,the court documents revealed his application to enter Canada contained the answer "no" to the question of whether or not he had "ever been charged for any criminal offence in any country". He was given a visa by the United States for Ghana's two other games, with officials saying that they were aware of his upcoming trial, but he had not been convicted of any crime. On 21 June, Partey returned to Ghana's squad for their FIFA World Cup group-stage match against England at the Gillette Stadium.

== Media ==
Partey was involved in the Amazon Original sports docuseries All or Nothing: Arsenal, which documented the club by spending time with the coaching staff and players behind the scenes both on and off the field throughout their 2021–22 season.

== Personal life ==
Partey converted to Islam in March 2022. He said that his decision was influenced by his relationship with his Moroccan girlfriend, Sara Bella. In June 2022, it was reported that he had changed his first name to Yakubu as part of his religious conversion, while remaining Thomas Partey both legally and professionally; he said days later that he had changed his name back to Thomas.

In June 2022, Partey was made a chief of the Manya Krobo people of the Eastern Region of Ghana by the paramount chief, Nene Sakite II, following Ghana's qualification for the 2022 FIFA World Cup.

=== Legal issues ===
In July 2025, Partey was charged with five counts of rape and one count of sexual assault, relating to alleged incidents involving three women between 2021 and 2022. He appeared at Westminster Magistrates' Court on 5 August 2025. Partey was the previously unnamed footballer who news reports had said had been arrested on suspicion of rape in July 2022. He was not named at this point due to legal reasons and continued to play for Arsenal while under investigation. However, he was named as the footballer under investigation on social media, was subject to jeers related to the investigation while playing, and MPs and women's groups called for his suspension from the club.

The Metropolitan Police submitted an evidence file on Partey to the Crown Prosecution Service to assess possible criminal charges in January 2025. Arsenal's handling of the case while Partey was under investigation was criticized by some commentators, politicians, and advocacy groups. In this period, they had continued to play him regularly despite being aware of the allegations and investigation. Furthermore, one of Partey's alleged victims contacted the club and said they did not show enough sympathy to her. Arsenal have stated that "The player's contract ended on June 30. Due to ongoing legal proceedings, the club is unable to comment on the case." With head coach Mikel Arteta stating he was "100 per cent" sure the club had followed all the correct processes around the arrest and investigation.

Partey appeared at Southwark Crown Court on 17 September 2025, where he entered a plea of not guilty to the charges of rape. He was granted bail on the same conditions as before his appearance. A trial date of 2 November 2026 was set for the case to be heard at Southwark Crown Court. On 12 February 2026, Partey was charged with an additional two counts of rape against a new complainant. On 13 April 2026, Partey pleaded not guilty to the two counts at Southwark Crown Court. The judge ordered all seven counts to be heard together, and the trial date was likely to be pushed back to January 2027.

On 8 April 2026, Partey was put under investigation by a judge in Andorra for allegations of illegal watch smuggling.

== Career statistics ==
=== Club ===
As of match played 25 August 2026

Appearances and goals by club, season and competition
Club	Season	League			National cup (Note: Includes Copa del Rey, FA Cup)		League cup (Note: Includes EFL Cup)		Continental		Other		Total	
Club	Season	Division	Apps	Goals	Apps	Goals	Apps	Goals	Apps	Goals	Apps	Goals	Apps	Goals
Mallorca (loan)	2013–14	Segunda División	37	5	1	0	—		—		—		38	5
Almería (loan)	2014–15	La Liga	31	4	1	0	—		—		—		32	4
Atlético Madrid	2015–16	La Liga	13	2	5	1	—		5 (Note: Appearance(s) in UEFA Champions League)	0	—		23	3
Atlético Madrid	2016–17	La Liga	16	1	2	0	—		6	0	—		24	1
Atlético Madrid	2017–18	La Liga	33	3	3	1	—		14 (Note: Six appearances and one goal in UEFA Champions League, eight appearances in UEFA Europa League)	1	—		50	5
Atlético Madrid	2018–19	La Liga	32	3	3	0	—		6	0	1 (Note: Appearance in UEFA Super Cup)	0	42	3
Atlético Madrid	2019–20	La Liga	35	3	1	0	—		8	1	2 (Note: Appearances in Supercopa de España)	0	46	4
Atlético Madrid	2020–21	La Liga	3	0	—		—		—		—		3	0
Atlético Madrid	Total		132	12	14	2	—		39	2	3	0	188	16
Arsenal	2020–21	Premier League	24	0	1	0	0	0	8 (Note: Appearances in UEFA Europa League)	0	—		33	0
Arsenal	2021–22	Premier League	24	2	0	0	2	0	—		—		26	2
Arsenal	2022–23	Premier League	33	3	1	0	0	0	6	0	—		40	3
Arsenal	2023–24	Premier League	14	0	0	0	0	0	1	0	1 (Note: Appearance in FA Community Shield)	0	16	0
Arsenal	2024–25	Premier League	35	4	1	0	4	0	12	0	—		52	4
Arsenal	Total		130	9	3	0	6	0	27	0	1	0	167	9
Villarreal	2025–26	La Liga	25	0	2	0	—		5	0	—		32	0
Al-Shabab	2026–27	Saudi Pro League	2	0	0	0	—		—		—		2	0
Career total			357	30	21	2	6	0	71	2	4	0	459	34

=== International ===
As of match played 3 July 2026

Appearances and goals by national team and year
National team	Year	Apps	Goals
Ghana	2016	5	0
Ghana	2017	10	5
Ghana	2018	4	2
Ghana	2019	9	3
Ghana	2020	2	0
Ghana	2021	4	2
Ghana	2022	9	1
Ghana	2023	4	0
Ghana	2024	4	0
Ghana	2025	5	3
Ghana	2026	5	0
Total		61	16

As of match played 8 October 2025.
Ghana score listed first, score column indicates score after each Partey goal.

List of international goals scored by Thomas Partey
No.	Date	Venue	Opponent	Score	Result	Competition
1	1 September 2017	Baba Yara Stadium, Kumasi, Ghana	Congo	1–1	1–1	2018 FIFA World Cup qualification
2	5 September 2017	Stade Municipal de Kintélé, Brazzaville, Congo	Congo	2–0	5–1	2018 FIFA World Cup qualification
3	5 September 2017	Stade Municipal de Kintélé, Brazzaville, Congo	Congo	3–1	5–1	2018 FIFA World Cup qualification
4	5 September 2017	Stade Municipal de Kintélé, Brazzaville, Congo	Congo	4–1	5–1	2018 FIFA World Cup qualification
5	10 October 2017	King Abdullah Sports City, Jeddah, Saudi Arabia	Saudi Arabia	3–0	3–0	Friendly
6	30 May 2018	International Stadium, Yokohama, Japan	Japan	2–0	2–0	Friendly
7	7 June 2018	Laugardalsvöllur, Reykjavík, Iceland	Iceland	2–2	2–2	Friendly
8	26 March 2019	Accra Sports Stadium, Accra, Ghana	Mauritania	3–1	3–1	Friendly
9	2 July 2019	Suez Stadium, Suez, Egypt	Guinea-Bissau	2–0	2–0	2019 Africa Cup of Nations
10	14 November 2019	Cape Coast Sports Stadium, Cape Coast, Ghana	South Africa	1–0	2–0	2021 Africa Cup of Nations qualification
11	9 October 2021	Cape Coast Sports Stadium, Cape Coast, Ghana	Zimbabwe	2–1	3–1	2022 FIFA World Cup qualification
12	12 October 2021	National Sports Stadium, Harare, Zimbabwe	Zimbabwe	1–0	1–0	2022 FIFA World Cup qualification
13	29 March 2022	Moshood Abiola National Stadium, Abuja, Nigeria	Nigeria	1–0	1–1	2022 FIFA World Cup qualification
14	24 March 2025	Grand Stade d'Al Hoceima, Al Hoceima, Morocco	Madagascar	1–0	3–0	2026 FIFA World Cup qualification
15	24 March 2025	Grand Stade d'Al Hoceima, Al Hoceima, Morocco	Madagascar	2–0	3–0	2026 FIFA World Cup qualification
16	8 October 2025	Ben M'Hamed El Abdi Stadium, El Jadida, Morocco	Central African Republic	2–0	5–0	2026 FIFA World Cup qualification

== Honours ==
Atlético Madrid

- La Liga: 2020–21
- UEFA Europa League: 2017–18
- UEFA Super Cup: 2018
- UEFA Champions League runner-up: 2015–16

Arsenal

- FA Community Shield: 2023

Individual

- CAF Team of the Year: 2018, 2023
- SWAG Sports Personality of the Year: 2018
- Ghana Player of the Year: 2017, 2018
- Ghana Football Awards Foreign-based Player of the Year: 2017–18, 2018–19
- Ghana Football Awards Footballer of the Year: 2017–18, 2018–19, 2024–25
