= Saddick Adams =

Ghanaian sports journalist

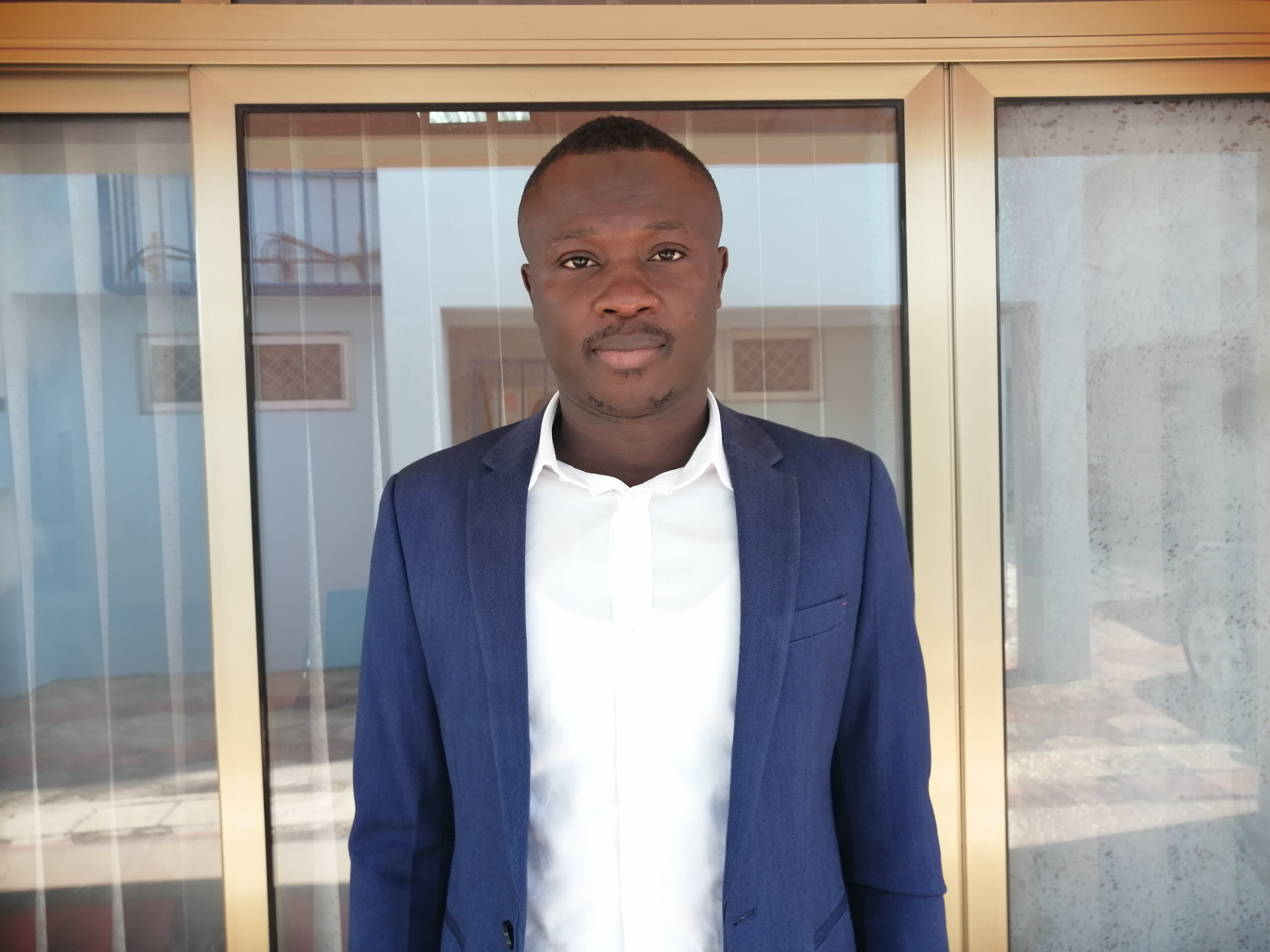
- Born: Saddick Baba Adams
- Other names: Sports Obama
- Education: Asanteman Senior High School; Sunyani Technical University
- Occupation: Sports journalist
- Awards: GJA award for sports Journalism, 2018

Saddick Adams, also known as Sports Obama, is a Ghanaian sports journalist and winner of the GJA awards in 2018 for his work in sports journalism.

== Education ==
He started his basic education at Adrobaa Roman Catholic school around Duayaw Nkwanta in the Ahafo Region. He moved to Kumasi at age nine to continue his basic education from St. Peters Basic, Bantama M/A school and finally completed his basic education at Islamic Educational Complex in Kumasi. He then attended Asanteman Senior High School and had his tertiary education at Sunyani Technical University. When he was in campus, he would go to the stadium when there is a game at hand and would report what happened on the field to his colleagues.

== Career ==
He started his early career in sport journalism as an intern at Radio Parrot which was a campus base radio station at Sunyani Technical University. He was in 2018 upgraded to the Head of Sports at Atinka FM. He was appointed manager of Angel TV in Accra where he doubles as a presenter. He has also written for several sports platforms including Ghana Sports Newspaper, Ghanasportsonline.com and the BBC, SuperSport, BeIN Sport and China Global Television Network (CGTN) covering the West Africa sports sub-region.

His pseudonym was given to him by his audience in Sunyani who saw the changes he was bringing into the field of sports journalism as at the time when Barack Obama was campaigning for change earned him the name Sports Obama.

He is a specialist when it comes to football in Africa.

== Awards ==
He won the 2018 Ghana Journalists Association (GJA) sports journalist Awards of the year.
