= Lower Manya Krobo Municipal District =

- Municipal District
- Districts of Eastern Region

- Location of Lower Manya Krobo Municipal District within Eastern
- Coordinates: 6°8′56.4″N 0°0′43.2″W
- Country: Ghana
- Region: Eastern
- Capital: Odumase

Government
  - Municipal Chief Executive: Simon Kweku Tetteh

Population (2021)
  - Total: 121,478
- Time zone: UTC+0 (GMT)

Lower Manya Krobo Municipal District is one of the thirty-three districts in Eastern Region, Ghana. Originally, it was formerly part of the then-larger Manya Krobo District in 1988, which was created from the former Kaoga District Council, until the northwest part of the district was split off to create Upper Manya Krobo District on 29 February 2008; thus the remaining part has been renamed as Lower Manya Krobo District. It was later elevated to municipal district assembly status on 6 February 2012 to become Lower Manya Krobo Municipal District. The municipality is located in the eastern part of Eastern Region and has Odumase (Odumase Krobo) as its capital town.

== Sources ==
- "Lower Manya Krobo Municipal District". Statoids.
- Districts: Lower Manya Krobo Municipal District
