= Sparqlyn =

Ghanaian hiplife artist

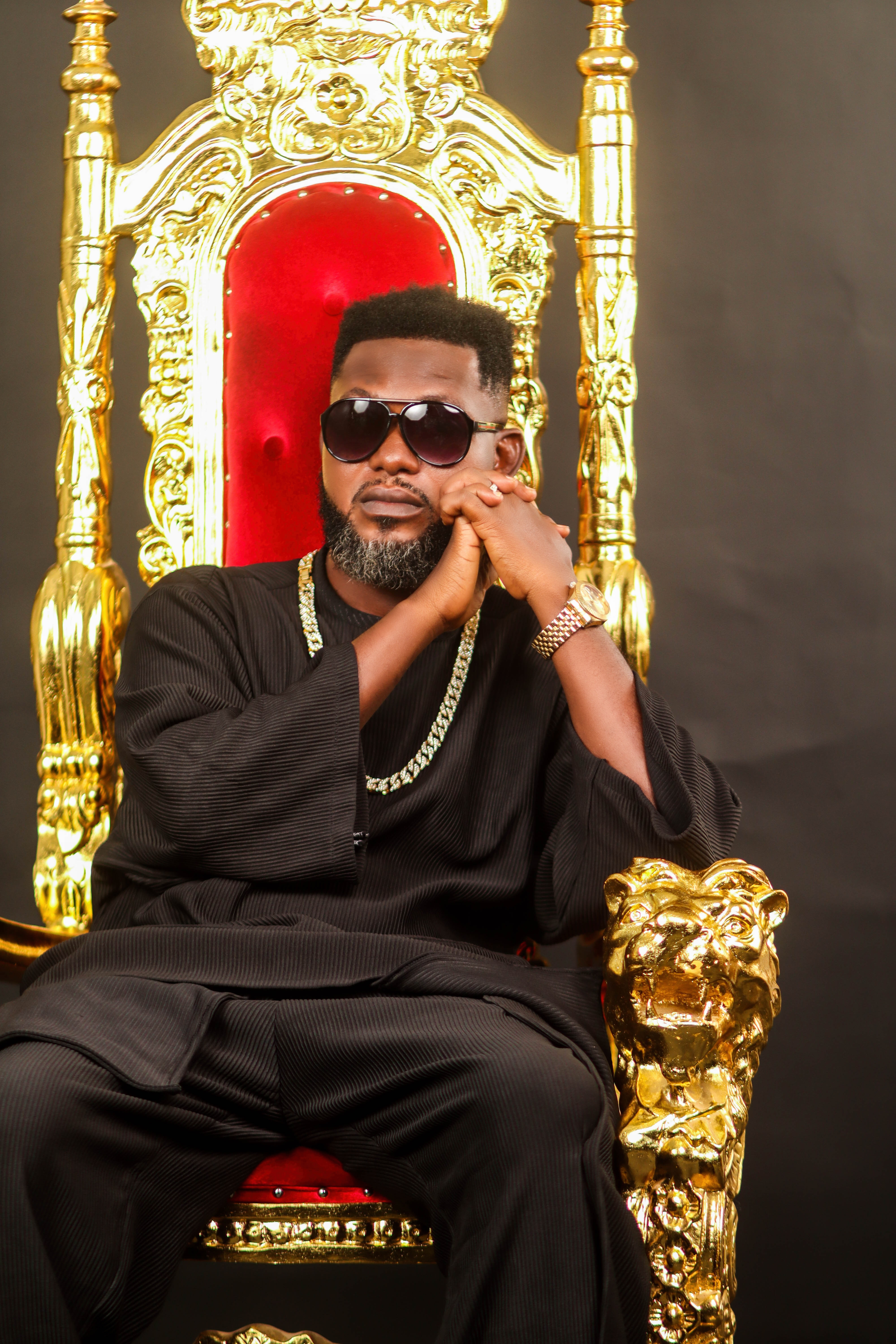

Background information
- Born: Ahmmed Kanneh Larweh; 2 February 1983 (age 43); Accra, Ghana
- Genres: Hiplife, Afrobeats
- Occupations: Musician, real estate developer
- Years active: 2003–present

Ahmmed Kanneh Larweh (born 2 February 1983), popularly known as Sparqlyn, is a Ghanaian Afrobeats musician and songwriter. He was a member of the defunct hiplife group, Dunsin. In January 2023, he was enstooled as the Development Chief at Krobo Odumase in the Eastern Region of Ghana.

== Early life and education ==
Sparqlyn was born in Accra. He attended Rives Academy International School and Asanteman Secondary School where he had his primary and secondary education.

== Music career ==
Sparqlyn, started music with the once-vibrant music group, Dunsin. He was under the name, Kele. Dunsin, a trio, released their maiden album in 2009 titled, ”Ɔyɛadeɛyie.” He is the first krobo rapper. Later in 2012, they released another album titled, ‘Kwansema’. Dunsin received a nomination for the Ghana Music Awards in 2017.

Sparqlyn went solo in 2018 after working with the group for over a decade. Sparqlyn was honored by MUSIGA in 2025 with two prestigious awards, one recognizing his Outstanding Contribution to the Ghana Music Industry and the other for his impact on Youth Empowerment.

== Awards and nominations ==
| Year | Award Ceremony | Award Presented | Nominated work/Recipient | Result | Ref |
|---|---|---|---|---|---|
| 2009 | Ghana Music Awards | Hiplife Song of the Year | Dunsin | Nominated | |
| 2010 | 4syte TV Music Video Awards | Best Group of The Year | Dunsin | Nominated | |
| 2010 | 4syte TV Music Video Awards | Best Choreography of The Year | Dunsin | Nominated | |
| 2010 | 4syte TV Music Video Awards | Best Storyline of The Year | Dunsin | Nominated | |
| 2017 | Ghana Music Awards | Best Group of The Year | Dunsin | Nominated | |

== Discography ==
=== Major singles ===
- Your body
- Tumpa
- Jump On Me
- All Is Gone

== Personal life ==
Sparqlyn works as a real estate developer. In 2023, he was enstooled as the development chief in Manya Krobo.

Sparqlyn is married to Adepa.
