= Upper Manya Krobo District =

- District
- Districts of Eastern Region

- Location of Upper Manya Krobo District within Eastern
- Coordinates: 6°24′N 0°9′W
- Country: Ghana
- Region: Eastern
- Capital: Asesewa

Government
  - District Executive: Felix Nartey Odjao

Population (2021)
  - Total: 70,676
- Time zone: UTC+0 (GMT)

Upper Manya Krobo District is one of the thirty-three districts in Eastern Region, Ghana. Formerly, it was part of the then-larger Manya Krobo District in 1988, which was created from the former Kaoga District Council, until the northwest part of the district was split off to create Upper Manya Krobo District on 29 February 2008; thus the remaining part has been renamed as Lower Manya Krobo District. The district assembly is located in the eastern part of Eastern Region and has Asesewa as its capital town.

== Sources ==
- "Upper Manya Krobo District". Statoids.
- Districts: Upper Manya Krobo District
