= Fentuo Tahiru Fentuo =

Ghanaian sports journalist

- Born: Vamboi, Ghana
- Education: Kanton Senior High School; University of Ghana; Elon University
- Occupation: Sports journalist
- Years active: 2013–present
- Known for: Football radio & TV commentary, web reporting & feature documentaries, sports business, sports communication, journalism & broadcasting
- Television: Joy Sports Center, Joy News Sports Review

Fentuo Tahiru Fentuo is a Ghanaian sports broadcast journalist and writer who serves as the Lead Sports Editor for the Multimedia Group Limited, based in Accra, Ghana.

== Early life and education ==
Fentuo attended basic school in Vamboi, a small village near Tumu in Ghana's Upper West Region. He continued his education at Bugubelle Junior Secondary School and later attended Kanton Senior High School for his senior high education. Fentuo holds a Bachelor of Arts degree in Psychology and English from the University of Ghana and Elon University in the United States.

== Career ==
Fentuo Tahiru Fentuo began his journalism career as an intern at Kumasi-based Kapital Radio, where he worked as a news reporter during vacations while studying at the University of Ghana. He later joined Ultimate FM in Kumasi, a subsidiary of the EIB Network, where he became the Head of Sports. In this role, he led the station's coverage of the 2014 FIFA World Cup, overseeing the organization of multiple fan parks and viewing centers across Kumasi. Fentuo later joined Accra-based Citi FM in 2017. He has extensively covered sporting events, including Ghana's national football and athletics teams. His work has been featured on international platforms such as the BBC, World Athletics, Time magazine, and TalkSport.

== See also ==
- George Addo Jr.
- Kwabena Yeboah
- Saddick Adams
