= List of presidents of the United States who were Freemasons =

Since the office of president of the United States was established in 1789, 45 (Note: As of 2025. While there have been 47 presidencies, only 45 individuals have served as president. Two presidents have served non-consecutive terms: Grover Cleveland is numbered as both the 22nd and 24th U.S. president, and Donald Trump is numbered as both the 45th and 47th U.S. president.) individuals have served in this capacity. Of these, 15, including Lyndon B. Johnson who took only the First Degree, are known to have been Freemasons, beginning with the nation's first president, George Washington. The most recent president to have undisputed membership is Gerald Ford. Ronald Reagan was granted an honorary membership in 1988, and Joe Biden was declared a "Mason at Sight" by the Prince Hall Grand Lodge of South Carolina in 2025, although it is disputed whether he accepted membership.

== List ==
The following U.S. presidents were Freemasons:

Name	Presidency	Details
George Washington (1732–1799)	1st • April 30, 1789 – March 4, 1797	Initiated on November 4, 1752, in Fredericksburgh Lodge No. 4, Fredericksburg, Virginia. Elected Worshipful Master on December 20, 1788
James Monroe (1758–1831)	5th • March 4, 1817 – March 4, 1825	Initiated on November 9, 1775, in Williamsburg Lodge No. 6, Williamsburg, Virginia at the age of 17 while studying at the College of William & Mary
Andrew Jackson (1767–1845)	7th • March 4, 1829 – March 4, 1837	Member of St. Tammany (later Harmony) Lodge No. 1, Nashville, Tennessee. Elected Grand Master of Tennessee on October 7, 1822, and served until October 4, 1824
James K. Polk (1795–1849)	11th • March 4, 1845 – March 4, 1849	Initiated on June 5, 1820, in Columbia Lodge No. 31, Columbia, Tennessee
James Buchanan (1791–1868)	15th • March 4, 1857 – March 4, 1861	Initiated on December 11, 1816, in Lodge No. 43, Lancaster, Pennsylvania. Appointed District Deputy Grand Master for the counties of Lancaster, Lebanon, and York in 1824
Andrew Johnson (1808–1875)	17th • April 15, 1865 – March 4, 1869	Initiated on May 5, 1851, in Greenville Lodge No. 119, Greeneville, Tennessee
James A. Garfield (1831–1881)	20th • March 4, 1881 – September 19, 1881	Initiated on November 19, 1861, in Magnolia Lodge No. 20, Columbus, Ohio and raised on November 22, 1864, in Columbus Lodge No. 30. Joined Garrettsville Lodge No. 246, Garrettsville, Ohio in 1866 and was its chaplain for the years 1868–69. Charter Member of Pentalpha Lodge No. 23, Washington, D.C.
William McKinley (1843–1901)	25th • March 4, 1897 – September 14, 1901	Initiated on May 1, 1865, in Hiram Lodge No. 21, Winchester, Virginia. Joined Canton Lodge No. 60, Canton, Ohio in 1867. Charter member of Eagle (later William McKinley) Lodge No. 431, also in Canton
Theodore Roosevelt (1858–1919)	26th • September 14, 1901 – March 4, 1909	Initiated on January 2, 1901, in Matinecock Lodge No. 806, Oyster Bay, New York. Raised to Master Mason on April 24, 1901
William H. Taft (1857–1930)	27th • March 4, 1909 – March 4, 1913	Made a Mason at sight on February 18, 1909, in Kilwinning Lodge No. 356, Cincinnati, Ohio
Warren G. Harding (1865–1923)	29th • March 4, 1921 – August 2, 1923	Initiated on June 28, 1901, in Marion Lodge No. 70, Marion, Ohio. Raised on August 27, 1920, in that Lodge. 32nd Degree member of Scioto Consistory, Ancient and Accepted Scottish Rite
Franklin D. Roosevelt (1882–1945)	32nd • March 4, 1933 – April 12, 1945	Initiated on October 11, 1911, in Holland Lodge No. 8, New York City. Made a Prophet-at-Sight in Tri-Po-Bed Grotto on October 30, 1931. Made Honorary Grand Master of the Order of DeMolay on April 13, 1934
Harry S. Truman (1884–1972)	33rd • April 12, 1945 – January 20, 1953	Initiated on February 9, 1909, in Belton Lodge No. 450, Belton, Missouri. First Worshipful Master of Grandview Lodge No. 618, Grandview, Missouri in 1911. Elected Grand Master of Missouri on September 25, 1940, and served until October 1, 1941. Received the 33rd Degree of the Scottish Rite on October 19, 1945. Made Honorary Grand Master of the Order of DeMolay on May 18, 1959
Lyndon B. Johnson (1908–1973)	36th • November 22, 1963 – January 20, 1969	Initiated as Entered Apprentice on October 30, 1937, in Johnson City Lodge No. 561 at Johnson City, Texas. Did not advance any further and did not become a full member of his lodge. Robert Caro does not mention Johnson's Masonic membership in Book One: The Path to Power of his four-volume biography of Johnson.
Gerald Ford (1913–2006)	38th • August 9, 1974 – January 20, 1977	Initiated on September 30, 1949, in Malta Lodge No. 465, Grand Rapids, Michigan. Passed on April 20, 1951, and raised on May 18 of that year in Columbia Lodge No. 3, Washington, D.C. Received the 33rd Degree on September 26, 1962. Made Honorary Grand Master of the Order of DeMolay in April 1975

In addition to the individuals listed above, Ronald Reagan was made an honorary Freemason in 1988, and as a youth, Bill Clinton was a member of the Masonic youth group Order of DeMolay.

== Disputed ==
Thomas Jefferson "is frequently, yet falsely, linked to the Freemasons,"; there is no record of him being initiated into any lodge, nor are there any references to Masonic membership in his personal papers.

Joe Biden was declared a Master Mason at sight by the Prince Hall Grand Lodge of South Carolina on January 19, 2025. The Pillar, however, have noted that "Biden would have to himself accept, even passively by not rejecting the designation, the conferred membership, the masons don’t have the power to make someone a member without consent, anymore than one person can marry another without their consent." They further question if this actually occurred, casting doubt on his Masonic membership. Others have raised questions of Biden's legitimacy as a Master Mason given that the Prince Hall Grand Lodge of South Carolina "is not recognized as regular by any so-called mainstream U.S. grand lodge, the United Grand Lodge of England, or any other major regular, recognized Masonic jurisdiction."

== Gallery ==
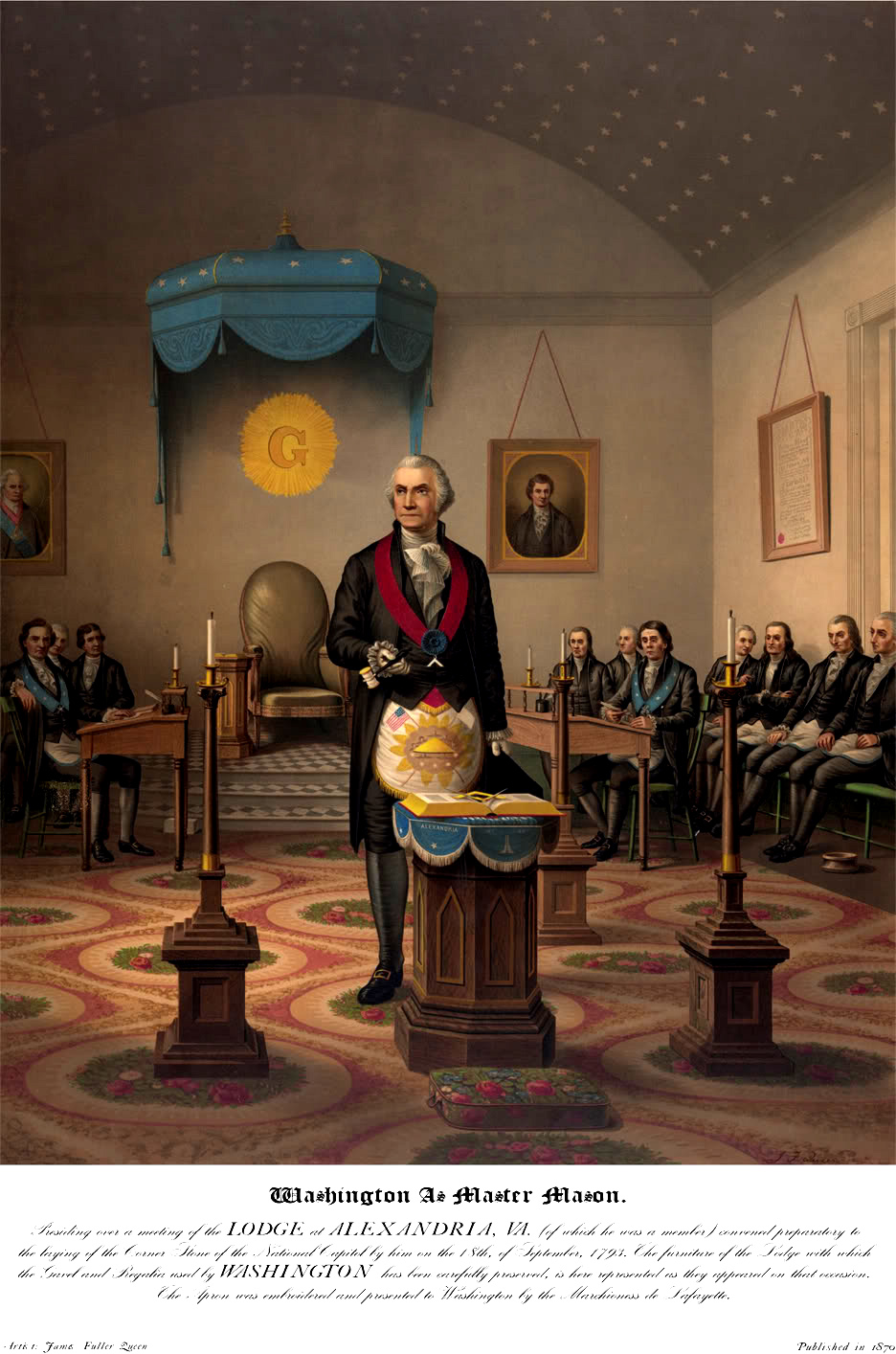
Print portraying George Washington as Master of his Lodge

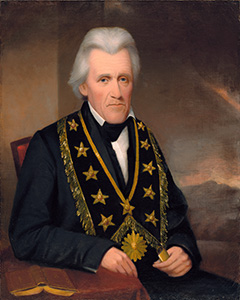
Portrait of Andrew Jackson in Masonic regalia as Grand Master

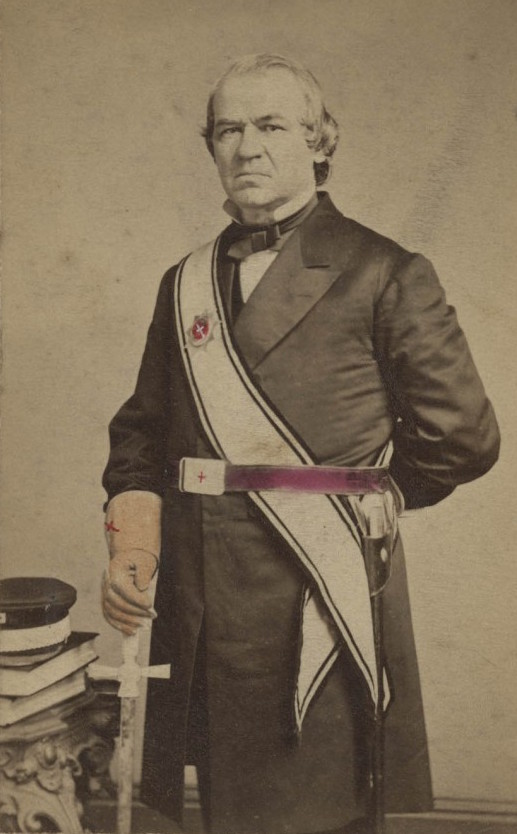
Photograph of Andrew Johnson in Masonic Knights Templar uniform

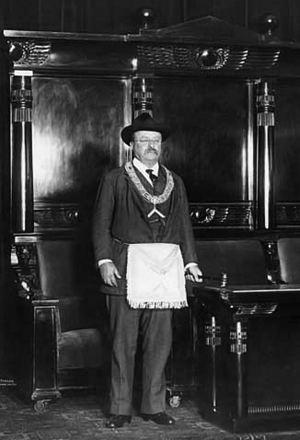
Photograph of Theodore Roosevelt in Spokane Masonic Temple 1905

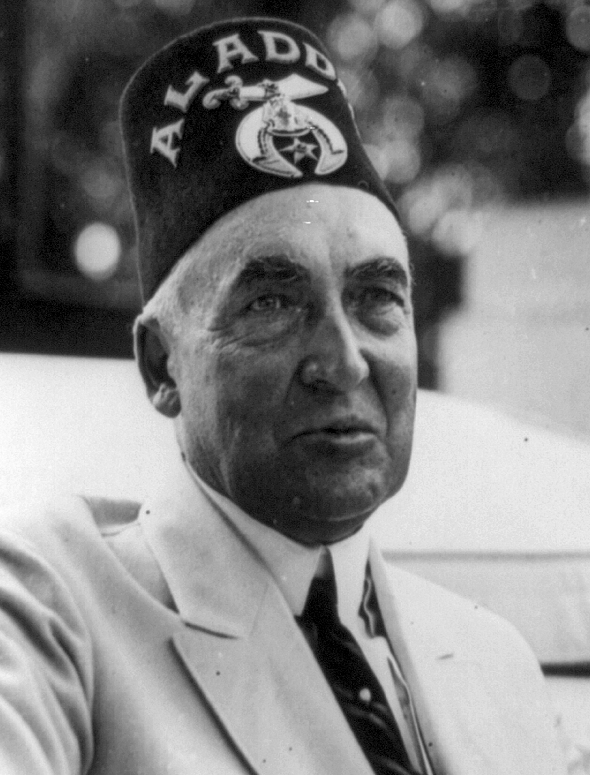
Photograph of Warren G. Harding wearing Masonic Shriner's fez

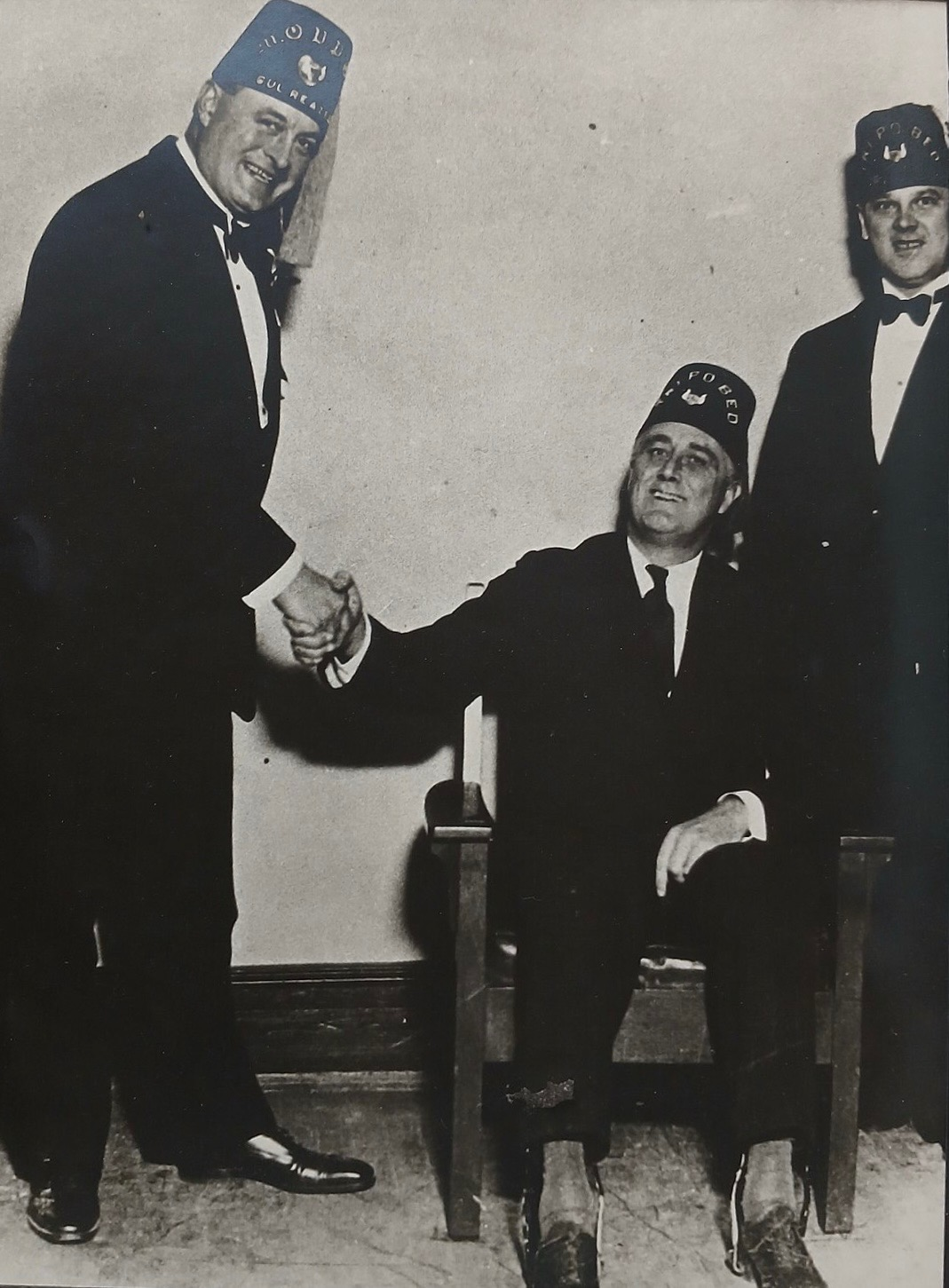
FDR becoming a member of Tri-Po-Bed Grotto

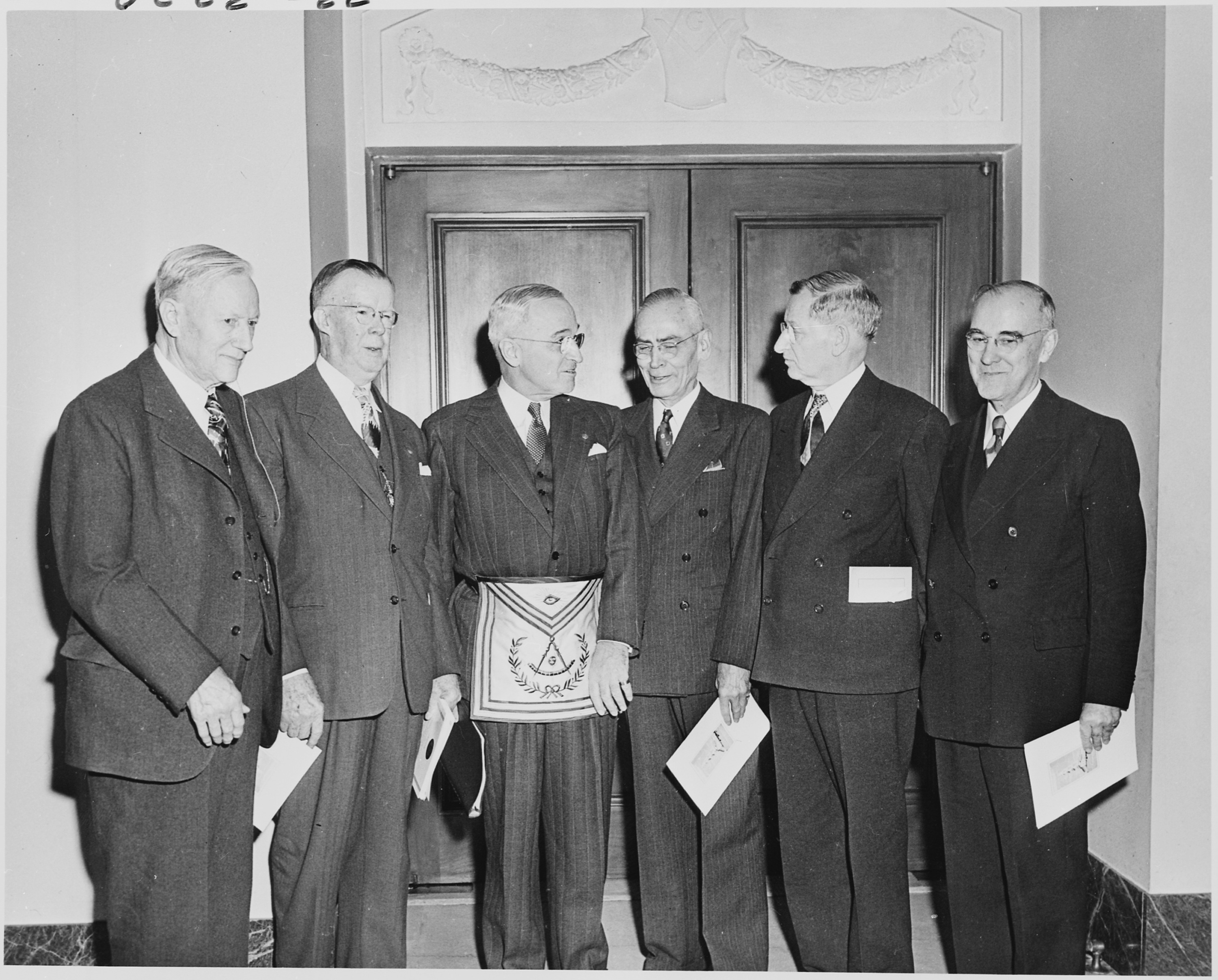
Photograph of Harry S. Truman wearing Masonic regalia, with other dignitaries at the Masonic National Memorial

== See also ==
- List of monarchs who were Freemasons
