= Kaoga District =

- Former District Council
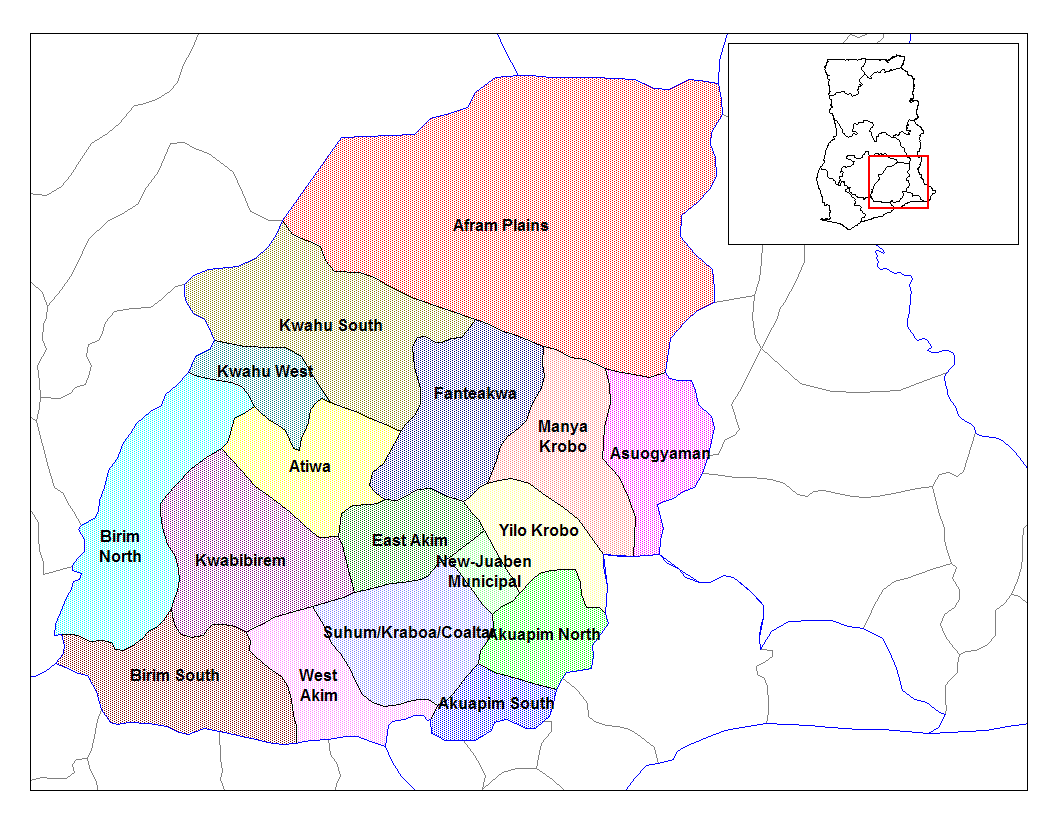
- Districts of Eastern Region

- Location of Kaoga District within Eastern
- Coordinates: 6°6′18″N 0°0′57.6″W
- Country: Ghana
- Region: Eastern
- Capital: Somanya
- Time zone: UTC+0 (GMT)

Kaoga District is a former district council that was located in Eastern Region, Ghana. Originally created as an ordinary district assembly in 1975. However on 10 March 1989, it was split off into three new district assemblies: Yilo Krobo District (capital: Somanya), Manya Krobo District (capital: Odumase) and Asuogyaman District (capital: Atimpoku). The district assembly was located in the eastern part of Eastern Region and had Somanya as its capital town.
