= Emmanuel Mate Kole =

Ghanaian educator, paramount chief and statesman

Nene Sir Azzu Mate Kole I
- Kt

Konor of Manya Krobo Traditional Area
- Reign: 1892–1939
- Coronation: 1939
- Predecessor: Sakite I
- Successor: Nene Azzu Mate Kole II
- Born: Emmanuel Mate Kole; 1860; Krobo Odumase
- Died: 1939 (aged 78–79); Manya Krobo District
- Issue: Azzu Mate Kole II
- House: Odumase Dynasty
- Father: Peter Nyarko
- Religion: Presbyterian
- Occupation: Educator; Paramount chief

Emmanuel Mate Kole or Nene Sir Azzu Mate Kole I, Kt (1860 in Krobo Odumase – 1939) was the third Konor, or paramount chief, of the Manya Krobo from 1892 until his death in 1939. He was succeeded by his son, Nene Azzu Mate Kole II, who ruled Manya Krobo from 1939 until his death in 1990.

A former teacher in Basel Mission schools who trained at the Basel Mission Seminary, Akropong, he encouraged agricultural development and road-building as a ruler. In 1911, despite opposition from the Gold Coast Aborigines Rights Protection Society, he became the first African chief to be appointed to the Gold Coast Legislative Council.
