= Asanteman Senior High School =

Location
- Kumasi, Ashanti Region; Ghana; 6.7091°N 1.6282°W

Information
- Type: Coeducational public high school
- Motto: Servez l'un et l'autre
- Founded: 1954 (72 years ago)
- Founder: Asanteman Council
- Status: Active
- School district: Kumasi Metropolitan Assembly
- Oversight: Ministry of Education
- Authorizer: Otumfour Osei Tutu
- School code: 0050101
- President: Otumfour Osei Tutu
- Gender: Co-educational
- Age: 14 to 19
- Classes offered: Home economics, General science, general arts, business, visual art
- Houses: 12
- Colours: White, Green and Yellow
- Slogan: Nananom ayɛ bi
- Mascot: Porcupine
- Nickname: Asass
- Test average: 70%
- Affiliation: Ashanti Kingdom
- Alumni: Nananom
- Website: asantemanschool.edu.gh

Asanteman Senior High School (often known as Asass) is a co-educational second-cycle institution in Kumasi in the Ashanti Region of Ghana.

The school is regarded as the official school of the Ashanti Empire, with the Asantehene being the patron of the school.

Students are known as "Nananom" an Asante word meaning "Kings and Queens". Due to its affiliations to the Ashanti Kingdom, the school holds cultural and traditional practices in the highest esteem. The school has prided itself as grooming grounds of kings and queens, where students are edified on the cultures of the Ashanti kingdom. Which is why upon completion, students assume the title “Nana” which means a King or a Queen.

== Overview ==
The school is graded a category A school according to the Ghana Education Service rankings.

Over the last 17 years, the school has seen great improvement in academics and extra-curricular activities such as sports. It was regarded as the 4th best school in Ashanti region in the wassce 2014 results

The school has over the last ten years been ranked between 16 and 22 among about 138 schools in the Ashanti Region for the annual West African Senior High School Certificate Examinations. Most of the entire student's population advances to tertiary institutions every year. Almost 70 percent of this figure going to the University of Cape Coast.

== History ==
The school was founded as a co-educational day school in 1954 by the Asante Youth Association (AYA) in response to the growing demands for more second-cycle educational institutions in Ashanti. The school remained under the aegis of AYA until 1962 when it was absorbed into the public system by the government and from then on it grew from an initial one stream to three streams in the 1980s. Presently, the school runs ten streams in each of the three forms with a student population of about 1,500, 65 masters and 29 non-teaching staff.

The school was the fourth school to be established in the Ashanti Region and it was established in 1954.

== Student housing ==
The residential status of the school for students is both boarding and day. With about 70% of the students population in the school's boarding house system. There are 6 houses for boys, each with its female counterpart house, making a total of 12 houses. The houses are named after the attributes of past Kings and Queens of the Ashanti Kingdom, which also happens to be the slogan of some of the senior high schools in the Ashanti region.

Male House Female House 1. Akatakyie House Adehyee House 2. Mmarima House Ahemaa House 3. Akunini House Owoahene House 4. Amanfour House Osiahene House 5. Abrempong House Nnwuraba House 6. Osahene House Ahoufe House

Houses have however been nicknamed by student as old Trafford, Bangladesh, Melcom and Kejetia. One state-of-the-art building in the school has also been named Golden Tulip, after the city's only four-star hotel, as it bear resemblance.

== Notable alumni ==
- Kofi Jamar, musician
- Saddick Adams, sports journalist
- Sparqlyn, musician

== See also ==
- Education in Ghana
- List of senior high schools in Ashanti Region
