= Angel TV =

Ghanaian television channel

- Country: Ghana

Ownership
- Owner: Angel Broadcasting Network Limited

Links
- Website: angeltvghana.com

Angel TV is a television channel in Ghana. It is part of the Angel Broadcasting Network, a media company controlled by Kwaku Oteng, alongside a chain of radio stations. Studios are located in Accra.

== History ==
The Ghana Police Service raided Angel TV in 2016 after the local subsidiary of MultiChoice, which owns SuperSport, protested that Angel TV was airing Euro 2016 and the 2016 Summer Olympics without permission; SuperSport was the rights holder for Ghana.

In August 2021, a fire gutted the studios of Angel TV, damaging all of the channel's equipment. In spite of the building being a near-total loss, the channel returned to air within 24 hours.
