= Sunyani Technical University =

Public technical university in Ghana

Coordinates: 7°19′17″N 2°19′00″W

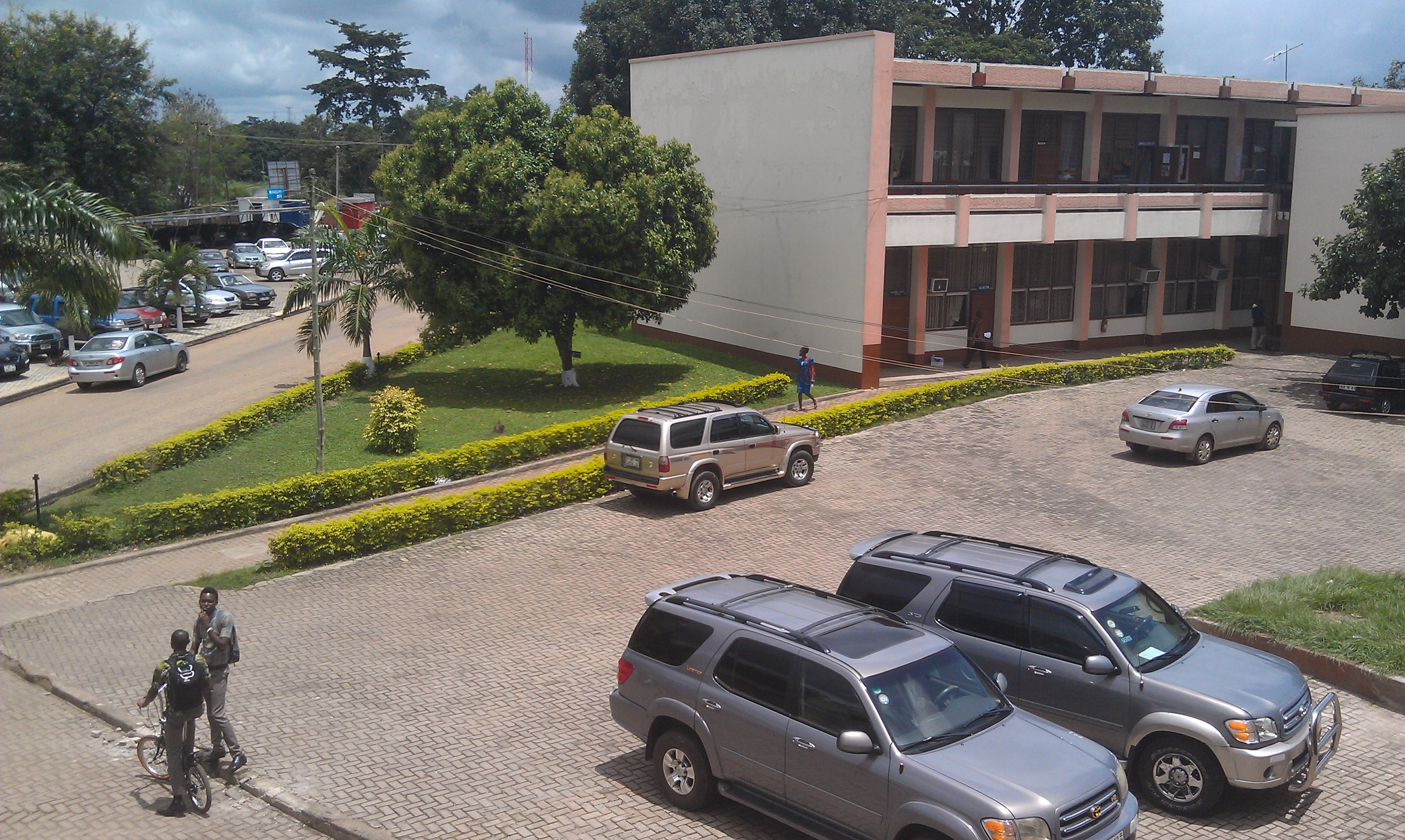
Sunyani Polytechnic

The Sunyani Technical University (STU) (formally known as Sunyani Polytechnic) is a public tertiary institution in the Bono Region of Ghana. It is located northeast of Asufufu.

STU was established as a Technical Institute in 1967 (59 years ago), as a non-tertiary institution, under the Ghana Education Service. It was subsequently upgraded to a Polytechnic in 1997 (29 years ago) by the Government of Ghana, to run Higher National Diploma (HND) programmes. The Polytechnics Act, 2007 mandated the Polytechnics in Ghana to run and award Higher National Diploma (HND) Certificates, Diplomas and other higher degrees, subject to the approval of the Polytechnic Councils.

== Faculty and departments ==
Faculty of Applied Science & Technology

- Computer Science
- General Agriculture
- Hospitality & Tourism
- Pharmacy Technician

Faculty of Engineering

- Civil Engineering
- Electrical & Electronic Engineering
- Mechanical Engineering
- Materials Engineering

Faculty of Built Environment & Applied Art

- Building Technology
- Visual & Industrial Art
- Wood Technology

Faculty of Business & Management Studies

- Accountancy
- Communication Studies
- Marketing
- Procurement & Supply Chain Management
- Secretaryship & Management Studies

== Programme ==
- B.Tech. Civil Engineering
- B.Tech. Management
- B.Tech Hospitality Management (Top-up)
- B.Tech Accounting Technology (Top-up)
- B.Tech Electrical and Electronic Engineering (Top-up)
- B.Tech General Agriculture (Top-up)
- HND Accountancy
- B.Tech Mechanical Engineering (Top-up)
- B.Tech Photonics Engineering
- HND Computerized Accounting
- B.Tech Procurement and Supply Chain Management (Top-up)
- HND Dispensing Technician (Pharmacy Technician)
- HND Ceramic Art
- HND Interior Design and Technology
- B.Tech Building Technology
- B.Tech Industrial Art (Printing Option)
- B.Tech Industrial Art (Textile Option)
- HND Computer Science
- HND Fashion Design Technology
- B.Tech. Fashion Design
- HND Information Communication Technology
- HND Materials Engineering
- HND Purchasing and Supply
- HND Textile Design Technology

== Cultural museum ==
STU plans to build a cultural museum on the history of the former Brong Ahafo Region.

== See also ==
- List of universities in Ghana
- Education in Ghana
