= Yilo Krobo Municipal District =

- Municipal District
- Districts of Eastern Region

- Location of Yilo Krobo Municipal District within Eastern
- Coordinates: 6°6′18″N 0°0′57.6″W
- Country: Ghana
- Region: Eastern
- Capital: Somanya

Government
  - Municipal Chief Executive: Hon. Eric Tetteh

Area
  - Total: 594 km^{2} (229 sq mi)

Population (2021)
  - Total: 122,705
- Time zone: UTC+0 (GMT)

Yilo Krobo Municipal District is one of the thirty-three districts in Eastern Region, Ghana. Originally created as an ordinary district assembly in 1988 when it was known as Yilo Krobo District, which it was created from the former Kaoga District Council, until it was elevated to municipal district assembly status on 6 February 2012 to become Yilo Krobo Municipal District. The municipality is located in the eastern part of Eastern Region and has Somanya as its capital town.

== Geography ==
Yilo Krobo Municipality is approximately between latitude 60.00’N and 00.30’N and between longitude 00.30’ and 10.00’W. It covers an estimated area of 805 km^{2} (311 sq mi), constituting 4.2 percent of the total area of the Eastern Region with Somanya as its capital. Yilo Krobo Municipality is bounded in the north and east by Lower Manya Krobo District, in the South by Akuapim North District and on the West by New-Juaben Municipal District, East Akim Municipal District and Fanteakwa District. The municipality has about two hundred and thirty settlements out of which only the municipal capital, Somanya and Nkurakan have populations of above 5,000. The municipality is divided into seven (7) Zonal Councils namely: Somanya, Oterkpolu, Boti, Nkurakan, Nsutapong, Klo-Agogo and Obawale

=== Climate ===
The Yilo Krobo Municipality lies within the dry equatorial climatic zone which experiences substantial amount of precipitation. This is characterized by a bi-modal rainy season, which reaches its maximum during the two peak periods of May – June and September – October. The annual rainfall is between 750mm in the southeast and 1600mm on the slopes of the ranges in the northwest. Temperature ranges between a minimum of 24.90 C and a maximum of 29.90 C. A relative humidity of 60 – 93 percent is a characteristic of the municipality.

=== Vegetation ===
The municipality lies within the semi-deciduous rain forest and the coastal savannah zone of the country. There is the dry semi-deciduous (fire zone) which stretches from the municipality to the lower part of the Lower Manya Krobo Municipality covering 855 square kilometres. Tree types that are most widespread in the municipality include palm, mango, nim, ceiba and acassia. The coastal savannah zone in the south-eastern part forms part of the Accra plains.

=== Topography and drainage ===
The area is predominantly mountainous. The Akwapim Ranges stretch into the municipality from southwest to northeast across the municipality. With its accompanying deep valleys, it provides an undulating landscape. The low lands are in the south-eastern part of the municipality. The rocks forming the ranges are called the Togo series, which include quartzites, phyllites, sandstones, phyllonites and sandy-shades. The quartzites in the municipality are hard, massively bedded rocks but occasionally flaky varieties occur. They are fine to median grained sand but grayish when fresh. On the average, the height of the highlands in the municipality ranges between 300 and 500 metres above sea level. There is a scarp rising up to 600 metres, which forms the boundary with the New Juaben Municipality. On the south-eastern part of the municipality is the Krobo Mountains from where it is believed the Yilo people migrated to the present area

== Population size and distribution ==
According to the 2010 Population and Housing Census (PHC) report, Yilo Krobo has a total population of 87,847 which comprises 42,378 males (48.2%) and 45,469 females (54.8%); depicting more females than males. This represents 3.3 percent of the regional population. With a growth rate (crude) of about 1.25%, the municipality's population stood at 91,183 as at the end of 2013.

About 30.92 percent of the population lives in urban centres whilst 69.8 percent lives in rural areas. This might be because the municipality is more rural than urban. For all groups of ages, most people are living in the rural areas as compared to the urban areas. This could be because the main occupation in the municipality is farming. The municipality must therefore fashion out strategies to development the agricultural sector and growth of other settlements. Table 1.8 shows the population size by locality of residence, the sex ratio and the percentage the municipality covers in the region.

Sex ratio is the ratio of males to females in a given population, usually expressed as the number of males per 100 females. The sex ratio for Yilo Krobo Municipality is 93.20 meaning there are about 93 males, for every 100 females.

=== Migration ===
The total number of migrants in Yilo Krobo Municipality was 27,474 (2010 PHC). Out of this, about 69 percent which is equivalent to 19,045 persons were born in the same region but leaving elsewhere other than their place of birth in that same region (intra-regional migration). The Volta, Greater Accra and Ashanti regions are relatively large in-migrant areas in the municipality, i.e., 2,429, 1,931 and 1,188 persons respectively. The Greater Accra and Volta regions are very close to the municipality and this might explain why people easily move from those regions to the municipality to trade. The least in-migrant areas are Upper East and Upper West regions i.e. 77 and 57 persons respectively. This might also be because these regions are the farthest from the municipality so very few migrants move from those places to the municipality to trade. Those who migrate might do so because of marriage since Upper East had the highest percentage (29.9) of persons who have stayed in the municipality for twenty years and above.

=== Household Size ===
The total number of households in the Yilo Krobo Municipality is 20,613. Out of this, 13,145 households are headed by males and the remaining 7, 468 by females. As the number of household size increases, the number of persons constituting such households decreases. Few persons have household sizes of 8 and above. The average household size for the Yilo Krobo municipality is 4.2. This means that on the average each household in the municipality is made up of 4 persons. It is interesting to note that the average household size of male headed households is about 3 (3.2) while that of the female is 6.0 which is almost twice that of the males. This might be because most of the time when women head a household, they bring their relatives and family friends to stay with them. This in turn increases the number of persons living in the household

== Sources ==
- "Yilo Krobo Municipal District". Statoids.
- Districts: Yilo Krobo Municipal District
- Yilo Krobo Municipal District - Eastern Region
