= Asesewa =

- Town
- Location of Asesewa in Eastern Region, Ghana
- Coordinates: 6°24′N 0°09′W
- Country: Ghana
- Region: Eastern Region
- District: Upper Manya Krobo District
- Elevation: 1,024 ft (312 m)
- Time zone: GMT
  - Summer (DST): GMT

Asesewa is a small town and the district capital of Upper Manya Krobo district in the Eastern region of southern Ghana. It is a historic trading post with a mix of cultures from all over Ghana. It is located about 45 kilometres (28 mi) from the regional capital of Eastern region, Koforidua.

Asesewa has a senior high school. The school is a second cycle institution. The Asesewa Government Hospital is the only hospital that serves the district.
