= Odumase dynasty =

Ghanaian royal house

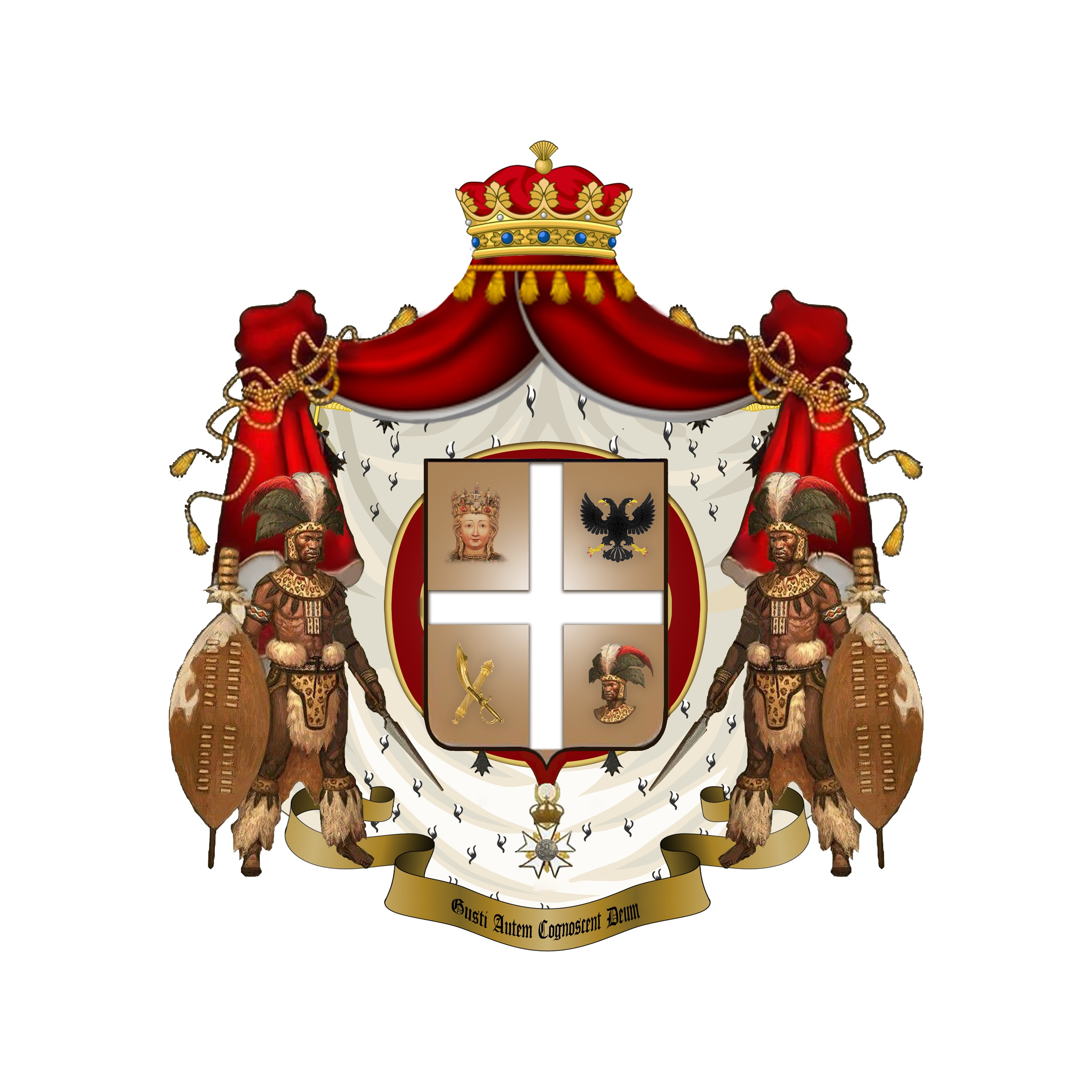
Coat of Arms of the Royal House of Afra of Saint Agatha Virgin and Martyr, consisting of the Principalities of Saint Agatha of Gomoa Odumase, Badougbe’ Adjome’, and Odo-Oko Idado Ijesa

The Odumase dynasty is the royal house of the Manya Krobo Traditional Area in the Eastern Region of Ghana. The monarch of the Odumase dynasty is the konor, or paramount chief.

The royal family rule the traditional Principality of Saint Agatha of Gomoa Odumase / Kingdom of Gomoa Odumase. Nana Akomanyi Essandoh V is the self-proclaimed sovereign.
