= Somanya =

- Town
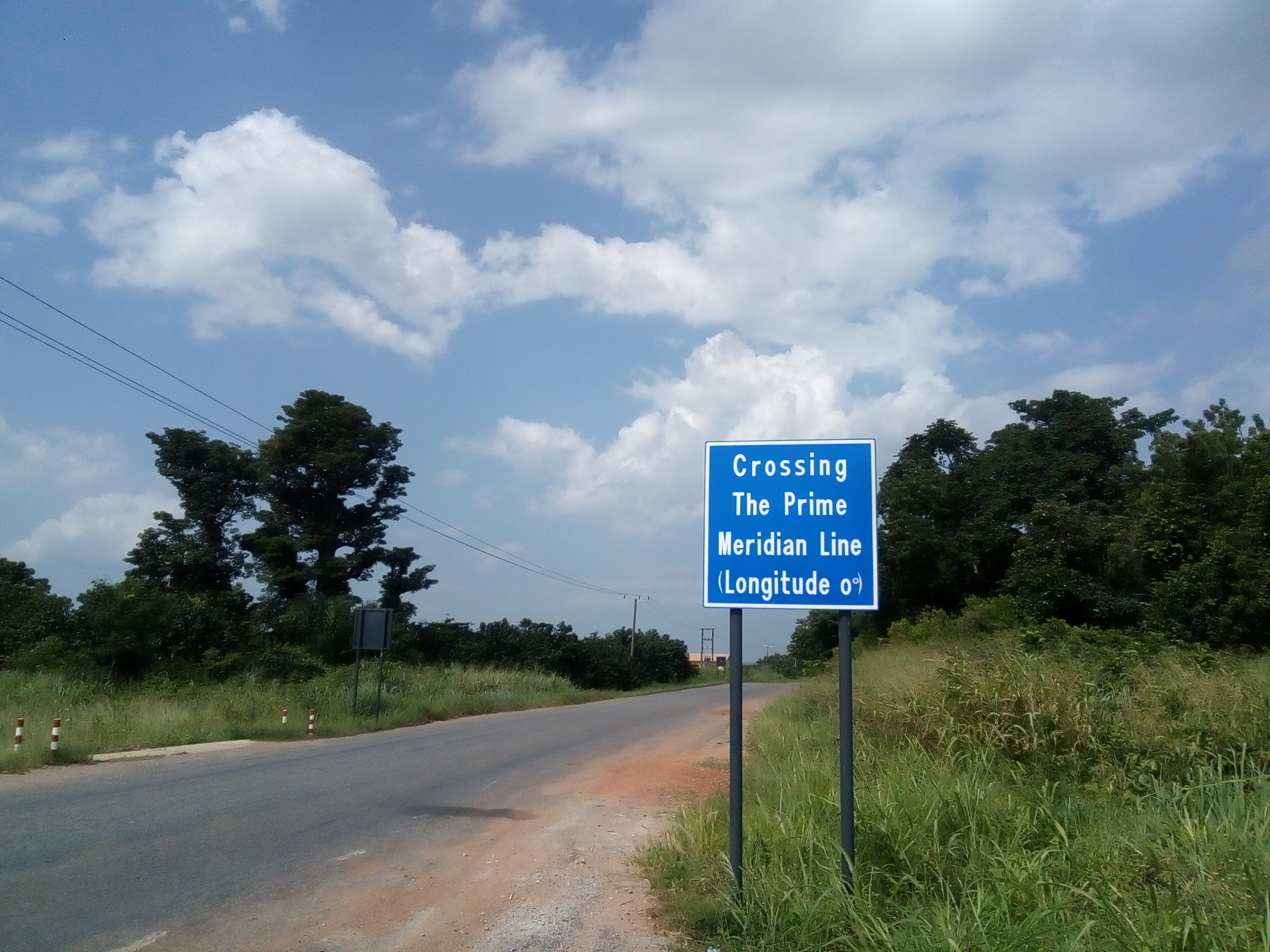
- Sign outside Somanya marking prime meridian

- Location of Somanya in Eastern Region
- Coordinates: 6°6′14″N 0°0′54″W
- Country: Ghana
- Region: Eastern Region
- District: Yilo Krobo Municipal District

Population (2013)
  - Total: 20,596
- Time zone: GMT
  - Summer (DST): GMT

Somanya is a town and the capital of Yilo Krobo Municipal District, a district in the Eastern Region of south Ghana. Somanya has a 2013 settlement population of 20,596 people. And currently has a settlement population of 16,441,362 in the year 2021. Because the town is surrounded by a number of farming communities to the north of it, the name Somanya is used to encompass a collection of smaller communities around a bigger one. As a result, the 2010 Population and Housing Census conducted by the Government of Ghana put the population of Somanya at 87,847, representing 3.3% of the region's total population. Males constitute 48.2 percent of the population while females represent 51.8 percent, according to the Ghana Census Bureau. The entire Krobo district is described as rural, and Somanya is the municipal district center of the surrounding smaller towns. With the capital of Ghana, Accra, rapidly expanding northwards, the traveling distance between Somanya and Accra is shrinking and now is around 30 miles (48 km). The temperatures are highest on average in March, at around 28.4 °C. At 25.1 °C on average, August is the coldest month of the year.

== Household size, composition, and structure ==
The municipal has a household population of 86,567 with a total number of 20,613 households. The average household size in the municipality is 4.2 persons per household. Children constitute the largest proportion of the household structure accounting for 39.4 percent. Spouses form about 10.5 percent. Nuclear households (head, spouse(s) and children) constitute 26.3 percent of the total number of households in the district.
