= Manya Krobo District =

- Former District
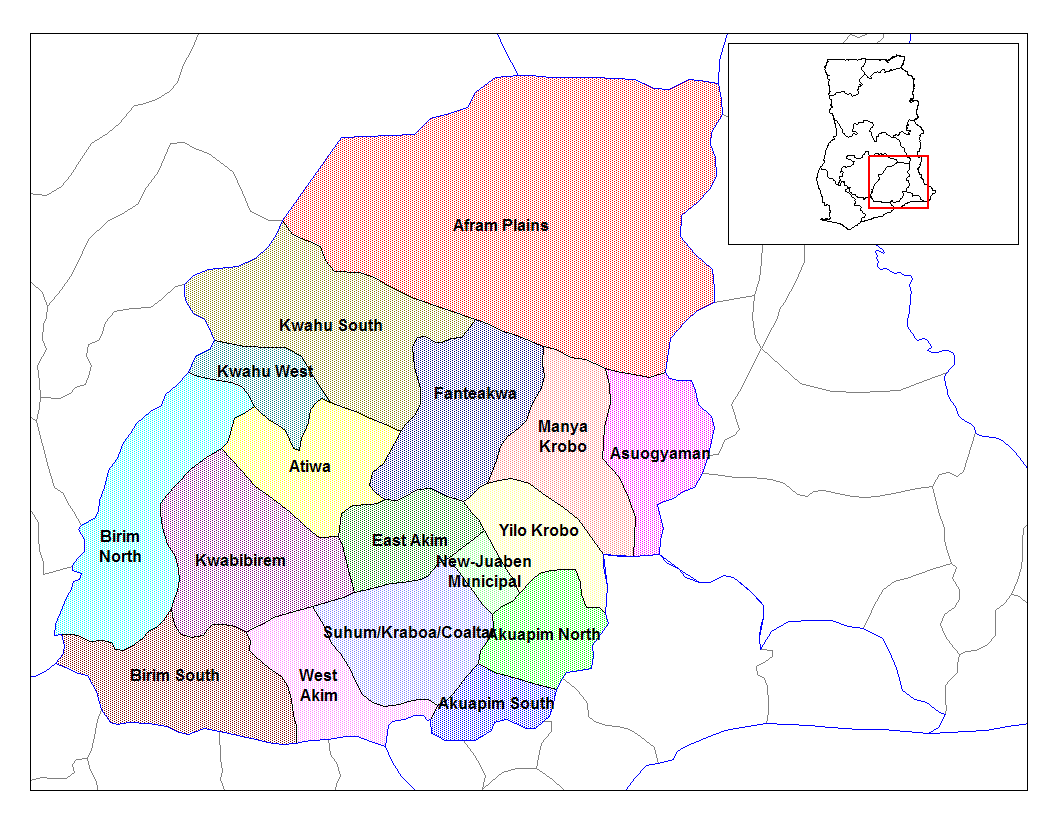
- Districts of Eastern Region

- Location of Manya Krobo District within Eastern
- Coordinates: 6°6′7.56″N 0°32′0.24″W
- Country: Ghana
- Region: Eastern
- Capital: Odumase

Area
  - Total: 819 km^{2} (316 sq mi)
- Time zone: UTC+0 (GMT)
- ISO 3166 code: GH-EP-MK

Manya Krobo District is a municipality located in Eastern Region, Ghana. Originally created as an ordinary district assembly in 1988, which was created from the former Kaoga District Council. However on 29 February 2008, it was split off into two new districts: Lower Manya Krobo District (which it was elevated to municipal district assembly status on 6 February 2012; capital: Odumase) and Upper Manya Krobo District (capital: Asesewa). The municipal assembly is located in the eastern part of Eastern Region and has Odumase as its capital town.

== Notable people ==
Notably, professional footballer Thomas Partey is a chief of the Manya Krobo people.

== Post-deamalgamation ==
=== Upper Manya Krobo ===
The capital of Upper Manya Krobo District is Asesewa which is about 45km drive from Koforidua, the capital of the Eastern Region. It was created in 2008 by Legislative Instrument 1842. . It is located in the North-Eastern corner of the Eastern Region. It shares common boundaries with the following districts; to the North, Afram Plains, to the South- East, Lower Manya Krobo,to the South-West, Yilo Krobo, to the East, Asuogyaman,and to the West Fanteakwa.

It covers an area of 885 square kilometers constituting 4.6% of the total land area of the Eastern Region of Ghana.

According to the 2021 Population and Housing Census, the population of the District is 70,676 with 35,620 males and 35,056 females.

=== Lower Manya Krobo ===
The Lower Manya Krobo covers an area of 316 square kilometers constituting about 8.1% of the total land area in the Eastern Region (18,310km). The capital of the district is Odumase. The Municipality shares boundaries with Upper Manya Krobo to the North,Shai Osudoku to the South, Yilo Krobo to the West, and Asuogyaman to the East.

The population of the Municipality according to the 2021 Population and Housing Census stands at 121,478 with 56,662 males and 64,816 females.

== See also ==
- Odumase dynasty

== Sources ==
- "Manya Krobo District". Statoids.
- Districts: Manya Krobo District
- Lower Manya Krobo Website
