= Krobo Odumase =

Odumase Krobo Osumaase
- Town
- Location of Odumase Krobo in Eastern Region, Ghana
- Coordinates: 6°09′N 0°01′E
- Country: Ghana
- Region: Eastern Region
- District: Lower Manya Krobo District
- Elevation: 702 ft (214 m)
- Time zone: GMT
  - Summer (DST): GMT

Krobo Odumase is a town and capital of Lower Manya Krobo Municipal District in the Eastern Region of Ghana. The Presbyterian Boys' Senior High School was formerly located here.

== Prominent sites ==
The town is a proposed site for the construction of University of Environment, Science, Technology and Innovation.

== History ==
The Basel Mission ran a school in Odumase Krobo by 1857. The town became Manya Krobo's capital when Emmanuel Mate Kole became Konor in 1892.

== Economy ==
The town, famous for its glass beadmaking, hosted the First Ghana International Beads Festival in August 2009. The town has its bead markets every Wednesday and Saturday at the Agormanya market.

== Culture ==
At the end of October the town hosts the seven-day Ngmayem festival.

The town is noted for the performance of the Dipo rite.

== Notable people ==
- Tetteh Adzedu (born 1949), fashion designer
- Thomas Partey (born 1993), association football player
- Sparqlyn (born 1983), musician
