= Climate change adaptation in Ghana =

Climate in Ghana

Ghana became a party to the UNFCCC in September 1995, and ratified the Paris Agreement in September 2016. As a party to the Paris Agreement, Ghana is expected to develop a National Adaptation Plan, that outlines strategies the country is taking to adjust to the changing climatic conditions.

Climate change adaptation involves modifying or developing structure to help one live with the influence of actual or expected future climate. The goal of adaptation is to reduce the impacts of the harmful effects of climate change (like sea-level rise, more intense extreme weather events, or food insecurity). It also includes making the most of any potential beneficial opportunities associated with climate change.

Ghana's development—both human and economic—is susceptible to climate change. Around 45,000 Ghanaians are impacted by flooding annually on average, and half of the country's coastline is at risk of erosion and flooding due to sea level rise. Without immediate action, crop and labor productivity will be impacted by rising temperatures and heat stress, and infrastructure and structures will be harmed by more unpredictable rainfall patterns. Human capital and productivity will also be hampered by local air pollution, water insecurity, and land degradation.

It is approximated that climate change will add to the human and economic toll of floods and droughts in Ghana, which will have direct impacts on key development areas like food security, water resource management, health, and economic growth.

Against this backdrop, the government of Ghana and other International Development Partners, have set out approaches to determine vulnerability and adaptation priorities, and to join this knowledge into development and sectoral planning.

== Key sector vulnerabilities ==
=== Food security ===
Ghana's economy is heavily dependent on climate-sensitive sectors such as agriculture, which makes the protection and preservation of the natural environment a necessary pre-condition for the creation of a robust food system. The agriculture and livestock sectors are the backbone of Ghana's food security and economy, as they employ over half of the 32 million population of Ghana. Agriculture constitutes 33% of the country's gross domestic product. The effects of climate change, as evident in rising temperatures and the extreme incidence of drought, are of particular concern, as they result in a range of direct and indirect impacts affecting the agriculture and livestock sectors. In 2016, about 5% of the Ghana population faced food insecurity and about 2 million people faced the threat of becoming food insecure.

=== Water resources ===
Water resources in Ghana are already affected by climate variability, and are highly vulnerable to climate change. Climate change may affect the quantity and quality of water available for human consumption at a given time, as well as for agriculture, industry, and hydropower. Temperature increases may decrease river runoff, and changes in precipitation may affect both runoff and groundwater recharge. Furthermore, with an estimated 25% of the population currently lacking access to clean water, climate change will only make Ghana's water crisis worsen. The availability of fresh water is vital to Ghana's social and economic development, which is why it is important to understand the relationship between climate change and its affects on water resources in order to implement specific policies to combat it.

=== Health ===
Studies have indicated that more than half of the diseases in Ghana are linked to climate vulnerability and climate change. It is projected that climate change may lead to higher infection rates of diseases such as malaria, dengue fever and meningitis. As climatic conditions change, vectors of parasites that cause diseases such as malaria and yellow fever have been found in regions where they were not found originally. The sensitivity of different populations to climate change-related impacts on health may be exacerbated by poverty-related issues such as malnutrition and poor sanitation. In addition, the country's adaptive capacity, or its ability to anticipate, be prepared for, and respond to these impacts, are limited as factors such as a low number of health facilities and medical personnel will result in limited access to health care. According to WHO estimates, 600 million people have foodborne infections each year, while 2 billion people lack access to safe drinking water. Children under the age of five account for 30% of foodborne deaths. Risks of foodborne and waterborne illnesses are increased by climate stresses. 770 million people experienced hunger in 2020, mostly in Asia and Africa. Food and nutrition problems are made worse by how climate change impacts the quantity, quality, and diversity of food available.

== National strategies, plan, and institutions ==
The Environmental Protection Agency (EPA) is an independent environmental regulatory agency within the Government of Ghana with the responsibility of ensuring Ghana's environmental quality through environmental regulation and enforcement, and mainstreaming environmental concerns within the development process at the national, regional, and district levels. The implementation of climate change adaptation projects and the mainstreaming of climate change adaptation throughout the government and private sector are carried out by the Ministry of Environment, Science, Technology and Innovation (MESTI).
