= Ernest Amano Boateng =

Ghanaian academic

E. A. Boateng
- Born: Ernest Amano Boateng; 30 November 1920; Gold Coast
- Died: 15 July 1997 (aged 76); Aburi, Gold Coast
- Occupation: Academic
- Spouse: Evelyn Kensema Danso (m. 1955)
- Relatives: Josiah Ofori Boateng (brother)

Academic background
- Education: University of Oxford

Academic work
- Institutions: University of Ghana & University of Cape Coast
- Main interests: Geography

Ernest Amano Boateng (30 November 1920 – 15 July 1997) was a Ghanaian academic and public servant. He was an emeritus professor of geography who taught at the University of Ghana. He was the first vice chancellor of the University of Cape Coast and the first chairman of the then Environmental Protection Council of Ghana, now Ghana Environmental Protection Agency. He served in various capacities in many institutions, including as president of the Ghana Academy of Arts and Sciences and as chairman of the West African Examinations Council.

== Early life and education ==
Ernest was born on 30 November 1920. His father was the Reverend Christian Robert Boateng, a reverend minister of the Presbyterian Church of Ghana, and his mother, Adelaide Akonobea Boateng, both of Aburi, Ghana.

He was educated at Achimota College and St Peter's Hall, now St Peter's College, University of Oxford, England, where he read history and geography, majoring in social and political geography, and graduated in 1949. He earned his master's degree in 1953 and was awarded a Bachelor of Letters (B.Litt.) degree in 1954 for his thesis on human settlements.

== Career ==
=== Academic ===
His teaching began at the Presbyterian College of Education, Akropong. After his tertiary education at the University of Oxford, he returned to the Gold Coast and was appointed lecturer of geography at the University of Ghana, then the University College of the Gold Coast, in 1950.

He became a professor and head of the geography department of the university in 1961. In 1962, he was made dean of the faculty of social studies of the university. While at the university, he was master of the Mensah Sarbah Hall, a hall of residence in the University of Ghana.

In 1969, he was appointed principal of the University College of Cape Coast, and was the first vice chancellor of the institution when it was elevated to university status in 1972 as the University of Cape Coast.

He held many visiting appointments with universities in Britain and America. He was a Smuts visiting fellow at the University of Cambridge in 1965 and 1966. He was also a visiting professor at the University of Pittsburgh, Pennsylvania.

In 1950, he was elected a fellow of the Royal Geographical Society. He was an honorary fellow of the Ghana Institute of Planners in 1984, and was elected a Fellow of the Royal Society of Arts in 1973.

=== Ghana Academy of Arts and Sciences ===
Ernest was a foundation member of the Ghana Academy of Arts and Sciences in 1959. He was the secretary of the academy from 1959 to 1962. He was appointed its president from 1973 to 1976.

=== Public service ===
He served on many national and international committees and represented Ghana in many conferences. He was a member of the UNESCO International Advisory Committee on Humid Tropics Research from 1961 to 1963. He was also a member of the Scientific Council of Africa from 1963 to 1980.

In 1961, he was made a member of the National Planning Commission of Ghana, serving in this capacity for three years. He was a member of the Council for Scientific and Industrial Research – Ghana from 1967 to 1975. He served as director of the Ghana National Atlas Project from 1965 to 1977. In 1967, he was a member of the Ghana delegation at the United Nations Conference on Geographical Names, hosted in Geneva. He was appointed chairman of the Geographical Committee for the 1970 population census.

In 1973, he was appointed the first chairman of the Environmental Protection Council of Ghana, serving in that capacity until 1978. He served on the National Economic Planning Council of Ghana as a member from 1974 to 1978, and in 1995, he was appointed vice chairman of the council. He was a member of the Ghana delegation to the United Nations General Assembly in New York City in 1976. That same year, he was the alternate leader of the Ghana Delegation to the United Nations Conference in Vancouver. He was appointed chairman of the Land Use Planning Committee of Ghana from 1978 to 1979.

In 1979, he was appointed president of the Governing Council of UNEP and served as a senior consultant of the council from 1989 to 1992. From 1978 to 1979, he was a member of the Constituent Assembly responsible for drafting the constitution for the third Republic of Ghana. In 1980, he was a member of the Presidential Task Force on Investments of Ghana and the National Council for Higher Education from 1975 to 1983. He was appointed chairman of the West African Examinations Council in 1977 and served in that capacity until 1985. He served as president of the Ghana Wildlife Society from 1974 to 1987.

== Publications ==
He authored and contributed to many books and pamphlets. He also contributed articles in geographical and other journals and reference works. He was a contributor for Encyclopædia Britannica for almost twenty years. Some of his works include:

- Tomorrow's Map of West Africa, 1952
- A geographical study of human settlement in the eastern province of the gold coast colony west of the volta delta, 1954
- A Geography of Ghana, 1959 (contribution)
- Developing Countries of the World, 1968 (contribution)
- Population Growth and Economic Development in Africa, 1972
- Independence and Nation Building in Africa, 1973
- A political geography of Africa (Cambridge University Press, 1978)
- African Unity: the dream and the reality (J. B. Danquah Memorial Lectures 1978), 1979
- Physical and Social Geography (in Africa South of the Sahara 1994)
- Crisis, Change and Revolution in Ghanaian Education (Armstrong-Amissah Memorial Lecture), 1996
- Government and the People: outlook for democracy in Ghana, 1996

== Honours ==
While at the University of Oxford, Boateng was awarded the Henry Oliver Beckit Memorial Prize for geography.

He was awarded an honorary Doctor of Letters degree.

In 1978, he was a recipient of the National Book Award, Ghana.

== Personal life ==
He married Evelyn Kensema Danso in 1955. She is the daughter of the late Reverend Robert Opong Danso and Victoria Danso, both of Aburi. Together, they had four daughters.

He was the brother of Josiah Ofori Boateng, a former justice of the Supreme Court of Ghana.

== Death ==
Boateng died on 15 July 1997, after a short illness. He was buried in his hometown, Aburi.
