= John Debra Sapong =

Ghanaian judge and author (born 1929)

Justice John Debra Sapong

Supreme Court Judge
- In office 15 April 1999 – 2 June 2000
- Appointed by: Jerry John Rawlings

Personal details
- Born: December 1929 (age 96) Gold Coast

John Debra Sapong (born December 1929) was a Ghanaian judge and barrister. He served as a Justice of the Supreme Court of Ghana from 1999 to 2000.

== Biography ==
Sapong was born December 1929 in the Gold Coast. He was called to the bar at Lincoln's Inn. He began his judicial career as a District Magistrate in Accra. He later became a Circuit Court judge stationed in Koforidua in the 1970s. He rose through the ranks through the Appeal Court to become a Supreme Court Judge in 1999. He was nominated in 1999 and vetted on 10 March that year together with Josiah Ofori Boateng. He was approved by parliament on 30 March 1999 and was sworn in on 15 April 1999. He retired on 2 June 2000.

== See also ==
- List of judges of the Supreme Court of Ghana
- Supreme Court of Ghana
