= Aburi Botanical Gardens =

Garden in Aburi, Ghana

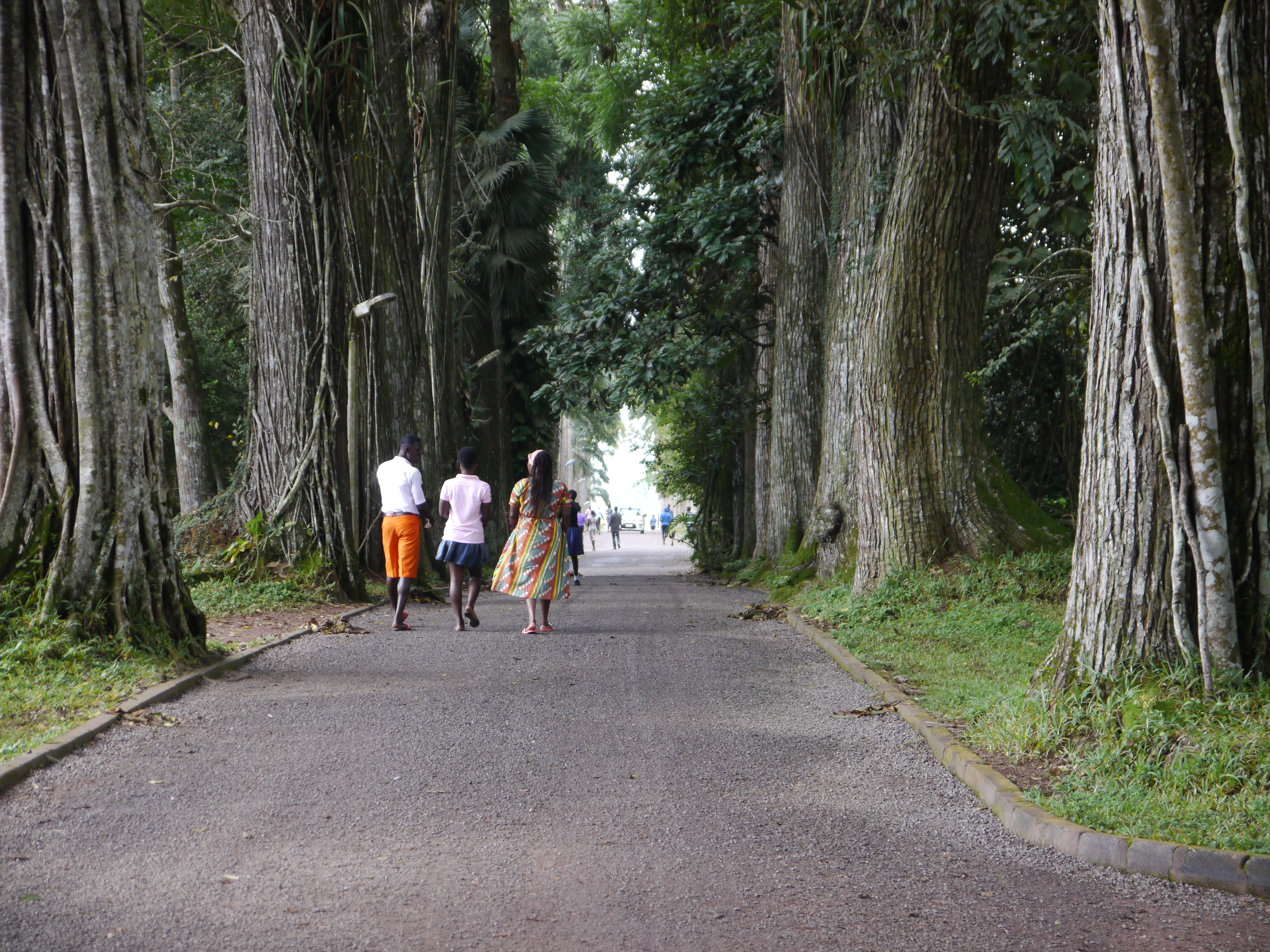
- Walkway in Aburi Botanical Gardens
- Interactive map of Aburi Botanical Gardens
- Type: Botanical Garden
- Location: Aburi, Eastern Region
- Coordinates: 5°51′13″N 0°10′33″W
- Area: 64.8 hectares (160 acres)
- Created: March 1890

Aburi Botanical Gardens is a garden in Aburi in the Eastern Region of Ghana.

Today, in the 21st century, one cannot talk about horticulture in Ghana and West Africa without talking about the Aburi Botanical Gardens. The Garden occupies an area of 64.8 hectares. It was opened in March 1890 and was founded by Governor William Brandford-Griffith and Dr. John Farrell Easmon, a Sierra Leonean medical doctor. Before the garden was established, it was the site of a sanatorium built in 1875 for Gold Coast government officials. During the governorship of William Brandford-Griffith, a Basel missionary and Jamaican Moravian, Alexander Worthy Clerk, supervised the clearing of land around the sanatorium to start the Botanic Department. In 1890 William Crowther, a student from the Royal Botanic Gardens, Kew, was appointed the garden's first curator. The gardens played an important role in encouraging cocoa production in South Ghana, by supplying cheap cocoa seedlings and information about scientific farming methods. After Hevea brasiliensis was sent to Aburi from Kew in 1893, the gardens also encouraged rubber production in Ghana.

In May 2019, the chief of Aburi, Otoobour Djan Kwasi II, called for the privatization of the Aburi Botanical Gardens. He was of the view that it was going to be an opportunity to invite investment to the tourist facility. He said the private investment could revitalize the Gardens and enhance its tourism potential to improve business in the area.

Aburi Botanic Garden has had many roles over the years including plant introduction and teaching scientific methods of agriculture but today is one of the many institutions leading the fight to save plant diversity through research, growing endangered plants, plant multiplication, horticultural training, and environmental education.

== Tree species found in the garden ==
One can find in the garden tree species such as silk cotton (ceiba pentandra), mahogany, cedar, silver oak, and many more.

In view of its geographical position on the mountain with various tropical tree species and botanical gardens, the town, especially the gardens known as the Aburi Botanical Gardens, has become a haven for both foreign and local tourists.

== Gallery ==
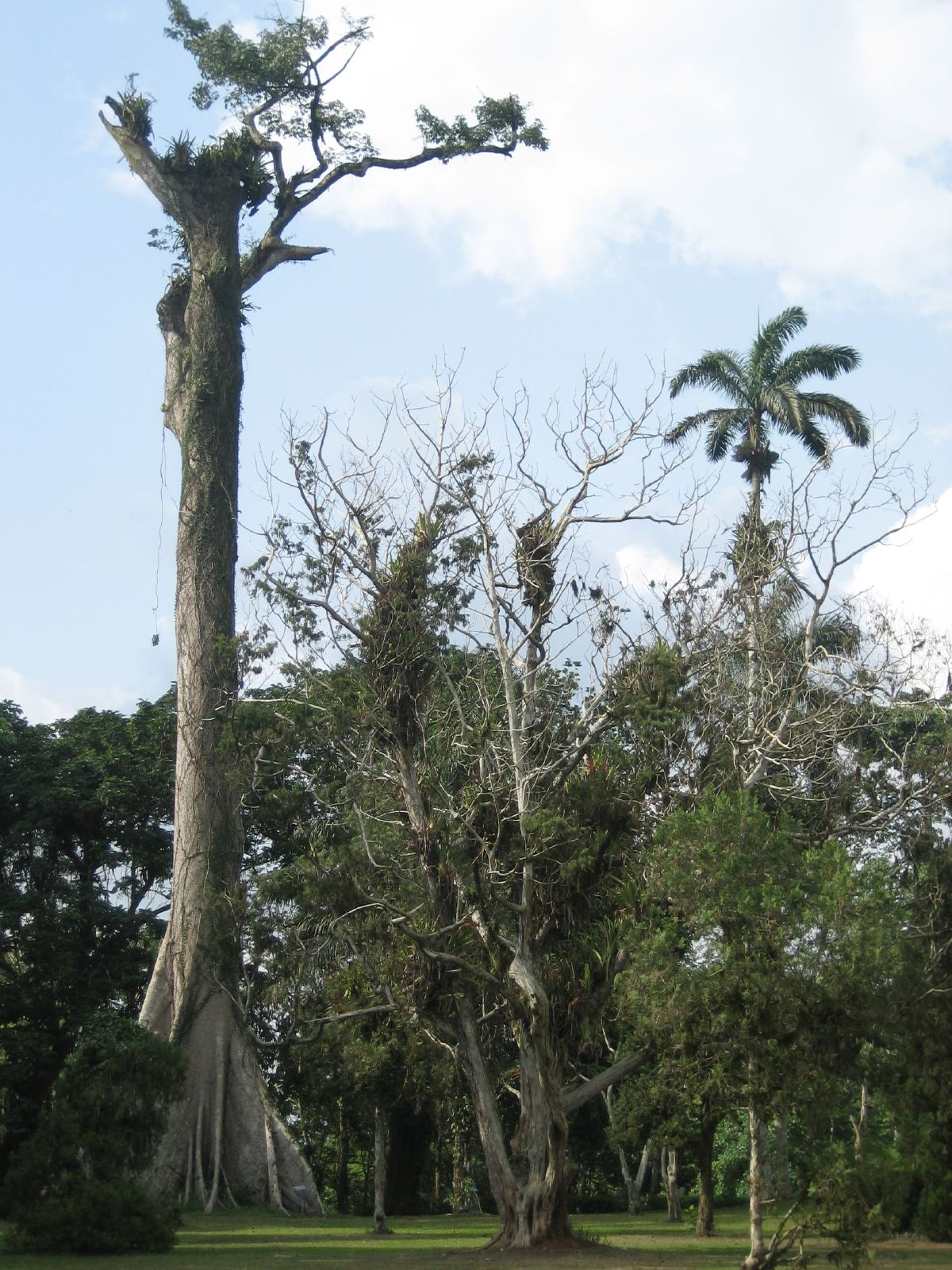

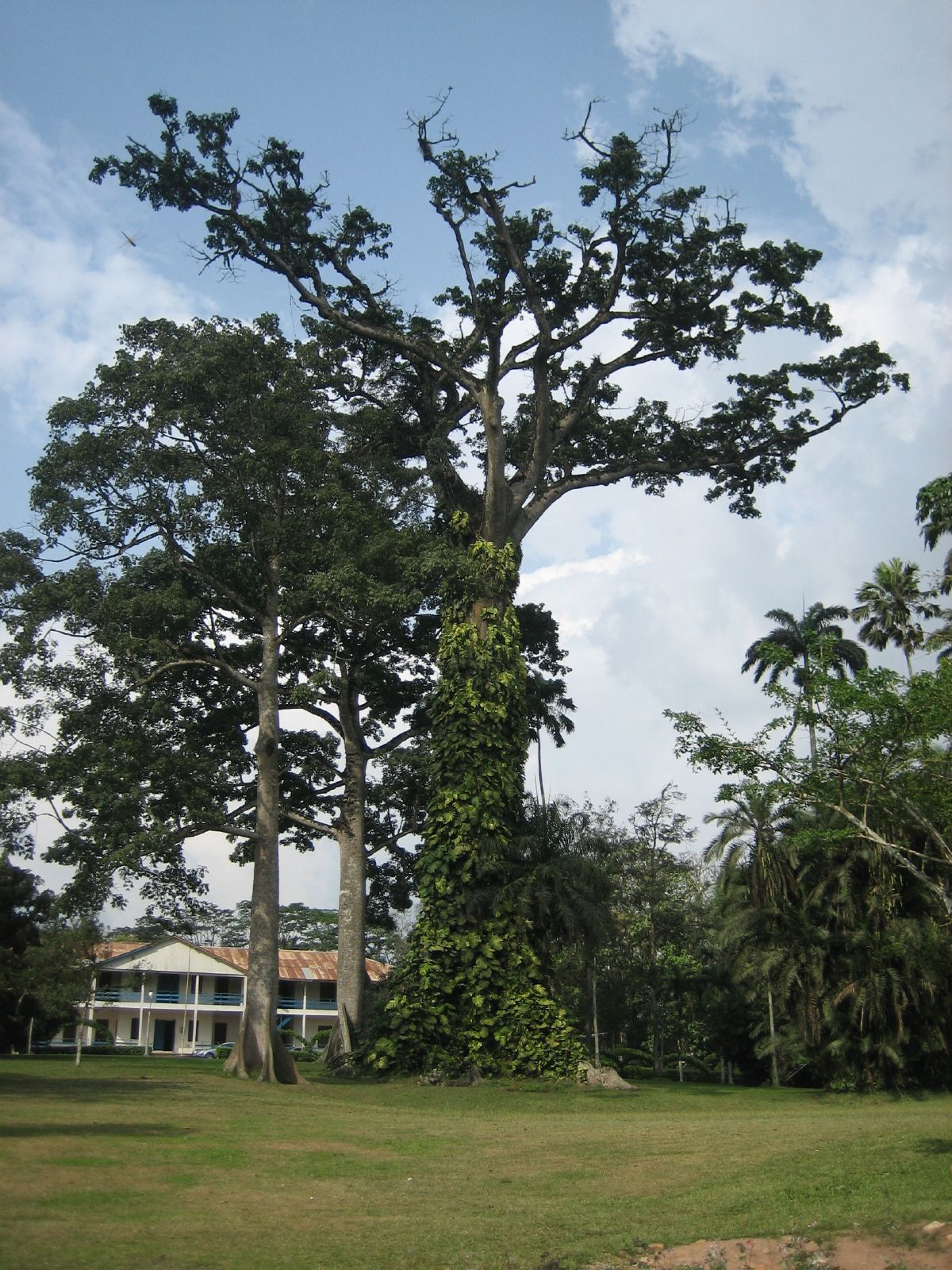

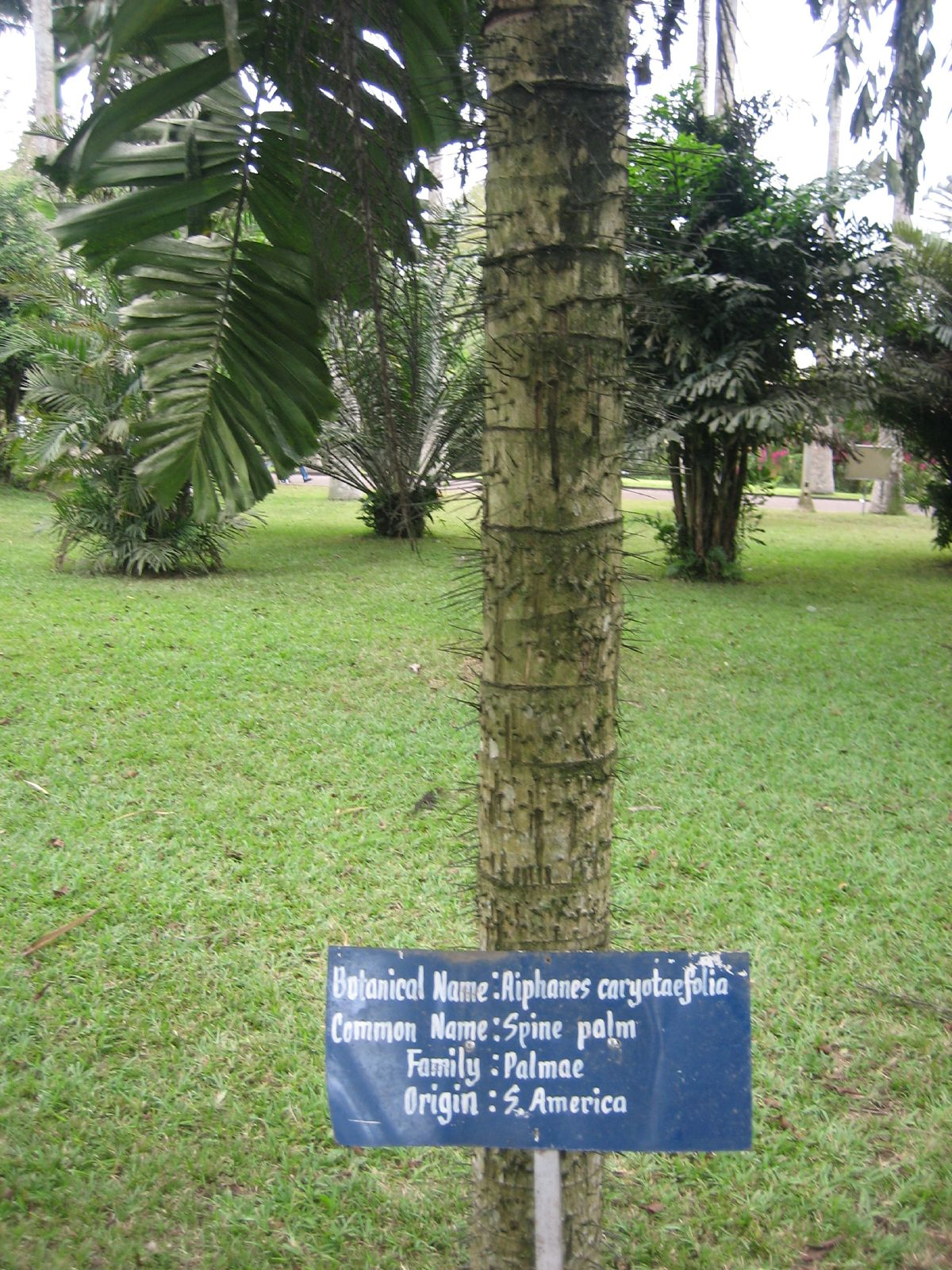
Spine palm (Aiphanes horrida, Synonym Aiphanes cyryotaefolia)

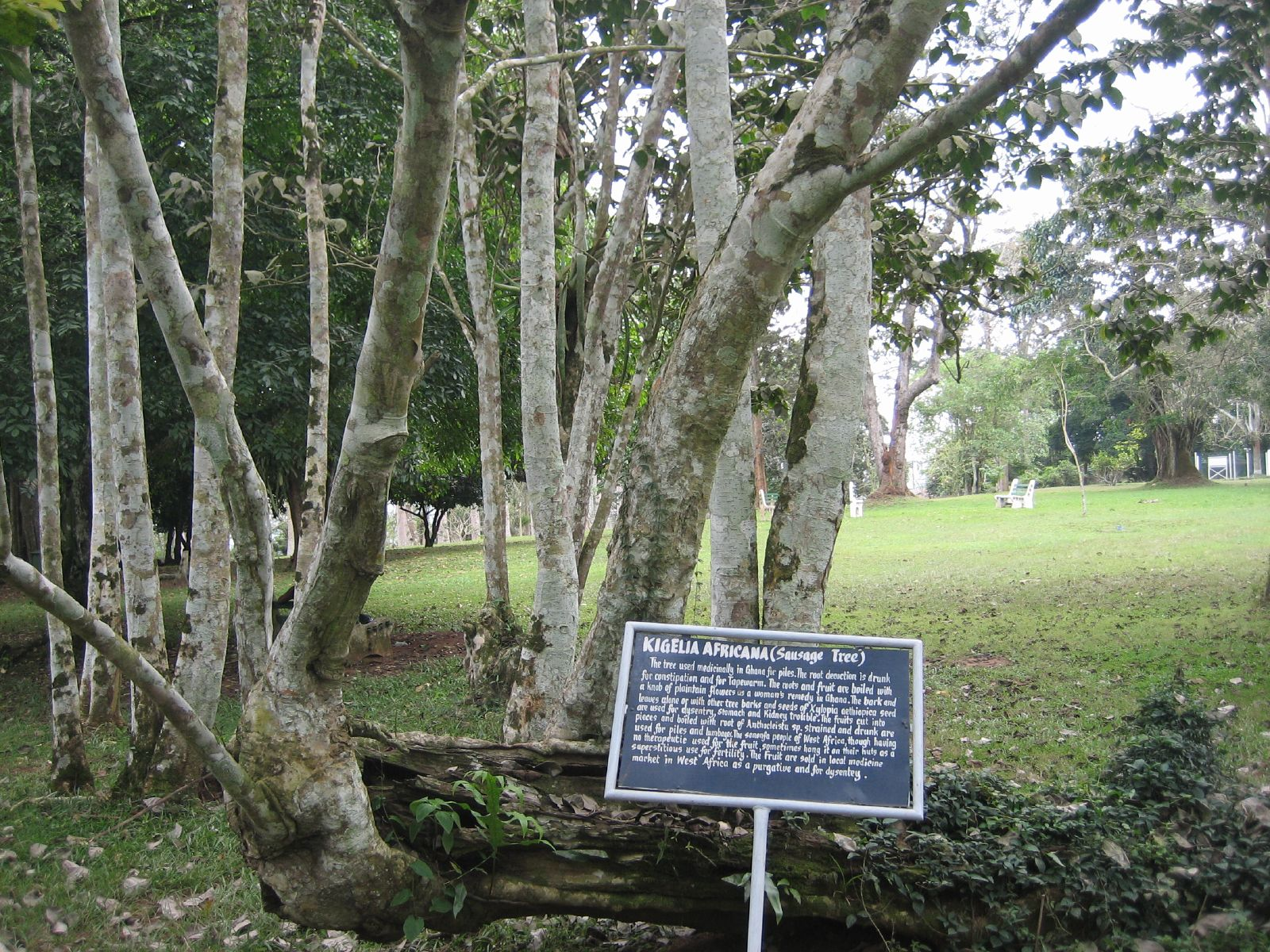
Kigelia (sausage tree)

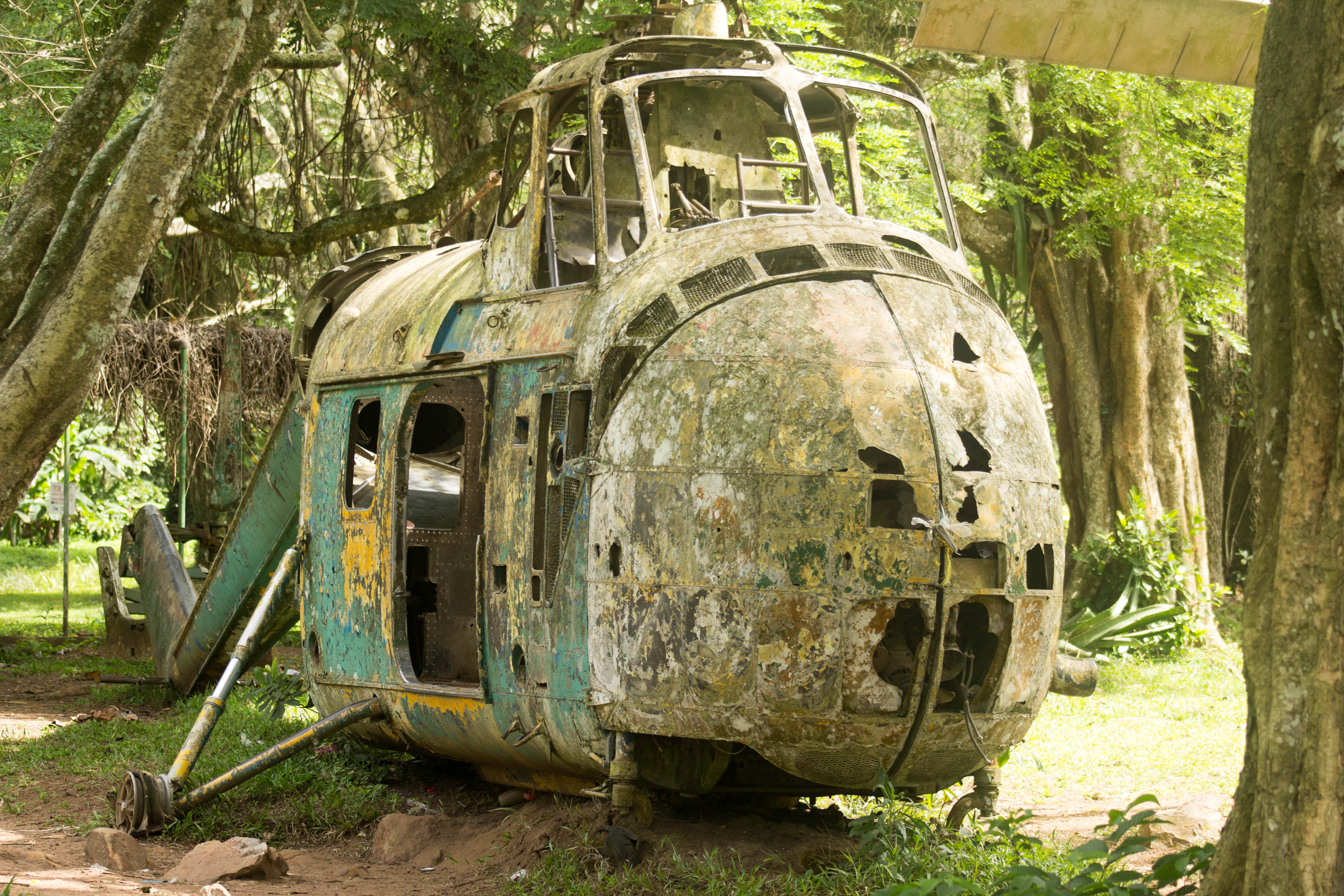

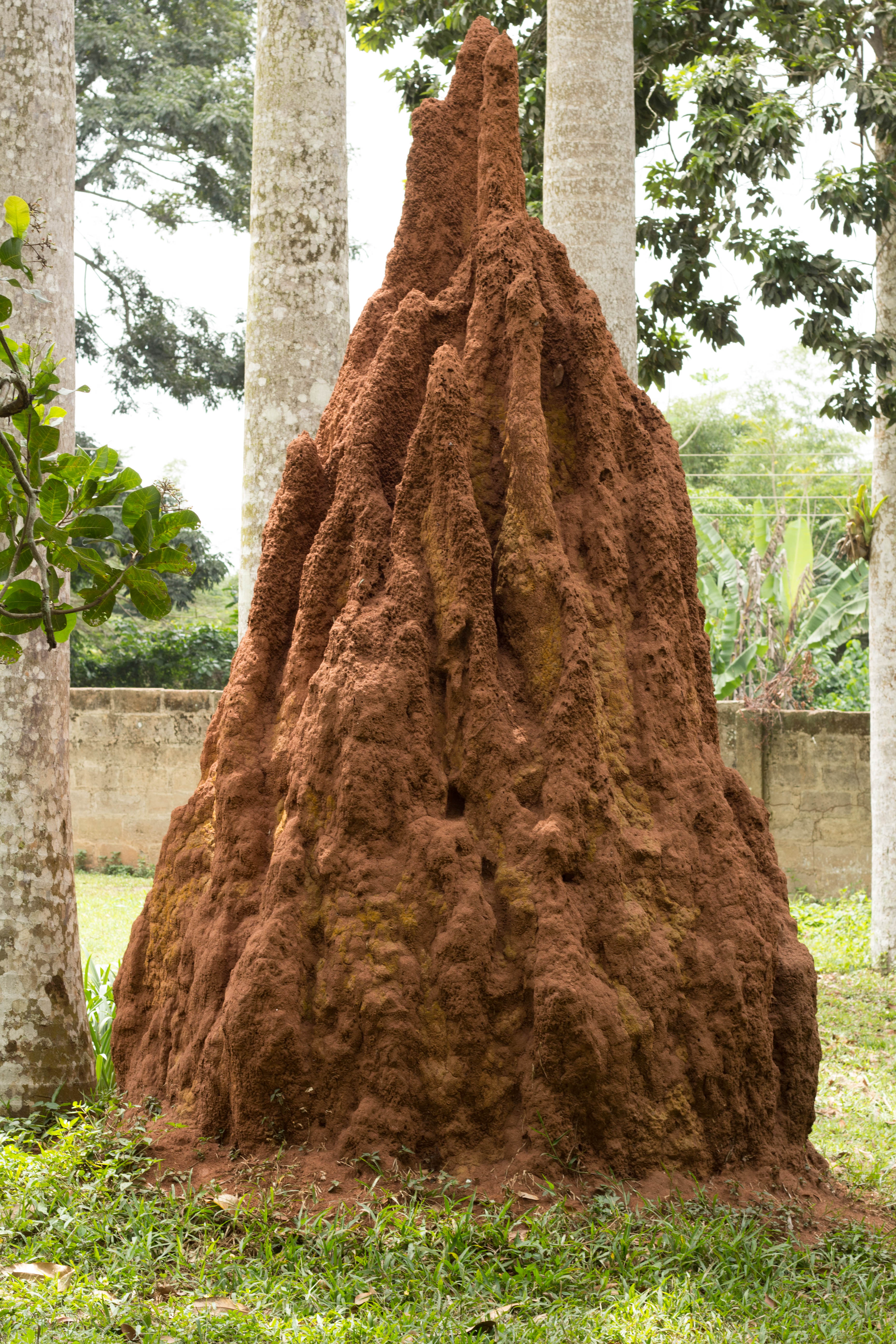
Anthill

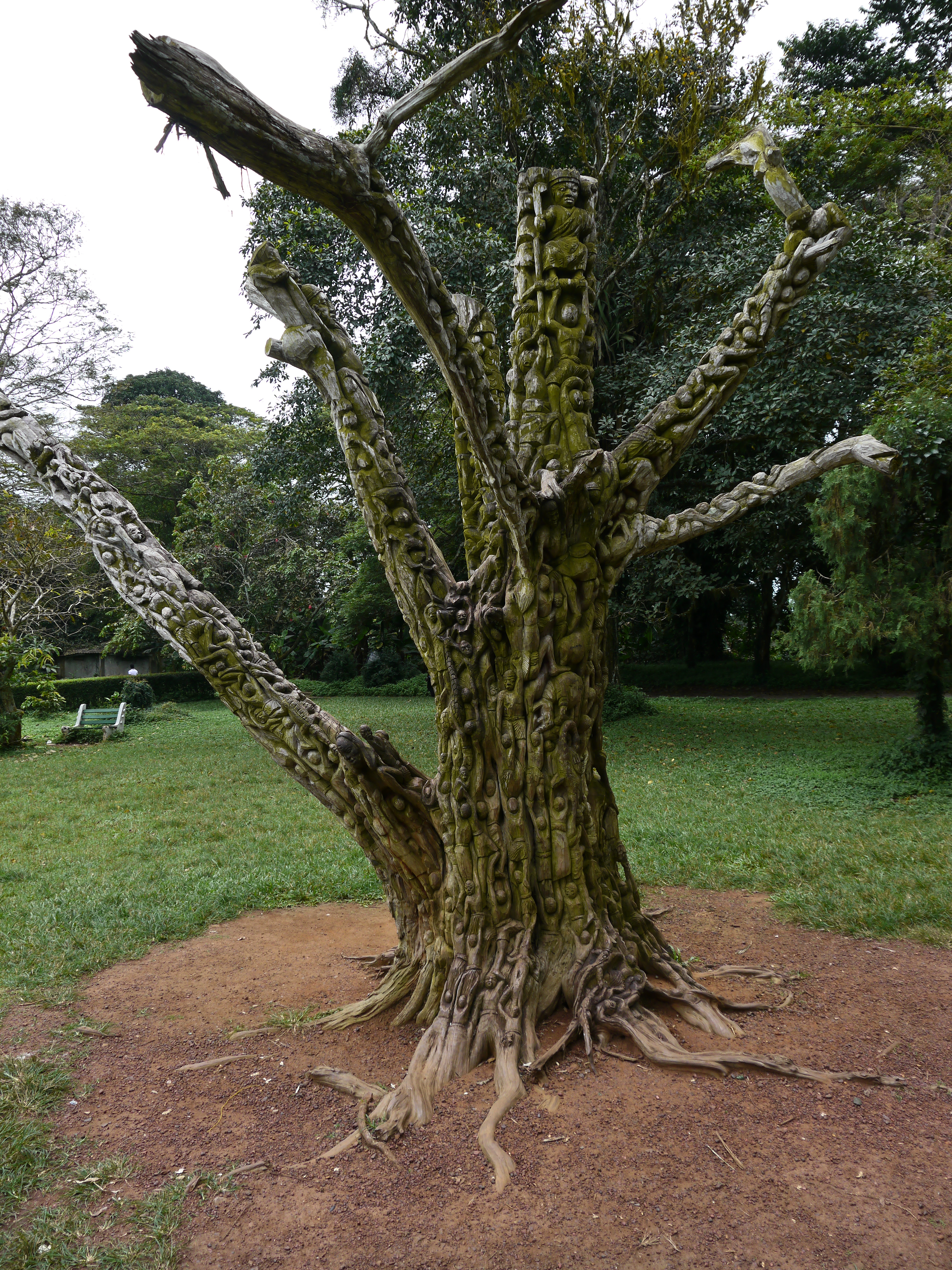
Remains of a dead tree carved into a sculpture
