= Aburi =

Town in Eastern Region, Ghana

- Town
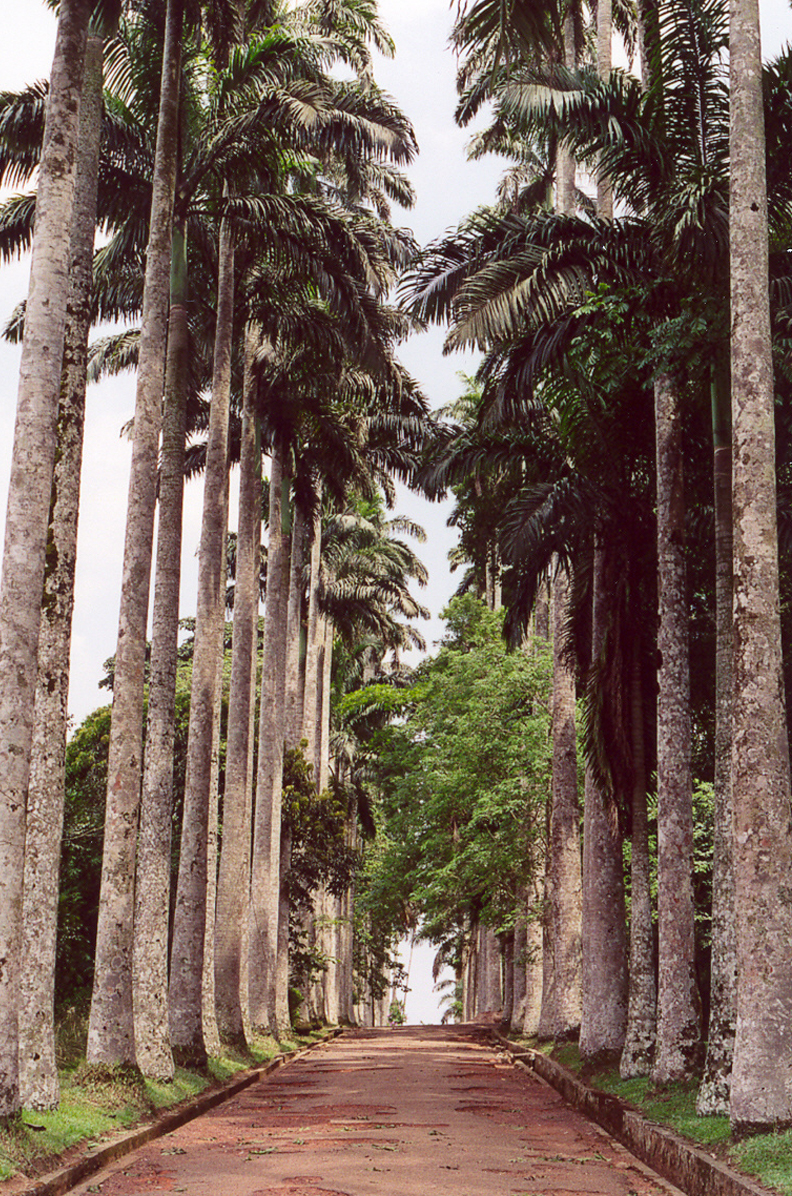
- Aburi Botanical Gardens and Palm Trees in Aburi

- Location within Ghana
- Coordinates: 5°51′N 0°11′W
- Country: Ghana
- Region: Eastern Region
- District: Akuapim South Municipal

Population (2013)
  - Total: 18,701
- Time zone: UTC+0 (GMT)

Aburi is a town in the Akuapem South Municipal District of the Eastern Region of South Ghana famous for the Aburi Botanical Gardens and the Odwira Festival . Aburi has a population of 18,701 as of 2013.

== Transport ==
=== Road ===
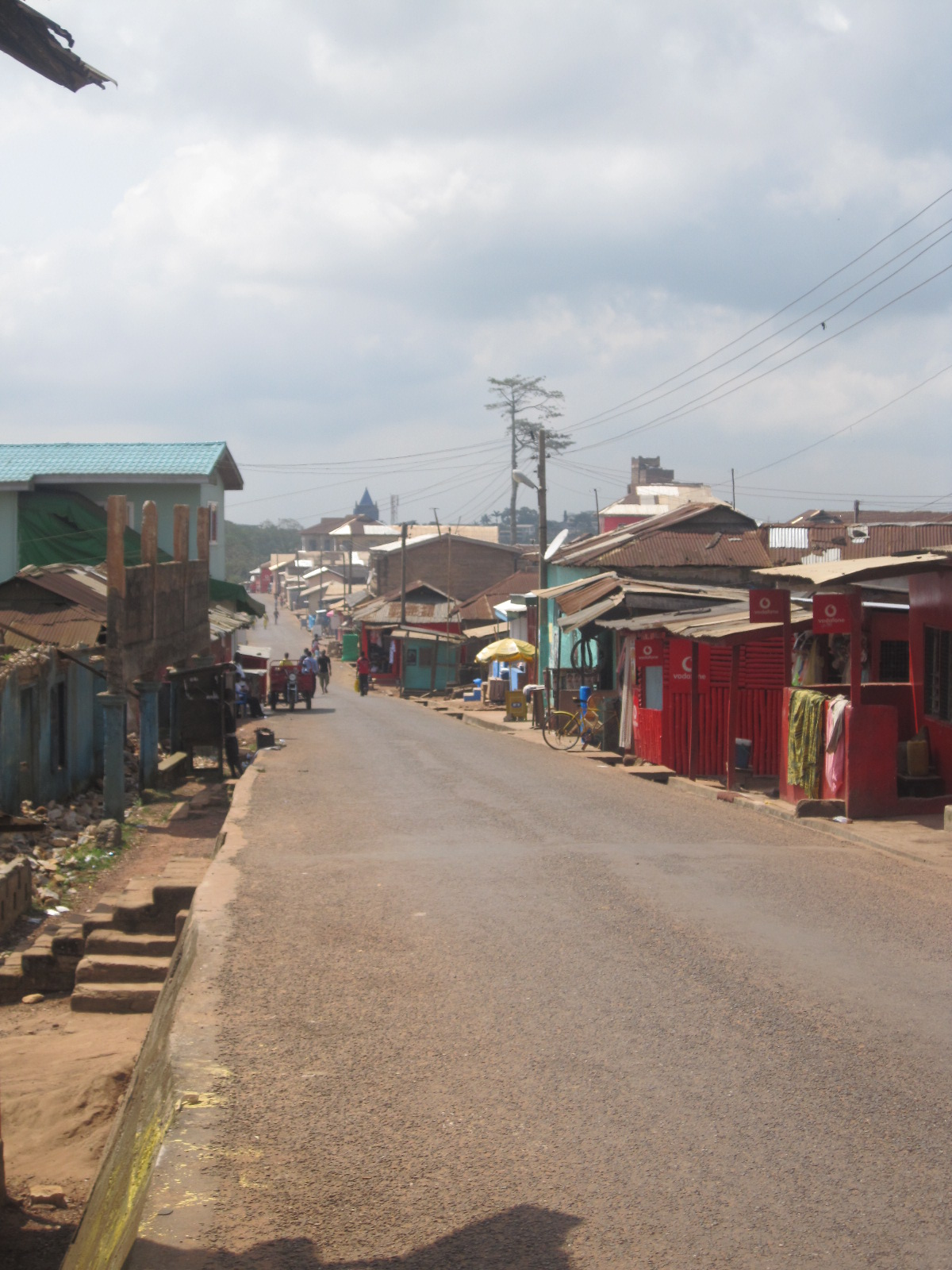
A street in the town of Aburi

Aburi is North East of Accra, and the journey from Accra to Aburi is about 45 minutes (it became less when the dual carriage road from Tetteh Quarshie Circle to Adenta Barrier was completed by 2014).

Due to the altitude of Aburi, the climate is a lot cooler than neighbouring Accra. The road which climbs the hillside to Aburi is a toll road, with the current toll being 0.50 Ghc for a car, 1.00 Ghc for a 4x4.

There is a higher charge for vans and lorries. From the road most of Greater Accra is visible below, although the one stopping space for pictures on this section of road has a "No Stopping" sign.

== Education ==
Aburi has several primary education, secondary education, higher education and further education institutions and Aburi is home to Aburi Presbyterian Technical Secondary School, which is linked to The Sixth Form College, Farnborough in Hampshire, England. Aburi is also home to Aburi Girls' Senior High School started by the Presbyterian church. Aburi also hosts the Great Adonten Senior High School. For post secondary education, you can find the Presbyterian Women's College of Education, formerly known as PWTC Training college.

== History and economy ==
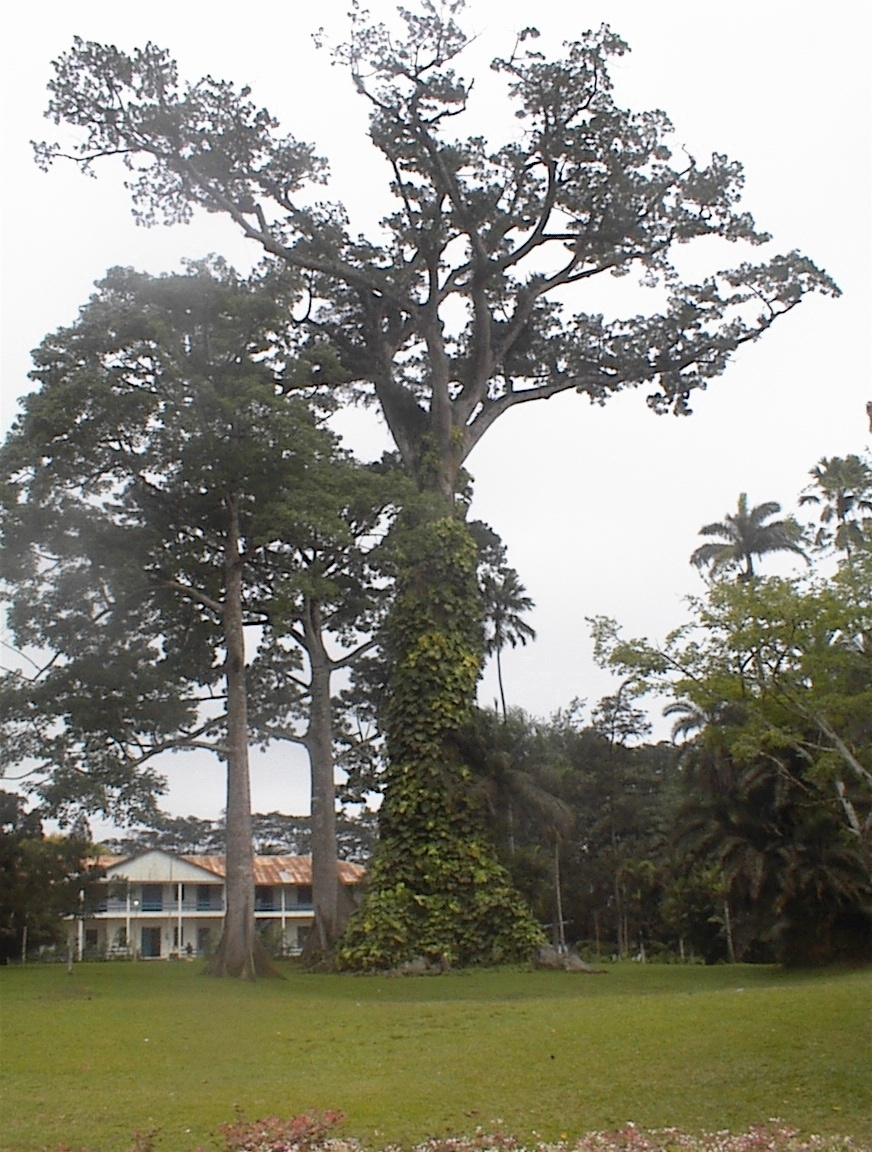
Aburi Botanical Gardens

The name Aburi is the adulterated version of ABUDE by the European missionaries and traders. Because of Aburi's location in the mountains of Ghana and its proximity to the coast of Ghana, an agricultural research farm was set up near Aburi by British residents in 1891. The area of the garden originally consisted of 20 hectares, in 1901 there were 17.8 hectares and in 1902 came to more than 40 hectares of new acquisitions, which was discovered during the last expansion with considerable resistance. Ultimately, the expansion could take place only through the application of governmental authority over state expropriation. The purpose of the Botanical Garden was originally to test field-building opportunities and to develop, which contributes to greater financial independence of Ghana. The focus of the garden was primarily in culture experiments with indigenous crops such as cocoa, rubber plants and cola. In addition, there were also ornamental and fruit plants grown of various kinds and small field trials with cotton and spices, vanilla and pepper mainly on cardamom and nutmeg. An inventory, dated 21 July 1900, lists 350 different plant species grown in Aburi. In addition, there was in 1903 in the center of the garden, a sanatorium. In 1901 the expenditure was for the garden equivalent of 44,312 marks (then German marks). Especially for the cotton experiments, a cotton planter expert from the United States (Texas) named Edmund Fisher, was employed, and who was, however, unfavorable for cotton in the rain forest, which is located in Aburi, which had only a few small test plots. A larger cotton research station was built on Edmund Fisher's recommendation in the grasslands by the Volta River built, and grown where cotton is the native culture from time immemorial and the cotton were made into clothing. It is not only an experimental farm that was established, but also tries to cheer up the locals to expand their cotton production. The latter was accomplished mainly through the distribution of seeds to the chiefs in connection with a purchase guarantee for all cotton harvested in a central market in buying at (9 ' N, 0 ° 6 ' O) on the Volta, where the cotton could be accommodated easily by water. In the Volta River could then also be the removal of the cotton. The most distant of the cotton growing area in Eastern region, is the landscape area which is about 13–15 km from the Volta River. It has also been used for treatment of raw cotton and where the Ginstation was built.^{[a]}

Today, on the grounds of the only botanical garden in Aburi, Ghana, is mainly home to many plants that were not originally native to Eastern region, but there is a collection of tropical plants that have been added.

== Tourism ==
Aburi is home to a wood market. Goods manufactured at the Aburi markets are rumored to have found their way to South Africa to be sold on to tourists.

Aburi Botanical Gardens is a Ghanaian tourist destination.

== Health ==
- Kom Presbyterian Clinic

== Peduase Lodge ==
Peduase is the location of a Presidential summer residence ('Peduase Lodge') built and first used by Ghana's first President, Kwame Nkrumah. It was used in the second republic of Ghana as the official residence of the then Ceremonial President, Edward Akufo-Addo. Since then it has not been permanently resided in by any Ghanaian head-of-state. Peduase Lodge is still used as a Presidential accommodation for the state of Ghana guests. The Presidential Lodge is in Peduase, a town near Kitase on the road to Aburi.

== Notable personalities ==
Aburi is the birthplace of, or home to, several notable people, including:

- Joyce Bamford-Addo - first female Justice of the Supreme Court of Ghana and first female Speaker of Parliament of the Fourth Republic
- E. A. Boateng - First vice chancellor of the University of Cape Coast
- Josiah Ofori Boateng - Retired Justice of the Supreme Court of Ghana
- Alexander Worthy Clerk - Jamaican Moravian missionary and educator to the Gold Coast
- Nicholas Timothy Clerk - Gold Coast theologian, missionary and minister, first Synod Clerk, Presbyterian Church of the Gold Coast
- Carl Henry Clerk - Ghanaian educator, journalist and minister, fourth Synod Clerk, Presbyterian Church of the Gold Coast
- Jane E. Clerk - Gold Coast educator and public education administrator
- Ohene Djan - Ghanaian Sports Administrator
- Samia Nkrumah - Ghanaian politician; daughter of Kwame Nkrumah, Ghana's first leader

== Footnotes ==
^[a] "Ginstation" (derived from English engine ) was a then-common term for a station with a larger system for the automated processing of anything. In most cases, however, was the term for a plant processing of raw cotton meant.

== Gallery ==
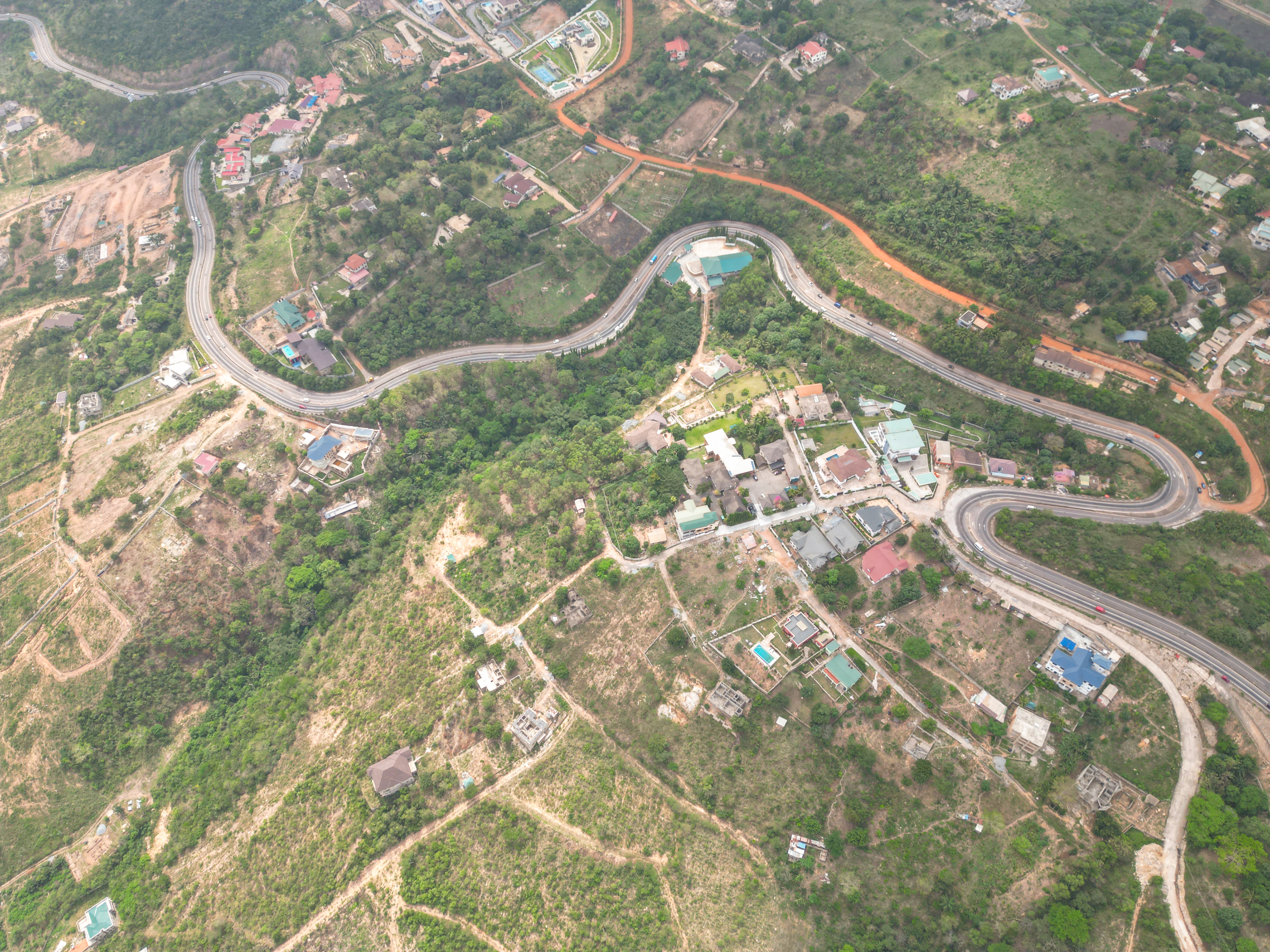
Aburi mountains Highway

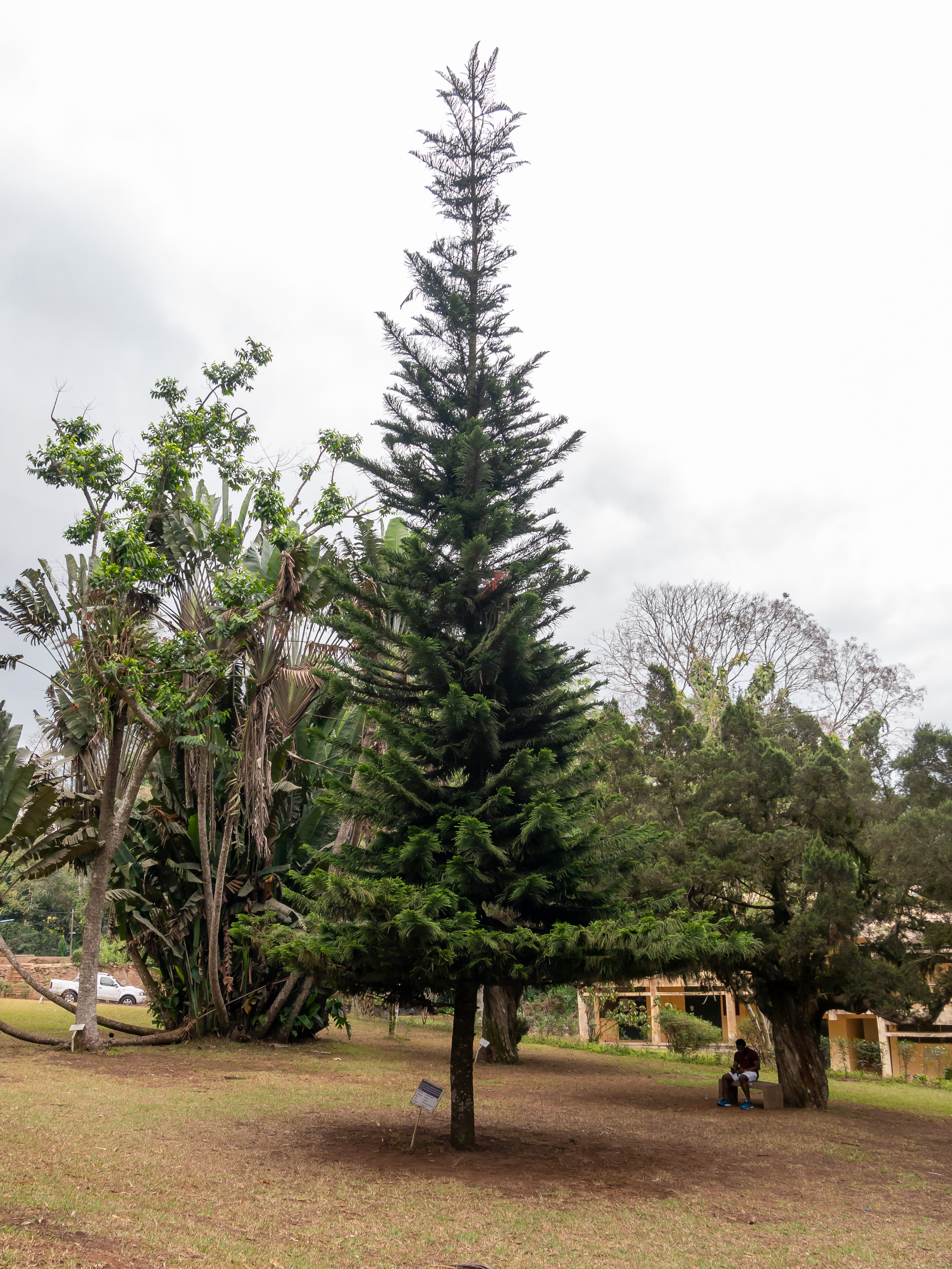
Araucaria columnaris, Aburi

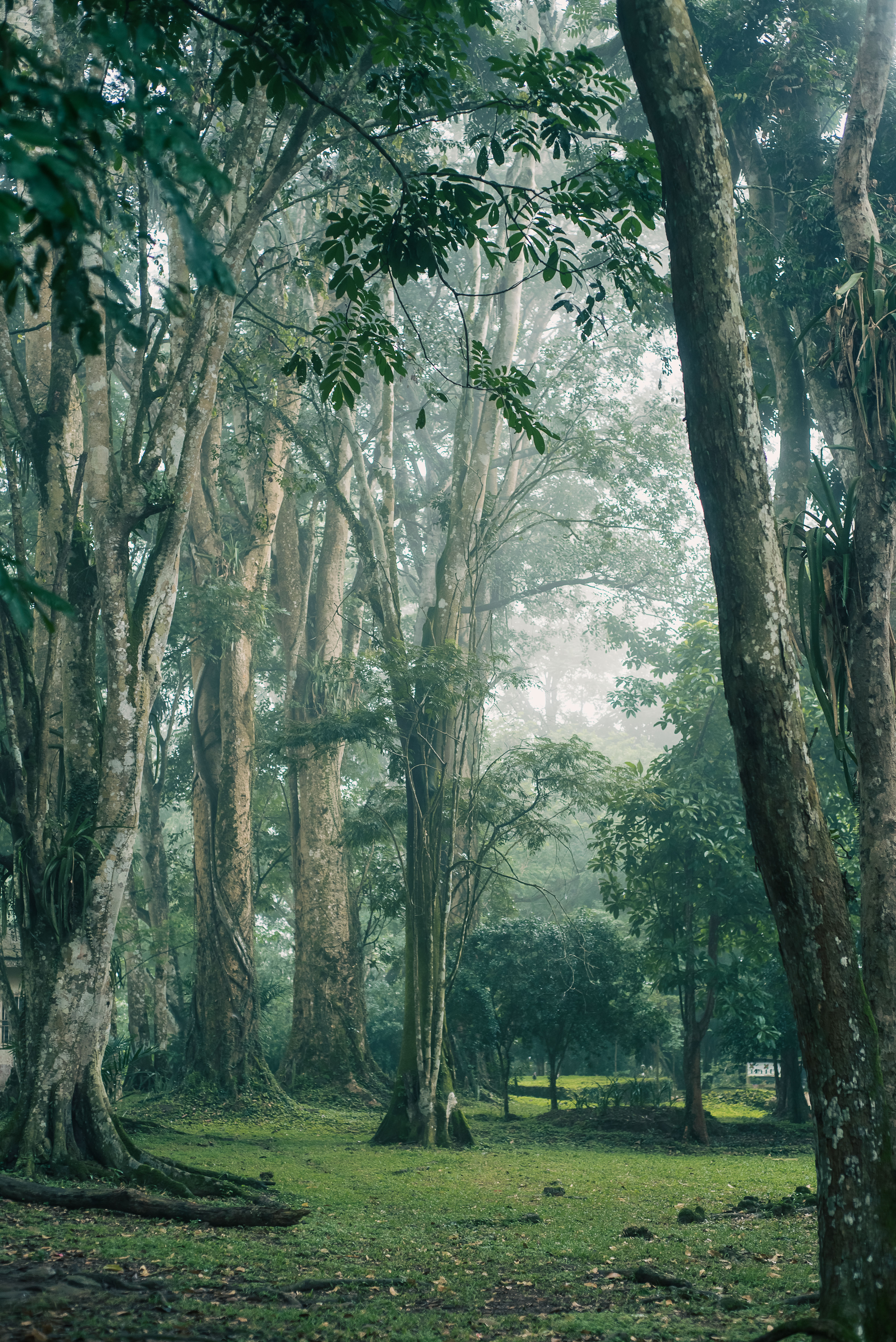
Tree of Hope, Aburi

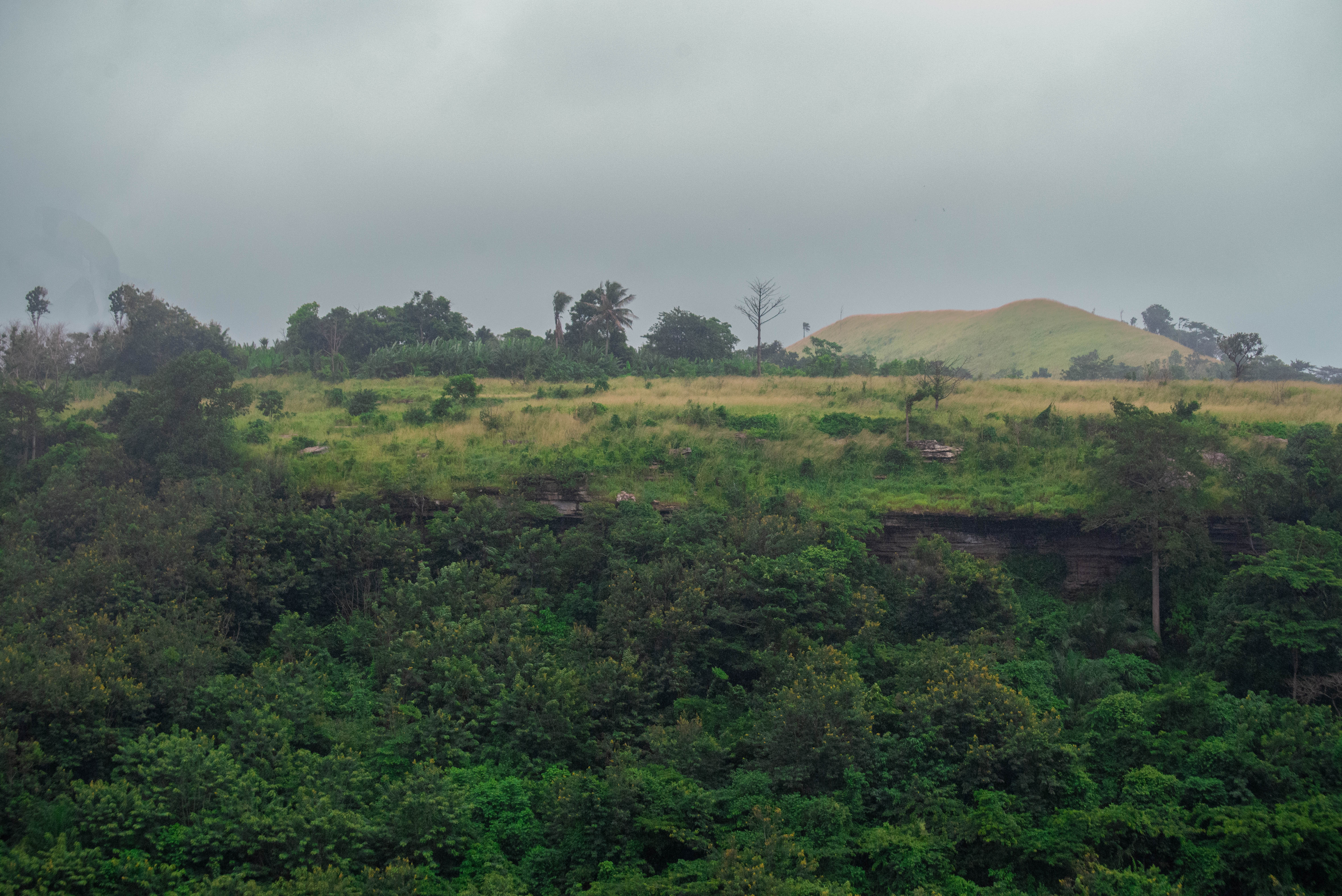
Aburi Mampong Landscape

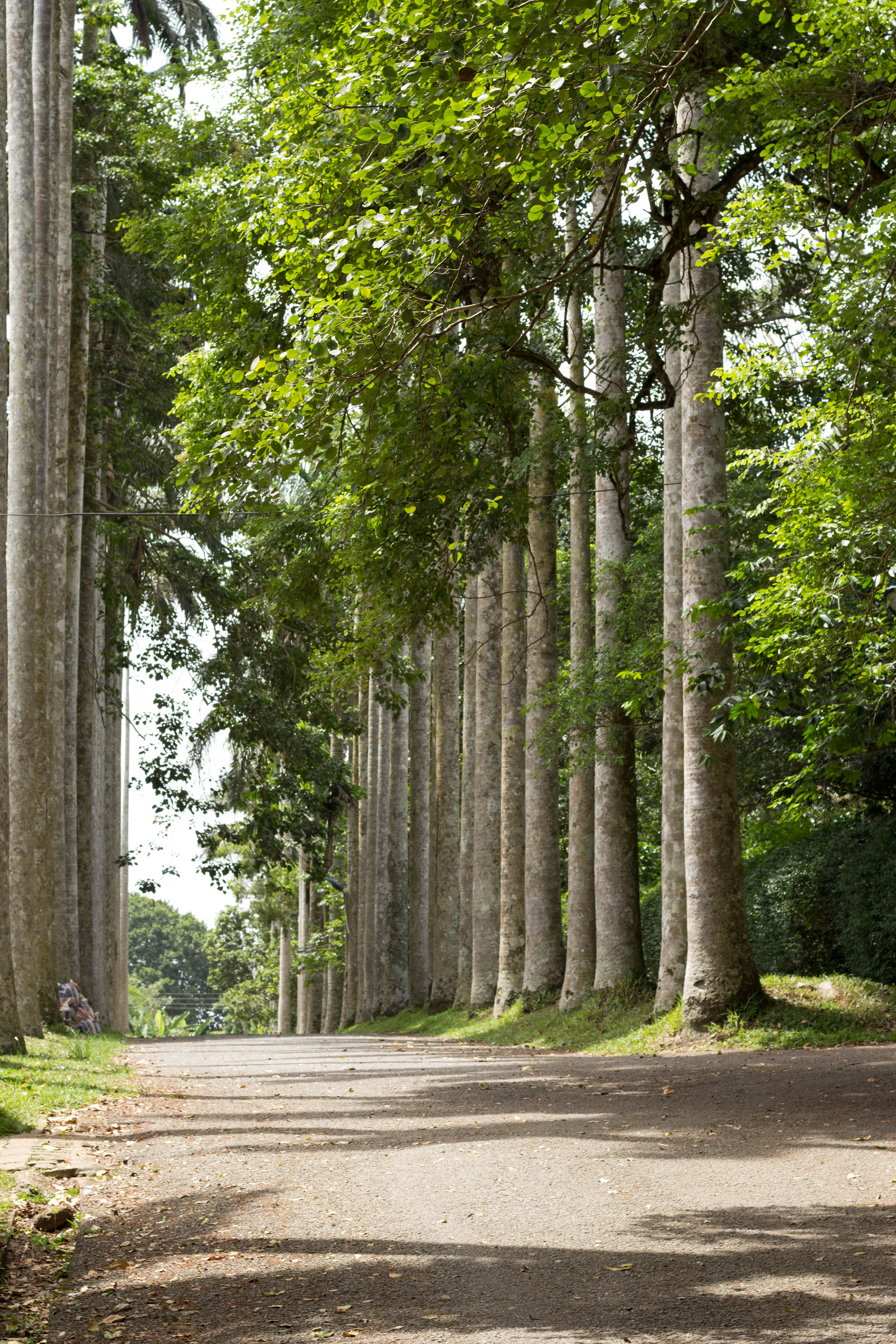
Aburi Gardens

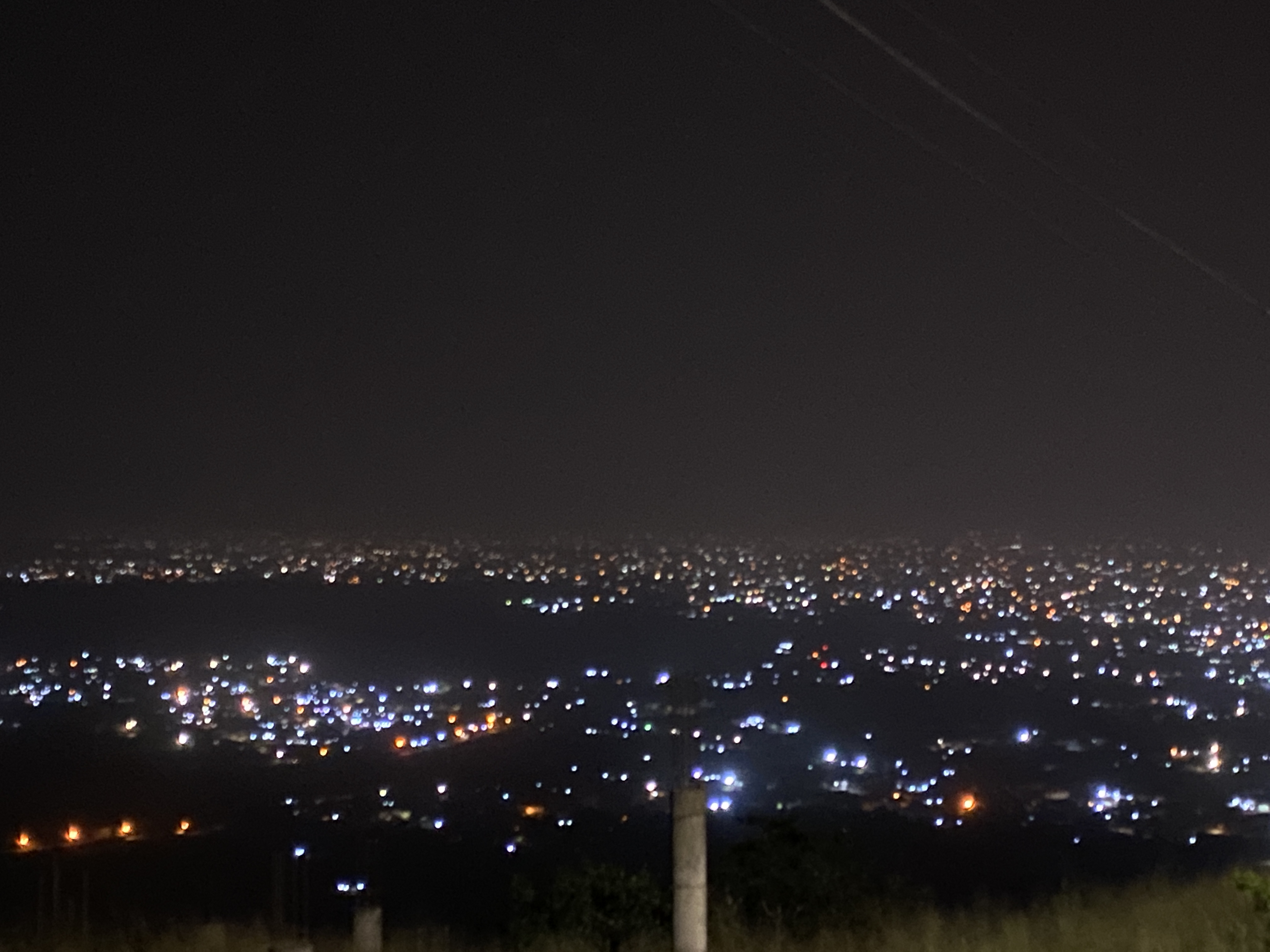
Aburi at night

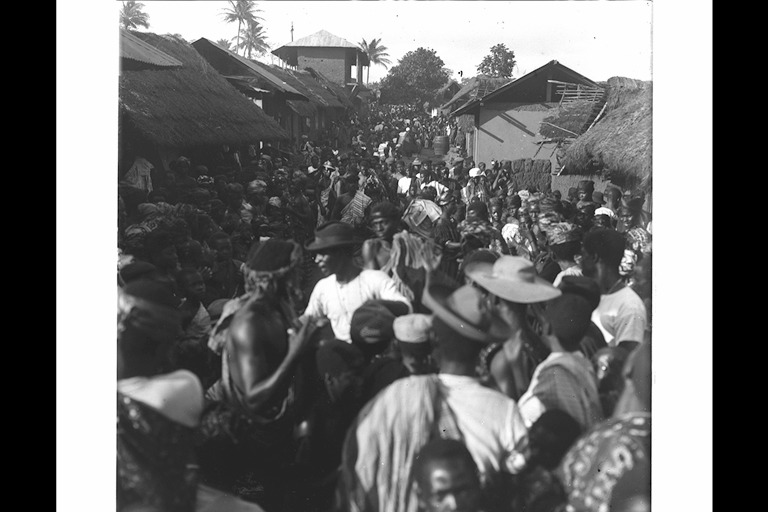
Yam Festival in Aburi
