= Josiah Ofori Boateng =

Ghanaian Supreme Court Judge

His Lordship Josiah Ofori Boateng JSC
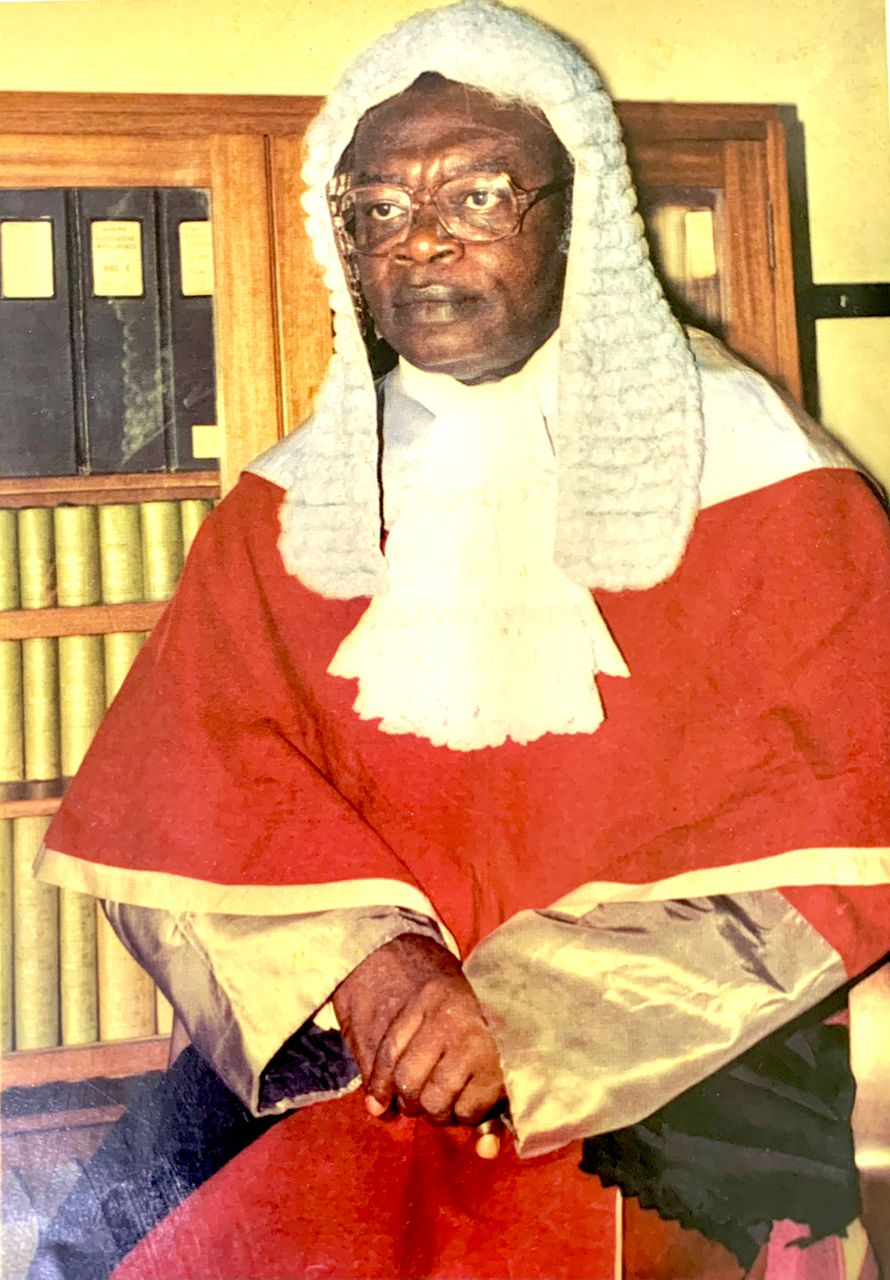
- Josiah Ofori Boateng

Supreme Court Judge
- In office 15 April 1999 – 4 January 2001
- Appointed by: Jerry John Rawlings

Chairman of the Electoral Commission of Ghana
- In office 1992–1993
- Appointed by: Jerry John Rawlings
- Preceded by: Joseph Kingsley-Nyinah
- Succeeded by: Kwadwo Afari-Gyan

Appeal Court Judge
- In office 1989–1992
- Appointed by: Jerry John Rawlings
- In office 1993–1999
- Appointed by: Jerry John Rawlings

Personal details
- Born: Josiah Ofori Boateng; 4 January 1931
- Spouse: Sabina Ofori Boateng
- Relatives: Ernest Amano Boateng (brother)
- Education: Achimota School
- Alma mater: University College of the Gold Coast; University College of London
- Profession: Judge

Josiah Ofori Boateng (4 January 1931 - 20 April 2008) is a Ghanaian judge who served on the Supreme Court of Ghana from 1999 to 2001. He previously served as Chairman of the Interim Electoral Commission of Ghana from 1989 to 1993, and in this role presided over the conduct of the first general elections under Ghana's Fourth Republic.

== Early life and education ==
Ofori Boateng hails from Aburi in the Eastern Region of Ghana. He was born on 4 January 1931, the fourth of six children of Presbyterian minister, Rev. Christian Robert Boateng in the then Gold Coast. He had his secondary education at Achimota School and his tertiary education at the University College of the Gold Coast (now the University of Ghana) and the University College of London where he was awarded his Bachelor of Laws (LLB) degree. He enrolled at Lincoln's Inn and was called to the English bar in 1963. He was later called to the Ghanaian bar in 1965.

== Career ==
Ofori Boateng begun as an Assistant State Attorney at post in Sekondi-Takoradi in 1963, before joining the private law firm of Gaisie, Scheck and Company also in Sekondi-Takoradi as a solicitor and advocate.

Boateng went back into public service in the latter part of 1966 and was appointed a district magistrate. In 1969, Boateng was appointed as deputy judicial secretary. He was deputy judicial secretary until his appointment as Director of Research of the Law Reform Commission in 1973. A year later, he obtained a year-long Ford Foundation grant as a visiting scholar at Harvard Law School and the Environmental Institute in Washington. On completion of this, he returned to his work with the Law Reform Commission until 1976.

In 1976, he took up an appointment in Nairobi, Kenya as Senior Programme Officer in the Environmental Law Unit of the United Nations Environmental Programme. He served in this capacity until 1981. That year, Boateng returned to Ghana and was made the Director of Legal Education (head of Ghana School of Law).

Boateng was appointed and sworn in as a Justice of the Court of Appeal in September 1989.

In March 1992, Boateng was appointed Chairman of the Electoral Commission of Ghana with Kwadwo Afari-Gyan as his deputy. As chair of the commission, Boateng supervised a referendum on a new constitution and also the conduct of the 1992 general election and declared the results of the election. He chaired the commission until 1993 when he returned to the Court of Appeal.

In 1999, he was nominated to join the Supreme Court bench together with Justice John Debra Sapong. He was vetted and approved by parliament on 30 March 1999. He together with Justice Sapong were sworn into office as judges of the Supreme Court on 15 April 1999. He remained a Supreme Court judge until his retirement on 4 January 2001. Ofori Boateng has published a number of papers on Law and Environmental issues.

Ofori Boateng was a member of the Ghana Bar Association, an honorary member of the International Bar Association, a chairman of the Council for Law Reporting, and a member of the International Juridical Organisation.

== Personal life ==
Ofori Boateng was married to Sabina Ofori Boateng, a lawyer who was a member of the Constitutional Review Commission. In his spare time, he likes to listen to classical music, work on his poultry farm and write on legal subjects. He is the brother of Ernest Amano Boateng, the first Vice Chancellor of the University of Cape Coast.

== See also ==
- List of judges of the Supreme Court of Ghana
- Supreme Court of Ghana

Preceded by Joseph Kingsley-Nyinah	Electoral Commissioner of Ghana; 1992–1993	Succeeded by Kwadwo Afari-Gyan
