= Ministry of Environment, Science, Technology and Innovation =

Agency overview
- Formed: 1993
- Jurisdiction: Government of Ghana
- Headquarters: Accra, Ghana
- Minister responsible: Zanetor Agyeman-Rawlings

== Vision ==
The ministry conceives of maintaining development through the use of science, technology and innovation for economic growth and healthy external conditions through advanced and a well-structured economy.

== Mission ==
The purpose of this ministry is to sustain growth by putting up measures to strengthen market aimed research and development (R&D) for appropriate external conditions, science, technology and innovation through massive cognizance conception, partnership and team work.

HISTORY OF THE MINISTRY OF ENVIRONMENT,SCIENCE,TECHNOLOGY AND INNOVATION(MESTI)

The Ministry of Environment, Science, Technology and Innovation (MESTI) in Ghana was established in 1994 to integrate environmental sustainability, scientific advancement, and technological innovation into national development. Over the decades, MESTI has undergone significant institutional restructuring, reflecting the evolving priorities of the Ghanaian government.

It is located at Ministries, Accra, Greater Accra, Ghana

Postal Address: P.O.Box M232, Accra, Ghana

Digital Address: GA-107-3073

Phone Numbers: +233 302-662626| +233 030-963659

Key Milestones and Restructuring

1994 (Establishment): MESTI was originally created in response to Agenda 21, the global sustainable development action plan that emerged from the 1992 Earth Summit in Rio de Janeiro.

Early Reorganization: The technology portfolio was temporarily moved to the Ministry of Communications, and the agency was subsequently reconstituted as the Ministry of Environment and Science (MES).

2009 (Re-establishment): Under Executive Instrument (E.I.) 7, the government recognized the need for a unified policy framework. The sectors were consolidated once again into the ministry of Environment, Science and Technology(MEST).

2013 to Present: The Ministry was officially renamed to the Ministry of Environment, Science, Technology and Innovation (MESTI) under Executive Instrument 1 to better reflect the nation's.

HEADS OF THE MINISTRY SINCE INDEPENDENCE

NAME	YEAR IN	YEAR OUT	DEPUTY	POLITICAL PARTY	MINISTRY
Christiana Amoako-Nuama	1994	2001	Info unavailable	NDC	Ministry of Environment, science and Technology
Prof. Kasim Kasanga	2001	2006	Info unavailabe	NPP	Ministry of Environment,Science and Technology
Christine Churcher	2006	2009	info unavailable	NPP	Ministry of Environment, Science and Technology
Sherry Ayittey	2009	2013	info unavailabe	NDC	MEST
Mahama Ayariga	2013	2015	Abu-Bakar Saddique Boniface	NDC	MESTI
Akwasi Oppong-Fosu	2015	2017	Abu-Bakar Saddique Boniface	NDC	MESTI
Prof. Kwabena Frimpong-Boateng	2017	2021	Patricia Appiagyei	NPP	MESTI
Dr. Kwaku Afriyie	2021	2024	No deputy appointed for most the tenure	NPP	MESTI
Ophelia Mensah Hayford	2024	2025	None publicly appointed	NPP	MESTI
Ibrahim Murtala Muhammed	2025	-	None publicly announced	NDC	MESTI

== Agencies ==
- Council for Scientific and Industrial Research(CSIR)
- Ghana Atomic Energy Commission(GAEC)
- Environmental Protection Agency(EPA)
- Land Use & Spatial Planning Authority
- National Biosafety Authority
- Nuclear Regulatory Authority, Ghana
- The E-Waste Fund

== Objectives ==
- The intensification of the application of safe and sound environmental practices;
- The development and promotion of a science and technology culture at all levels of society.
- To enhance the protection of forests
- Strengthen the fights against climate change
- Enhance laws to protect waterbodies
- Combact environmental pollution
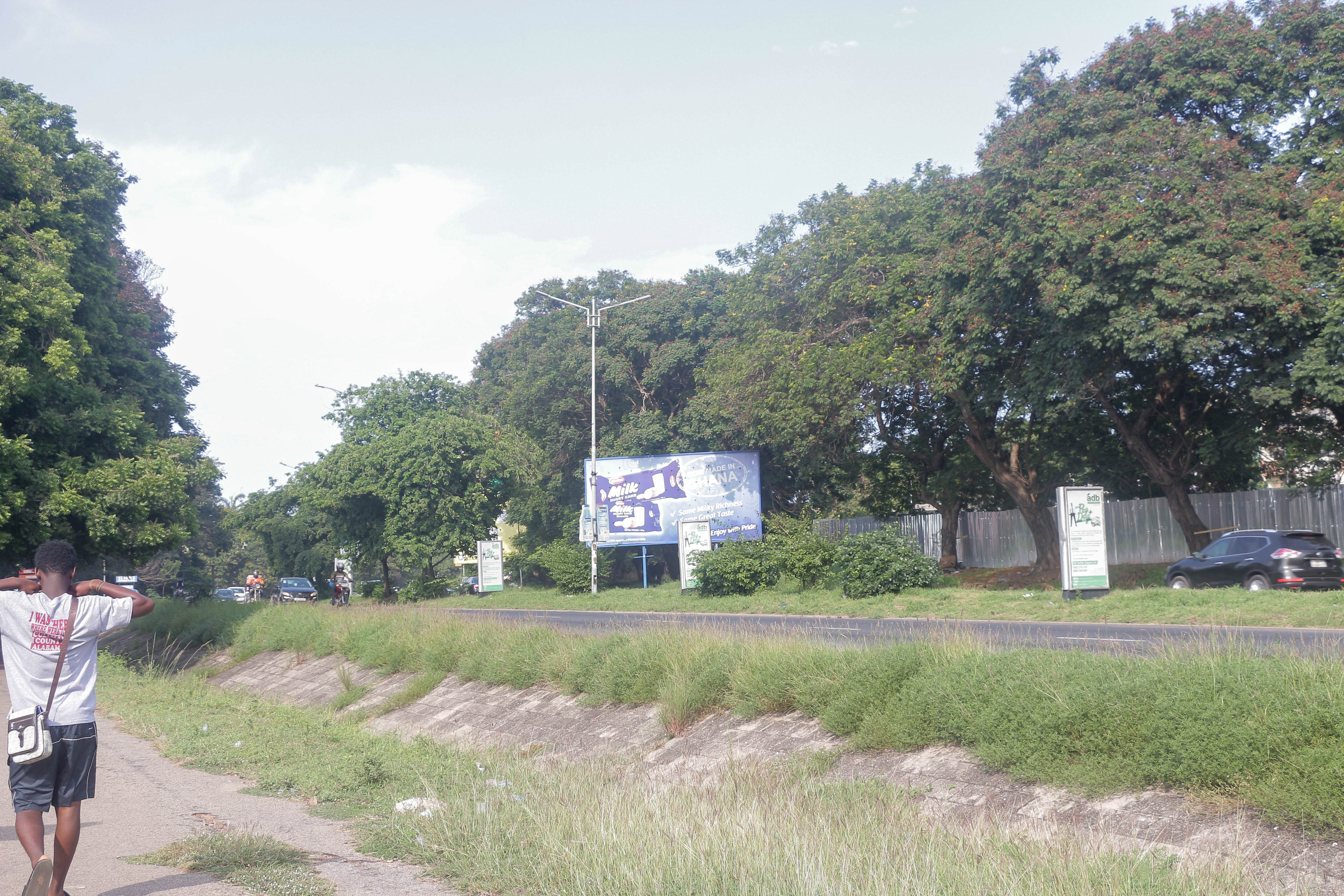
  Trees make the environment look beautiful and provide shade
  The development of the sector's institutionalized delivery capacities in human resource management, infrastructure and plant/equipment through appropriate policies and legislation.
- The promotion of public demand for science and technology products and services;
- The encouragement and strengthening of compliance of human settlements standards in communities;
- The strengthening of linkages with local and international collaborating agencies;
- The promotion, co-ordination and evaluation of research and development activities;

How These Objectives Are Achieved

MESTI implements these goals by collaborating with its specialized agencies. For instance, the EPA enforces environmental compliance, while the CSIR conducts the industrial research needed to upgrade local technologies.Ghana Space Science and Technology Centre

== Functions ==
- Encourage actions required to support the measures and policies needed for projecting and carrying out sound scientific and technological development actions;
- Ascertain the classification, monitoring, rating and to supervise the activities of Environment, Science, Technology and Innovation while seeing to the economic benefits.
- Ensure appropriate and efficient environmental direction and administration.
- Ensure the appropriate management of all planned programs and see to budgets in the area of environment, science, technology and innovation sector of the economy for aims of attaining a unified management system.

CORE VALUES OF THE MINISTRY

- Integrity
- Client Satisfaction
- Gender Equity
- Professionalism
- Teamwork

LAWS PASSED UNDER THE MINISTRY

- Environmental Protection Act, 2025(Act 1124): this law transitioned the Environmental Protection Agency (EPA) into an Authority, allowing it expand regulatory powers to enforce strict industrial emissions, manage hazardous waste and establish the Ghana Carbon Registry for climate action.
- Hazardous and Electronic Waste Control and Management Act, 2016(Act917): it provides the regulatory framework for the control,safe management and disposal of hazardous waste and e-waste, helping to protect human health and the environment.
- National Plastic Management Policy (2020):Implemented under MESTI to govern and systematically reduce plastic pollution alongside the Plastic Waste Management Regulation(2019), although it is more of a policy than a parliamentary act.
- Water Resources Commission Act (Act 522):it empowers the water resources commission to regulate and manage water resources in Ghana.
- Maritime Pollution Act, 2016 (Act 932): This law regulates and prevents maritime pollution, enforcing standards to care and protect Ghana's coastal ecosystems and oceans.
