= Christianity in Ghana =

Christianity in Ghana (2021 census)
1. Pentecostal (44.0%)
2. Other Protestant (24.0%)
3. Roman Catholic (14.0%)
4. Other Christian (18.0%)

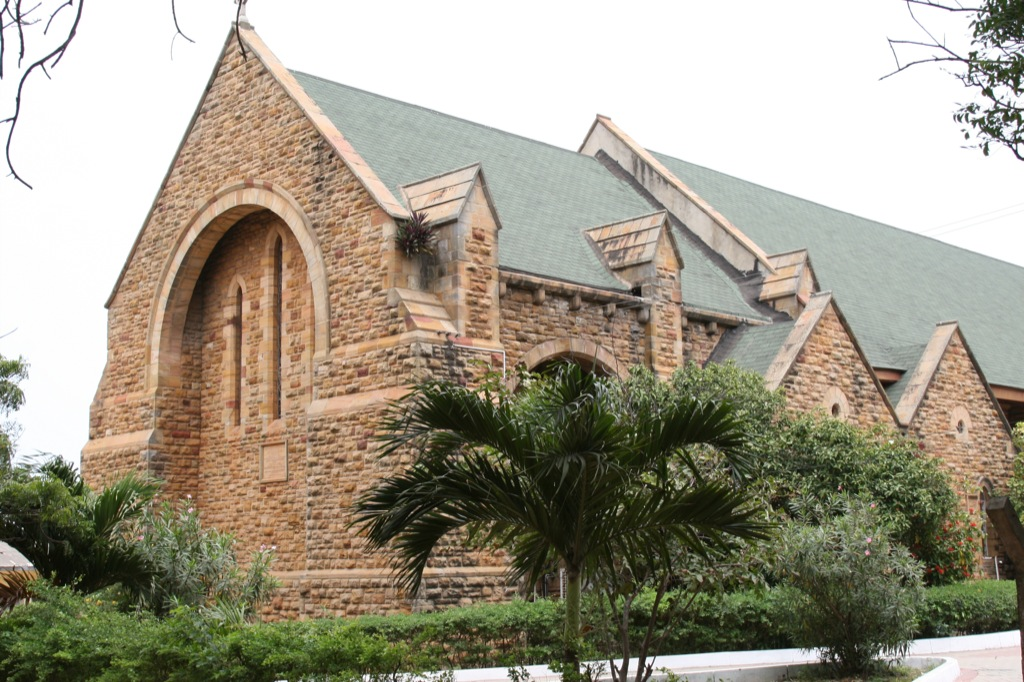
Holy Trinity Anglican Cathedral in the capital Accra.

Christianity is the religion with the largest Denomination in Ghana. Christian Life Charismatic Denomination, Catholics, Methodists, Anglicans, Presbyterians, Lutherans, Seventh-Day Adventists, Pentecostals, Baptists, Evangelical Charismatics, Latter-day Saints, etc.

According to the census figures of the year 2000, out of Ghana's 18.8 million people, Christians made up 69 percent of the population of Ghana. The 2010 Population and Housing Census puts the figure at slightly over 71 percent of the total population of over 24 million people. A 2015 study estimated some 50,000 believers in Christ from a Muslim background.

According to the 2021 census, 71.3% of the population belonged to a Christian denomination.

== History ==
The arrival of the Europeans in 15th century into the then Gold Coast brought Christianity to the land. There were many different cultural groups across the West African region who were practicing different forms of spirituality. As the Europeans explored and took control of parts of the country during the colonial days, so did their religion.

== Denominations ==
=== Methodism in Ghana ===
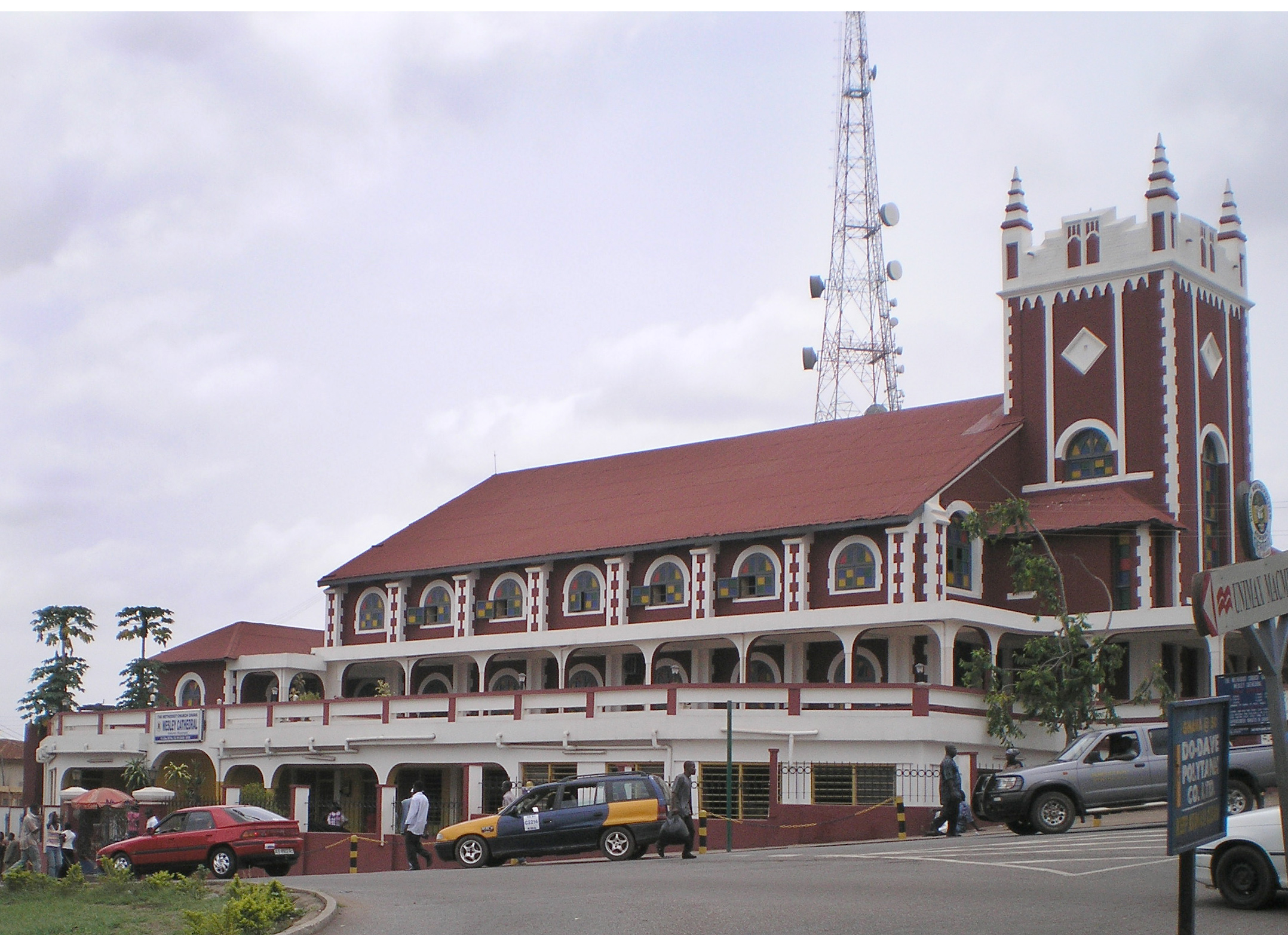
Wesley Methodist Cathedral in Kumasi

The Methodist Church Ghana came into existence as a result of the missionary activities of the Wesleyan Methodist Church, inaugurated with the arrival of Joseph Rhodes Dunwell to the Gold Coast (Ghana) in 1835. Like the mother church, the Methodist Church in Ghana was established by people of Anglican background.

=== Latter-day Saints ===
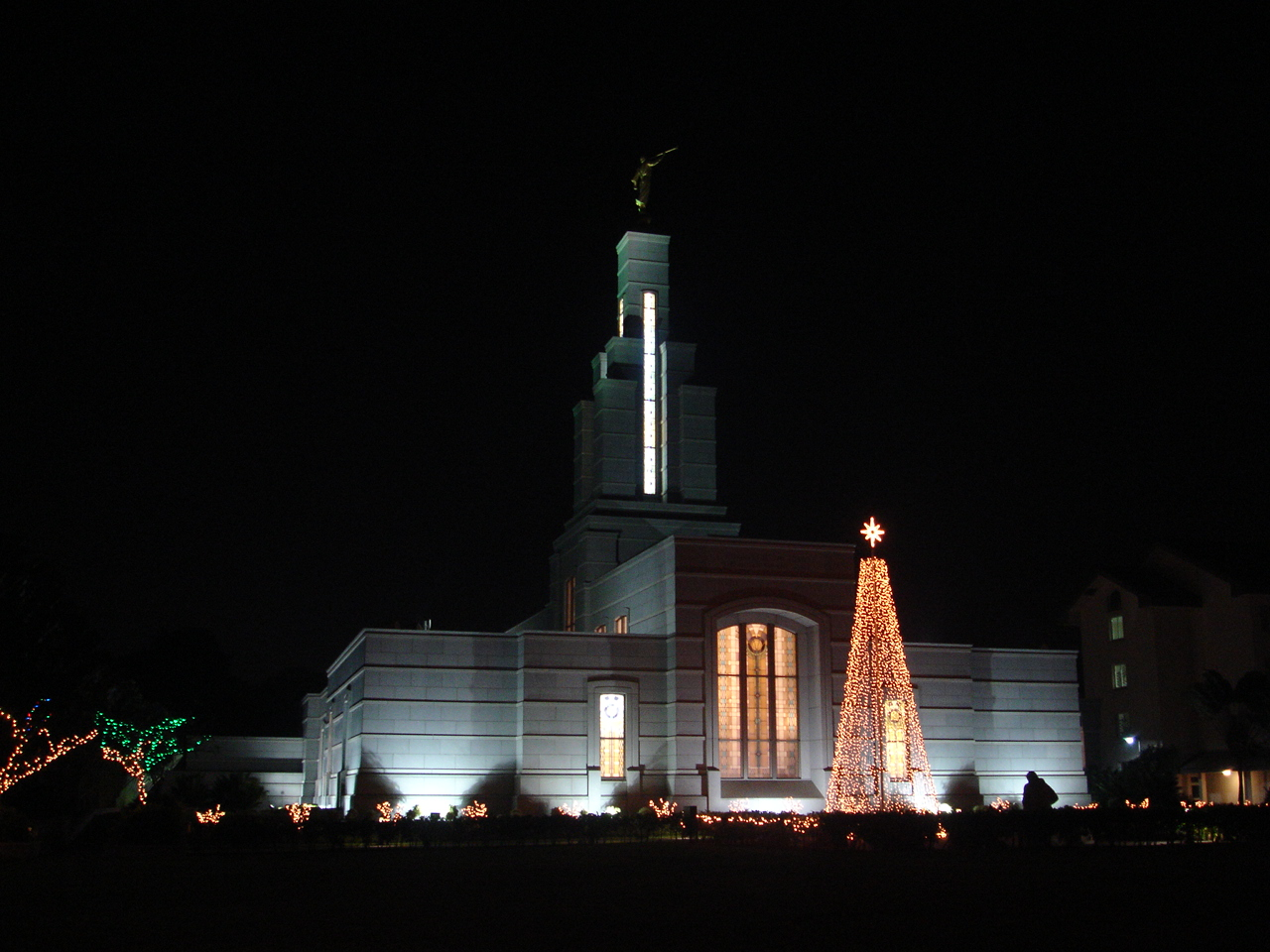
Accra Ghana Temple (LDS)

The Church of Jesus Christ of Latter-day Saints has 113,000 members in 387 congregations in Ghana. They also have 86 family history centers, 6 missions, and 1 temple in Ghana, with 2 more announced.

=== Seventh-day Adventists ===
Seventh-day Adventist missionaries arrived in Ghana in 1888. 60 percent of its members in Ghana are Ashanti. In 2014, were almost 400,000 members worshipping in 1,243 congregations. They have 916 schools, 13 hospitals and 12 clinics in the country.

== Impact of Christianity ==
Various aspects of Ghanaian development and nation-building have all been impacted upon due to the role Christianity plays.

=== Education ===
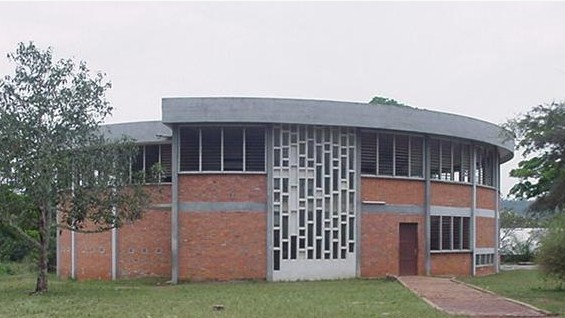
The Chapel of St. Peter's Boys Senior Secondary School in Nkwatia Kwahu, Eastern Region of Ghana

At every level of education in the country, there are mission schools that exist with the purposes of:

- Teaching Government of Ghana approved curricula
- Imparting moral discipline into students

However, the main aim of establishing these schools is to impact the values of the various faiths or missions into the younger generation to ensure continuity. Almost all mainline churches have schools at the primary, secondary and tertiary levels of education in the country. Consistently, over 95 percent of the country's top-performing second cycle institutions are all mission schools. The most well-known church-affiliated schools amongst them are:

- Aburi Girls' Secondary School – Presbyterian – Aburi
- Adisadel College – Anglican – Cape Coast
- Archbishop Potter Girls' School – Catholic – Takoradi
- Holy Child School – Catholic – Cape Coast, and Fijai, Sekondi
- Mfantsipim School – Methodist – Cape Coast
- Opoku Ware School – Catholic – Kumasi
- Prempeh College – Methodist/Presbyterian – Kumasi
- Pope John Senior High School and Minor Seminary – Catholic – Effiduase Koforidua
- Presbyterian Boys Secondary School – Presbyterian – Accra
- St. Augustine's College – Catholic – Cape coast
- St. Louis Secondary School – Catholic – Kumasi
- St Mary's Senior High School – Catholic – Accra
- St. Monica's School – Anglican – Mampong
- St. Peter's Boys Senior Secondary School – Catholic – Nkwatia Kwahu
- St. Roses Girls Secondary School – Catholic – Akwatia
- Wesley Girls High School – Methodist – Cape Coast
- Mawuli School – Evangelical Presbyterian Church Ghana (Ho)

=== Health care delivery ===
Currently, 42% of all the nation's health care needs are catered for by health establishments belonging to various Christian bodies in the country. The umbrella organization of which the various mission hospitals, clinics and facilities are members of is known as the Christian Health Association of Ghana (CHAG). Some of these facilities are in deprived areas of the country. CHAG serves as a link between Government and its Development Partners and CHAG Member Institutions and provides support to its members through capacity strengthening, coordination of activities, lobbying and advocacy, public relations and translation of government policies. The goal of CHAG is to improve the health status of people living in Ghana, especially the marginalized and the impoverished, in fulfillment of Christ's healing ministry. CHAG's 183 Member Institutions are therefore predominantly located in the rural (underserved) areas. CHAG plays a complementary role to the Ministry of Health (MOH) and the Ghana Health Service (GHS) and is the second largest provider of health services in the country.

=== Orange Order ===
The Grand Orange Lodge of Ghana, also known as The Loyal Orange Institution of Ghana, governs the Orange Order in the country. Established in 1894, it is a Protestant Christian fraternity whose beliefs are founded on the principles of the Reformation and the truths of the Bible. The Order's influence is primarily seen in its function as a Protestant friendly society that supports its members and the broader community. The organization, once predominantly white, began admitting Ghanaian locals, leading to its full integration and making it the most active Orange community in Africa. In its current form, the fraternity has created a network of like-minded individuals who share a common faith, William of Orange is viewed as a symbol of civil and religious freedom rather than a political one.

The Ghanaian Order engages in charitable work and promotes positive evangelicalism. Its music, regalia, and marching traditions have been adopted by the local culture, giving them a unique Ghanaian character. The Twelfth of July parade is celebrated annually.

== Gallery ==
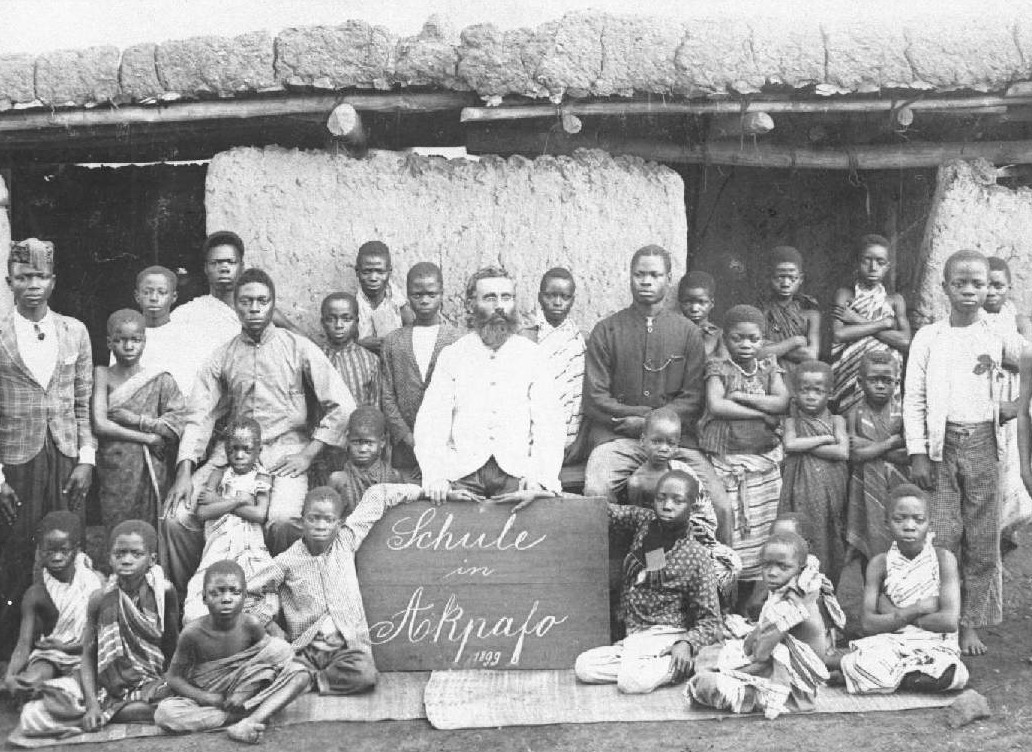
Missionary Andreas Pfisterer 1899 at the mission school in Akpafu, Togoland

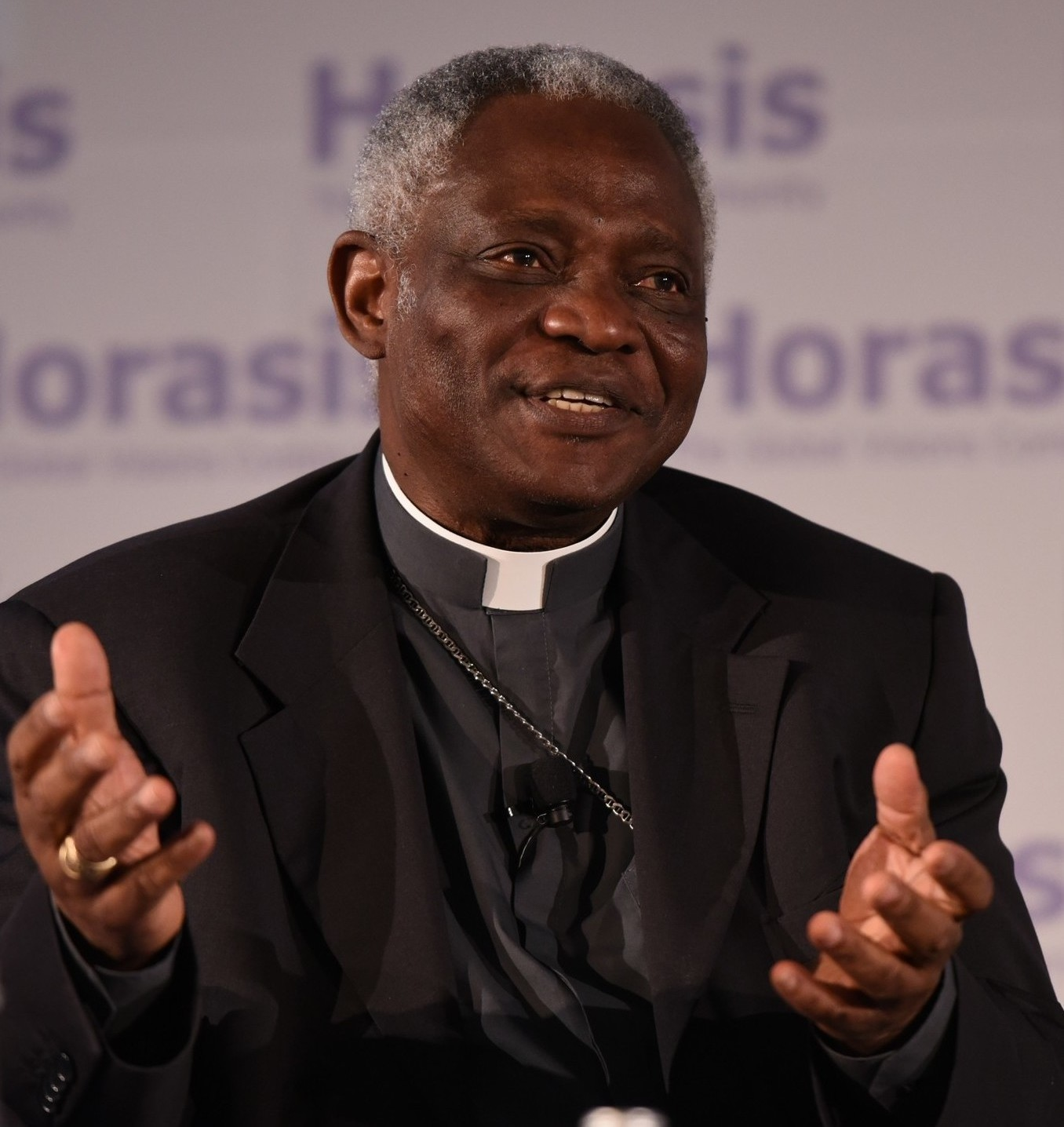
Peter Turkson is the Ghanaian Cardinal of the Catholic Church

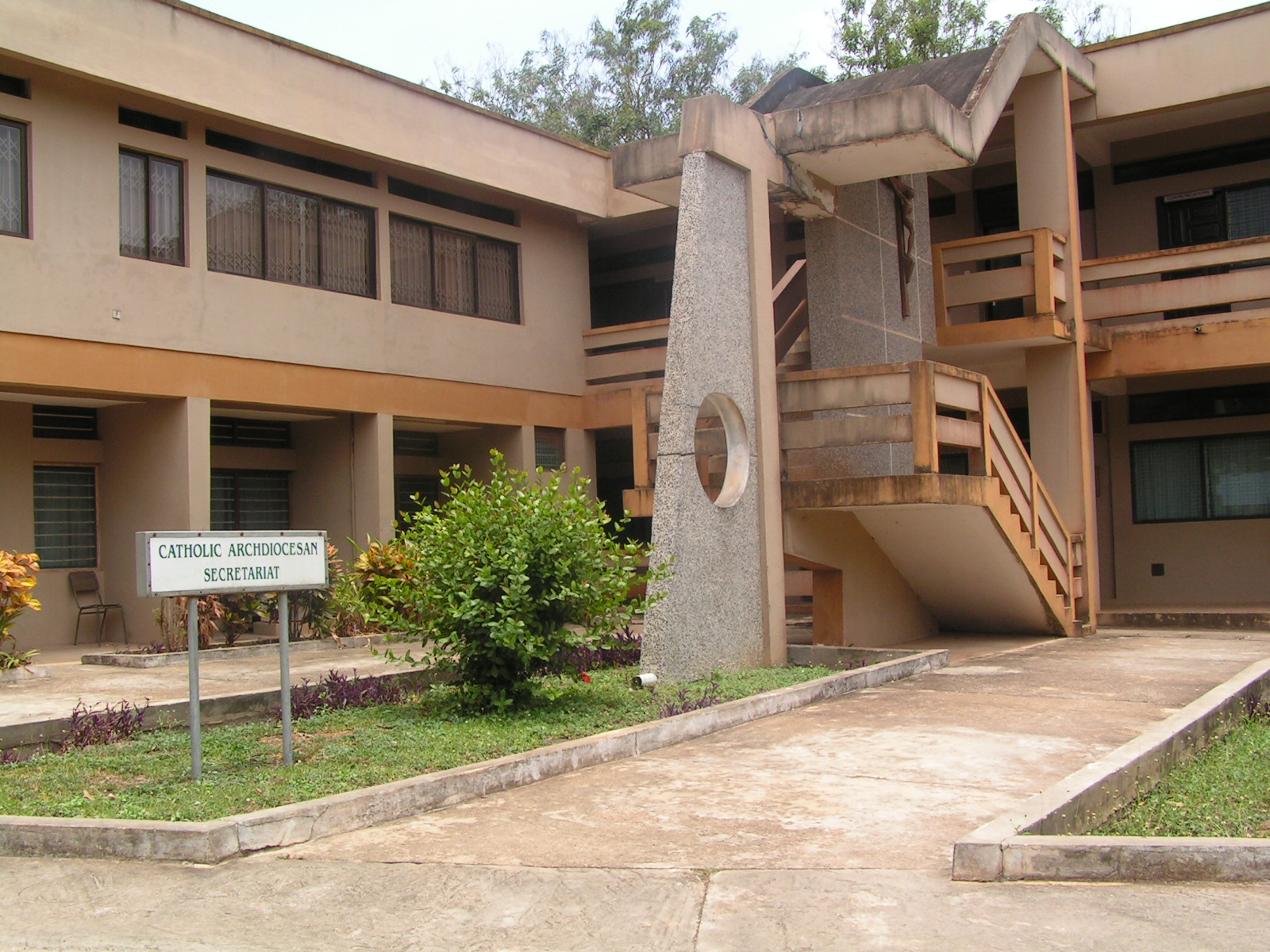
Roman Catholic Archdiocese of Cape Coast

Postcard photo of Anglican Holy Trinity Cathedral, Accra, Gold Coast, c. 1905. Basel Mission Book Depot no. 28

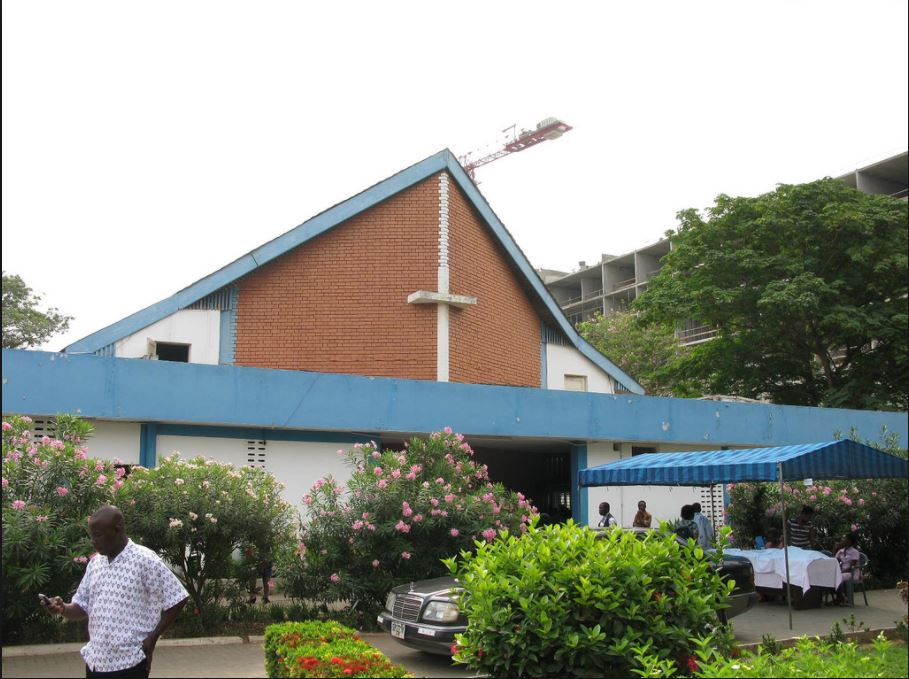
Accra Ridge Church

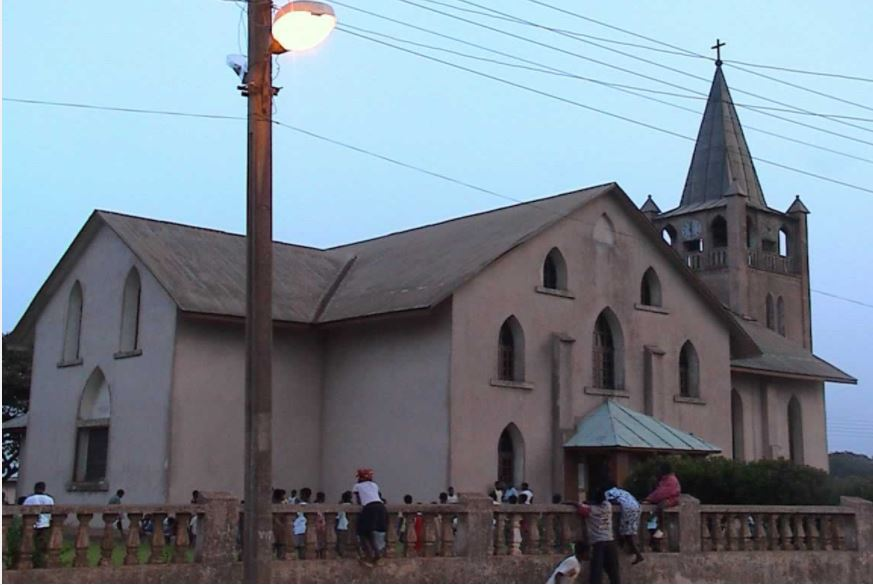
Christ Presbyterian Church Akropong

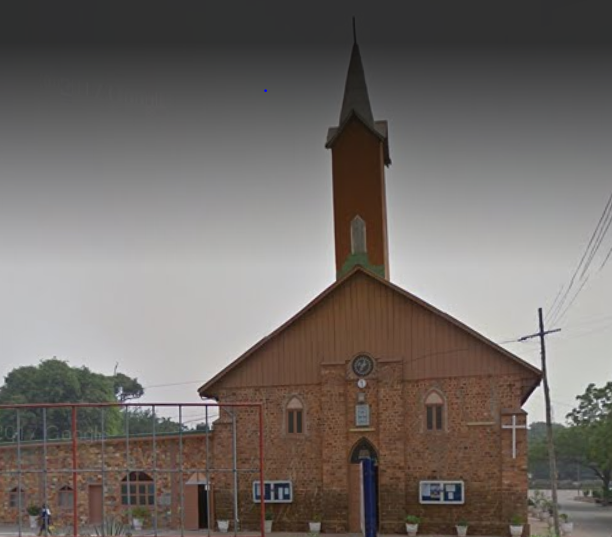
Osu Ebenezer Presbyterian Church

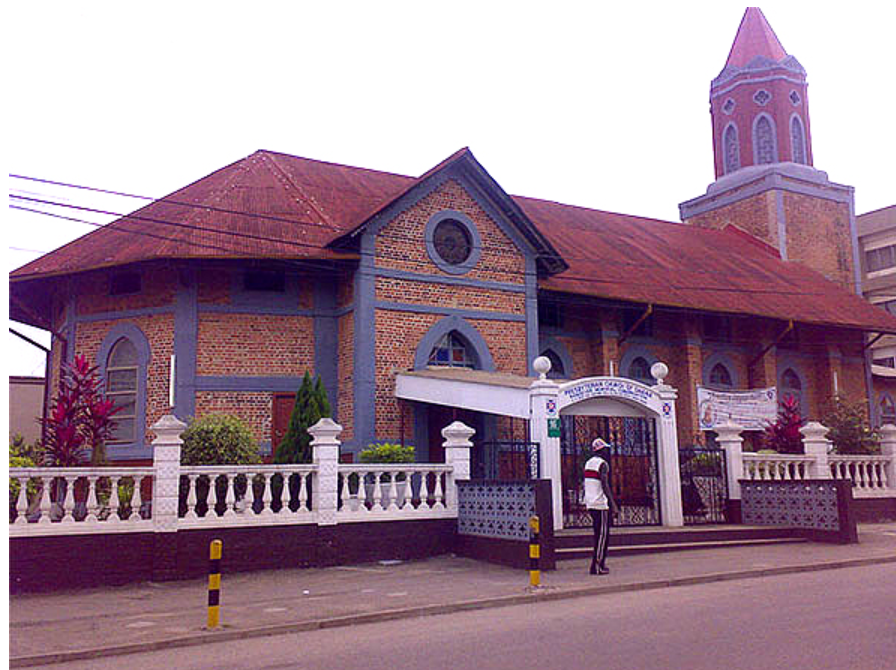
Ramseyer Memorial Presbyterian Church, Adum, Kumasi

== Selected individuals in Ghanaian Christianity ==
- Gottlieb Ababio Adom
- Seth Senyo Agidi
- Charles Agyin-Asare
- Clement Anderson Akrofi
- Justice Akrofi
- John Kodwo Amissah
- James McKeown (missionary)
- Francis Amenu
- Rose Akua Ampofo
- Sam Korankye Ankrah
- Gilbert Ansre
- David Asante
- Christian Gonçalves Kwami Baëta
- Joseph Oliver Bowers
- Livingstone Komla Buama
- Jacobus Capitein
- Emilie Christaller
- Johann Gottlieb Christaller
- Alexander Worthy Clerk
- Carl Henry Clerk
- Nicholas T. Clerk
- Nicholas Timothy Clerk
- Peter Poreku Dery
- Kwesi Dickson
- Nicholas Duncan-Williams
- Thomas Birch Freeman
- John Fogarty
- Dag Heward-Mills
- Peter Hall
- William Wadé Harris
- Regina Hesse
- Billy Johnson
- Tarcisio Isao Kikuchi
- Emmanuel A. Kissi
- Rose Ann Miller
- Catherine Mulgrave
- Peter Anim Newman
- Opoku Onyinah
- Theophilus Opoku
- Samson Oppong
- Mensa Otabil
- Charles G. Palmer-Buckle
- William Porter
- Christian Jacob Protten
- Rebecca Protten
- Philip Quaque
- Fritz Ramseyer
- Carl Christian Reindorf
- Andreas Riis
- Ian Strachan
- Maame Harris Tani
- George Peter Thompson
- Peter Turkson
- Rosina Widmann
- Johannes Zimmermann

== See also ==
- Religion in Ghana
- Anglican Diocese of Accra
- Catholic Church in Ghana
- Evangelical Presbyterian Church, Ghana
- Presbyterian Church of Ghana
- Basel Mission
- Bremen Mission
