= Noah Komla Dzobo =

Very Reverend Noah Komla Dzobo
- Died: 2010
- Resting place: Ho, Ghana
- Title: Moderater of the E.P. Church, Ghana
- Term: 1981 – 1993
- Predecessor: C. K. Dovlo
- Successor: Japhet Ledo

Noah Komla Dzobo (died 2010) was an academic and religious leader. He was also a former moderator of the Evangelical Presbyterian Church, Ghana. He was the chairman of the Dzobo committee that preceded the reform of the basic education system in Ghana. He served as the head of the E. P. Church from 1981 until 1993 when he was succeeded by Japhet Ledo. He died in 2010 and was buried at his request at the eastern premises of the Anfoega Bume E. P. Church. The current moderator of the General Assembly of the church, Francis Amenu, and the head of the Global Evangelical Church, E. K. Gbordzoe, embraced each other. The Global Evangelical Church is a breakaway branch of the E. P. Church following a schism some years ago.

== Mele Agbe ==
Dzobo was responsible for developing a new theology called Mele Agbe (I am alive).. In this he was breaking away from the theological dualism propounded by the original North German Missionary Society missionaries which demonised the orisha's of the Ewe people. In contrast he called for a synthesis of Christianity with these pre-Christian spiritual beliefs.

== Texts ==
- (1971) Modes of Traditional Moral Education Among Anfoega-Ewes Research Report. Cape Coast: University of Cape Coast
- (1976) The Idea of God Among the Ewe of West Africa Manuscript
- (1981) 'The Indigenous African Theory of Knowledge and Truth; Examples of the Ewe and Akan of Ghana' Conch No. 13 pp 85–102.
- (2006) "African Proverbs" A Guide to Conduct Volume III The Moral Value of Ewe Proverbs

== See also ==
- Evangelical Presbyterian Church, Ghana

== External links and sources ==
- Ghana Home Page
- ModernGhana.com

Religious titles
Preceded by C. K. Dovlo	Moderator of the Evangelical Presbyterian Church, Ghana; 1981 – 1993	Succeeded by Japhet Ledo
