= Baëta =

Surname list

Baëta is a surname of Portuguese language or Lusophone origin. The surname is common among an Anlo Ewe coastal family from Keta, Ghana and Lomé, Togo whose ancestors were Afro-Brazilian-Portuguese. Notable people with this surname include:

- Christian Gonçalves Kwami Baëta (1908–1994), Ghanaian academic, Presbyterian minister and Synod Clerk of the Evangelical Presbyterian Church of the Gold Coast from 1945 to 1949, who was instrumental in the establishment of the University of Ghana, Legon in 1948
- Annie Ruth Baëta Jiagge (1918–1996), women's rights advocate, the first woman in Ghana and the Commonwealth of Nations to become a judge
- Vinolia Akofala Comfort dite Davi Baëta, wife of Togolese president Nicolas Grunitzky
