= Japhet Ledo =

- Born: Ghana
- Occupation: Priest
- Employer: Evangelical Presbyterian Church, Ghana
- Title: Moderator, E. P. Church
- Term: 1993–2001
- Predecessor: Noah Komla Dzobo
- Successor: Livingstone Komla Buama

Japhet Yao Ledo is a former Moderator of the General Assembly of the Evangelical Presbyterian Church, Ghana (E.P. Church). He served as moderator of the church from January 1993 to January 2001, when he was replaced by Livingstone Komla Buama.

Ledo hails from Klefe in the Volta Region of Ghana, just as his successor Buama.

After retiring as Moderator, he served in various capacities including as Chairman of the Evangelical Presbyterian University Fund Raising Committee.

== See also ==
- Evangelical Presbyterian Church, Ghana

Religious titles
Preceded by Noah Komla Dzobo	Moderator of the General Assembly of the Evangelical Presbyterian Church, Ghana; 1993–2001	Succeeded by Livingstone Komla Buama
