= Seventh Day Adventist Nurses Training College =

The Seventh Day Adventist Nurses Training College is public tertiary health institution in Kumasi in the Ashanti Region of Ghana. The college is in the Kumasi Metropolitan Assembly. The activities of the institution is supervised by the Ministry of Education. The Nurses and Midwifery Council (NMC) is the regulates the activities, curriculum and examination of the student nurses and midwives. The council's mandate Is enshrined under section 4(1) of N.R.C.D 117. The institution is affiliated with the Seventh Day Adventist Church.
