= Ian Strachan =

Ian Strachan may refer to:

- Ian Strachan (minister), Scottish missionary and educator in Ghana
- Ian Strachan (Newfoundland and Labrador politician) (1940–2024), Canadian politician in Newfoundland and Labrador
- Ian Strachan (Ontario politician) (1898–1964), Canadian politician in Ontario
- Ian Strachan, president of the Edinburgh Mathematical Society
- Ian Strachan, a defendant in the 2007 royal blackmail plot
- Ian Strachan, British author of The Boy in the Bubble
