= Annie Jiagge =

Ghanaian judge and women's rights activist

Annie Jiagge GM

President of the Court of Appeal
- In office 1980–1983

Judge of the Court of Appeal
- In office 1969–1980

Judge of the High Court of Justice
- In office 1961–1969

Judge of the Circuit Court
- In office 1959–1961

Personal details
- Born: Annie Ruth Baeta; 7 October 1918 Lomé, French Togoland
- Died: 12 June 1996 (aged 77) Accra, Ghana
- Spouse: Fred Jiagge
- Relations: Christian Gonçalves Kwami Baëta (brother)
- Education: Achimota College; London School of Economics
- Profession: Judge; Lawyer
- Nickname: Auntie Annie

Annie Ruth Jiagge, GM (née Baëta; 7 October 1918 – 12 June 1996), also known as Annie Baëta Jiagge, was a Ghanaian lawyer, judge and women's rights activist. She was the first woman in Ghana and the Commonwealth of Nations to become a judge. She was a principal drafter of the Declaration on the Elimination of Discrimination Against Women and a co-founder of the organisation that became Women's World Banking.

== Early life and education ==
Annie Ruth Baeta was born on 7 October 1918 in Lomé, French Togoland. Her parents were schoolteacher Henrietta Baëta and Presbyterian minister Robert Domingo Baëta. She belonged to the Ewe ethnic group of southeastern Ghana and Togo. A member of the notable Baëta family, she was one of eight children, though only Annie and her siblings Christian, Lily, and William lived to adulthood. Her older brother, Christian Baëta, was an academic and Presbyterian minister who was elected the Synod Clerk of the Evangelical Presbyterian Church of the Gold Coast from 1945 to 1949 and was instrumental in the establishment of the University of Ghana, Legon in 1948. Her parents wanted her to have an English education so she lived in the coastal town of Keta (then in British Togoland) with her maternal grandmother.

Baeta attended Achimota College and earned her teacher's certificate in 1937. She was headmistress and teacher at the Evangelical Presbyterian Girls School from 1940 to 1946. After the buildings of the Evangelical Presbyterian School for Girls were washed away by the ocean in 1940, the girls were moved to the Evangelical Presbyterian School for Boys. The school was overcrowded, and Baeta knew it would be difficult to find funding for new buildings. She approached the Evangelical Presbyterian Church Choir and transformed it into a drama group that put on the George F. Rool musical David the Shepherd Boy. The performances were successful and the group was invited to perform in major Gold Coast cities and in Togo. Baeta was able to raise funds for a new school for the girls that was built by December 1945.

=== Studies in London ===
Baeta's time with the Evangelical Presbyterian Girls School was fulfilling but left her restless. She passed the London Matriculation Examination in 1945. Her elder brother Christian made inquiries to the University of London on her behalf and her mother secured loans for her. She was admitted to the London School of Economics and Political Science in 1946. Her male colleagues from the Gold Coast urged her to abandon her studies, thinking them too difficult for a woman. One offered to arrange a position for her at the Paris Academy to study dress design. She told them she would return to the Gold Coast if she didn't pass her first examination. She passed, and was no longer bothered by the men. She received her LLB in 1949 and was called to the Bar at Lincoln's Inn the following year. Baëta also participated in religious and social work during her free time in London. She worked with youth camps organised by the Young Women's Christian Association (YWCA) and was elected to the Executive Committee of the World YWCA during her final years as a student.

== Legal career, women's rights activism and legacy ==
Baeta established a private practice upon her return to the Gold Coast in 1950. She led a public relations initiative to establish a national YWCA for the colony and a documentary film was produced as part of the drive to educate the public about the organisation. Baeta married Fred Jiagge on 10 January 1953. She gave up the Bar and became a magistrate for the Bench in June 1953. In 1954, she began regularly attending the conferences of the World Council of Churches. From 1955 to 1960, she was president of the YWCA. She and her husband adopted a child, Rheinhold, in 1959. In 1959, she became a judge for the Circuit Court.

Injustice eats me internally. I get very restless when I come in touch with it.

— Annie Jiagge

After learning of a young woman who was raped in Accra after coming there from the countryside for a job interview, Jiagge sought government assistance to provide safe accommodations for visiting women. She secured an audience with Ghanaian president Kwame Nkrumah and convinced him of the project's importance. She spearheaded a successful campaign in 1961 that raised substantial funds for a YWCA women's hostel. That year she became a judge of the High Court of Justice. From 1961 to 1976 she was a council member of the University of Ghana. In 1962 she was appointed to represent Ghana on the United Nations Commission on the Status of Women. She was asked to chair the Commission to Investigate the Assets of Senior Public Servants and Named Political Leaders in 1966. She championed women's rights through her work at the United Nations, representing Ghana through 1972. In 1966, she was elected rapporteur of the Commission. During a meeting in Iran in 1967, the Commission was charged with preparing a document on the elimination of discrimination against women. Worried that a draft wouldn't be finished by the time they left Iran, Jiagge met other members of the team, including Iranian Princess Ashraf Pahlavi, and drafted the document in a single night. It was sent to UN member-states for comment and was later adopted. The Declaration was an important precursor to the legally binding 1979 Convention on the Elimination of All Forms of Discrimination Against Women. Jiagge was elected chair of the Commission's 21st session in 1968.

Jiagge was awarded the Grand Medal of Ghana and the Gimbles International Award for Humanitarian Works in 1969. She was named a judge of the Court of Appeal that same year, the highest court in Ghana at the time. She was the first female judge of the Court of Appeal. She was awarded an honorary law degree from the University of Ghana in 1974. In 1975, she founded the Ghana National Council on Women and Development and was its first chair. As chair, she convened a meeting of Ghanaian women to learn their views on Equality, Development and Peace, the theme of the 1975 International Women's Conference in Mexico. She learned that access to credit was a priority for her country's women and led Ghana's delegation to the conference. She and others pledged seed money for a women's bank, and the organisation Stitching to Promote Women's World Banking (now Women's World Banking) was founded and headquartered in New York. She later served on the board of Women's World Banking in Ghana. Jiagge also served as a president of the World Council of Churches from 1975 to 1983. In 1979, she was a member of the constituent assembly which wrote the constitution of the Ghana's Third Republic. She was the World Council of Churches' moderator for their Programme to Combat Racism from 1984 to 1991 and mobilised against South Africa's system of apartheid.

Jiagge was appointed President of the Court of Appeal in 1980 where she led the Ghanaian delegation again to the International Women's Conference in that same year She remained President of the Court of Appeal until her retirement in 1983. She helped plan the Fourth World Conference on Women as a member of the UN Secretary-General's advisory group that year. In 1985 she served on a United Nations panel that conducted Public Hearings on the Activities of Transnational Corporations in South Africa and Namibia. She also served on the Committee of Experts who drafted Ghana's Constitution in 1991.

From 1993 until her death, Jiagge served on Ghana's Council of State. She died on 12 June 1996 in Accra. The Justice Annie Jiagge Memorial Lectures were established by the Ministry of Women and Children in 2009. A boarding house, the Annie Baëta Jiagge House, formerly, House 17, at her alma mater, Achimota School was named in her memory in recognition of her role as a trailblazer in the legal profession in Ghana.

== Awards ==
- The Grand Medal of Ghana (1969)
- The Gimbles International Award (1969)

== See also ==
- First women lawyers around the world
