= Livingstone Komla Buama =

Former Moderator of E.P. Church, Ghana

The Rt. Rev. Dr. Livingstone Komla Buama
- Born: Ghana
- Occupation: Priest
- Employer: Evangelical Presbyterian Church, Ghana
- Title: Moderator of the General Assembly
- Term: 2001-2009
- Predecessor: Rt. Rev. Japhet Ledo
- Successor: Rt. Rev. Francis Amenu

The Right Reverend Livingstone Asong Komla Buama is a former Moderator of the General Assembly of the Evangelical Presbyterian Church, Ghana (E.P. Church).

Buama hails from Klefe in the Volta Region of Ghana.

He became moderator in January 2001 after serving for over 25 years in the church. Prior to this, he had been lecturing at the Trinity College and Seminary at Legon in Ghana.

Livingstone Buama was runner up in elections as Volta Region's representative on the Council of State of Ghana in February 2009.

== See also ==
- Evangelical Presbyterian Church, Ghana

Religious titles
Preceded by Japhet Yao Ledo	Moderator of the General Assembly of the Evangelical Presbyterian Church, Ghana; 2001 - 2009	Succeeded by Francis Amenu
