= Klefe =

- Village
- Nickname: Kleviawo
- Motto: Zendo
- Location within Ghana
- Coordinates: 6.6195°N 0.4475°E
- Country: Ghana
- Region: Volta Region
- District: Ho Municipal District
- Elevation: 248 m (814 ft)
- Time zone: GMT
  - Summer (DST): GMT

Klefe is a small town in the Ho Municipal District of the Volta Region of Ghana. It is in the southern part of the Volta Region. The town is set on a hill and there are trails for hiking.

== Location and economy ==
Klefe is about 2 kilometres west of Ho. About 2.8 kilometres to its south is Hoviefe. Akrofu and Agove are villages to the west and Ziavi is the nearest village north. Klefe also shares a boundary with Sokode It is at 248 metres above sea level. With a huge deposit of sedimentary rocks, Klefe is popularly called "Stone city". This is because of the secondary economic activity of the youth which is Schist (flat stone) mining. The metamorphic rocks are usually used for tiling walls and floors.

== History ==
The inhabitants of Klefe were the first to settle on modern day Ho Bankoe but migrated to the mountains due to the marshy nature of the land. They are believed to have migrated here from Notsie which is in modern-day Togo to escape King Togbe Agorkoli. The local inhabitants are referred to as the 'Kleviawo'. Klefe people were in the company of the Aŋlɔ Klikor, Kpeve, Tsibu, Weta and Tsoxor people from Glime in modern-day Togo. They are collectively called the Zendoawo who celebrates Glimezã annually in rotation. Kleviawo culturally were farmers noted to produce yam in the past on large scales. They for that matter celebrate yam festival annually in September like many other Eʋe people in the area to thank their gods for bumper harvest. Also, the people of Klefe have been known to cultivate large palm, cashew and cocoa plantations. People from neighbouring villages usually buy palmwine for occasions from Klefe. There are three main villages that make up the town, namely: Achiatime, Dome and Demete. These villages got their names per the circumstances as they settled on the land. The first town driving from Ho used to be home to large cashew plantations hence the name Achiatime (literally: amidst the cashew trees). Dome means a great valley and Demete (literally: leaning against the mountains) the third town leans against the mountains.

== People ==
The Klefe Traditional Area (KTA) is made up of three villages namely Achiatime, Dome and Demete (in that order from Ho towards Akrofu). The KTA is ruled by a paramount chief whose seat is at Dome Nyafa. The current paramount chief or king (known locally as the 'Fiaga') is Togbe Kɔku Dzaga XI. There are seven divisional areas also ruled by chiefs known as kɔmefiawo. In Achiatime are three (3) divisional areas: Afɔkpo, Anasime and Ɣede. Tɔgbe Sapey, Tɔgbe Addo and Tɔgbe Amegbɔe respectively, are the divisional chiefs. The Kpɔdiwula is a clan/division in Klefe Dome and is currently ruled by Tɔgbe Kpɔn who is also the AfetɔFia (they were among the first settlers on the land) of Klefe. In Demete the last village, Tɔgbe Adzayao Saka X is the divisional chief. The town has subchiefs of which one is the 'Asafofia' (an army general back in the day, responsible for rallying the youth to war. But currently to engage youth in communal activities) of Klefe. As of April 2009, this was Togbe William Dzanku.

The people are mostly Christians, predominantly belonging to the Evangelical Presbyterian Church, Ghana (E.P. C.G) which is more than 100 years old. This affiliation, dedication and immense contribution to the church ended up with two indigenes of the village, Rev Ledo and Rev. Livingstone Buama, as (former) Moderators of the General Assembly of the Evangelical Presbyterian Church, Ghana. There are however about 20 churches in the town, including The Global Evangelical Church, Assemblies of God, Church of Pentecost as ones with fairly large congregations. Traditionally, each of the Klefe Divisional areas have their own ancestry belief systems. These include: Yɔhɔlü, Aʋli, Aʋlinyigbe, Azamalikpe, Tokploekudze as their gods. A prominent ancestor of the people of Klefe Demete was Tɔgbui Deikumah from the Great Agbodei Family whose first-fourth generation descendants could number over 1000 people forming greater than 75% of the Demete community. Klefe has many illustrious sons and daughters and prominent surnames from Klefe include: Azuma, Modey, Nkrow, Letsa, Dzanku, Deikumah, Buama, Loh, Kasu, Hosi, Ayidzoe, Agyei and Ledo.

== External links and sources ==
- Ho Municipal District Official website
