= North German Missionary Society =

Christian organisation based in Germany

North German Mission
- Norddeutsche Mission
- Abbreviation: NM
- Secretary General: Heike Jakubeit
- Associations: Evangelische Missionswerk in Deutschland (EMW); Brot für die Welt; Waldensian Evangelical Church
- Headquarters: Bremen
- Origin: 19 April 1836; 189 years ago Hamburg
- Other name: Bremen Mission
- Official website: www.norddeutschemission.de

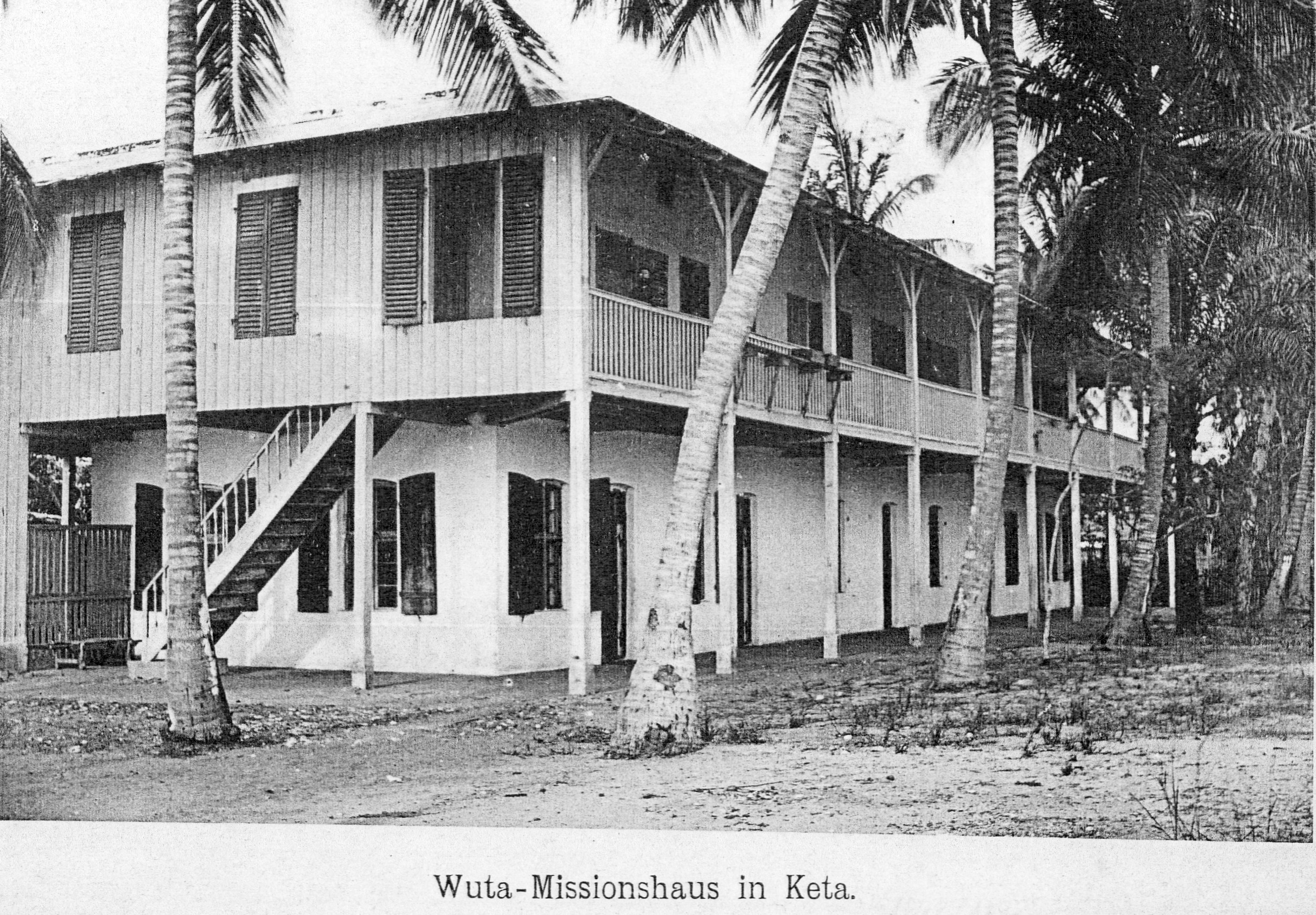
Mission Station, Keta, 1894

The North German Missionary Society or North German Mission is a Presbyterian Christian organisation based in Bremen formed on 19 April 1836 to unify missionary work in North Germany. The society has also been active among the Ewes in southeastern Gold Coast, now Ghana. The mission was engaged in New Zealand and India prior to concentrating its activities in Ghana from 1847.

Reverend Johan Hartwig Bauer was the first Inspector and he established a school for missionaries in Hamburg.

== History ==
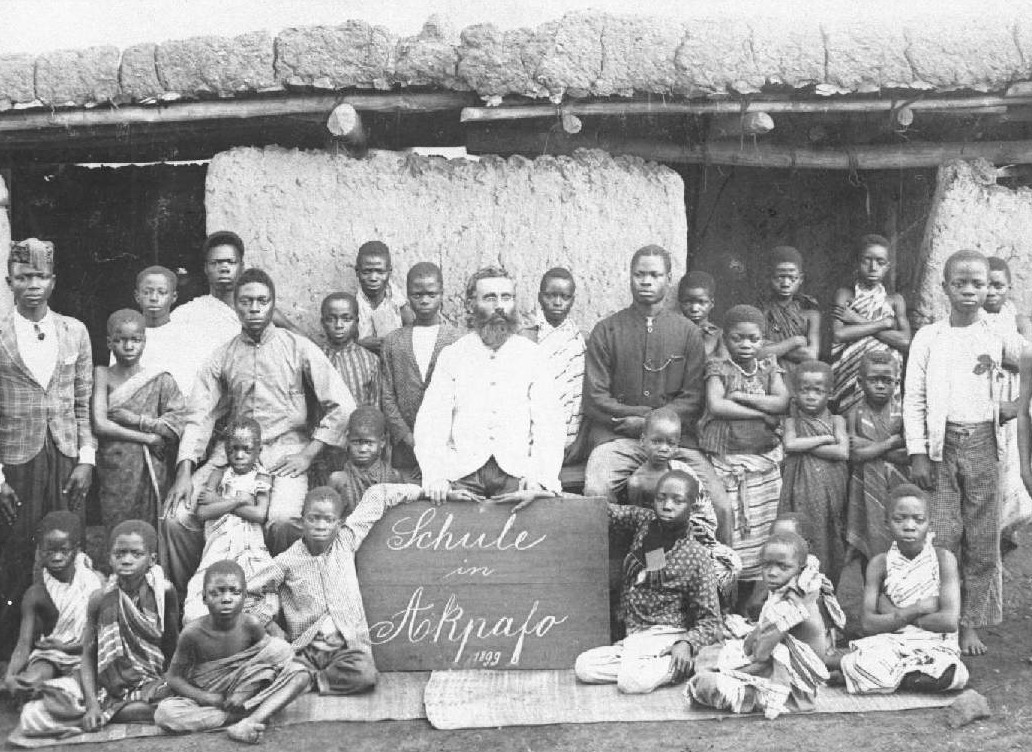
Missionary Andreas Pfisterer 1899 at the mission school in Akpafu, Trans-Volta Togoland, which was at that time a German colony but is now Ghana

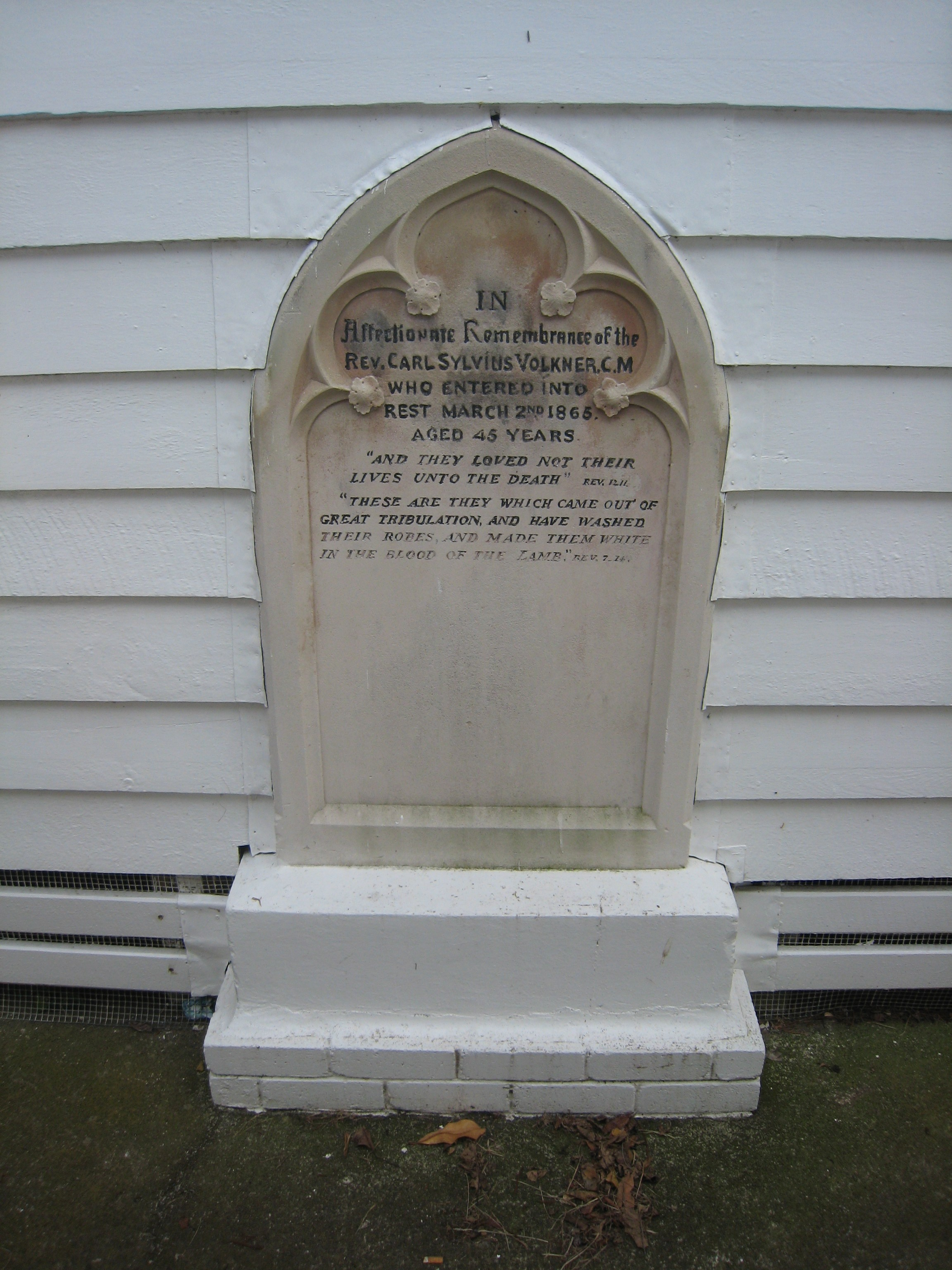
Völkner's gravestone on the church wall in Opotiki

The North German Mission was founded in 1836 by Lutheran and Reformed missionary associations in Hamburg.

Missionary Carl Sylvius Völkner arrived in New Zealand on behalf of the Society in 1849 and was murdered there by the Māori as a missionary of the Church Missionary Society (CMS) in 1865, provoking a military backlash. The matter is known in New Zealand as Völkner Incident. The church in Ōpōtiki is named "St Stephen the Martyr" after him.

After the first activities in New Zealand and India, the mission concentrated its work from 1847 on the area of the settlement area of the Ewe in the then slave coast. It has been based in Bremen since 1851 and is known in West Africa as Bremen Mission or Mission de Brême. Pastor Cornelius Rudolf Vietor a founding member in 1851, was the chairman and president of the board from 1868 to 1888. Johann Carl Vietor, a merchant in West Africa, was a member of the company's executive committee.

The mission area was divided between the two colonial powers, the United Kingdom and France in 1890: it was a foreign mission on the British ruled Gold Coast and a national mission in German Togo. Embedded in this colonial field of tension, the North German Mission tried to find its way between the fronts. In Togo, it maintained its independence from the government within the school system by preferring the native language Ewe to the colonial language German. It also sought to preserve the traditional local structures. During this era, the head of mission, inspector Franz Michael Zahn (from 1862 to 1900), was known to have a colonial-critical attitude, which is born by submissions in the German parliament. There was a change under his successor Schreiber (from 1900 to 1924) towards an uncritical attitude towards the colonial powers.

During the First World War, the German Togoland colony was conquered by the French and British. 52 mission employees were detained. After the division into British and French mandates, community support from the mission was prohibited. Close contact with Bremen however remained.

The occupation of the mission area by the Western Powers was a first step towards the independence for the young West African church. In 1914 it had approximately 11,000 members, 14 pastors and 237 religious teachers.

In May 1922, local representatives of the missions met in Kpalimé for a synod. The colonial government had banned the participation of Europeans. The assembly declared the union, independence and unity of the parishes as the "Evangelical Ewe Church". Pastor Robert Kwami became its first leader and Synod Clerk.

Between 1923 and 1939, the North German Missionary Society was again able to send its people. The previous one-way traffic from Germany to West Africa gradually gave way to a sibling partnership. The 150 lectures given by the African Synod Secretary, Robert Kwami in 82 locations in northern Germany were accompanied by a racist Nazi campaign in Oldenburg shortly before Hitler came to power. The so-called Kwami affair not only caused a sensation in Germany but Dutch and English daily newspapers also reported on this prelude to church struggle.

After Togo and Ghana gained independence from the colonial powers, the churches there asked the North German Mission for assistance. In 1961, employees who did not act as missionaries were sent to Togo and Ghana. In 1980 the four German churches listed in the "Members" section merged into a common mission. In 2001, the Eglise Évangélique Presbytérienne du Togo and the Evangelical Presbyterian Church, Ghana, which resulted from the missionary work, were included in the North German Mission as equal partners in a new statute.

=== Christian mission and written language ===
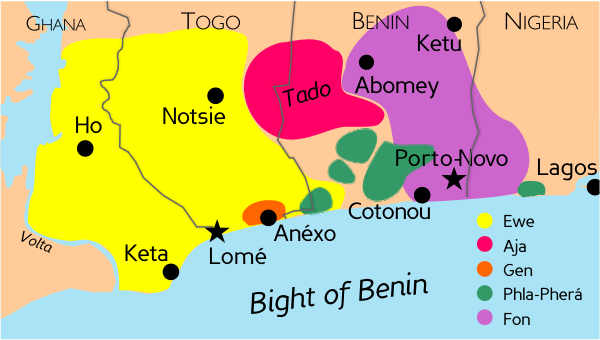
The yellow area is the original distribution area of the Ewe language.

When the missionaries of the North German Mission arrived in Africa, there were several dialects of the highly developed Ewe language, which only existed as spoken, not as written language. The missionaries learned the language and developed a script from Latin letters with the addition of phonetic characters. The missionaries worked out Bible translations, catechism, song and school books in the new written language. The four Gospels were translated by the missionary Johann Bernhard Schlegel (1827–1859) and printed in 1861. There followed the book of the Acts of the Apostles and the letters of Paul, Peter, James and Judas, which were translated by the missionaries Weyhe and Merz. Schlegel had decided to choose the Anlo Ewe dialect for the creation of the written language, which is spoken mainly in the western part of the language area on the coast. In 1856/57 he published a “Key to the Ewe Language”. The entire New Testament was available in 1877 in the translation of the missionary Merz. The missionaries Jakob Spieth and Gottlob Däuble edited the present translations and published a second edition of the Gospels, Acts, and Letters. The First Book of Moses in the Old Testament, Genesis, was printed in Ewe in 1870, followed by the Psalms, then the Book of Joshua, the Book of Judges and the Book of Ruth, and finally the Book of Samuel, the second book of Moses, the book of kings, and the prophets Isaiah and Jeremiah. Johannes Knüsli wrote an Ewe-German-English dictionary in Europe from 1887 to 1888. After his death on 23 May 1891, his widow Anna Knüsli published the "lithographic" dictionary Ewe-German-English in 1891. A complete edition of the Bible was available in 1913. The final design of the font was done by Diedrich Hermann Westermann who, at the turn of the century, in the service of mission, developed a comprehensive dictionary with over 15,000 words, which first appeared in 1905 and completed a final grammar of Ewe in 1907. Westermann returned from Africa in 1907 due to illness and retired from serving as a missionary, but remained an honorary member of the North German Mission.

== Members ==
The North German Mission is a mission of six partner churches that work on an equal footing in the mission. The partner churches in Germany are the Evangelical Church of Bremen, the Evangelical Lutheran Church in Oldenburg, the Evangelical Reformed Church in Germany and the Church of Lippe, in Africa the Evangelical Presbyterian Church of Togo (EEPT) and the Evangelical Presbyterian Church, Ghana.

== Tasks ==
"The proclamation of salvation in Christ for the salvation of lost souls" - this is how the task of the North German Mission was understood exclusively for many years. After Togo's political independence, the church developed its own missionary approach there: “'The whole gospel for all people'. Salvation in Christ is that God wants to make the whole world we live in new. According to Genesis 2:7 "God breathed into his nostrils the breath of life and man became a living soul." The “North German Mission” understands “soul” to mean the whole person and focuses its work on him. Many development aid projects are designed to enable people to live a human life. The transition from the old "pagan" religion to Christianity is no longer in the foreground. The goal is rather the realization of the Word of God in the different areas of life of the people. The evangelical mission should become concrete in people's daily lives. They should be able to live together in a protected environment in peace and justice.

== Testimony and Gospel ==
Every year on Trinity Sunday, the North German Mission invites all to a partnership service in its partner churches. A 300-page four-language children's Bible in Ewe, German, English and French was developed and illustrated together with groups of girls and boys from Africa and Europe.

== Bible translation ==
Johann Bernhard Schlegel and Andreas Jakob Spieth were early Bible translators of the mission society.

== Intercultural learning and development ==
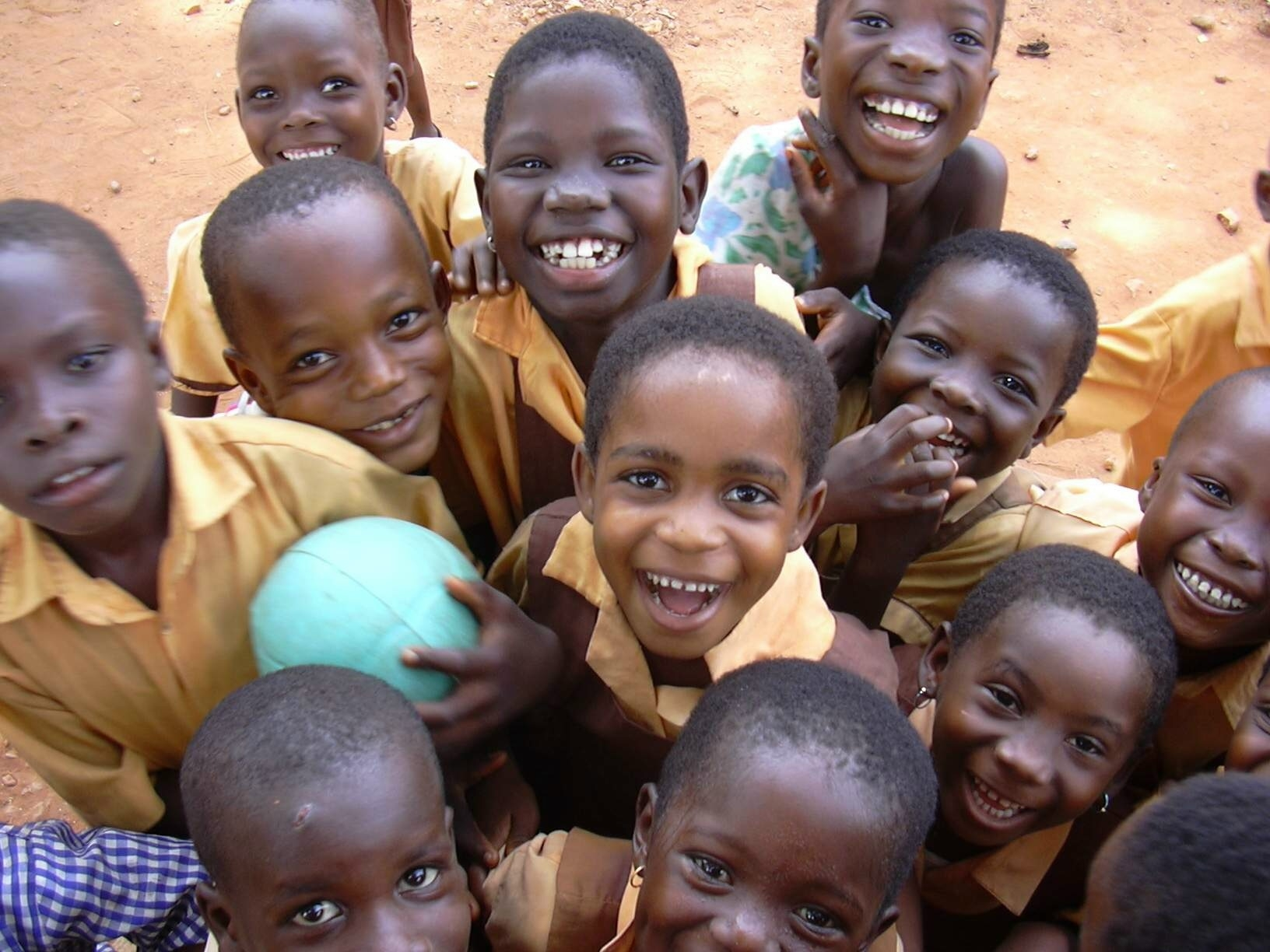
Happy children in front of a primary school in Ghana

The member churches of the North German Mission in the two African countries operate over 600 of their own primary and secondary schools, several high schools (Mawuko, Saboba, Tatale, Hohoe, Badou, Lomé-Agbalépédogan, Tado) and teacher training centers (Amedzofe and Bimbilla). The German member churches provide help with the establishment and operation of the training centres. Scholarships are often awarded. Music education is also a focus. The African partner churches maintain, partly together with other churches, training centres for pastors and catechists in Porto Novo, Atakpamé, Peki and Accra.

Vocational training: The churches also organise handicraft training for young people in tailoring, secretarial skills, housekeeping, tailoring, carpentry, building trade, electrical installation and in the use of computers.

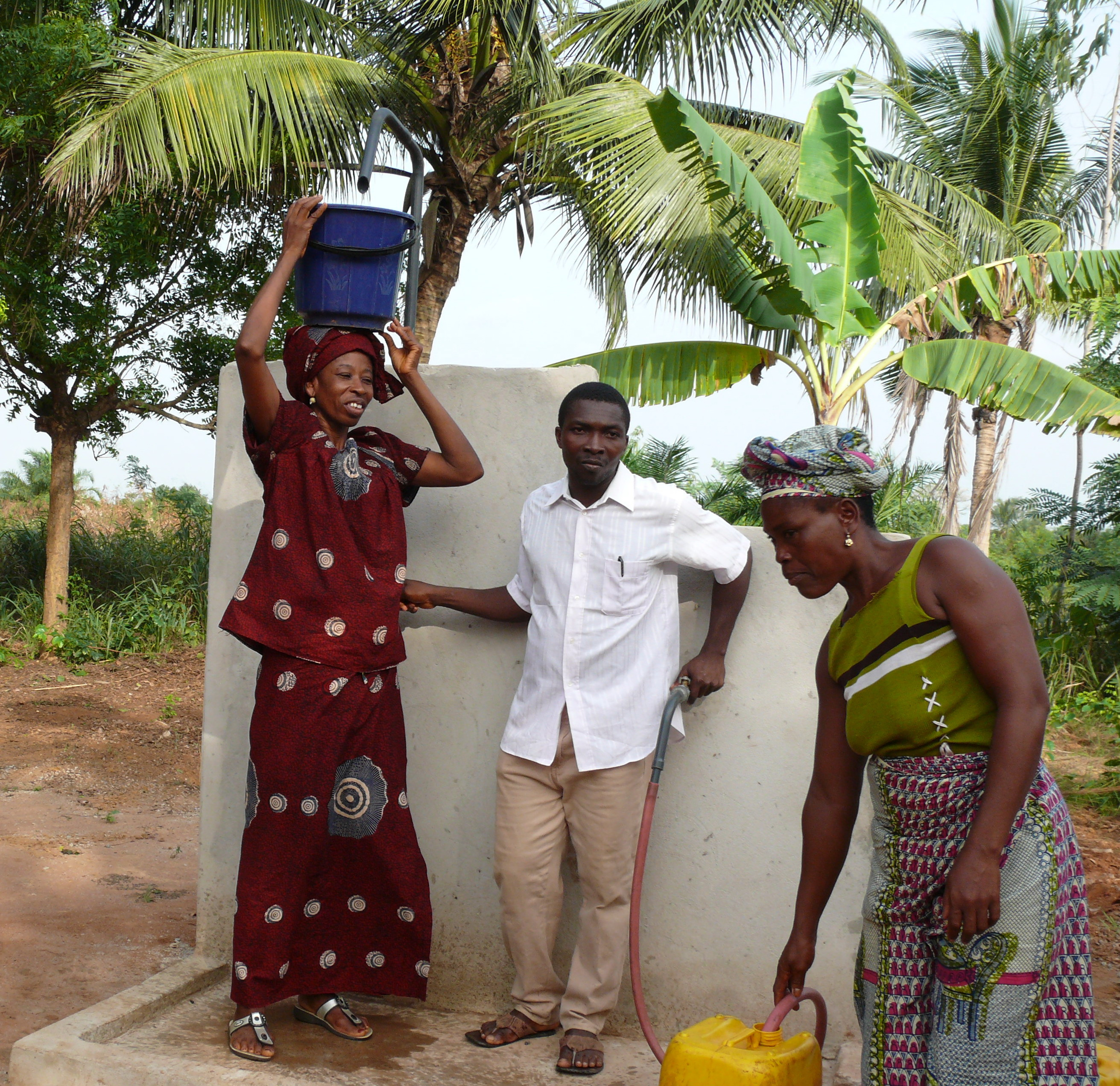
The construction of a well near Kpalimé in Togo

Nutritional advice and new cultivation methods. There are also rural development and advisory centers or model farms in Chereponi, Yendi, New Ayoma, Ho, Dambai, and Moyen Mono. Small animal husbandry and new products are propagated. The North German Mission supports many development aid projects with a focus on sustainable agriculture. Protecting the rainforest, reforestation and combating bushfires are all part of this. An important topic: water. Wells are built and equipped with solar pumps. Women's work: Bible studies, literacy courses, training centres, and income-generating projects such as bread baking or handicrafts.

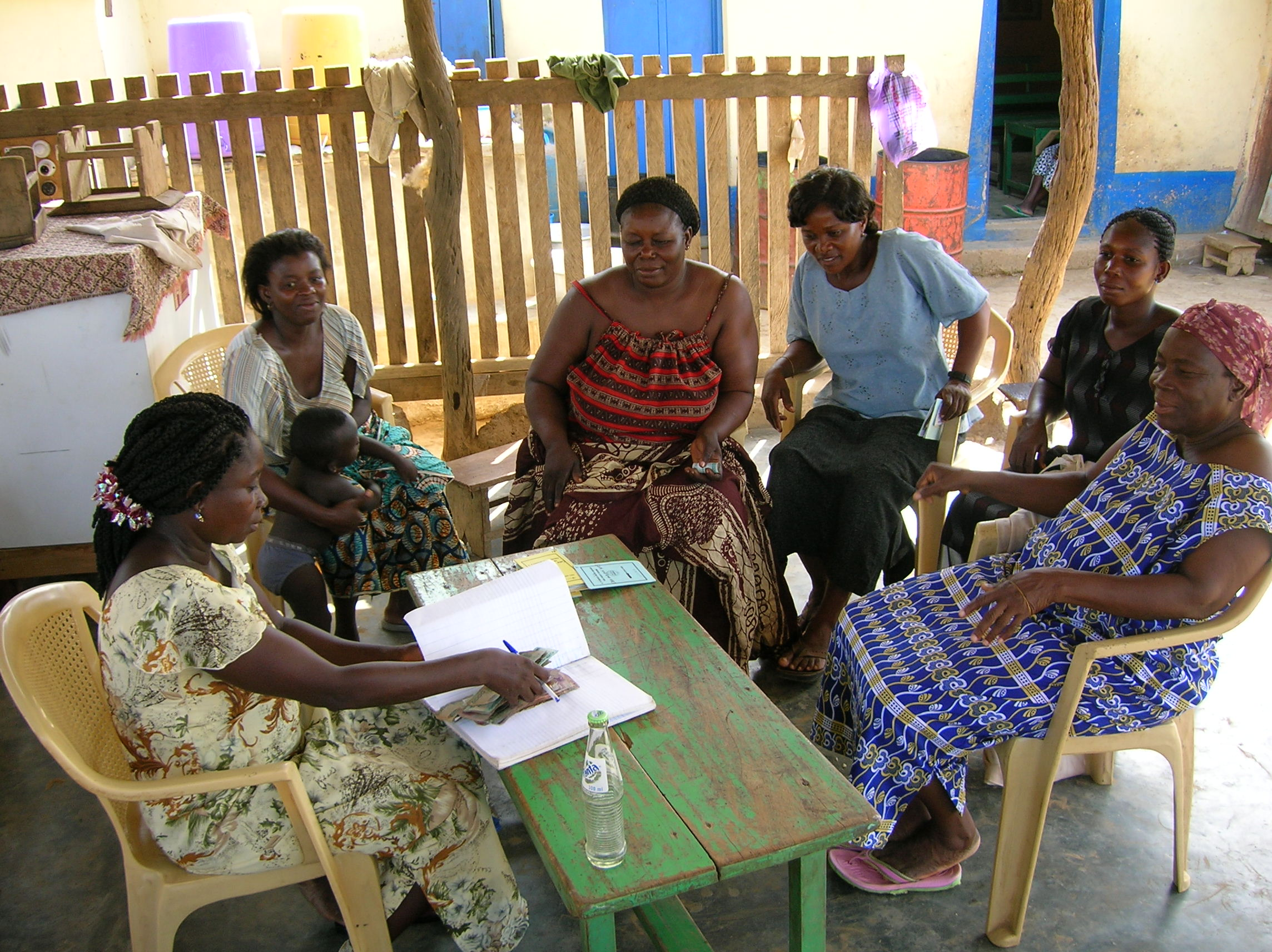
Ghanaian women managing microcredit

The granting of small loans is organized by women. This enables small business projects such as handicrafts, fish trade, grain trade and hairdressing salons. This project is based on ideas similar to those of Nobel Peace Prize winner Muhammad Yunus. Women's programs in particular are often about generating additional income.

Youth work: Self-help projects assist young people to find employment.

Children: An education campaign is fighting child slavery. Street children are reintegrated into their families through a counseling program or receive support to attend school. Many children cannot go to school because they have to take care of the younger siblings while their parents are working. That is why the Protestant churches of Ghana and Togo have set up qualified kindergartens and preschools in their congregations.

Food security: In Northern Togo, the women's department of the Evangelical Church is working on buying soy, rice and néré at harvest time and later selling it again at moderate and fair prices.

Democracy and human rights : These include free elections, pluralistic democracy, reconciliation between hostile political groups, the fight against child trafficking, peace work in the broadest sense. Peace work: Seminars for non-violent conflict resolution are organized. An office in Lomé is working to combat illegal gun ownership. Projects are carried out to achieve the goals.

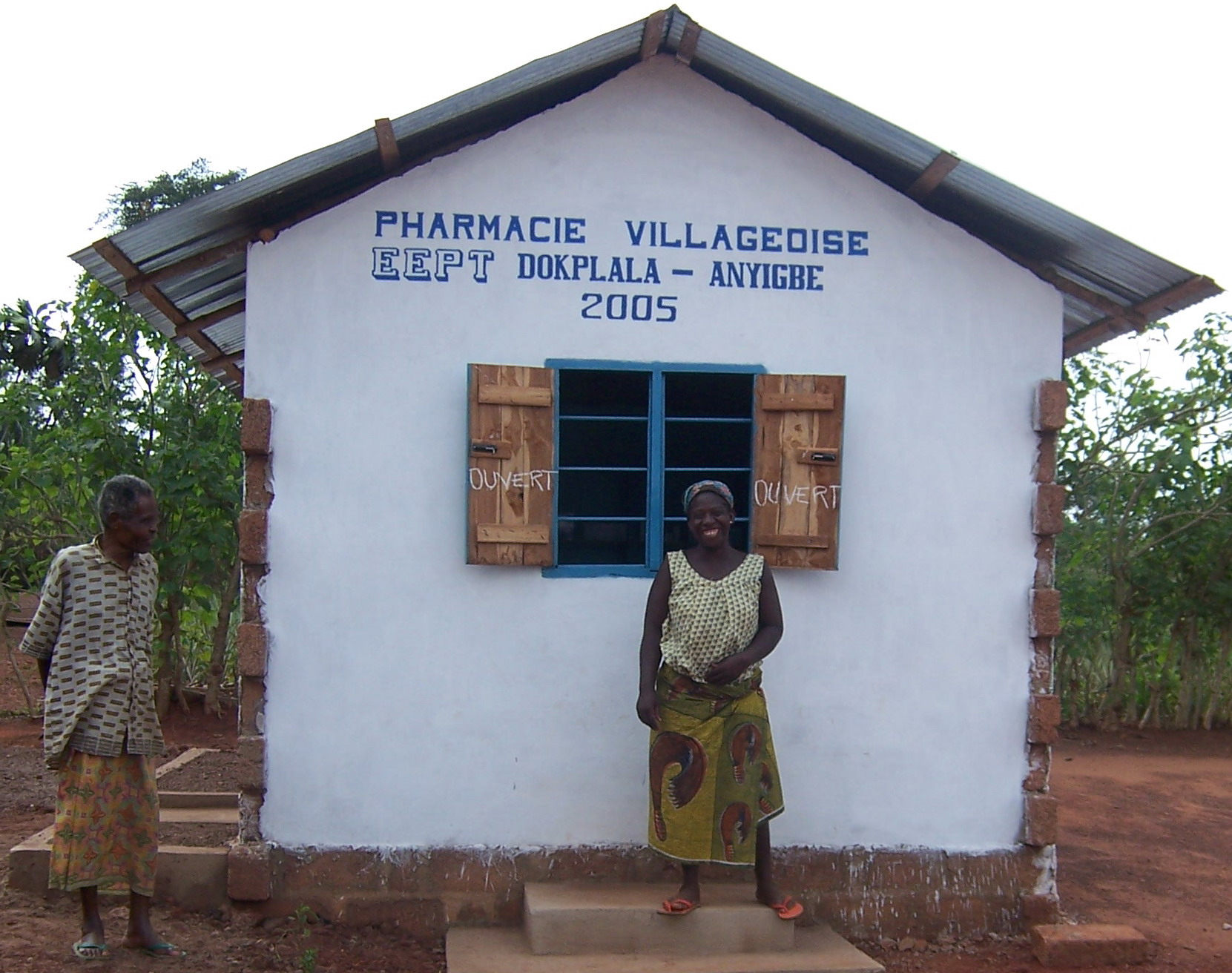
The municipality in Dokplala took the initiative to build this pharmacy.

== Diakonia ==
The six churches work closely together to promote aid agencies and promote existing projects, with new institutions being created over and over again. The goal of “helping people to help themselves” is often recognizable, the start-up financing is intended to help the poorer sections of the population to create their own earning opportunities. Young people, women and the elderly are the focus of the diaconal work.

Curative medicine: EEPT and E. P. Church maintain numerous health centres, hospitals and pharmacies. An important principle of health work is disease prevention. This includes counselling and regular examinations of the children in the villages, family planning, AIDS education programs and support for AIDS orphans and people infected with HIV. Organised vaccinations against tetanus, polio and measles. Social work: The E. P. Church runs a centre for life and family counselling. To prevent ethnic conflicts, the Church is involved in peace work. Prison counselling supports prisoners in Ho, Ghana.

== Literature ==
- Werner Raupp (ed.): Mission in source texts. History of the German Evangelical Mission from the Reformation to the World Mission Conference. Edinburgh 1910, Erlangen 1990.
- Evangelical lexicon for theology and community. Volume II, paperback, published by Scm R. Brockhaus, 1998, ISBN 978-3-417-24674-2, p. 1450.
- Werner Ustorf: Franz Michael Zahn's method of mission and the establishment of church structures in West Africa. A missionary history investigation. * Verlag der ev.-luth. Mission Erlangen, 1989, ISBN 3-87214-307-7.
- Martin Pabst: Mission and Colonial Policy. The North German Mission Society on the Gold Coast and in Togo. Publishing association ANARCHE, Munich 1988, ISBN 3-927317-00-4.
- Stefanie Lubrich: Missionary education of girls and women. Case studies from West Africa. Small writings of the State Archives Bremen, Issue 32. Published by the University of Bremen and the State Archives Bremen, 2002, ISBN 3-88722-532-5.
- Sonja Sawitzki: Ho / Wegbe. The establishment of a mission station in West Africa. Small writings of the Bremen State Archives, Issue 33. Published by the University of Bremen and the State Archives Bremen, 2002, ISBN 3-88722-535-X.
- Alsheimer, Rainer: Dreams of a West African Papal States in German Togoland: Plans in the North German Mission Society 1900–1914. In: Bremisches Jahrbuch, Volume 83, Bremen 2004, pp. 181–196. ISSN 0341-9622.
