= Francis Amenu =

Former Moderator of E.P. Church, Ghana

The Very Reverend Francis Amenu
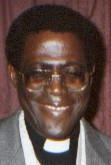
- Rev. Amenu while Ghana Chaplain in London
- Born: Ghana
- Education: Trinity Theological Seminary, Legon; Christian Theological Seminary
- Occupations: Mining Engineer; Priest
- Employer: Evangelical Presbyterian Church, Ghana
- Title: Moderator of General Assembly of E. P. Church, Ghana
- Term: 2009 - 2015
- Predecessor: Rt. Rev. Dr. L.K. Buama
- Successor: Seth Senyo Agidi
- Spouse: Gertrude Evelyn Diaba
- Children: 4

Francis Amenu (born ?) is a Ghanaian metallurgical engineer who also trained and ordained as a minister. He served in the Evangelical Presbyterian (E.P.) Church, Ghana. In 1999, he was assigned to serve Ghanaian congregations in London, United Kingdom. There in 2003, before returning to Africa, he founded the E.P. Church, UK.

In 2009 Amenu was elected as the first Moderator of the General Assembly of the Evangelical Presbyterian Church, Ghana, after the gathering was changed from a General Synod. He is addressed as the Right Reverend. He served in that position until 2015. He also served as the Chairman of the Christian Council of Ghana beginning in 2013.

== Education ==
Francis Amenu was born to an educated family in Ghana. After attending local schools, he was educated as a mining engineer at the Kwame Nkrumah University of Science and Technology School of Mines at Tarkwa in the Western Region of Ghana between 1973 and 1976.

He next was called to Christian ministry. He studied at the Trinity Theological Seminary, Legon in Ghana between 1982 and 1990. He later attended the Christian Theological Seminary, Indianapolis, Indiana, in the United States, between 1995 and 1997.

== Christian ministry ==
Amenu served in various capacities in the E.P. Church between 1985 and 1999, including as the head pastor at the Accra New Town branch of the church.

In 1999 he was posted to London in the United Kingdom (UK), where he was the Ghanaian Minister in London and chaplain to the Ghanaian community in the United Reformed Church in the UK between 1999 and 2003. He was instrumental in starting the UK branch of the E.P. Church during his stay there.

Since his return to Ghana in 2003, Amenu served as the District Pastor at Madina. He also served as a lecturer at the Trinity Theological Seminary, and the new Evangelical Presbyterian University College at Ho in Ghana.

In August 2008, Rev. Amenu was elected as the Moderator of the General Synod of the E.P. Church at its 67th synod at Ho. He had unsuccessfully stood for election as the Synod Clerk of the church in 2004.

The churches changed the name of their decision-making body from General Synod to a General Assembly in 2009. That year, Amenu was elected to succeed Livingstone Buama as the first Moderator of the General Assembly of the Evangelical Presbyterian Church, Ghana (E.P. Church). His six-year term ended in 2015. He was succeeded by Seth Agidi.

Francis Amenu became the Chairman of the Christian Council of Ghana in 2013. He was succeeded in April 2014 by Emmanuel Martey, who was also Moderator of the Presbyterian Church of Ghana at the time.

== Marriage and family ==
He is married with four children together.

== See also ==
- Evangelical Presbyterian Church, Ghana

Religious titles
Preceded by Livingstone Komla Buama	Moderator of the General Assembly of the Evangelical Presbyterian Church, Ghana; 2009 - 2015	Succeeded by Seth Senyo Agidi
Preceded by Emmanuel Asante	Chairman of the Christian Council of Ghana; 2013 - 2014	Succeeded by Emmanuel Martey
