= Agbalépédogan =

Coordinates: 6.1994°N 1.1988°E

Agbalépédogan is a northern suburb of Lomé, Togo. It is one of the educational areas of the city and a number of colleges and schools are located in Agbalépédogan.
