= Christian Baëta =

Ghanaian academic and minister

Christian Baëta FGA
- Christian Baëta
- Born: Christian Gonçalves Kwami Baëta; 23 May 1908; Keta, Gold Coast
- Died: 1994 (aged 85–86)
- Known for: Synod Clerk, Evangelical Presbyterian Church of the Gold Coast (1945 - 1949); Higher education fundraising
- Relatives: Annie Jiagge (sister)

Academic background
- Education: Scottish Mission Teacher Training College, Akropong; Evangelisches Missionsseminar, Basel, Switzerland; King’s College, London (PhD)

Academic work
- Discipline: Christian theology; Missiology; Study of religions
- Institutions: University of Ghana, Legon

Christian Gonçalves Kwami Baëta FGA (23 May 1908 – 1994) was a Ghanaian academic and a Presbyterian minister who served as the Synod Clerk of the Evangelical Presbyterian Church of the Gold Coast from 1945 to 1949. He was among a number of prominent individuals, corporate organisations and civil society groups that were instrumental in the establishment of the University of Ghana, Legon in 1948.

== Early life and education ==
Christian Gonçalves Kwami Baëta was born in 1908 in Keta on the Gold Coast, to Robert Domingo Baëta, a Presbyterian minister and Henrietta Baëta, an educator. He was a member of the Ewe people of southeastern Ghana and Togo. A member of the distinguished Baëta family, he was among four of eight children who lived to adulthood. His other siblings were named Lily and William Baëta. He and his siblings grew up in Keta as their parent wanted them to have an English-based formal education. His notable sister was Annie Ruth Baëta Jiagge (1918 – 1996), the first woman in Ghana and the Commonwealth of Nations to become a judge. She was also an advocate of women’s rights. Christian Baëta had his primary and middle education at Keta schools founded by Bremen missionaries. He then proceeded to the Scottish Mission Teacher Training College, Akropong (Basel Mission Seminary) to study theology and pedagogy to become a teacher-catechist. He was then awarded a scholarship for further studies at the Evangelisches Missionsseminar in Basel, Switzerland and ordained a Presbyterian minister. He received his doctorate from the King’s College, London, a constituent college of the University of London where he wrote his dissertation on "Prophetism in Ghana."

== Career ==
=== Church ministry ===
He was ordained a church minister in 1936. He was a participant at the 1938 International Missionary Council (IMC) meeting held in Tambaram, India. He was elected the Synod Clerk of the Evangelical Presbyterian Church of the Gold Coast, serving from 1945 to 1949. Baëta chaired both the Ghana Christian Council and the Ghana Church Union Negotiations Committee. In 1958, he was elected the vice-chairman of the IMC in 1958 and oversaw the merger of the World Council of Churches (WCC) and the IMC. He was a member of the Bible Society of Ghana and helped translate the Holy Bible into the Ewe language. Christian Baëta was a member of a number of committees: the Anglican-Reformed Commission on Church Unity, the Central and Executive Committees of the WCC and the Commission of the Churches on International Affairs.

=== Academia ===
Christian G. K. Baëta

Christian Baëta joined the faculty at the department of divinity and the study of religions at the University of Ghana, Legon, retiring in 1971 as a professor. During his time at Legon, through his initiative, the focus of the department shifted from an emphasis on Christian theology to the Study of religions in general and its theological link to an increasingly globalized world. At the university, Baëta taught Old Testatment, Hebrew, African Religions and Islam. From 1965 to 1971, he was also the Henry W. Luce Visiting Professor at Selly Oak Colleges in Birmingham, England. An advocate of missiology as a local phenomenon, he championed the role of younger African church missions, focusing on common experiences and co-existing peacefully with adherents of other faiths while maintaining the free expression of ecumenical Christianity. In his view, the two philosophies were connected through a shared belief in the sovereignty of a supreme being.

==== Higher education fundraising ====
He played a prominent role in raising funds for the establishment of the country’s first university, the University of Ghana, then known as the University College of the Gold Coast. Through his efforts, an initial capital of £897,000 was raised from donations by cocoa farmers, represented by the Cocoa Marketing Board, now known as Cocobod. Other important groups that petitioned the colonial government between December 1945 and July 1946, to establish a university, include the Advisory Committee on Education, the Achimota Council, the Standing Committee of the Joint Provincial Council of Chiefs, the Asante Confederacy Council, the Gold Coast Bar Association, the Old Students Associations, the Rodger Club, Accra; the Hudson Club, Kumasi; and the Gold Coast Teachers Union. The Bradley Committee kicked off the motion through deliberation and subsequent legislation to establish the university. The chieftain of Ashanti, the Asantehene, accepted the recommendation of the committee to have the nation's premier university constructed in Accra using financial assistance from farmers whose farms were located in the Ashanti jurisdiction, contingent on the establishment of another university in Kumasi which came to fruition in 1952 when the Kumasi College of Technology, now known as the Kwame Nkrumah University of Science and Technology was opened.

=== Public service ===
Christian Baëta had a foray into legislative politics. He was a member of the Gold Coast Legislative Council from 1946 to 1950. An advocate of social justice and conflict resolution, he served on the Coussey Committee on Constitutional Reform for the Gold Coast and was a member of the Constitutional Assembly which carried out the groundwork for the return to civilian rule after the 1966 overthrow of Kwame Nkrumah in a coup d’état. He served as the President of the Ghana Academy of Arts and Sciences.

== Selected works ==
- Baëta, C. G. K. (1963) "Prophetism in Ghana" London
- Baëta, C. G. K. (1968) "Christianity in Tropical Africa"
- Baëta, C. G. K. (1971) "The Relationship of Christians with Men of Other Living Faiths"
- Baëta, C. G. K. (1984) "My Pilgrimage in Mission," IBMR 12 (4): 165-168.

== Personal life ==
He was married to Victoria Essie van Lare (born in 1908) who died on 6 September 1999 and they had 5 children.

== Death ==
Christian Baëta died in 1994 at the age of eighty-six.

== Bibliography ==
- Pobee, J. S. (1976), "Religion in a Pluralistic Society: Essays in Honour of Prof. C.G. Baeta" ISBN 9004045562, 9789004045569
- Ringwald, W. (1963), "Christian Baeta Fuhrender Christ seiner Afrikanischen Kirche," in "Ökumenische Profile Brückenbauer der Einen Kirche II," Gunter Gloede
- Sudermeier, T. (1982) "Auf dem Weg zu einer Afrikanischen Kirche, Christian G. Baeta, Ghana," in Theologen der Dritten Welt
