= Evangelical Presbyterian Church of Togo =

The Evangelical Presbyterian Church of Togo is a church of the Bremen Mission, which began its work in the Volta region in Ghana. The first congregation was established in 1893. The church was established at the end of the 19th century. At the time of World War I, the church had 22,000 members. After the departure of the German missionaries, the church sought to maintain its unity, and in 1922 the Evangelical Ewe Church was established, uniting the francophone and anglophone churches. The French-speaking church was established by the Paris Foreign Missions Society.

The new evangelisation resulted in the founding of several hospitals, dispensaries, and schools. In 1959 the United Church of Christ in the United States started its own mission work in North Togo. In the same year, the church gained full independence, and one year later the country became independent. In 1965 it faced the dictatorship in Togo. The church began mission work in the north west of the country in 1984.

The church has 200,000–300,000 members, 516 congregations, and 516 house fellowships. The church affirms the Apostles Creed. It is a member of the World Communion of Reformed Churches.
