= Seth Senyo Agidi =

Ghanaian Presbyterian minister (1955–2020)

The Very Reverend Seth Senyo Agidi
- Born: 1955
- Died: 10 October 2020 (aged 64–65); Ho
- Education: Trinity Theological Seminary, Legon; Eden Theological Seminary
- Occupation: Priest
- Employer: Evangelical Presbyterian Church, Ghana
- Title: Moderator of the General Assembly of Evangelical Presbyterian Church
- Term: 2015 - 2020
- Predecessor: Very Rev. Francis Amenu
- Successor: Bliss Divine Kofi Agbeko

Seth Senyo Agidi (1955–2020) was the Moderator of the General Assembly of the Evangelical Presbyterian Church, Ghana (E.P. Church) until his death in October 2020.

== Education ==
Agidi trained as a teacher. He later attended the Trinity Theological Seminary, Legon which is affiliated to the University of Ghana. He also pursued postgraduate studies at the Eden Theological Seminary, United States of America.

== Christian ministry ==
Agidi was once the district Pastor at Peki in the Volta Region, Sekondi-Takoradi. He also served in the same capacity in various districts in the Western Region, Ghana. He was also the principal of the E.P. Theological Seminary at Peki.

Prior to his appointment as moderator of the General Assembly, he was serving on various boards such as the E.P. University Council, E. P. Theological Seminary. He was also a member of the International Missionary Organisations. He was also the founder and president of Shepherd Centre of the Aged, a non-governmental organisation affiliated to the church. His last position before becoming the Moderator was Director of Programmes, Ecumenical and Social Relations of the Evangelical Presbyterian Church, Ghana. Agidi served in this role until his death in October 2020.

== Personal life ==
Agidi was married with four children.

== Death ==
Agidi was admitted to the Ho Teaching Hospital following a short illness and died on 10 October 2020. The day before his death, he had spoken at a press conference where he had spoken against the activities of the Western Togoland Movement, a separatist movement in the Volta Region of Ghana.

== See also ==
- Evangelical Presbyterian Church, Ghana

Religious titles
Preceded by Francis Amenu	Moderator of the General Assembly of the Evangelical Presbyterian Church, Ghana; 2015 - 2020	Succeeded by Bliss Agbeko
