= Evangelical Presbyterian University College =

- Collège universitaire évangélique presbytérien Nyanyuigblɔlawo ƒe Presbyteria Yunivɛsiti Kɔledzi
- Type: Private
- Established: 2008; 18 years ago
- Affiliations: University of Cape Coast; Eden Theological Seminary
- Principal: Rev. Dr. Cyril G. K. Fayose
- Location: Ho and Peki, Volta Region, Ghana; 6.60945815°N 0.47053687°E
- Website: http://www.epuc.edu.gh/
- Location in Ghana

The Evangelical Presbyterian University College was established in 2008 by the Evangelical Presbyterian Church, Ghana.

== Campuses ==
There are two campuses. The first is the Central Municipal Campus located at Ho, capital of the Volta Region of Ghana. The other is the Greenhill Campus, located at Peki in the South Dayi District of the Volta Region.

== Programmes ==
It currently has programmes organised by the School of Business and the School of Theology.

- B.SC Business Administration (Credit Management & Finance)
- BA Social and Community Development Studies
- B.Sc Business Administration (Marketing)
- BSc. Integrated Development Studies
- BSc Business Administration (HR)
- BA (Hons) Pastoral Ministry and Church Management
- BA Corporate Secretaryship and Management
- B. Sc. Agribusiness
- BSc. (Hons) Business Administration (Accounting and Finance)
- B.SC. Animal Science And Fisheries
- B.Sc. Crop And Soil Sciences
- B. ED. (Arts)
- B. ED. Basic Education
- B.A. English
