= Evangelical Presbyterian Church, Ghana =

Religious denomination

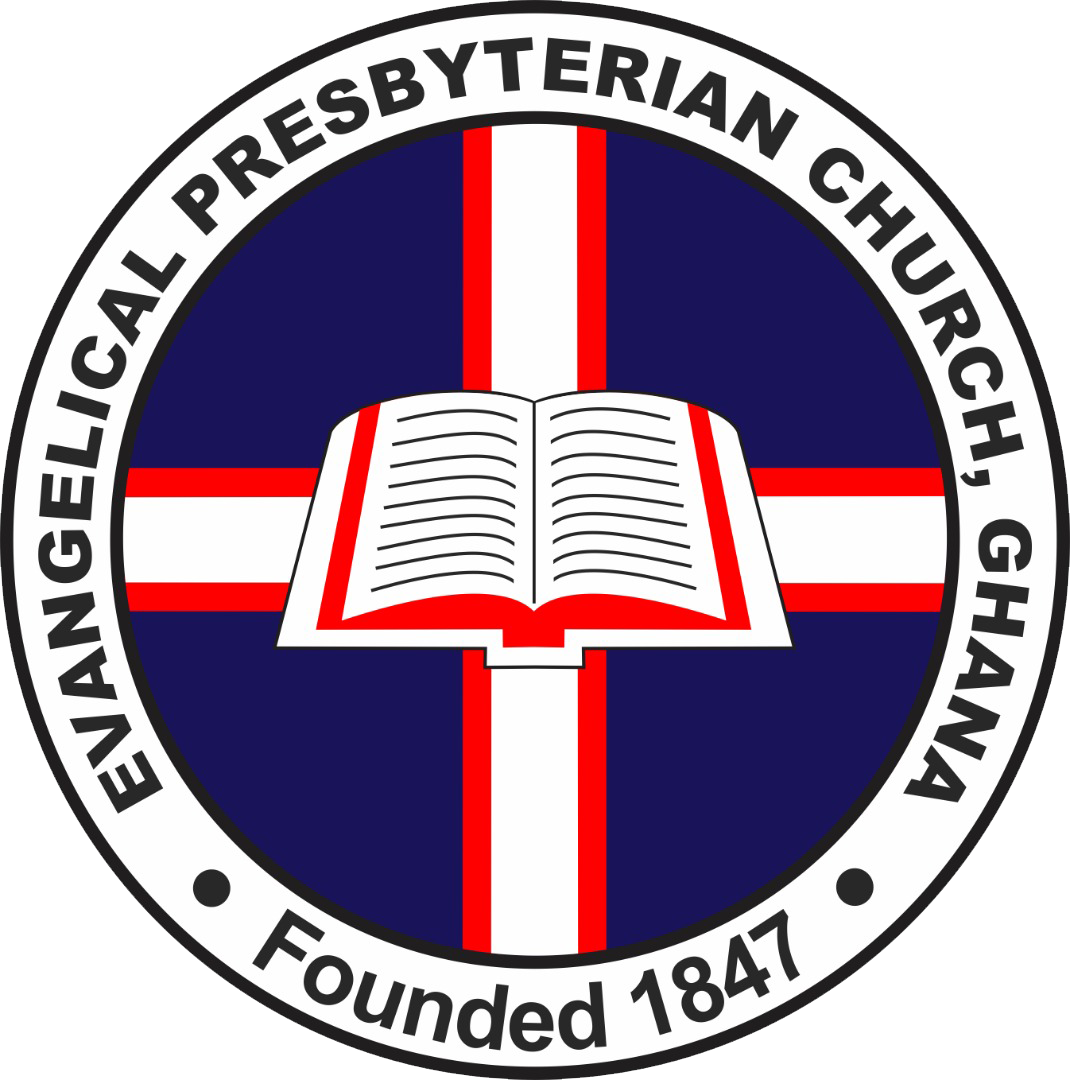
- Evangelical Presbyterian Church, Ghana logo
- Classification: Protestant
- Orientation: Presbyterian
- Scripture: Protestant Bible
- Theology: Evangelical; Reformed
- Polity: Presbyterian
- Associations: World Council of Churches; All Africa Conference of Churches; World Alliance of Reformed Churches; World Communion of Reformed Churches; Christian Council of Ghana
- Region: Ghana
- Origin: 14 November 1847; 178 years ago
- Congregations: 748
- Members: 600,000
- Official website: www.epchurchghana.org

The Evangelical Presbyterian Church, Ghana (Ewe: Presbyteria Nyanyui Hame le Ghana, colloquially EP Church), is a mainline Protestant Christian denomination in Ghana. It has strong roots in the Evangelical and Reformed traditions. The denomination’s Presbyterian sister church is the Presbyterian Church of Ghana.

== History ==
The Evangelical Presbyterian Church, Ghana was founded by German missionaries on 14 November 1847 in Peki. These missionaries from the North German Mission Society (Norddeutsche Mission, Bremen), together with the Basel Mission in 1847, started work among the Ewe people in what is now the Volta Region of Ghana. By the beginning of World War I, they had established two mission stations in the British colony of the Gold Coast and seven in the German protectorate of Togoland. The first of the mission stations was Mission-Tove in present-day Togo.

After the war, the League of Nations partitioned Togoland, the western area becoming British Transvolta Togoland, and the eastern section becoming French Togoland (now Togo). Despite this division, the first synod of the mission stations in May 1922 declared itself to be the supreme governing body of the “Ewe Church”, and adopted the congregational order of the Bremen Mission. In 1923, Scottish missionaries began working in British Togoland, with the church in French Togoland run by the Paris Mission.

As a result, development proceeded separately in the two territories, while sharing the same constitution. They hold a common synod every four years.

== Governance ==
=== Moderator of the General Assembly ===
The overall leader of the church is known as the Moderator of the General Assembly. The current Moderator is Reverend Lt. Colonel Bliss Divine Kofi Agbeko. He was inducted in January 2021 at the Dela Chapel of the church at Ho.

=== Past Moderators of the General Synod ===
The previous gathering of the churches was known as the General Synod. The first Moderator was elected in 1922, when the Togo and Gold Coast branches of the church held their first Joint Synod. The last Moderator of the General Synod was Rt. Rev. Dr. L.K Buama, whose term ended in 2009.

- Very Rev. Andreas Aku - (1922)
- Very Rev. David Bensah (1923 – 1926)
- Very Rev. E. Awuma (1927 – 1939)
- Very Rev. B.S. Amegashie (1940 – 1951)
- Very Rev. M.W. Akama (1952 – 1956)
- Very Rev. E.K. Galevo (1957 – 1968)
- Very Rev. A.K. Abutiate (1969 – 1972)
- Very Rev. C.K. Dovlo (1969 – 1972)
- Very Rev. Noah Komla Dzobo (1981 – 1993)
- Very Rev. Japhet Ledo (1993 – 2001)
- Very Rev. Livingstone Komla Buama (2001 – 2009)

=== Past Moderators of the General Assembly ===
Since 23 August 2008, the church changed from Synod status to General Assembly status. Since then, the Moderator is now officially known as 'The Moderator of the General Assembly'. The first Moderator since this change was the Very Reverend Francis Amenu. Rev. Seth Agidi, who succeeded him, died in office after a short illness at the Ho Teaching Hospital on 10 October 2020.

- Very Rev. Francis Amenu (2009 – 2015)
- Very Rev. Seth Senyo Agidi (2015 – 2020) Rev. Emmanuel Attu acted as the Moderator for the last two months of Rev. Agidi's term.

=== Past Synod Clerks ===
- Rev. Prof. Christian Gonçalves Kwami Baëta (1945–1949)
- Rev. E.Y. Forson (1960 - 1980)

== Education ==
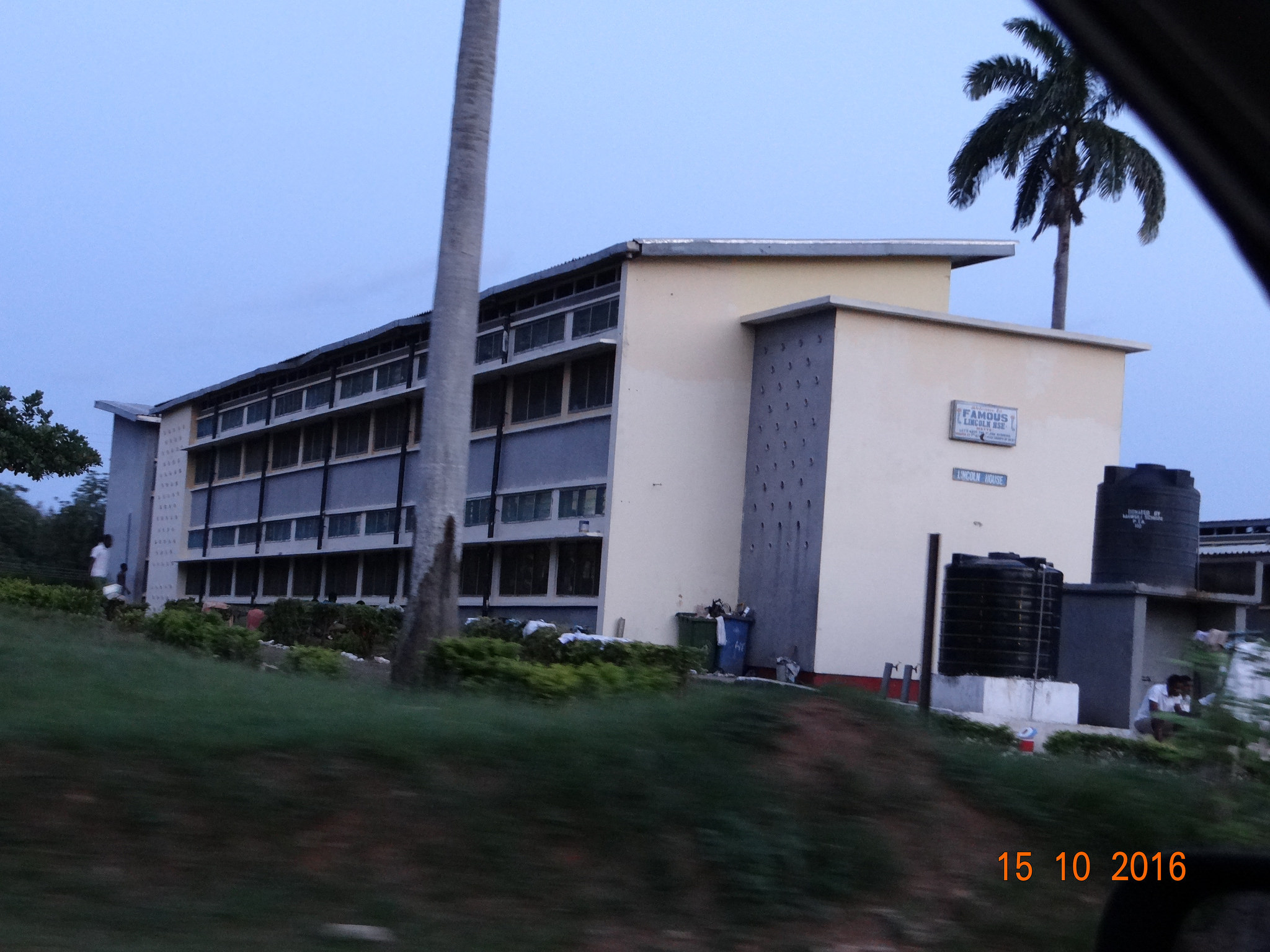
Lincoln House at Mawuli School

The church is active in education and has established numerous primary and secondary schools, and a university college. They include:

- Evangelical Presbyterian University College established in 2008

Central Municipal Campus, Ho and the Greenhills Campus at Peki, both in the Volta Region

- E. P. Church Seminary, Peki was the first institution established by the church in 1864.
- E. P. College of Education, Amedzofe, the first teacher training college to be established in 1946
- E.P. College of Education, Bimbilla
- E.P. College of Education, Dzodze
- Mawuli School, Ho, set up by Mr. and Mrs. Trosts, missionaries sent by the United Church of Christ.
- Mawuko Girls Senior High School also at Ho.
- E. P. Senior High School at Hohoe.
- E. P. Senior High School, Saboba
- E. P. Agric. Senior High School, Tatale
- E. P. Technical Vocational Institute, Alavanyo
- E. P. Church Activity Centre, Ho

== Health ==
The EP Church has also been active in providing health care. Its facilities include:

- E. P. Church Hospital, Adidome
- E. P. Church Hospital, Worawora
- E. P. Church Clinic, Wapuli
- E. P. Static Clinic, Ho
- Dan Moser Memorial Clinic, Dambai
- E. P. Church Clinic, Hatorgodo
- E. P. Church Clinic, Dzemeni
- E. P. Church Clinic, Bladjai
- E. P. Church Clinic, Kpalba-Saboba
- E. P. Church Pharmacy, Ho
- E. P. Church IHDN Hospital, Agbozume
- E. P. Church Nazareth Healing Complex, Vane, Avatime

== Associations ==
- Christian Council of Ghana - member
- World Communion of Reformed Churches - member

== Missionaries ==
One of the last missionaries to work with the Presbyterian church was Ian Strachan of the Church of Scotland. He was also the first headmaster of the E. P. Senior High School at Hohoe.

== Partner churches ==
- Eglise Évangélique Presbytérienne du Togo
- Church of Scotland
- Evangelical Church of Bremen
- Presbyterian Church of Korea (TongHap)
- United Reformed Church - A Ghanaian minister for London (formerly Ghanaian chaplain) works with the URC over four-year term and the church of origin alternates between the Evangelical Presbyterian Church and the Presbyterian Church of Ghana.

== See also ==
- Religion in Ghana
- Christianity in Ghana
- Presbyterian Church of Ghana
- North German Missionary Society (Bremen Mission)

== External links and sources ==
- Official Website
- Presbyteria Nyanyui Hame le Ghana
- Eglise évangélique presbytérienne du Togo
- Information about Evangelical Presbyterian Church, Ghana
- Global Ministries of the Christian Church (Disciples of Christ) and the United Church of Christ
- News from the Ecumenical Committee (United Reformed Church)
