= Ian Strachan (minister) =

- Occupations: Priest; Educationist
- Known for: Missionary work in Ghana; 1st Headmaster of Hohoe Secondary School
- Spouse: Moyer
- Religion: Christianity
- Church: Church of Scotland
- Title: Reverend

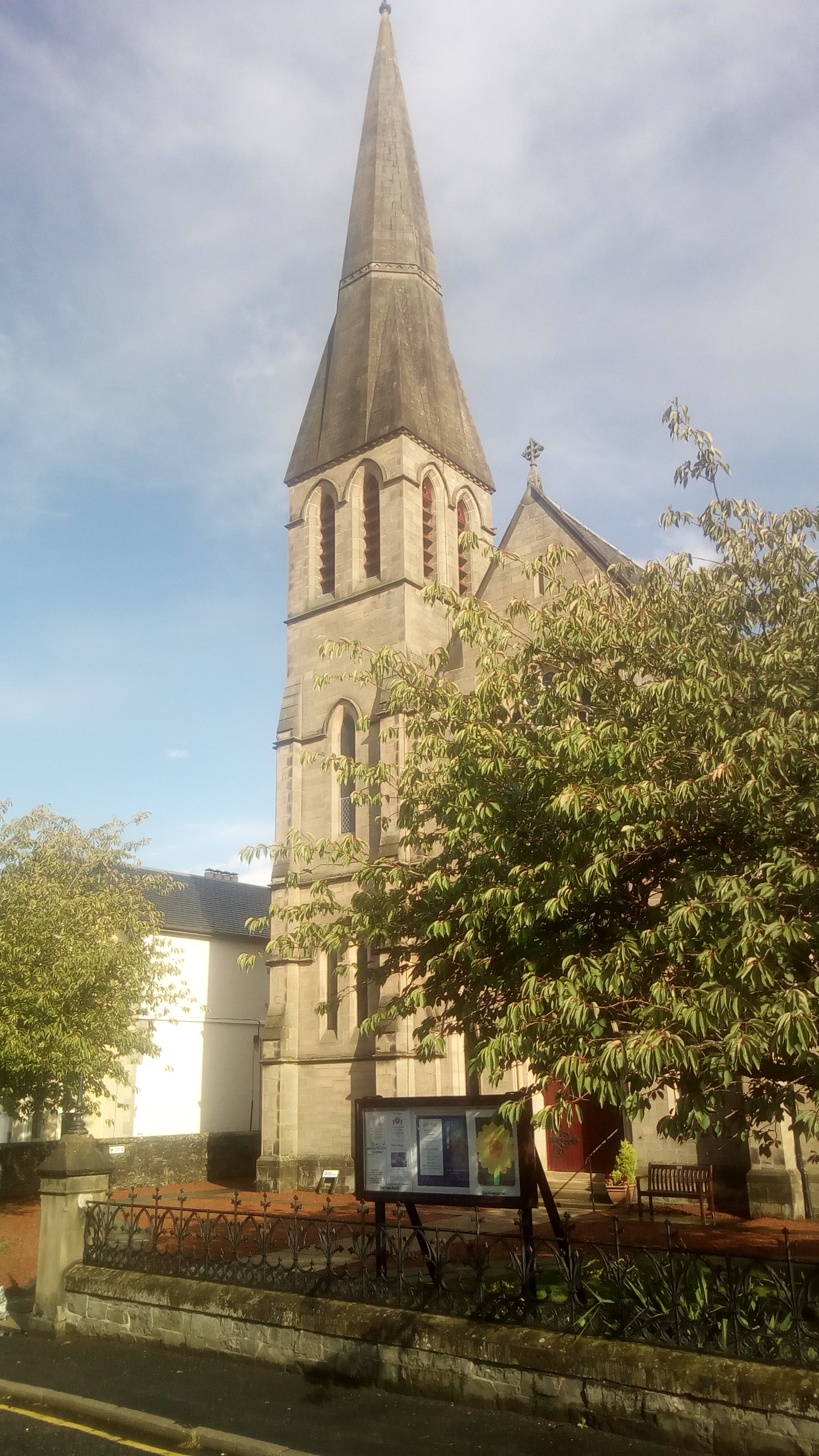
Selkirk Parish Church

Ian Strachan is a retired minister from Aberdeen, Scotland in the United Kingdom. He served with the Church of Scotland. He is reported to be the last Scottish missionary in Ghana. He worked with the Evangelical Presbyterian Church, Ghana.

He travelled with his wife Moyer to Ghana in 1959 as a Youth Worker of the Church of Scotland. In 1961, the Hohoe Secondary School was established in the Volta Region and he became its first Headmaster in September 1961.

He was the minister in charge of the Selkirk Parish Church in Selkirk, Scottish Borders in Scotland between 1987 and 1994.

Ian Strachan spoke in the Ewe language when he was invited to the celebration of the anniversary of the London branch of the Evangelical Presbyterian Church at East Dulwich.

== See also ==
- Church of Scotland
- Evangelical Presbyterian Church, Ghana
