= J. K. Acquaye =

Ghanaian academic and haematologist

Joseph Kpakpo Acquaye OV, FWACP
- Born: Joseph Kpakpo Acquaye; December 1, 1940; Accra, Gold Coast (now Ghana)
- Education: Accra Academy; Tamale Senior High School; University of Ibadan; St George's, University of London (University of London); Royal Postgraduate Medical School (now Imperial College School of Medicine)
- Occupations: Professor, physician
- Known for
- Scientific career
- Fields: Haematology
- Workplaces: University of Ghana Medical School

Joseph Kpakpo Acquaye,OV, FWACP is a Ghanaian physician and academic. He is a clinical haematologist, and a professor of Haematology at the University of Ghana Medical School. Acquaye served as the head of the Haematology department of the University of Ghana Medical School from 1988 to 1990 and also 1994 to 2002, and was the president of the West African College of Physicians from 2003 to 2004. He has served as Director of the National Blood Transfusion Service and also Administrator of the Korle-Bu Teaching Hospital.

== Early life education ==
Acquaye was born in Accra Ghana, on December 1, 1940. He attended Accra United Primary School and James Town Methodist Middle Mixed School for his basic school education and later went to Accra Academy and Tamale Senior High School (then Government Secondary School) in Tamale for his secondary education from 1954 to 1960. He then studied at the University of Ibadan from 1961 to 1966, where he obtained MB, BS degrees. He completed his housemanship at Korle-Bu Teaching Hospital (KBTH) from October 1966 to October 1967 and his residency training at KBTH, St. Georges Hospital in Hyde Park Corner, the Royal Infirmary Huddersfield, and the Royal Postgraduate Hospital in Hammersmith, where he obtained a Diploma in Clinical Pathology. In March 1981 to December 1981, he underwent training in blood transfusion at the East Anglian Blood Transfusion Centre in England.

== Career ==
Acquaye worked for the Ministry of Health in various capacities from November 1967 to February 1997. He served as a Medical Officer, Senior Medical Officer, and Specialist at Korle-Bu Teaching Hospital (KBTH), Cape Coast, Saltpond, Tamale hospitals, and the National Blood Transfusion Service. As the pioneer Pathologist at Tamale, he was responsible for setting up and training the staff in a newly constructed Regional Hospital from 1974 to 1981. He then worked as a Haematology Specialist at the King Abdulaziz University Teaching Hospital from 1982 to 1985, where he published five papers in four years on haemoglobinopathies with the Haematology research team. This experience marked the beginning of his teaching career and involvement in curriculum development.

Acquaye returned to KBTH campus in June 1986 and was posted to the National Blood Transfusion Service (NBTS), of which he became the head towards the end of that year. He remained in that post until he voluntarily retired in 1997. During his time at NBTS, he was actively involved in addressing issues related to blood transfusion safety and blood group antigens. He provided locally made blood grouping reagents free of charge to Ministry of Health hospitals due to lack of availability of commercial blood grouping sera, and this became the focus of his initial research, resulting in the publication of two papers. He also worked towards improving blood transfusion practices and equipment, such as advocating for the purchase of colorimeters and blood bank refrigerators, and addressing issues of pre- and post-transfusion hemoglobin estimation.

In addition to his work at NBTS, Acquaye was appointed as the Medical Administrator (now designated CEO) of KBTH in 1987, in addition to being the head of NBTS. He formed a committee of heads of departments to constitute the policy-making body of the hospital, which facilitated management and decision-making. Some of the landmark decisions taken during his tenure included ending the annual strike action of housemen by making them sign tenancy agreements, developing an objective format for the assessment of house officers in collaboration with Professor Joe Oliver-Commey (which later became the format used by the Medical and Dental Council), and obtaining financial autonomy for KBTH, freeing it from the control of the Ministry of Health.

In 1987, Acquaye joined the University of Ghana Medical School (UGMS) as a part-time Senior Lecturer in Haematology, a position he held until 1997 when he became a full-time Associate Professor. He served in various capacities within UGMS, including acting head and later substantive head of the Haematology Department, as well as serving on numerous committees and writing curricula for the department and Medical Laboratory Technology. Acquaye served as Chairman of the Committee that formulated modalities for income generating activities at UGMS and oversaw its implementation for two years. He has also chaired committees on functions and management of the Radiation Oncology unit and awards categorization for the 50th anniversary celebration of UGMS. Acquaye has also been involved in curriculum development, securing clinic time, and advocating for care giver hospitality in the Haematology Department. He has supervised the dissertation of candidates for the West African College of Physicians and played a significant role in the Ghana Medical Association (GMA) as Chairman of the Continuing Medical Education Committee, leading initiatives to organize symposia and contribute to job description development for doctors.

Acquaye was first appointed head of the department of Haematology in 1988, serving for two years. He combined his university role with being head of the National Blood Transfusion Service. In 1994, he was re-appointed head of the Haematology department of the University of Ghana Medical School. He served in this capacity until 2002. A year later, he was made president of the West African College of Physicians.

== Honours ==
Acquaye has been recognised and honored for his contributions in the field of medicine. He was awarded the Member of the Order of the Volta by the State in 2016 for his contribution to the socioeconomic development of Ghana. He received a Gold Medal from the West African College of Physicians, and had the Conference Hall of the National Blood Service headquarters named in his honour as the "Professor Joseph Kpakpo Acquaye Conference Hall" in 2018 for his contribution to blood donation in Ghana.
