= Hutton Ayikwei Addy =

Ghanaian academic and physician (1930–1996)

Hutton Ayikwei Addy FWACP
- Born: 26 November 1930; Accra, Gold Coast
- Died: 1996
- Occupations: Academic; Physician
- Spouses: Jacoba Jemima Addy (née Evans-Lutterodt); Ernestine A. Addy (née Gyebi-Ofosu)
- Children: 5

Academic background
- Education: Accra Academy
- Alma mater: University of Ghana; Queen's University Belfast; UCL Great Ormond Street Institute of Child Health, University College, London; London School of Hygiene & Tropical Medicine; University of California, Los Angeles

Hutton Ayikwei Addy, FWACP was a Ghanaian academic and physician (paediatrician). He was a founding member of the School of Medical Sciences (now a constituent faculty of the College of Health Sciences) of the Kwame Nkrumah University of Science and Technology, and a founding member and first dean of the School of Medicine and Health Sciences of the University for Development Studies.

== Early life and education ==
Addy was born on 26 November 1930 in Accra, Ghana (then Gold Coast). He attended Government Boys' School in Accra from 1936 to 1945, and gained admission to study at the Accra Academy a year later. At the Accra Academy, he was a contemporary of Emmanuel Noi Omaboe (Ghana's first statistician) and J. F. O. Mustaffah (First Ghanaian Neurosurgeon), with whom he shared honours with in Mathematics and Additional Mathematics. Addy graduated the Accra Academy in 1950, and in 1951, enrolled at the University College of the Gold Coast (now the University of Ghana). There, he studied from 1951 to 1954 and proceeded to Queen's University, Belfast. At Queen's University, Addy studied from 1954 until 1959 when he qualified as a trained physician. In 1964, he entered the Institute of Child Health for a one-year diploma program. In 1965, he obtained a Diploma in Child Health. From January 1967 to July 1967, Addy studied at the London School of Tropical Medicine and Hygiene, England, and was awarded a Diploma in Tropical Medicine and Hygiene. He later pursued a one-year programme at the University of California, Los Angeles, from 1973 to 1974.

== Career ==
Two years after graduating Queen's University, Belfast, Addy joined the Korle-Bu Hospital staff as a medical officer. He worked at the hospital until 1964 when he left for the United Kingdom for further studies at the Institute of Child Health. From 1970 to 1973, he worked as a senior medical officer at the Princess Marie Louise Hospital in Accra. He left for further studies once again at the University of California, Los Angeles from 1973 to 1974, and upon his return, he gained employment at the Nutrition Division of the Ministry of Health as a senior medical officer. In April 1976, he was elevated to the position of a principal medical officer.

Later in 1976, Addy was appointed senior lecturer of the School of Medical Sciences, Kwame Nkrumah University of Science and Technology (then the University of Science and Technology, Kumasi) as a founding academic staff of the school, and in 1982, he was appointed associate professor and head of the department of Community Health, School of Medical Sciences. Addy later joined the University for Development Studies as a founding academic staff of the university's Medical School and went on to serve as the first Dean of the Medical School.

As an academic and physician, Addy served on various committees and associations. He was a member of the Ghana Medical Association, a Fellow of the West African College of Physicians, a member of the International Union of Nutritional Sciences, and a member of the Protein-Energy Malnutrition Committee. He was a commonwealth visiting professor of Dalhousie University, Halifax, Nova Scotia, Canada, from 1986 to 1987 and in 1990, and a senior fellow at the Fester Pearson Institute, Dalhousie University, Halifax from 1986 to 1987 and in 1990. He was a visiting fellow of the Caribbean Epidemiology Centre, Port of Spain, Trinidad and Tobago, and a consultant for UNICEF from 1989 to 1990. He was a member of Council of the Ghana Medical Association in 1990, a member of the National Planning Committee of the School of Medical Sciences, University Science and Technology, Kumasi from 1977 to 1980. He was also on the Sectoral Technical Committee on Health and Medicine, and became a member of the Ghana Academy of Arts and Sciences from 1988 to 1989. In 1989, he became a member of the Management Board, Lowcost human waste management project, UNDP/World Bank programme in Ghana.

== Personal life, legacy and death ==
Addy married Jacoba Jemima Evans-Lutterodt in 1961. Together, they had five children; two daughters and three sons. His hobbies were literature, music and comparative religion.

The prize for the best graduating student at the Department of Community Health at the Kwame Nkrumah University of Science and Technology School of Medical Sciences is named in his honour. He died in 1996 at the age of 66.
