= Nii Otu Nartey =

Ghanaian dental surgeon

Nii Otu Nartey FAAOP, MRCD, FWACS, FGCS
- Born: Nii Otu Nartey; 2 December 1952 (age 73)
- Education: Accra Academy; Achimota School
- Alma mater: University of Ghana
- Occupations: Oral Pathologist; Academic
- Known for: CEO of Korle Bu Hospital
- Scientific career
- Fields: Dental Surgery
- Workplaces: University of Ghana Medical School; Korle-Bu Teaching Hospital

Nii Otu Nartey is a Ghanaian dental surgeon and a professor of oral pathology at the University of Ghana Dental School. He became chief administrator of Korle-Bu Teaching Hospital in 2008 and served until 2013. Prior to this, he was the first dean of the dental school of the College of Health Sciences of the University of Ghana.

He is a Fellow of the American Academy of Orthotists and Prosthetists, Member of the Royal College of Dentists of Canada, Fellow of the West African College of Surgeons and a Fellow of the Ghana College of Surgeons.

== Early life ==
Nartey was born on 2 December 1952. Nartey attended Achimota School and Accra Academy. After his secondary education, Nartey graduated with a bachelor's degree in dentistry from the University of Ghana Medical School in 1980. Nartey had postgraduate training in oral pathology at the Schulich School of Medicine and Dentistry of the Western University between 1983 and 1986.

== Career ==
=== Academic ===
In August 1994, he joined the then School of Medicine and Dentistry of the University of Ghana as a lecturer. Nartey was promoted to associate professor at the department of Oral Pathology and Oral Medicine and served as deputy dean of the University of Ghana School of Medicine and Dentistry. He was appointed acting dean upon the separation of the School of Dentistry from the University of Ghana Medical School as a new school of the university. Thereby, becoming the first dean of the University of Ghana Dental School.

=== CEO of Korle-Bu Hospital ===
In June 2008, Nartey was appointed Chief Administrator of the Korle-Bu Teaching Hospital. In July 2009, he began the distributing of land to hospital staff which previously had resulted in the hospital staff taking a lawsuit against the hospital. The next month, he ordered the suspension of 11 revenue collectors of the hospital on grounds of embezzlement.

In January 2010, Nartey outlined plans for clinics for treatment of stroke and cancer. However, it was not until 2011 that Nartey revealed work was to begin on the expansion and re-equipment of the National Radiotherapy Centre meant for cancer treatment. Under Nartey's leadership, the lifts of the hospital were replaced.

In January 2012, media outlet, myjoyonline reported on a rift between the hospital board and the Nartey-led management. Hospital's workers followed up with a demand for his removal by the country's president citing corruption as their reason. The next month, Nartey objected to a proposal made by the health minister, Alban Bagbin for a dissolution of the hospital's board.

In March 2012, Nartey made comments suggesting that the hospital should be subjected to private control to raise money and for efficient operation. In April and May 2012, workers of the hospital again demanded his removal by the country's president citing their reasons as corruption and his call on privatisation of the hospital.

In September 2012, Nartey decision to break into the hospital's pharmacy in order to dispense drugs to patients under emergency met with criticism from the pharmacists association, whose members were on strike, as being illegal.

On 17 December 2012, Nartey announced his retirement from Korle-Bu revealing that the hospital board had appointed the hospital's Director of Medical Affairs, Afua Hesse, to succeed him. He went on a leave the next month and his retirement took effect from May 2013.

== Personal life ==
Nii Otu is married to Merley Afua Newman-Nartey, an academic at the department of Orthodontics and Pedodontics of the University of Ghana Dental School. Nii Otu and Merley have two children.
