= J. F. O. Mustaffah =

Ghanaian academic and first Ghanaian neurosurgeon

J. F. O. Mustaffah FRCS, FICS
- Born: James Franklin Osman Adewale Ishola Mustaffah; Ghana (then Gold Coast)
- Died: 8 March 1997; Ghana
- Education: Accra Academy
- Alma mater: University of London
- Occupations: Neurosurgeon; Academic
- Known for: First Ghanaian neurosurgeon
- Scientific career
- Fields: Neurosurgery
- Workplaces: University of Ghana Medical School; Korle-Bu Teaching Hospital; National Hospital for Neurology and Neurosurgery; Guy's Hospital

James Franklin Osman Adewale Ishola Mustaffah, FRCS, FICS (died 8 March 1997) was a Ghanaian academic and neurosurgeon. He is credited for introducing neurosurgery in Ghana. Mustaffah was one of the earliest African neurosurgeons practising in Sub-Saharan Africa, he was the first African member of the International Society of Surgeons. He was a member of the African Association of Neurological Science and a faculty member of the University of Ghana Medical School.

== Early life and education ==
Mustaffah studied at the local Roman Catholic School in Aboso, where he was classmates with actor Bob Cole and musician Michael Amissah. He had his secondary education at the Accra Academy where he was the head prefect for the 1950 academic year. He then proceeded to the United Kingdom to study at the University of London graduating with his bachelor of medicine and bachelor of surgery certificate; MB, BS (London) in 1960. He also sat for, and obtained the Licentiate of the Royal College of Physicians of London and the Membership of the Royal College of Surgeons of England in 1960.

== Career ==
From 1964 to 1968, Mustaffah trained in London hospitals including the National Hospital for Nervous Diseases, and Guy's Hospital. In 1968 he became a Fellow of the Royal College of Surgeons of England. He returned to Ghana in October 1969 to formally introduce Neurosurgery in Ghana at the Korle-Bu Teaching Hospital. His department at the Korle-Bu Teaching Hospital then became an integral part of the Surgery department of the University of Ghana Medical School.

He was one of the founding fathers of the Pan African Association of Neurological Sciences (PAANS). He was president of the association from 1988 to 1990. He also served as chief of neurosurgery at the National Neurosurgical Centre of the Ghana Medical School.

== Ban ==
In 1989, Mustaffah was banned from using all Ministry of Health facilities. According to Nana Akuoko Sarpong, the then Minister for Health, the University of Ghana based on reports from agents of the Ministry of Health had laid serious charges of misconduct against him. It was alleged that Mustaffah had once prevented agents of the Ministry of Health from entering certain wards, "and had kept patients who are virtual vegetables on wards for 10-15 years when there is pressure on hospital space." In a further investigation, it was revealed that Dr. Mustaffah allegedly gave out false reports in support of insurance claims in America, and also indulged in occultic practices in his medical practice. These claims were strongly denied by Mustaffah. Dr. Fitz-Williams, a Soviet-trained cardiothoracic surgeon at the hospital at the time, described the allegations questioning the competence of Dr. Mustaffah as funny.

Following these allegations and dismissal, the Ghana Medical Association begun investigation into the matter. The then president of the association, Professor Harold H. Phillips claimed that the association was aware that three doctors (Dr. Mustaffah, Dr. Fitz-Williams, and Dr. Boakye-Danquah) had had problems with their employers (the ministry), however, no official complaint had been made to the association.

Dr. Mustaffah in his defence claimed that he had only "objected to doctors doing rounds on his patients without his consent". On allegations of him using the CSR to forcibly dismiss his patients; he said he only had one patient with a spine problem who had been in the ward for 15 years due to inadequate rehabilitation facilities in the hospital. On the issue of insurance, he added that, he had engaged just one insurance company in America. A case which had been investigated by a government committee and a subsequent apology was issued to him following their findings. He added that it was not impossible for an incompetent person to run the neurological ward for over 20 years, and also serve as president of the Pan African Association of Neuro Surgergical Sciences. He described allegations of him practising occultism as nonsense.

== Personal life and death ==
Mustaffah was a muslim and a member of the Ghana Muslim Students Association during his schooling days. He later became a patron of the association. Following his dismissal, Mustaffah was evicted from his bungalow on the campus of the Korle-Bu Teaching Hospital. He remained homeless until his death on 8 March 1997.

== Legacy ==
Mustaffah is credited for introducing Neurosurgery as a medical speciality in Ghana. Being one of the few specialists of his profession in the Sub-Saharan Region, he served not only Ghana but the Sub-Saharan Region for over two decades of his career.

Following Mustaffah's death in 1997, the Ghana Muslim Students Association (GMSA) instituted an annual lecture in his honour for "his immense contribution in the country's health delivery system". The association described him as a professional who helped train many medical doctors at the University of Ghana Medical School, and also "projected the image of Ghanaian doctors abroad." He was described as "the doyen of neurosciences in Ghana" by the Journal of the National Medical Association.
