= Fred T. Sai =

Ghanaian academic and physician (1924–2019)

Frederick Torgbor Sai FRCP(Ed), FWACP, FGA, HonFACOG, HonFRCOG, MSG
- Born: 23 June 1924; Accra, Gold Coast
- Died: 17 September 2019 (aged 95); Accra, Ghana
- Education: Achimota College; University of London (MBChB, DTM&H); Harvard School of Public Health (MPH)
- Known for: Contributions to family medicine and reproductive health Co-founder of the Planned Parenthood Association of Ghana
- Spouse: Florence Dzani (m. 1952)
- Children: 7 (4 biological, including Oboshie; 3 adopted)
- Awards: United Nations Population Award (1993); Prince Mahidol Award (1995); Order of the Star of Ghana (2006)
- Scientific career
- Fields: Public health; Preventive and social medicine
- Institutions: University of Ghana, Legon

Frederick Torgbor Sai, FRCP(Ed), FWACP, FGA, HonFACOG, HonFRCOG, MSG (23 June 1924 – 17 September 2019) was a Ghanaian academic and family health physician who co-founded the Planned Parenthood Association of Ghana in 1967. A gender and reproductive health advocate, he was known for his campaigns and education drawing attention to the food and nutrition problems of Africa, particularly of women and children. He served as the Chief Physician for Nutrition and the Director of Medical Services at the Ghana Health Service and Professor of Community Health at the University of Ghana, Legon. He was also a nutrition advisor to the Food and Agriculture Organisation, Africa Region as well as the coordinator for the World Hunger Programme of the United Nations University and a Senior Population Advisor to the World Bank. He was the President and Honorary Secretary of the Ghana Academy of Arts and Sciences. In professional circles, he was known as the “Godfather or Father of Family Planning” and sometimes as the “Grandfather of Maternal Health”.

== Early life and education ==
Sai was born on 23 June 1924 in the suburb of Osu, Accra in the Gold Coast colony, now modern Ghana. He belonged to the Ga ethnic group of Accra. Sai's father died when he was about three or four years old and he was raised by his mother, Emelia Shormeh Omaboe; an experience that shaped his resolve to focus on "women's issues" in his medical career. He studied at the Presbyterian boys’ boarding middle school, the Salem School, Osu and won a Cadbury scholarship to Achimota College where he completed his secondary education and the pre-clinical course. He then studied medicine (MBChB) at the University of London on a government scholarship, graduating in 1955 with distinguished honours in obstetrics and gynaecology. He received a Diploma in Tropical Medicine and Hygiene (DTM&H) from the same institution in 1956 and held a master's degree in public health, earned in 1960, as a WHO Scholar at Harvard University. In addition, he received postgraduate training in internal medicine at Edinburgh. He returned to his homeland after his medical training in the United Kingdom, in time to be part of the push for independence from Great Britain – a struggle led by Ghana's first leader, Kwame Nkrumah.

== Career ==
In his fifty-year career, Sai advocated for family planning policies in Ghana leading to the provision of subsidized family planning services in public hospitals by the state. Based on Sai's advocacy, in 2007, the Government of John Agyekum Kufuor introduced free maternal health services as an avenue to reduce maternal mortality among adolescent girls and young women. Known in the global community as a champion of women's sexual and reproductive health, he was also an authority on health, nutrition and population. Sai believed that women should have access to medical services in a safe environment.

In his early career as a young doctor, one of his biggest confrontations was with the first President of newly independent Ghana, Kwame Nkrumah. Nkrumah was an advocate of women's rights, and also pioneered population studies in Ghana, and the first full modern population census on the African continent: Ghana's 1960 census. However, Nkrumah was determined to see Ghana's human capital grow and develop as a young country and had reservations about family planning. As a result, he banned the import of contraceptives and other family planning methods. Doctors providing them had to do so secretly. Sai provided contraceptives to women – despite the risks posed by the President's opposition. With the overthrow of Nkrumah in 1966 in a military coup, the ban on contraceptive use was lifted, and Sai began to take a leading role in Ghana's family planning policies and was soon drawn into the international sphere.

The Ghana Health Service (GHS) estimated that in the 2000s that contraception use in the country was at 23 percent even though more than 52 percent of Ghana's population was morally and culturally opposed to contraception use. During this period, the Ghana Health Service noted that Ghana's maternal mortality rate was 350 deaths per 100,000 births falling short of the Sustainable Development Goals target of a reduction of 75 percent to less than 100 deaths per 100,000 deaths. A way to reduce maternal deaths was to reduce the number of pregnancies per woman by using family planning. Sai's counsel to members of the reproductive health and family planning fraternity in Ghana was to seek out the “30 percent unmet need for family planning and push access further.”

In 1967, he co-founded the Planned Parenthood Association of Ghana, previously known as the Ghana Family Planning Association. From 1989 to 1995, he was President of the International Planned Parenthood Federation (IPPF). He has served in many other capacities within that organization including Assistant Secretary-General. He was instrumental in setting up the Africa Regional Office of IPPF as well as the Centre for African Family Studies (CAFS) in Nairobi. His appointment as Senior Advisor on Population to the President of the World Bank from 1985 to 1990 gave him the opportunity to influence and assist several developing countries to integrate population issues into their social and economic development strategies. He held that post after serving as Senior Population Advisor at the World Bank and working with the Food and Agriculture Organization (FAO).

Sai held the Chairmanship for the Main Committees of the last two major UN conferences on population and development: 1984 International Conference on Population in Mexico City and the 1994 International Conference on Population and Development in Cairo. The Vatican challenged the Cairo conference agenda in a letter of opposition. The ICDP produced the Programme of Action, emphasizing “the centrality of women to all development programs and called for world attention to the improvement in the status of women and for equity and equality between the sexes as the basis of all human relationships.”

Sai chaired various other international conferences including the WHO/UNICEF Infant and Young Child Feeding Conference held in Geneva in 1979 which led to the development of the international code on Marketing of Breast Milk Substitutes; Moderator for 1987 Safe Motherhood Conference in Nairobi which launched the Safe Motherhood Initiative and the Women Deliver Conference in London in 2007. As Chairman of these conferences, Sai led the crafting of a consensus and creating an environment in which nations, groups, organization and people with strong and opposing views could state their positions and yet be prepared to respect and even accommodate their differences from the preparatory activities through the negotiations and, finally, to the adoption of international agreements. He was a supporter of the Ghana Mama Ye campaign which aimed at achieving zero maternal and infant deaths, leading to improvements in the lives of disadvantaged, low-income and vulnerable mothers and their newborns.

He served in several positions in the Ghana Health Service, including being Chief Physician for Nutrition and the Director of Medical Services. He was also a pioneering Professor of Preventive and Social Medicine at the University of Ghana Medical School. The author and editor of numerous publications relating to family planning, health and nutrition, Sai was also an advisor to the President and Government of Ghana on Reproductive Health and HIV/AIDS. He played a major role in the development and establishment of various institutions and programs in Ghana, serving at various times as Assistant to the Chief of the Ministry of Health, Director of Medical Services, Chairman of the Medical and Dental Council, Physician Specialist in Human Nutrition, Fellow and later president of the Ghana Academy of Arts and Sciences among other positions. He was instrumental in the establishment of the Ghana Medical Association, the University of Ghana Medical School (UGMS), the National Food and Nutrition Board, the Planned Parenthood Association of Ghana (PPAG) and the first head of the National Population Council among other institutions.

In 1969, F. T. Sai spearheaded the roll-out of the Danfa Reproductive and Community Healthcare Facility in 1969, raising funds from the USAID and the University of California, Los Angeles, which extended family planning and public health services to 60,000 rural dwellers in Ghana.

He served as an external Director of the Ghanaian central bank, the Bank of Ghana and a member of the Board of Directors of several United States-based non-profits working in Sexual and Reproductive Health. He was an Emeritus Member and sat on the boards of Women Deliver and Population Action International and was an honorary guest on the Creative Storm Networks’ Maternal Health Channel Television Series, a program that informed, educated and stimulated interest in maternal health issues around the globe.

His publications also covered the ethical issues in the Sexual and Reproductive Health field. Among his numerous books were “Adam and Eve and the Serpent”, dealing with the inequalities and the difficulties faced by African women; and “Fred Sai Speaks Out” which is a collection of essays on his views of the reproductive health field, including a letter to Pope John Paul II asking for a reconsideration of the Vatican’s anti-contraception and family planning stance. He published his memoirs, With Heart and Voice: Fred Sai Remembers in 2010.

He was a Member (1959) and later Fellow (1964) of the Royal College of Physicians of Edinburgh. He was also a Fellow of the West African College of Physicians (FWACP), elected in 1976.

In 1969, Sai unsuccessfully contested the 1969 parliamentary election in the Osu-Klottey constituency as a candidate of the centre-right Progress Party.

== Personal life ==
Together with his wife, Florence Aleeno Sai, née Dzani who he married in 1952 in London, they raised seven children (four daughters and three sons), three of whom they adopted. One of his children, Florence Oboshie Sai-Cofie, a Ghanaian politician, advertising marketing specialist and media executive, served as a cabinet minister in the John Kufuor administration. He enjoyed playing golf and listening to highlife and jazz music.

== Honours and awards ==
Sai was a recipient of the United Nations Population Award in 1993 for his work in population, reproductive health and nutrition. He was awarded the 1995 Prince Mahidol Award in "recognition of his long-standing involvement and global leadership on international family planning and population issues." With the Prince Mahidol Award, he set up a fund at the University of Ghana, Legon, for women reading science. About fifty students have benefited from this prize. He received Honorary Doctorates from Tufts University (DLitt) and the University of Ghana, Legon (DSc). He was also accorded the Honorary Fellowship of the American College of Obstetricians and Gynecologists and the Royal College of Obstetricians and Gynaecologists for his promotion of women's health and rights. In 1998, Sai received the Harvard School of Public Health Alumni Award of Merit for his contributions to the field of public health; the highest honour the school bestows on its alumni. In 2006, he was awarded one of Ghana's highest national honours, Order of the Star of Ghana - Member of the Star of Ghana (MSG) Civil Division. The Fred T. Sai Institute, an initiative of the IPPF Africa Region, was established in Sai's honour as a "pioneer public health research institute, championing research on population and sexual reproductive health...to generate evidence on effective health strategies aimed at improving the health of the population in sub-Saharan Africa." In June 2019, on the occasion of his 95th birthday, Sai was acknowledged for his efforts towards the welfare of the female gender over two and a half decades. The event, organised by the United Nations Population Fund (UNFPA) Ghana Country Office, was attended by several members of the international and diplomatic communities and was graced by the Ghanaian president Nana Addo Dankwa Akufo Addo and his wife, Rebecca Akufo-Addo.

== Death and funeral ==
Fred Torgbor Sai died in Accra on 17 September 2019 at the age of 95. The funeral of F. T. Sai was held at the Ebenezer Presbyterian Church, Osu. Upon his death, Sai's obituary was published in The Guardian.

== Selected works ==
Some of his published works include:

- Some Ethical Issues in Family Planning, Occasional essays (December 1976) co-authored with International Planned Parenthood Federation (IPPF)
- Technology, human dignity, and national development, The J.B. Danquah memorial lectures (1976)
- Population and National Development: Dilemma of Developing Countries, Occasional essays (March 1977) co-authored with Penny Kane
- Food, Population and Politics, Occasional essays (April 1977) co-authored with Penny Kane
- Defining Family Health Needs: Standards of Care and Priorities, with Particular Reference to Family Planning, Occasional essays (May 1977)
- Health, Nutrition and Population in Human Settlements (Occasional essays) International Planned Parenthood Federation; No. 5 (August 1977)
- Ethical approaches to family planning in Africa (1989)
- The World Bank's role in shaping Third World population policy (1990) co-authored with Lauren A. Chester
- Dr Fred Sai Speaks Out International Planned Parenthood Federation (IPPF) (1994)
- Adam & Eve and the Serpent: Breaking the bonds to free Africa's women (1995)
- Why is Africa losing the battle against AIDS, Accra: Ghana Academy of Arts and Sciences (1999)
- “Family Planning in Ghana” in The Global Family Planning Revolution: Three Decades of Population Policies, by Warren C. Robinson, John A. Ross, World Bank, Washington DC (2007) co-authored with John C. Caldwell
- With Heart and Voice: Fred Sai Remembers (2010)
