= Afua Adwo Jectey Hesse =

Ghanaian surgeon and academic

Afua Adwo Jectey Hesse FRCS(Ed), FICS, FFGCS, FWACS
- Occupations: academic; physician
- Spouse: Adukwei Hesse

Academic background
- Education: Wesley Girls' High School; University of Ghana; Ghana Institute of Management and Public Administration; University of Leeds

Academic work
- Institutions: University of Ghana Medical School
- Main interests: Paediatric surgery

Afua Adwo Jectey Hesse is a Ghanaian surgeon and the first Ghanaian-trained female doctor to become a paediatric surgeon. In August 2010, she became the first Ghanaian and second African to be elected President of the Medical Women's International Association (MWIA).

== Education and training ==
Afua Hesse was born on 11 September in Kumasi. She had her secondary level education at the Wesley Girls' Senior High School in Cape Coast. Then furthered at the University of Ghana Medical School where she trained to become a medical doctor. She is a Fellow of the Royal College of Surgeons of Edinburgh (FRCSE), UK, and the West African College of Surgeons (FWACS) as well as a Foundation Fellow of the Ghana College of Physicians and Surgeons (FFGCS). She is also a Fellow of the International College of Surgeons (FICS). She holds a Level 8 Diploma of the Chartered Management Institute, London, UK She also holds a certificate in Health Management Administration for Senior Health Practitioners from the Ghana Institute of Management and Public Administration (GIMPA), a Certificate in Health Management, Planning and Policy from University of Leeds.

== Career ==
She is a woman of many firsts. She was the first female Paediatric Surgeon in Ghana as well as the first woman surgeon from her alma mater and served as the President of the Medical Women's International Association, another first for a Ghanaian in the 91-year history of the Association which is the first International Professional Women's Association. She is a professor of surgery at the University of Ghana Medical School and has served in various capacities at both the Medical School and the Korle Bu Teaching Hospital with over three decades of experience. She was the first female to serve as Head of the Department of Surgery, Director of Medical Affairs, Head of the Paediatric Surgery Unit and subsequently the Acting CEO of the Korle Bu Teaching Hospital on the retirement of Nii Otu Nartey. She was the first female Honorary Secretary of the Ghana Medical Association. She lectures at both undergraduate and post graduate levels at the University of Ghana Medical School and is a reviewer for various International peer-reviewed medical journals. She has undertaken several assignments including serving as a Consultant for the Ministry of Health, serving on boards of some companies and tertiary institutions and the Ghana Medical Association and the University Community in various capacities. Currently, she is co-founder and President of the Accra College of Medicine, Ghana's leading private Medical school which graduated its first cohort of doctors in 2020.

== Selected publications ==
Afua Hesse has written and contributed chapters to several important publications. She has over thirty publications to her credit.

== Recognition ==
Afua Hesse has been honoured by several appointments, positions and awards. In 2010, she received the Millennium Excellence Award for Medical Leadership and in 2017, she won Glitz Africa Excellence in Health Award.

== Personal life ==
Afua Hesse is married to Adukwei Hesse, an Internal Medicine Specialist as well as a Minister of the Presbyterian Church and the co-founder of the Accra College of Medicine with whom she has four children.
