= Ibrahim Adamu Yakasai =

Nigerian vice chancellor

- Born: Kano State
- Citizenship: Nigeria
- Education: Ahmadu Bello University (MBBS), University of Winchester (MA)
- Occupations: Academic, Gynecological oncologist medical educator
- Known for: Pioneer vice chancellor federal university of health science and technology Tsafe
- Title: Colonel (Retd.), Nigerian Army
- Awards: Force Services Star (FSS), Meritorious Service Star (MSS), Member of the National Institute (mni)

Ibrahim Adamu Yakasai is a retired colonel from the Nigerian Army, is currently the provost of Bayero University's College of Health Sciences in Kano. Is also a member of the Governing Council at the Federal University of Health Sciences in Otukpo, Benue State, he is the Chairman of the Committee of Provosts of Colleges of Medicine in Nigeria.He is a professor specialized in Obstetrician & Gynaecologist, in Kano state. He was appointed as the vice chancellor Federal University of health sciences and Technology,Tsafe Zamfara state in August 2025 by President Bola Ahmed Tinubu.

== Early life ==
Yakasai was born in Kano state. He received his Bachelor of Medicine, Bachelor of Surgery (MBBS) degree from Ahmadu Bello University in Zaria.He was awarded a European Economic Commission scholarship for postgraduate training in the United Kingdom, where he became a member and then a fellow of the Royal College of Obstetricians and Gynecologists (FRCOG).He has a master's degree in medical education from the University of Winchester. He also received fellowships from the International College of Surgeons (FICS), and the American College of Surgeons (FACS).

== Career ==
Yakasai served in the Nigerian Army, holding leadership positions until he retired as a Colonel.

He served as the hospital management board Director-General, he established a residency training program that trained over 70 medical residents.In 2019, he attended the National Institute for Policy and Strategic Studies (NIPSS) in Kuru (Senior Executive Course 41), earning the designation Member of the National Institute (mni).He has also served as Chairman of the Committee of Provosts of Colleges of Medicine in Nigeria.

Yakasai was an Electoral Officer for the 2023 Nigerian general elections. His collation centre was invaded by thugs and threatened with death, and he was forced to announce fake results, with Alhassan Doguwa winning the election.

== Appointment/Leadership ==
In August 2025, he was appointed as the pioneer vice chancellor of the federal University of health science and technology Tsafe (FUHSATT) Zamfara State by President Bola Ahmed Tinubu.

He is the current president of West Africa College of Surgeons.

== Research ==
Yakasai's research is focused on gynecological oncology, reproductive health, and medical education approaches, with over 80 peer-reviewed journal articles. He served on the National Universities Commission (NUC) committee in charge of revising the undergraduate medical and PhD curricula for Nigerian medical doctors.
