= Adukwei Hesse =

Ghanaian physician and academic

Ian Frederick Adukwei Hesse MRCP(Lond)
- Born: Ian Frederick Adukwei Hesse
- Education: Achimota School; University of Ghana (MBChB); University of Birmingham (PhD); Royal College of Physicians (MRCP)
- Occupations: Professor; physician; Presbyterian minister
- Spouse: Afua Adwo Jectey Hesse
- Scientific career
- Fields: Physiology
- Workplaces: University of Ghana; Accra College of Medicine

Ecclesiastical career
- Church: Presbyterian Church of Ghana

Ian Frederick Adukwei Hesse, MRCP(Lond) is a Ghanaian academic, physician and a Presbyterian minister. He was on the faculty at the Department of Physiology at the University of Ghana Medical School, a consultant physician as well as a co-founder and the Vice President of Accra College of Medicine. He was formerly assistant secretary and later vice-president of the Ghana Medical Association. He is an ordained minister of the Presbyterian Church of Ghana. He is involved in prison reform and ministry in Ghana.

== Early life and education ==
A member of the notable Hesse family, Hesse had his secondary education at Achimota School from 1965 to 1971, where he obtained his GCE Ordinary and Advanced Level certificates. He entered the University of Ghana Medical School directly without a pre-medical course due to his superior performance in the final examinations. He obtained his Bachelor of Science in physiology in 1975, and his bachelor of medicine and bachelor of surgery (MBChB) certificate in 1978. While at the University of Ghana Medical School, he served as secretary of the Ghana Medical School Students Association and actively participated in demonstrations organised by student bodies opposing the "unigov" concept of governance during the Acheampong regime. He enrolled at the University of Birmingham, Birmingham, United Kingdom in 1980 and was awarded his doctorate degree (PhD) in 1983.

== Career ==
=== Academic ===
He returned to Ghana after his stint in the United Kingdom and joined the staff of the University of Ghana Medical School as a lecturer in the Physiology department and the department of Medicine and Therapeutics. In 1995 he was promoted to senior lecturer status at the departments of Physiology, and Medicine and Therapeutics. A year later he was made head of the Physiology department of the University of Ghana Medical School. He served in that capacity for two years. He became an associate professor of physiology, and Medicine and Therapeutics from 2002 until 2005 when he became a chief executive of the Executive Healthcare and Consult. He subsequently became a part-time lecturer (associate professor) at the Physiology, and Medicine and Therapeutics department of the University of Ghana Medical School. He co-established and is currently the vice-president of the Accra College of Medicine.

=== Medical profession ===
He worked in various hospitals after completing his graduate studies at the University of Birmingham until 1987 when he officially became a member of the Royal College of Surgeons, London. Upon his return to Ghana in 1988 he joined the Department of Medicine at the Korle-Bu Teaching Hospital as a consultant physician. A year later he was made assistant secretary of the Ghana Medical Association, he served in that capacity until 1992. In 1995 he was vice-president of the association and head of the chest department at the Korle-Bu Teaching Hospital, a position he held for three years. That same year, he joined the National Tuberculosis Program as a member of its advisory board. In 1999 he became a member of the Technical Working Group of the National Tuberculosis Control Programme. In 2005 he became the Chief Executive of the Executive Health Care and Consult. He is the founder of the Ghana Asthma Society.

=== Ministry ===
Adukwei trained as a pastor at the Ramseyer Training Centre in Abetifi, Kwahu. He completed his training in 1996 and was ordained a minister by the Presbyterian Church of Ghana. He is the national leader of the Prison Ministry of Ghana, He also pastors a Presbyterian church in Accra. He was a member of the Accra Ridge Church.

== Selected publications ==
His research interests encompass areas of hypertension, asthma and tuberculosis and has authored and co-authored various articles that have been published in journals such as the Ghana Medical Journal and the West African Medical Journal concerning these topics. Some of his works include;

- (contrib.) Knowledge of asthma and its management in newly qualified doctors in Accra, Ghana, 1995
- (contrib.) Impairment of renal sodium excretion in tropical residents - Phenomenological analysis, 1999
- (contrib.) Characteristics of adult tetanus in Accra, 2003;
- (contrib.) Blood pressure response to out-patient drug treatment of hypertension in 1973 - 1993 at Korle-Bu Teaching Hospital, Accra, Ghana, (2003)
- (contrib.) The characteristics, knowledge, beliefs and practices of parent/guardians of children with asthma in Accra, Ghana, 2004;
- (contrib.) A tuberculin skin test survey among Ghanaian school children., 2010
- (contrib.) First Nationwide Survey of the Prevalence of TB/HIV Co-Infection in Ghana, 2018

== Honours ==
For his services to the Ghana Medical Association, the medical profession and the Ghana at large; he was made a Fellow of the Ghana Medical Association, the highest award of the association.

== Personal life ==
He is married to Dr. Afua Adwo Jectey Hesse; a surgeon and a gender advocate and they have four children. She was formerly the chief executive officer of the Korle-Bu Teaching Hospital. Some of Adukwei's interests include music. He played viola for the Achimota School Orchestra. He was also a member of the Aggrey Memorial Chapel Choir at Achimota School, and the Accra Ridge Church Choir.
