= Akosa =

Akosa is an African surname that may refer to the following notable people:

- Agyeman Badu Akosa (born 1953), Ghanaian pathologist, politician and social commentator
- George Akosa Ghanaian politician
- Titilope Gbemisola Akosa, Nigerian environmentalist, climate justice advocate and lawyer
