= Kwabena Frimpong-Boateng =

Ghanaian physician and cardiothoracic surgeon

Kwabena Frimpong-Boateng FGA
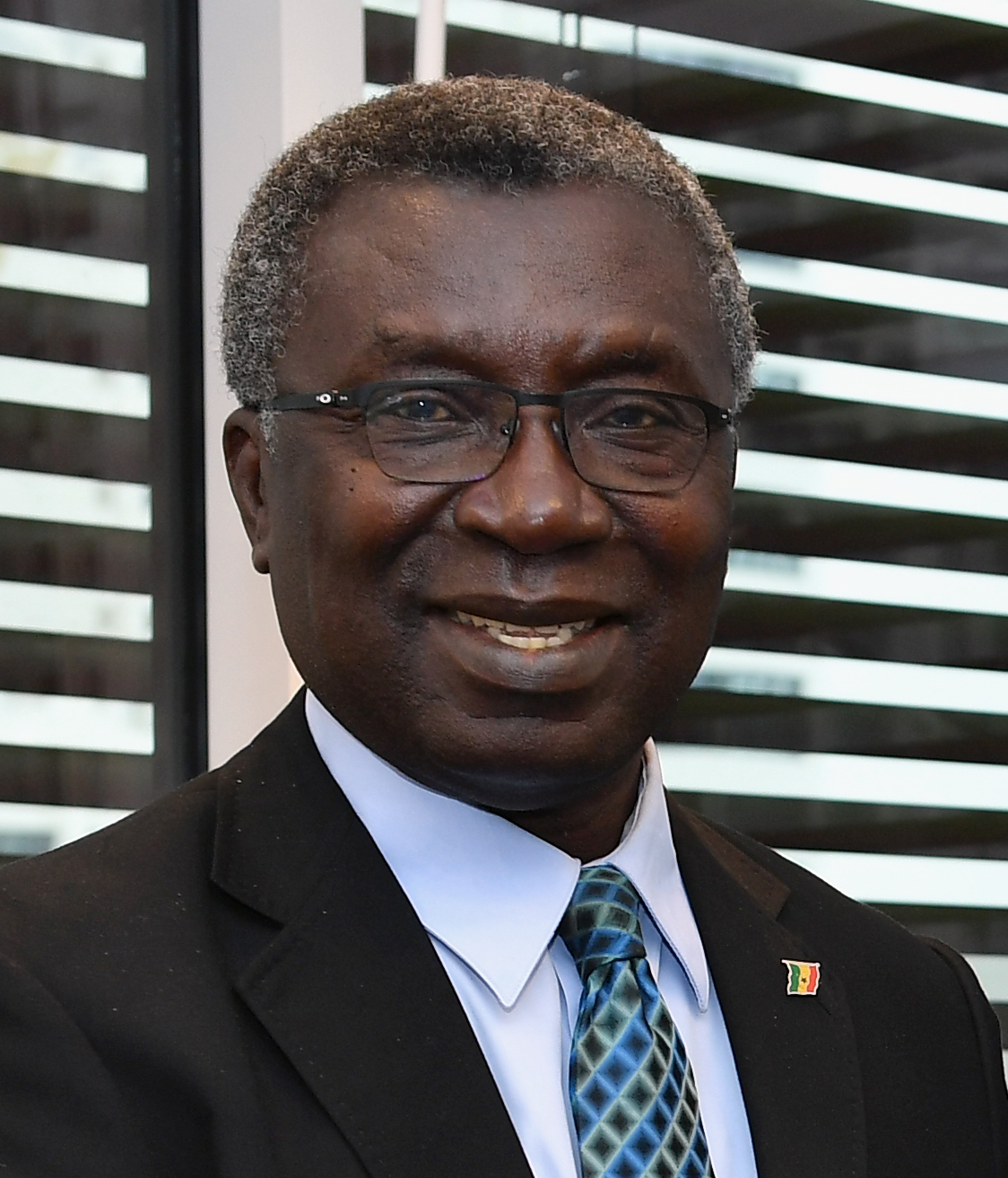
- Born: 1949 (age 76–77); Ghana
- Education: University of Ghana
- Occupations: Cardiothoracic surgeon Doctor
- Spouse: Agnes Frimpong-Boateng
- Children: 5
- Scientific career
- Fields: Cardiothoracic surgery
- Workplaces: University of Ghana Medical School
- Parent: Kofi Frimpong (father)

Minister for Environment, Science, Technology and Innovation
- In office March 2017 – 6 January 2021
- President: Nana Akufo-Addo

Kwabena Frimpong-Boateng FGA (born 1949) is a Ghanaian physician and cardiothoracic surgeon who established the National Cardiothoracic Center in Accra, Ghana. He is also the president of the Ghana Heart Foundation and was the chief executive officer of Korle-Bu Teaching Hospital in Accra.

A well-known figure in his country, Frimpong-Boateng was elected a Fellow of the Ghana Academy of Arts and Sciences in December 2002.

== Early life and education ==
Prof. Frimpong-Boateng had his secondary education at Sekondi College, located in Sekondi in the Western Region of Ghana. He went to the University of Ghana in 1968, starting with a one-year pre-science course. Then in 1969, he was admitted as an undergraduate in University of Ghana Medical School.

In 1975, he obtained an MB ChB degree from the University of Ghana Medical School. He was the best candidate in the final examination, becoming the winner of the Easmon Prize for being the best student in surgery.

He served as a House Officer or Intern at the departments of medicine and surgery, in Korle Bu Teaching Hospital, and later worked as a medical officer at the Komfo Anokye Teaching Hospital in Kumasi in the Ashanti Region.

He left for Germany in 1978 for further studies, and spent more than ten years there, first for language studies at the Goethe Institute at Radolfzell and Boppard in 1978. The he specialised in cardiothoracic surgery at Hannover Medical School, Germanyin Hanover from 1978 to 1988, where he earned several academic qualifications.

== Career ==
He qualified as a general, cardiothoracic and vascular surgeon. He subsequently worked as a consultant cardiothoracic surgeon and was one of the pioneers of the heart transplantation programme in Hannover, where he also taught both undergraduate and postgraduate Thorax, Cardio-thoracic and Vascular Surgery.

Prof. Frimpong-Boateng returned to Ghana to practice as Ghana’s first locally-based Cardiothoracic Surgeon. This involved setting up the National Cardiothoracic Centre at the Korle Bu Teaching Hospital in 1992, as there were no cardiothoracic surgery facilities in the country at the time.

He joined the University of Ghana Medical School as a lecturer in 2000 and got promoted to associate professor same year. He was made a full professor in 2002. He also served as head of the department of surgery at the school, prior to his appointment as the chief executive officer of the Korle-Bu Teaching Hospital in 2002. He was elected to the Ghana Academy of Arts and Sciences in December 2002 and gave his inaugural lecture the following year. Frimpong-Boateng also runs a charitable foundation, the Ghana Heart Foundation, which is responsible for paying for heart surgeries for poor patients with support from his donors.

== Politics ==
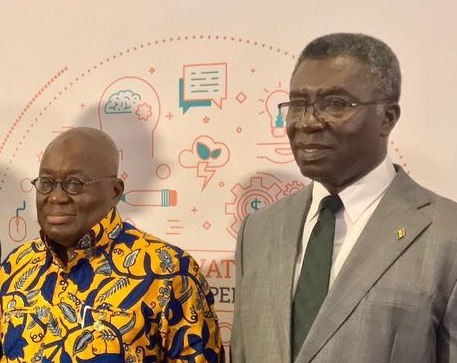
Frimpong-Boateng with President Nana Akufo-Addo

In March 2006, Frimpong-Boateng announced his intention to seek the nomination as the candidate of the New Patriotic Party (NPP) for the December 2008 National Presidential Elections. Documentaries were made about his life and his hopes, but at the end, the candidate elected was Nana Akufo-Addo.

Regardless of his result, he declared he is still concerned with political issues in relation to education and health problems. He would later regret that political corruption in Ghana was too much and said that in his opinion politicians were not taking social priorities into account, especially the need of technology. After the 2016 election, he was appointed as the minister for Environment and natural resource, a position he acted in from the year 2017 to 2021.

== Involvements ==
In November 2018, Frimpong-Boateng, address the World Summit Awards Grand in Accra, Ghana, and indicated his indicated his desire to use technology to transform the country.

== Achievements ==
- 1992 – Established the National Cardio Thoracic Centre which is now recognised by the West African College of Surgeons to train heart surgeons, cardiologists, cardiac anaesthetists, operating room nurses, intensive care nurses, cardiac technicians, and other cardiothoracic technicians.(1992)
- Performed the first open-heart surgery in Ghana using the heart-lung-machine.
- Established the Ghana Heart Foundation to raise funds to assist those who cannot afford the cost of heart surgery.
- 1999 – Chartered Institute of Marketing, Ghana (CIMG) Marketing Man of the Year.
- 10 September 2004 – Honorary Doctor of Science degree from the University of Education, Winneba.

== Awards ==
- Certificate of appreciation from Orphanage International Ministry in recognition of humanitarian service to Cardio Centre at Korle-Bu Teaching Hospital and to society in Ghana at large especially orphan children 27 July 2002.
- Recognition award from Soviet (CIS) trained doctors association for devoted and meritorious service to Ghana, 5 December 2001.
- Certificate of Distinction from Sapphire Ghana Ltd. For outstanding contribution to National Development, August 1999.
- Award from Enterprise Insurance Company, Ghana in recognition of efforts, achievements, perseverance and success, 1999.
- Millennium Excellence Award Recipient as personality of the decade, December 1999.
- Chartered Institute of Marketing, Ghana, Marketing Man of the Year 1999.
- Co-recipient of the 2003 special award from the Ghana Chartered Institute of Marketing to the Centre for Technology-Driven Economic Development (CTED).
- Recognition award from the civil service of Ghana for meritorious services rendered to the Ghana Civil Service and the people of Ghana, 1998.
- St Luke's Day award from the Sr. Michael and All Saints Anglican Church Korle Gonno, Accra, Ghana for distinguished service as a medical doctor in the service of the Lord, 1993.
- Nobles International Award in recognition of status as an eminent West African who believes in Honesty, Integrity and Accountability, 28 November 2003.
- UN Volunteers Certificate of appreciation in recognition of voluntary contribution to national development, International Voluntary Day, 5 December 2005.
- Asante of Honour Award presented by Otumfuo, Asantehene, 25 November 2005.
- Personality of the year award 2004, by the People of the Western Region of Ghana for outstanding contribution towards the Development and promotion of Ghana, Sept 2005.
- Personality of the Decade, awarded by the Millennium Excellence Foundation 2005.
- Legend of the Year, awarded at the 2017 People's Choice Practitioners Honours organised by Media Men Ghana.

== Personal life ==
Frimpong-Boateng and his wife, Agnes, have five children, one of whom is a promising athlete.

Frimpong-Boateng is a farmer. He established the first ostrich farm in Ghana, in the village of Dedukope, in the Volta Region. He also grows jatropha for the production of bio-diesel. Frimpong-Boateng runs a CNC machine tool centre that is able to produce spare parts with computer precision at the Free Zones enclave in the port city of Tema.

He is a Christian. He has said that his work on the foundation of the National Cardiothoracic Centre was God's purpose in his life to do and he believes that was his purpose of creation and he is grateful, and has declared that Ghana needs a "God-fearing" man to lead the country. He has quoted Albert Einstein saying: "I want to know God's thoughts; the rest are details." In 2011, in his 60s, he considered himself still a strong man with passion "by God’s grace."

== Publications ==
- Frimpong-Boateng, Kwabena (2000). Deep down my heart: A history of cardiothoracic surgery in Ghana. Accra: K. Frimpong-Boateng. ISBN 978-9988-0-0398-2. OCLC 50006257.
- Frimpong-Boateng, Kwabena, Samuel K. Owusu, J. O. M. Pobee (2006), Medicine, Ghana Academy of Arts and Sciences. ISBN 9964969201; 9789964969202
- Frimpong-Boateng, Kwabena (2015), "Taming a Monster".
