= Agyeman Badu Akosa =

Ghanaian pathologist, academic, politician and social commentator

Director-General of the Ghana Health Service
- In office March 2002 – June 2006
- President: John Agyekum Kufuor
- Succeeded by: Elias K. Sory

Personal details
- Born: 25 December 1953 (age 72) Asante Mampong, Ghana
- Party: Convention People's Party
- Spouse: Maxine Boatemaa Boateng
- Relations: George Akosa (brother)
- Children: 2
- Education: Prempeh College; Ghana Senior High Technical School
- Alma mater: University of Ghana
- Profession: Pathologist

Agyeman Badu Akosa (born 25 December 1953) is a Ghanaian pathologist, academic, politician and social commentator. He served as the Director-General of the Ghana Health Service from 2002 to 2006. He is a member of the Convention People's Party and is a well-known believer in the ideals of Kwame Nkrumah, founder of the CPP. He contested for the Party's presidential candidate ahead the 2008 General elections and lost to Dr. Paa Kwesi Ndoum. He is a professor of Pathology. He is an advocate on lifestyle issues.

== Early life and education ==
Agyeman Badu Akosa was born on 25 December 1953 to Jones Clifford Akosa and Nancy Akosua Nkrabea Akosa in Asante Mampong in the Ashanti Region of Ghana. He had his secondary school education at Prempeh College in the Ashanti Region for his GCE Ordinary Level and Ghana Senior High Technical School in Takoradi, Western Region for his GCE Advanced Level. He furthered his education at the University of Ghana where he obtained a Bachelor of Medicine, Bachelor of Surgery (MB BCh) from the University of Ghana, Legon in 1979 and Defined contribution plan from University London, 1983.

== Career ==
=== Medical career ===
Akosa started his career as a House Officer at the Korle-Bu Teaching Hospital, Accra, Ghana from 1979 to 1980, then went on to start his residency specializing in pathology at the same hospital from 1980 to 1982. He moved to the Royal Postgraduate Medical School at Hammersmith Hospital in London to work and understudy as a registrar from 1984 to 1986, then as a senior registrar from 1986 to 1990 at the Hammersmith Hospital. He also worked at the St. Bernard's Hospital, Gibraltar from 1988 to 1990. From 1990 to 1995, Akosa worked as a consultant and director at the Whipps Cross Hospital, London. In 1996, he returned to Ghana after his work and study experience to work at the Korle-Bu Teaching Hospital as the director of pathology. He also worked as the Head of department of Pathology at the University of Ghana Medical School. He rose to the rank of professor of pathology at the University of Ghana Medical school.

==== Director-General of GHS ====
In 2002, Akosa was appointed by President John Agyekum Kufuor to serve as the Director-General of the Ghana Health Service. He served from March 2002 to June 2006 and was replaced with Dr. Alias Sorie in early 2007.

== Politics ==
Akosa is a member of the Convention People's Party (CPP). He is well known for his stance on being a true patriot and an Nkrumaist, believing in the ideals and ideologies of Dr. Kwame Nkrumah, the founder of CPP and the first president of the Republic of Ghana. He has over years served on several committees of the party and is regarded as one of the leading members of the party.

=== Presidential bid 2008 ===
In 2007, he declared his intention to stand for the presidential candidate primaries election of the party standing against then member of parliament for Komenda-Edina-Eguafo-Abirem, Paa Kwesi Nduom, 2004 elections presidential candidate George Aggudey, economist and engineer Dr. Kwaku Osafo, Bright Akwetey and Asante Akufo. In December 2017, at the Party's Delegates' Congress at Great Hall KNUST, he lost the primaries and placed second to Paa Kwesi Nduom who was given the mandate to stand as the flag bearer for the party in the 2008 elections. Ndoum garnered 1,067 votes whilst he got 664 votes, followed by Aggudey, Kwaku Osafo, Akwetey and Akufo who had 139 votes, 48 votes, 37 votes and 11 votes respectively at the end of the voting process.

After the election, there was information on both radio and in newspapers that he would be chosen by Ndoum to be his running mate, but Nduom chose Michael Abu Sakara Foster. He was subsequently appointed as a member of the party's national campaign team to help Nduom win the 2008 elections with Ivor Kobina Greenstreet serving as Chairman of the National Parliamentary Campaign Team. Unfortunately the party lost the elections with John Atta Mills of the NDC emerging winner after a second of voting.

=== 2012 Elections ===
Akosa was again one of three names in the media to have been shortlisted for vice presidential role by the then flag bearer Michael Abu Sakara Foster of the party but later Nana Akosua Frimpomaa-Sarpong was chosen as the party's first female running mate.

==== National transition team ====
Akosa was appointed as a member of the 24-member National Transition Team in accordance with the Presidential Transition Act, 2012 (Act 845) by then President-elect John Dramani Mahama of the NDC after he had won the elections in December 2012, even though he was not a member of the NDC. The transition team was chaired by the Vice President-elect Paa Kwesi Bekoe Amissah-Arthur.

== Professional associations ==
Akosa is a member of the Ghana Medical Association (GMA) and the Commonwealth Medical Association and has served as president on both associations in past, serving as President of GMA from 1999 to 2001. He is also a member of the Royal College Pathologists (London), British Medical Association, British Society Dermatopathologists and also the New York Academy of Sciences.

== Boards ==
Within his capacity as an academic, medical doctor and a social commentator, Akosa has been appointed to several boards both locally and internationally. He is currently the executive director of Healthy Ghana, Chairman of Prudential Life Insurance and the President of Phytica Ghana. He is also the Vice Chairman of the executive board of the African Population Health Research Centre located in Nairobi, Kenya and serves on the board of Safety Ghana.

He has also served as the Executive Chairman of Ghana Healthcare Ltd, Chairman of the Tobacco Control Task force in Ghana and a board member of Ghana Prisons Service. He also served as Chairman of the St. John Ambulance, Trust Hospital and the Vitamilk Foundation. He was also the President of the Ghana Skin Foundation.

=== International engagements ===
Akosa has worked several times under the World Health Organization(WHO), including working as the WHO Advisor on Polio Eradication in Nigeria and as president of the WHO AFRO Task Force on Immunization.

== Author ==
As an academic and researcher, Akosa has authored over 60 scientific publications, abstracts and conference monographs including contributing to The Global Report on Research for Infectious Diseases of Poverty of the Special Programme for Research and Training in Tropical Diseases (TDR)''.

=== Social commentator ===
As a politician and social commentator, he has also authored over 50 socioeconomic articles in Ghana's leading newspaper, the Daily Graphic as well as other newspapers and channels . He is mostly interviewed several times on Ghanaian mainstream television and radio stations to comment on topics ranging from politics, healthcare delivery to lifestyles choices.

== Honours and recognition ==
Akosa was honoured in 2006 by President John Agyekum Kufuor with Companion of the Order of the Volta for Public and Medical Services (CV) which is the second-highest award in Ghana. He is a Fellow of the Ghana Academy of Arts and Sciences, the Ghana Medical Association, the Ghana College of Physicians and Surgeons, the West African College of Physicians and the Royal College of Pathologists.

== Personal life ==
Agyemang Badu Akosa has been married to Maxine Boatemaa Boateng since 26 June 1982 and together they have two adult children, Nana Serwa and Fredua Agyeman. Akosa being a proud Asante, he was the Vice chairman of the Asante Kotoko Society in London in 1993 and is also a past President of Prempeh College Old Students Association.
