= Emmanuel Evans-Anfom =

Ghanaian physician and academic (1919–2021)

Emmanuel Evans-Anfom FRCSEd FICS FAAS FWACS FGA MSG

Commissioner for Education and Culture
- In office 29 September 1978 – September 1979
- President: Fred Akuffo; Jerry John Rawlings
- Preceded by: Paul Nkegbe
- Succeeded by: Francis Kwame Buah

Commissioner for Health
- In office June 1979 – September 1979
- President: Jerry John Rawlings
- Preceded by: Neville Alexander Odartey-Wellington
- Succeeded by: Michael Paul Ansah

Vice Chancellor of the Kwame Nkrumah University of Science and Technology
- In office 1967–1973
- Preceded by: R. P. Baffour
- Succeeded by: E. Bamfo-Kwakye

Personal details
- Born: 7 October 1919 Accra, Gold Coast
- Died: 7 April 2021 (aged 101) Accra, Ghana
- Spouses: Leonora Evans (m. 1952; died 1980) Elise Henkel (m. 1984)
- Children: 4
- Education: Achimota College; University of Edinburgh (MBChB, DTM&H)
- Profession: Physician; academic
- Notable Awards: Gold Coast Medical Scholar
- Scientific career
- Fields: Anatomy
- Workplaces: University of Ghana Medical School

Emmanuel Evans-Anfom (7 October 1919 – 7 April 2021) was a Ghanaian physician, scholar, university administrator, and public servant who served as the second Vice Chancellor of the Kwame Nkrumah University of Science and Technology from 1967 to 1973.

== Early life and education ==
A member of the Ga-Dangme people of Accra, Evans-Anfom was born on 7 October 1919 at the Evans family house, High Street, Jamestown, Accra. His father, William Quarshie Anfom, was of Nzema and Shai origin - Shai Hills area in Dodowa and Doryumu. His mother, Mary Emma Evans, was the daughter of William Timothy Evans, a teacher-catechist of the Basel Mission who taught at Salem School at Osu. The Evans family was a well-known Gold Coast Euro-African Ga family that descended from Welsh traders. In 1925, he enrolled at the Government Junior Boys' School in Jamestown and later, the Government Senior Boys' School at Rowe Road. He attended the Presbyterian middle boarding school, the Salem School at Osu where the principal at the time, Carl Henry Clerk encouraged him to apply for a Cadbury Scholarship for study at Achimota College instead of going the normal teacher-training route at the Basel Mission-founded Presbyterian teacher training seminary at Akropong, now known as the Presbyterian College of Education, Akropong. He was elected the School Prefect of Achimota School. In January 1939, he enrolled in the inter-preliminary medical course of Science at Achimota. In that course, he received advanced training in physics, chemistry, botany and zoology. At Achimota, he won a Gold Coast medical scholarship in 1941 to study medicine at the University of Edinburgh, graduating in 1947. He also studied in a postgraduate diploma course in tropical medicine (DTM&H), completing in 1950. He elected a Fellow of the Royal College of Surgeons of Edinburgh in 1963. He captained the Achimota School Hockey XI, the Combined Scottish Universities Hockey XI, and was club captain of Edinburgh University Men's Hockey Club.

== Medical career ==
After Edinburgh, Evans-Anform worked for a year at the Dewsbury General Infirmary in Leeds, Yorkshire, as a House Physician and House Surgeon and Casualty Officer. Evans-Anfom worked in various hospitals in the government medical system: Korle-Bu Teaching Hospital, Dunkwa-On-Offin Government Hospital, Tarkwa Government Hospital, Kumasi Central Hospital, Tamale Government Hospital and Effia Nkwanta Hospital in Sekondi. During his long medical career, he worked with other medical trailblazers such as Susan Ofori-Atta and Matilda J. Clerk, the first and second Ghanaian women physicians respectively. He also did medical outreach in the Congo in the 1960s.

== Academic career ==
A pioneering medical educator himself, he was approached by the first Ghanaian surgeon, Charles Odamtten Easmon in 1963 for a teaching professorship position in Anatomy at the then newly established University of Ghana Medical School, an offer he eventually accepted. Evans-Anfom acted as the Chief Medical Administrator at the medical school. In 1958, Evans-Anfom co-founded the Ghana Medical Association together with Drs. Charles Odamtten Easmon, Silas Dodu, Anum Barnor and Schandorf. He later served as president of the association from 1968 to 1970. He served as the President of the West African College of Surgeons from 1969 to 1971. He was also elected the Chairman of the Medical and Dental Council in 1979. He was a founding Fellow of the African Academy of Sciences in 1986. He was also elected a Fellow of the International College of Surgeons. He was also the Chairman of the Centre for Scientific Research into Plant Medicine.

=== Term as Vice-Chancellor ===
Evans-Anfom served as the second Vice-Chancellor of the Kwame Nkrumah University of Science and Technology (KNUST) from 1967 to 1973. At KNUST, Anfom first introduced the ceremony commonly known as "Matriculation" into the university entry ceremonies. He chaired a myriad of committees, boards and missions, both locally and on the international scene in Africa, Europe and North America.

== Politics and public service ==
Evans-Anfom served concurrently as the Commissioner of Education and Culture and Commissioner for Health under the military government of the Jerry John Rawlings-led Armed Forces Revolutionary Council (AFRC) in the late 1970s. He was a member of the Council of State in the Hilla Limann government from 1979 to 1981. During the Provisional National Defence Council era under Jerry Rawlings, Evans-Anfom was appointed the chairman of the National Council for Higher Education (now National Council for Tertiary Education) and the chairman of the Education Commission.

He was president of the Ghana Academy of Arts and Sciences (1987–90) and chairman of the West African Examinations Council (WAEC). During Evans-Anfom's time as Commissioner of Education, Rawlings appointed him the chair of a special commission to review the existing Ghanaian educational system, and the committee introduced reforms beginning in 1987. Changes under the Evans-Anfom Committee included establishing a nine-year basic education consisting of primary school (six years) and junior secondary school (three years), followed by a newly established senior secondary school education (three years); requiring successful passage of examinations for the end of both secondary school sequences; and changing the emphasis of education from strictly academic to also include vocational, technical and practical training. Other changes implemented by the committee included grouping secondary school curricular programs into five categories: Agriculture, General Arts and Science, Business, Technical, and Vocational.

== Personal life ==
Evans-Anfom had four children with his first wife Leonora Francetta Evans, a West Indian American of Bahamian descent, who he wedded on 13 December 1952 in Accra. Leonora Evans died in 1980 in Edinburgh. In 1984, he married Elise Henkel. Evans-Anfom was a founding member and president of the Gold Coast and Ghana Hockey Associations in 1950 and 1957 respectively. He also captained the Gold Coast and Ghana National Hockey Teams.

He served as a Presbyter and Senior Presbyter of the Ebenezer Presbyterian Church, Osu, where he was a congregant. He served as chairman, Akrofi-Christaller Institute of Theology, Mission and Culture (1986–2002) and President of the Ghana Boys Brigade.

== Death and funeral ==
Evans-Anfom died on 7 April 2021 in Accra, aged 101 years. He was a given a ceremonial funeral by the Government of Ghana in recognition of his contributions to society.

== Awards and honours ==
In 1996, he was adjudged the "Alumnus of the Year" by his alma mater, the University of Edinburgh for "his major contribution to the development of medicine in the Congo and to medical education in Ghana".

- 1934: Listed on the Honour Board of the Salem School, Osu
- 1968: Elected president of the Ghana Medical Association
- 1971: Elected fellow of the Ghana Academy of Arts and Sciences
- 1974: Honorary degree of Doctor of Science (Hon. D.Sc.), University of Salford
- 1996: Honorary doctorate degree in literature (honoris causa) Hon. D.Litt. by the Akrofi Christaller Institute, Akropong Akuapem
- 1983–1998: Chairman of the Inter-Church and Ecumenical Relations Committee of Ghana
- 2003: Awarded honorary Doctor of Science degree (D.Sc.) by the KNUST
- 2006: Decorated with the Order of the Star of Ghana

== Selected works ==
- To the Thirsty Land: Autobiography of a Patriot, Africa Christian Press, 2003
- "Intestinal Perforation – Some Observations on Aetiology and Management"
- "The Evidence for Transformation of Lymphocytes into Liver"
- "Political leadership and national development in Ghana"
- "Traditional medicine in Ghana : practice, problems and prospects"
- "Report of the National Consultative Committee on Education Finance, September 1974-January 1975"
- "Development and dissemination of appropriate technologies in rural areas : international workshop held in Kumasi, July 1972"
