= Accra Ridge Church =

Interdenominational church in Accra, Ghana

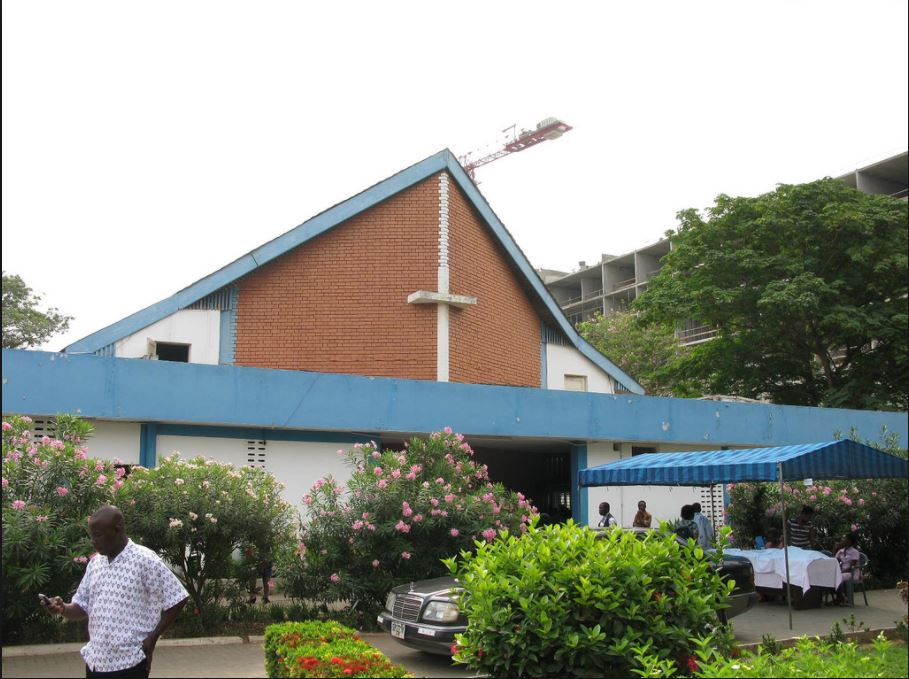
- The main entrance to the Accra Ridge Church
- Accra Ridge Church
- 5°33′19.48″N 0°11′52.42″W
- Location: Gamel Abdul Nasser Ave and Guinea Bissau Road, Ridge, Osu, Accra
- Country: Ghana
- Denomination: Anglican Diocese of Accra; Methodist Church Ghana; Presbyterian Church of Ghana
- Website: Accra Ridge Church

History
- Founded: 1936; 90 years ago

The Accra Ridge Church is an English-speaking inter-denominational Protestant church based in the residential neighbourhood of Ridge in Accra, Ghana. The church is affiliated to the Anglican Diocese of Accra, Methodist Church Ghana and the Presbyterian Church of Ghana. The church also has branches in the suburbs of Tudu and Manet. The church is also the owner of the Ridge Church School, an independent and parochial preparatory day basic school located on the chapel premises.

== History ==
Records indicate that the idea for a church for European expatriates dates back to either 1935 or 1936. The first chaplain was appointed in 1936. In a 1954 church pamphlet, it was stated that "The Ridge Church originated in 1935 due to the community of worship desired by a number of residents from the residential area of Accra, known as Ridge." A Minute Book from that period reads,

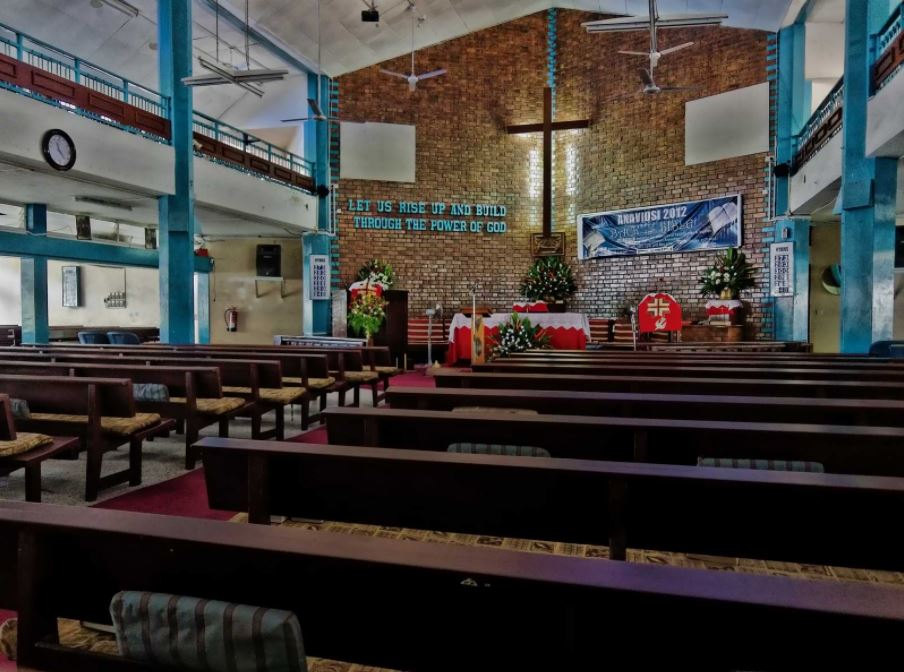
The Chapel Sanctuary

“On Monday, 18th January 1937, a meeting was held in the European Chaplaincy of members of the Congregation of the European Church. There were 19 members of the congregation present and the Chaplain, Rev. W.G. Howard". At this meeting, a committee was formed "to be responsible for the organization and administration of the Chaplaincy services and finance", and thus began what has now become the present Church Council. The initiative in establishing this Church came from a number of Europeans, mainly in Government service and large Anglicans who wanted a service in English and of simpler pattern than that available at Holy Trinity Cathedral. This development was supported by the then Bishop of Accra, Bishop Aglionby. The first Chaplain was Rev. W.G. Harward, appointed by the (Anglican) Society for Propagation of the Gospel, which supported similar chaplaincies in various parts of the world. (As a matter of interest, it may be mentioned that Mr. Harward-as Canon Harward- later became the Headmaster of Adisadel). So the Church began as an English-speaking congregation, with vigorous lay participation from its inception. Although the Ridge started as an Anglican congregation, Rev. H.H.G. Macmillan of the Scottish Mission and Rev. M.B. Taylor, Chairman of the Methodist Church, conducted services at the Church from time to time, and the time the congregation moved to its present site, it had begun to assume its present interdenominational character. In due course, this development was finalized by the appointment of honorary Methodist and Presbyterian Chaplain, and the adoption of an interdenominational constitution.”

The original church started its services in a government-rented wooden building in the same area which is now the office location for the Labour Department, Youth Development and Youth Employment Center. Half of the original wooden structure served as a manse for the chaplain. A concrete chapel-the old church, which has now been demolished, was completed in 1946. Due to increasing numbers, a new chapel was constructed in 1968 a southerly extension was added in 1986 to coincide with the Golden Jubilee anniversary of the church.

== Church hierarchy and groups ==
At any given time, the church hosts three chaplains from the Anglican, Methodist and Presbyterian denominations. The church groups include the Accra Ridge Church (ARC) Choir, the Evangelism Committee which engages in outreach through breakfast meetings, film, testimony and Tract Sundays. Others include Sidepersons/Ushers, Men's Fellowship as well as the Women's Fellowship, the ARC Youth Fellowship and Sunday School. There is also Mission 50+, a group targeting the aged for spiritual nurture and engaging in activities such as food sales.

== Notable congregants ==
- Agnes Aggrey-Orleans, diplomat
- James Aggrey-Orleans, civil servant and diplomat; High Commissioner of Ghana to the UK ( 1997–2001)
- Nana Akufo-Addo, former President of Ghana
- Rebecca Akufo-Addo, former First Lady of Ghana
- Jacob Amekor Blukoo-Allotey, pioneering pharmacologist at the University of Ghana Medical School
- Essi Matilda Forster, first Ghanaian female lawyer
- L. J. Chinery-Hesse, parliamentary draftsman, Solicitor-General and Acting Attorney General (1979)
- Mary Chinery-Hesse, international civil servant and the first woman Chancellor of the University of Ghana
- Adukwei Hesse, physician-academic, tuberculosis control expert, prison reform advocate and Presbyterian minister
- Afua Adwo Jectey Hesse, First Ghanaian woman paediatric surgeon
- Amon Nikoi, Governor, Bank of Ghana (1973–77); Finance Minister (1979–81)
- Gloria Amon Nikoi, first Ghanaian woman Foreign Minister
- Nat Nunoo-Amarteifio, Mayor of Accra, 1994 - 1998
- Jake Obetsebi-Lamptey, politician, television and radio producer and advertising businessman
- J. V. L. Phillips, civil servant; Commissioner for Lands and Mineral Resources (1966–1968); Commissioner for Industries and Ghana Industrial Holdings (1968–1969)
