= Emmanuel Quaye Archampong =

Ghanaian academic and surgeon (1933–2021)

Emmanuel Quaye Archampong CV
- Born: Emmanuel Quaye Archampong; 12 October 1933; Accra, Gold Coast
- Died: 14 November 2021 (aged 88); Korle-Bu Teaching Hospital, Accra
- Occupation: Academic
- Spouse: Catherine Awula-Ata Konotey-Ahulu

Academic background
- Education: UCL Medical School, University of London; University College of the Gold Coast; Accra Academy

Professor Emmanuel Quaye Archampong, CV (10 October 1933 - 14 November 2021) was a Ghanaian surgeon and academic. He was an emeritus professor of the College of Health Sciences University of Ghana Medical School, University of Ghana, Legon.

He was an honorary fellow of the American College of Surgeons, a fellow of the Royal College of Surgeons of England, a fellow of the Royal College of Surgeons of Edinburgh, a fellow of the International College of Surgeons, a fellow of the Ghana Academy of Arts and Sciences of which he once served as vice-president of the sciences, and a foundation fellow of the West African College of Surgeons of which he served as its president from 1997 to 1999. He was also a member and once president of the West African Society of Gastroenterologists.

== Early life and education ==
Archampong was born on 12 October 1933 in Accra, Greater Accra Region. He had his early education at Bishop's Boys' School in Accra. He had his secondary education at the Accra Academy from 1947 to 1951, there some of his contemporaries included Emmanuel Noi Omaboe; a former minister of state in the NLC government. He continued at the University of Ghana which was then known as the University College of the Gold Coast where he studied the natural sciences from 1952 to 1955. He left for England in 1955 to study medicine at the faculty of basic medical sciences, University College, London, University of London where he was awarded his BSc special (hons) in anatomy in 1958. He continued his studies at the UCL Medical School in October 1958, graduating in November 1961 with his bachelor of medicine and bachelor of surgery certificate; MB, BS (London) with honours and a number of distinctions thereby becoming a Licentiate of the Royal College of Physicians, London. He read for the primary and final fellow of both the Royal College of Surgeons of Edinburgh and the Royal College of Surgeons of England. In 1966 he was elected a fellow of the Royal College of Surgeons of Edinburgh and the Royal College of Surgeons of England.

In 1971 while a lecturer at the University of Ghana, he won a Commonwealth Medical Fellowship Award to further his studies in surgery at the UCL Medical School. His research was in the area of colorectal surgery he doubled as an honorary senior lecturer in surgery at the UCL Medical School surgical unit. He was awarded his Master of Surgery degree of the university of London in 1974 for his research on transport of fluid and electrolytes through the human colonic mucosa. He consequently became the first Ghanaian to earn a master's degree in surgery.

== Career ==
=== Early medical practice ===
In 1961 Archampong joined the staff of the medical unit of the University College Hospital as a house physician. In 1962 he moved to the surgical unit of the hospital to work as a house surgeon. In 1963 he was employed by the Watford Aid District Peace Memorial Hospital (now incorporated into Watford General Hospital), Hertfordshire to work as a senior house officer. He was also senior officer at the Leicester General Hospital and Royal Infirmary (now Leicester General Hospital), Leicester from 1963 to 1964. He served as the registrar of the Queen Elizabeth II Hospital, Welwyn Garden City, Hertfordshire from 1966 to 1967.

=== Academia ===
He returned to Ghana in 1967 and joined the teaching staff of the University of Ghana Medical School as a registrar and soon after as a lecturer in the department of surgery. He was elevated to senior lecturer status in 1972 after completing his post graduate studies in London. In 1976 he became an associate professor at the University of Ghana Medical School and also a fellow of the Ghana Academy of Arts and Sciences. In 1978, he achieved the rank of full professor. He spent a year as a visiting professor in the department of surgery of the health sciences centre of the University of Manitoba, Winnipeg, Canada from 1980 to 1981 working in the area of Gastroenterology. Upon his return to Ghana in 1981, he was appointed head of the department of surgery. Three years later he was appointed Dean of the University of Ghana Medical School. In 1989, his appointment as dean of the medical school was renewed to 1994. He simultaneously held the positions of head of the department of surgery and dean of the medical school for the next seven years. His period of service as dean of the medical school from 1984 to 1994 is currently the longest period of occupancy of the role .

In the field of surgery and medical education, Archampong has served on many national and international committees. He has served as an external examiner in several medical schools on the African continent. He also examined for the Royal College of Surgeons of England in Accra and in London.

== Honours ==
Archampong is a recipient of national honours in Ghana and Senegal. In 2006 he was a recipient of the Order of the Volta award (companion civil division).

On 4 October 2015 he was awarded Honorary Fellowship in the American College of Surgeons. He together with five other surgeons from Australia, India, France, Argentina and Barbados were awarded at the October 4 Convocation.

A citation was presented to him during the occasion and it read:

"A Fellow of the Royal Colleges of Surgeons in England and Edinburgh, Professor Archampong is a highly regarded clinician and clinical investigator, a consummate bedside teacher, and a mentor to generations of West African surgeons.

He has, by his dedicated application and singular devotion, made significant contributions to the development of postgraduate medical education in West Africa in the areas of appropriate, affordable and accessible surgical practices, and in the acquisition of hands-on skills in surgical manpower development.

Blessed with a charming disposition and exemplary character, Professor Archampong personifies the true breed of the West African surgical personality."

== Selected works ==
Archampong has authored and co-authored articles in a number journals in the field of surgery and on medical education; he has also contributed to several books in these fields. He together with two colleagues edited a significant international text book in surgery which emphasizes the African experience. Some of his works are as follows;

- (contrib.) Medicine for African Students, (edited by Eldryd Parry, Blackwell, Oxford, 1976);
- (contrib.) Modern Development in Surgery (edited by Chondrie, Nagpur Press, Nagpur, India, 1976);
- Badoe, E. A.; Archampong, E. Q.; Jaja, J. O. (1984) [1986]. Principles and Practice of Surgery, Including Pathology in the Tropics (1st ed.). African Books Collective Ltd. ISBN 978-9964-1-0324-8.
- Medical education and national development in Africa, (1990);
- Breast Cancer in Ghana, (1990).

== Personal life ==
Archampong married Catherine Awula-Ata Konotey-Ahulu in 1963. Together they have twelve grandchildren and five children; three boys and two girls. His hobbies include music, gardening and lawn tennis. Archampong passed on Saturday, 14 November 2021 at the Korle-Bu Teaching Hospital, Accra.
