= Henry Satorius Bannerman =

Ghanaian medical doctor and politician

Henry Satorious Bannerman

Member of the Ghana Parliament for Ashiedu Keteke
- In office 29 August 1969 – 13 January 1972
- Preceded by: Emmanuel Kwamina Crentsil
- Succeeded by: Samuel Odoi-Sykes

Personal details
- Born: 5 July 1918 (age 108) Accra, Gold Coast
- Party: United Nationalist Party
- Education: Mfantsipim School; Achimota College; University of Edinburgh; London School of Hygiene and Tropical Medicine, University of London
- Occupation: Politician
- Profession: Medical Doctor

Henry Satorius Bannerman was a Ghanaian medical practitioner and a politician. He once served as president of the Ghana Medical Association, president of the Commonwealth Medical Association and a member of the executive council of the University of Ghana Medical School. As a politician, he was the national chairman of the United Nationalist Party and served as a member of parliament for the Ashiedu Keteke constituency during the second republic. He together with Alex Hutton-Mills were the only UNP candidates elected into parliament in the 1969 parliamentary election.

== Early life and education ==
Bannerman was born on 5 July 1918 in Accra. He was educated at Mfantsipim School and Achimota College all in Ghana. He proceeded to the United Kingdom to study at the University of Edinburgh, Scotland and the London School of Hygiene and Tropical Medicine, a constituent college of the University of London, London, England.

== Career ==
Bannerman joined the Gold Coast Boxing Board of Control and became a steward from 1954 to 1957. He joined the Centre for Civil Education in 1967 until 1969 and was a member of the Press Council from 1968 to 1969. That same period (between from 1968 to 1969), he was appointed as a member of the Accra Hospitals Management Committee. He became the president of the Ghana Medical Association from 1970 to 1974 and doubled as president the Commonwealth Medical Association from 1972 to 1974.

== Politics ==
Bannerman was a member of the constituent assembly from 1968 to 1969. He was a founding member, chairman and leader of the United Nationalist Party. In 1969 he was elected as a member and parliament representing the Ashiedu Keteke constituency. In 1970 there was a merger of the various opposition parties to form the Justice Party. He was a founding member and the deputy leader of the party. He remained in parliament until 1972 when parliament was suspended following the overthrow of the Busia government.

== Personal life ==
Bannerman married Mercy Blankson in 1950. Together they had five children; three daughters and two sons. His hobbies were swimming and cinematography.

== See also ==
- List of MPs elected in the 1969 Ghanaian parliamentary election
- Ghana Medical Association
- Busia government
