= Cornelius Odarquaye Quarcoopome =

Ghanaian academic and ophthalmologist

Cornelius Odarquaye Quarcoopome MRCS, FWACS
- Born: Cornelius Odarquaye Quarcoopome; 6 July 1924; Accra, Gold Coast
- Died: 28 August 2003 (aged 79); Cromwell Hospital, London, UK
- Education: Accra Academy; Achimota College; University of Birmingham; University of London
- Occupations: Professor, physician
- Known for
- Scientific career
- Fields: Ophthalmology
- Workplaces: University of Ghana Medical School

Cornelius Odarquaye Quarcoopome, MRCS, FWACS (6 July 1924 - 28 August 2003) was a Ghanaian physician and academic. He was an ophthalmologist and professor at the University of Ghana Medical School. He and others have been described as pioneers of the medical profession in Ghana.

== Early life and education ==
Cornelius was born on 6 July 1924 in Accra, Gold Coast. His early education begun in 1929 at the Accra Government Boys' School. He had his secondary education at the Accra Academy from 1939 to 1943. He entered Achimota College in 1944 for his pre university education. In 1947 he gained admission to further his studies at the University of Birmingham, completing in 1953. After a short spell in the Gold Coast he returned to United Kingdom in 1957 for further studies at the UCL Institute of Ophthalmology, University College of London; a constituent college of the University of London completing in 1958.

== Career ==
After his studies at the University of Birmingham, he returned to Ghana in 1954 working at the Government Medical department of Gold Coast until 1957 when he left for the United Kingdom to further his studies at the UCL Institute of Ophthalmology. He returned to Ghana in 1958 and worked at the Ministry of Health as a special grade medical officer. In 1960 he was promoted to specialist ophthalmologist at the Ministry of Health. He held this post at the ministry until 1965. He became a part-time lecturer at the Ghana Medical School (now the University of Ghana Medical School) in 1965 and a senior lecturer in 1969. He was appointed associate professor of ophthalmology in 1974. That same year he became an associate research fellow and an honorary consultant for the Ghana Institute of Clinical Genetics, and also a member of the World Health Organization Scientific Advisory Panel for Onchocerciasis Control Project of the Volta River Basin Area. He was appointed president of the Ghana Medical Association from 1978 to 1980. In 1978, he was a member of the 1978 Constitutional Commission that was intended for the drafting of the UNIGOV constitution. In 1979, he was appointed first director of the Noguchi Memorial Institute for Medical Research, University of Ghana. He was board chairman of SIC Insurance Company from 1986 to 1994. In June 1990 he was appointed the first president of the Ophthalmological Society of Ghana. He was a fellow of the West African College of Surgeons, a licentiate of the Royal College of Physicians, England, a member of the Royal College of Surgeons, London since 1953, and a member of the International Filariasis Association since 1969.

== Personal life and death ==
He married Emma Essie Dadzie on 25 August 1955. He had a total of seven children comprising five daughters and two sons. His hobbies included reading, photography, golf, computers and listening to music. He died on 28 August 2003 at Cromwell Hospital, London at the age of 79.
