= Florence Oboshie Sai-Cofie =

Ghanaian politician (born 1953)

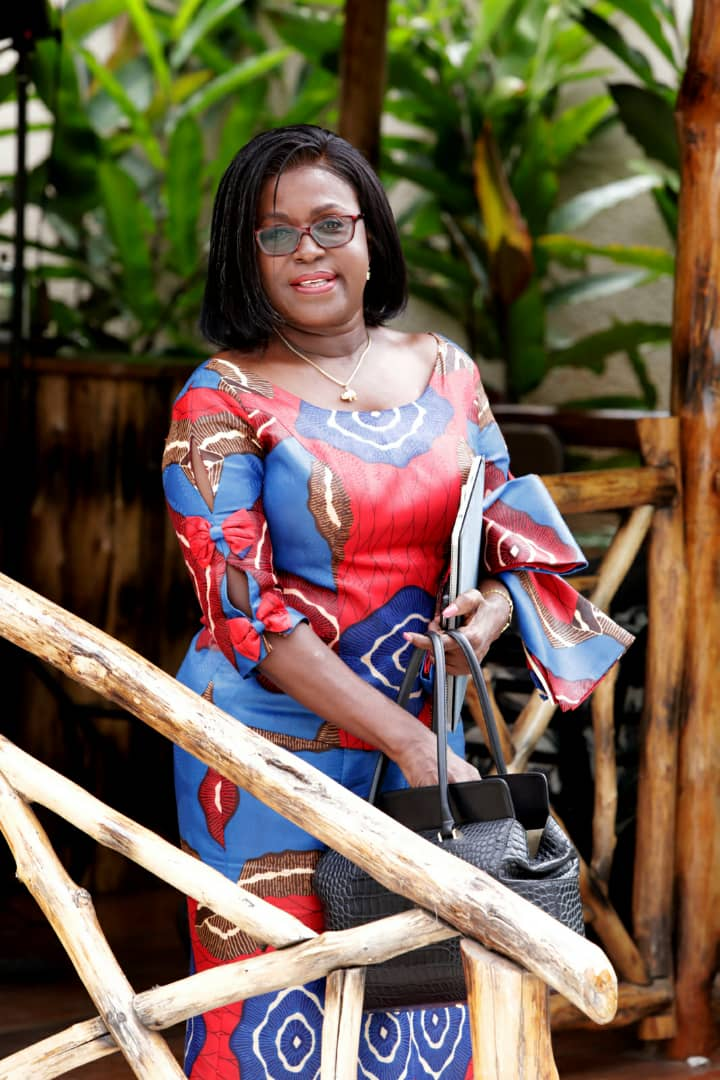

Minister of Tourism and Diaspora Relations
- In office April 2008 – 6 January 2009
- Preceded by: Stephen Asamoah Boateng

Minister for Information and National Orientation
- In office 1 August 2007 – April 2008
- President: John Kufuor
- Preceded by: Kwamena Bartels
- Succeeded by: Stephen Asamoah Boateng

Deputy Minister for Information and National Orientation
- In office 2006 – 31 July 2007
- President: John Kufuor

Personal details
- Born: Florence Oboshie Sai; 6 April 1953 (age 73) Accra, Ghana
- Parent: Fred T. Sai (father)
- Education: University of Ghana
- Occupation: Media executive; Government Official

Florence Oboshie Sai-Cofie (née Sai; born 6 April 1953), is a Ghanaian politician and a media executive. She is a communication specialist with over 20 years experience in governance, diplomacy and international relations, media relations and reproductive health advocacy. She was a deputy chief of staff in the Kufuor administration until she was appointed deputy minister. During the second term of President John Kufuor, she was deputy minister at the Ministry of Information from 2006 to 31 July 2007.

On 1 August 2007, she served as Minister of Information and National Orientation under President Kufuor's administration succeeding Kwamina Bartels. She subsequently served as Minister of Tourism and Diaspora relations, and she held the position of board chair of the Ghana Airports Company. In 2021, she was appointed as President Akufo-Addo's Special Advisor on Media and Strategic Communications.

== Early life and education ==
Florence Cofie was born on 6 April 1953 in Accra to Professor Fred T. Sai, a Ghanaian academic and family health physician who co-founded the Planned Parenthood Association of Ghana in 1967, and Florence Aleeno Sai (née Dzani). She is the first of six children. She started her education at the Ridge Church School in Accra and continued to Aburi Girls' Secondary School to study O-Levels (1964-1969) and moved to Achimota School for her A-Levels (1969-1971). She obtained a bachelor's degree in Sociology from the University of Ghana, Legon in 1974.

== Career ==
Sai-Cofie started her career as the personal assistant to the Chief Executive of Ghana film industry. From November 1975 to June 1978, she was the administrative manager for VEC Transport & Company Limited, based in Tema, Ghana.

In 1979, Sai-Cofie moved to the United States and began working at Afam Concept Chicago as a regional sales and marketing director. In 1989, Sai-Cofie returned to Ghana and engaged in several enterprises including a popular confectionery called Osibix Confections. She co-founded Mediatouch Productions in 1992, an advertising and production company.

Her firm created content and developed the first Ghanaian participation and current affairs talk show. Sai-Cofie was the presenter of the show popularly known as Straight Talk. Between September 1996 and December 2000, Sai-Cofie was also the Africa representative for the European Market Research Centre, where she conducted market research analysis and advised the head office in Brussels on the African market situation.

== Political career ==
After John Agyekum Kufuor won the December 2000 elections, between 2001 and 2004, she worked in the Office of the President, as a Special Assistant to the President, where she was a major contributor to presidential communication, public relations, speeches and interviews. She was then promoted to Deputy Chief of Staff in 2004.

After a ministerial shuffle in 2006, she was moved from the office of the presidency to serve as deputy Minister for Information and National Orientation taking over from Shirley Ayorkor Botchwey who had been reassigned to the ministry of foreign affairs to serve as a deputy minister. Sai-Cofie was promoted to substantive Minister for Information in July 2007. In April 2008, she was appointed Minister of Tourism and Diaspora relations swapping places with Stephen Asamoah Boateng who also took over as Minister of information and National Orientation.

In 2017, she was appointed board chair of Ghana Airports Company Limited and she held this position until 2021. In his second term, President Akufo-Addo appointed Sai-Cofie as his Presidential Advisor on Media and Strategic Communications, a position which she develops and implements communication strategies for government, and provides oversight and coordination for all government communication arms.

== Personal life ==
Sai-Cofie was married to the late Wellington Komla Cofie, with whom she has two sons.

== Awards and honors ==
President Kufuor awarded Sai-Cofie the Order of the Volta on 3 July 2008.

== See also ==
- List of Ghanaian politicians
