= Mungo Miller =

American psychologist and educator

Mungo Fraser Miller (July 27, 1917—August 22, 2008) was an American psychologist and educator.

Mungo F. Miller at Lake Forest College, 1950

== Early life and education ==
Mungo F. Miller was born on July 27, 1917 in Detroit, Michigan, to E. Lillian and WIlliam J. Miller, naturalized American citizens originally from Canada. He grew up in Escanaba, Michigan, attending Escanaba High School from 1931-1935. Miller was raised in the Presbyterian faith.

Miller studied at the University of Michigan in Ann Arbor, in 1939 receiving his Bachelor of Arts degree in business administration and in 1940 receiving a Master of Arts degree in experimental psychology. While a student he worked as a statistical assistant for Michigan's department of psychology.

From 1940-1941 he pursued further graduate study at Princeton University in New Jersey. His study at Princeton was interrupted by his military service in World War II, but he returned after the war. In 1948 Miller earned a second Master's degree from Princeton and in 1952 he received his PhD. In April 1952, he completed his dissertation in the field of social psychology, "The Waukegan Study of Voter Turnout Prediction," which was published in Public Opinion Quarterly in the autumn. His PhD supervisors at Princeton were psychologists Hadley Cantril and Silvan Tomkins.

In July 1939, Miller married fellow student at the University of Michigan, Barbara Weaver Schull. The couple had children Mary Theodora and William C.

== Career ==
While a graduate student at Princeton from 1940 to 1941 and from 1947 to 1949, he also worked there, first as a tutor and teaching assistant, and in 1948–1949 as a half-time instructor of psychology. In 1948–1949 he also worked as a vocational counselor at the Stevens Institute of Technology in Hoboken, New Jersey.

During World War II, Miller began active military service from April 1941 to May 1947. He rose in the ranks of the U.S. Army from second lieutenant to captain. First he assisted the Chief of Ordinance of the War Department, then served as a classification officer at the Ordinance Replacement Training Center in Aberdeen, Maryland, then supervised military training as company commander in Aberdeen. In Summer 1942 he received further training as a student officer at the Adjutant General's School in Fort Washington, taking the Personnel Consultant's Course under supervision of psychologist Dr. Yale Nathanson. From fall 1942 to December 1944, Miller served as personnel consultant and staff psychologist of the Transportation Corps in Starkville, Mississippi and New Orleans, Louisiana. For the first half of 1945, he was executive officer and director of personnel at the U.S. Army Leave Center at Brussels, Belgium. From August to December 1945, he was assistant director of supply planning for the U.S. Mission to Belgium, Brussels. From 1946 to 1947 he was assistant military attaché of the American embassy in Brussels, Belgium, where he worked with Governor of Tennessee Gordon Browning. During his time abroad he became fluent in French.

From September 1949 to June 1952, Miller was associate professor of psychology and department chair at Lake Forest College in Lake Forest, Illinois, living in a South Campus apartment. While at Lake Forest he was director of the College's Opinion Research Center, and undertook the Waukegan voter research that culminated in his PhD dissertation. He also served as the College's veterans' advisor and adviser to the Placement Bureau (student career center). In August 1952, Miller traveled to Germany as part of the Four Point Exchange international conference on public opinion measurement. He returned to Illinois in November, 1952, and entered into private business as a consulting psychologist. Miller continued to fund the Sterling Price Williams Prize in Psychology for Lake Forest College students until 1959.

From 1956 on, Miller was a staff psychologist and then partner in the management and consulting firm of Rohrer, Hibler & Replogle (later RHR International Co.) in Milwaukee, Wisconsin. In 1958, Miller was on a self-study committee for the Society for the Psychological Study of Social Issues. In 1964, Miller was on the board of directors of the Planned Parenthood Association of Milwaukee. In 1965, Miller was president of Affiliated Psychological Services in Milwaukee, Wisconsin and a consultant to the Milwaukee Council on the Aging.

Miller was a member of the American Psychological Association, the American Association of University Professors, the American Association for the Advancement of Science, the American Statistical Association, Kappa Sigma, and Sigma Xi.

Miller passed away in New Mexico on August 22, 2008.
