= Alexander Yaw Debrah =

Alexander Yaw Debrah is a parasitology and global health researcher at the Kwame Nkrumah University of Science and Technology (KNUST) in Kumasi, Ghana. His research focuses on the molecular epidemiology of parasitic diseases, immunogenetics, and the control of neglected tropical diseases (NTDs). He serves as the Dean of the Faculty of Allied Health Sciences at KNUST and leads the Filariasis Research Group at the Kumasi Centre for Collaborative Research in Tropical Medicine (KCCR). Debrah also directs TAKeOFF, a research consortium funded by the German government, which focuses on the elimination of filarial infections in Ghana, Tanzania, and Cameroon.

== Academic appointments ==
Alexander Yaw Debrah is a graduate of KNUST who got a Bachelor of Science (Hons) in Biological Sciences and Master of Philosophy in Clinical Microbiology. In the year 2003, he received German Academic Exchange Service (DAAD) Sandwich Scholarship to study PhD in Medical Parasitology at the University of Bonn in conjunction with KNUST.

In 2007, Debrah became a lecturer in the Faculty of Allied Health Sciences at KNUST. Thereafter, he has risen in ranks as a Head of Department, Dean of Faculty of Allied Health Sciences over a period of six years, and Acting Provost of the College of Health Sciences. He is now a Professor in the Department of Medical Diagnostics of the KNUST.

== Research contributions ==
His main studies are on the molecular epidemiology of parasitic infections together with the immunogenetics of filarial diseases. Such activities comprise clinical trials which develop new methods of managing a disease. In 2020 he received an EDCTP Senior Fellowship to run a program to study adult populations in Ghana, which was valued at a budget of €50,000.

== Awards and recognition ==
- 2025: EU-EDCTP Pascoal Mocumbi Prize (EDCTP)
- 2015: Memento Research Prize (Germany)
- 2012: German Paul-Ehrlich-Society for anti-infective therapy (PEG)
- American Society of Tropical Medicine and Hygiene (ASTMH) Travel Award
