= Jaswant Wadhwani =

Ghanaian medical doctor and army officer

Brig Gen Jaswant Mante Wadhwani

Personal details
- Born: November 4, 1945 (age 81) Larteh, Gold Coast
- Spouse: Selina Wadhwani
- Children: 6
- Education: Achimota School; University of Ghana
- Profession: Medical Doctor; Soldier

Military service
- Allegiance: Ghana
- Branch/service: Ghana Army
- Rank: Brigadier General
- Commands: Commanding officer, 37 Military Hospital
- Scientific career
- Fields: Pathology
- Workplaces: University of Ghana Medical School

Brigadier General Dr. Jaswant Wadhwani (born 4 November 1945) is a Ghanaian medical doctor and a retired Senior Army Officer. He was also a former commanding officer of the 37 Military Hospital and a lecturer at the University of Ghana Medical School where he lectured Pathology.

== Education ==
Dr. Wadhwani had his secondary education at Achimota School and proceeded to the University of Ghana Medical School where he was trained as a doctor.

== Career ==
Dr Wadhwani began his career as a doctor at the Korle-Bu Teaching Hospital

Upon his retirement from the 37 Military Hospital he was appointed as the medical director of the Police Hospital in Accra
