= Accra College of Medicine =

Medical school in Ghana

Coordinates: 5.648667°N 0.140028°W

- Other names: ACM
- Type: Medical school
- Established: 2013; 13 years ago
- Affiliations: University of Ghana
- President: Afua Adwo Jectey Hesse
- Location: Accra, Greater Accra Region, Ghana

Accra College of Medicine (ACM) is a private and independent Medical School located in Accra. ACM offers a research oriented medical education that is focused towards solving Ghana and Africa’s health problems.

The school was founded in 2013 as a private and independent educational facility in Accra. ACM offers admissions to prospective students of both Ghanaian and non-Ghanaian nationalities resident in Ghana or outside Ghana. The school integrates with public and private health facilities for the advancement of medical education in Ghana.

== History ==
The Accra College of Medicine was founded in 2013 by Afua Adwo Jectey Hesse, who serves as the president of the institution and her husband; Adukwei Hesse, who serves as the vice-president of the institution.

== Admission ==
The Accra College of Medicine accepts applications from both national and non-nationals resident in Ghana and outside Ghana. For undergraduate applications, the school accepts applications from prospective students with the West African Senior School Certificate Examination (WASSCE) certificates or Senior Secondary School Certificate Examination (SSSCE) certificates, IGCSE or GCE (Cambridge) 'O' levels certificates, GCE (Cambridge) 'A' Levels certificates, Bccalauréat (French), International Baccalaureate (IB), and certificates from American High Schools.

For graduate applications, prospective students who hold university degrees can be admitted subject to certain requirements. Prospective students who hold university degrees in a science discipline qualify if they graduated with at least a second class upper. Also, prospective students who hold degrees in the Liberal Arts, have taken university level science courses and whose background qualifications would have made them eligible to be admitted into a university science program also qualify for admission based on the results of an entrance exam and an interview.

Level of entry for prospective students is determined as follows;

- Graduate students with a background in any science discipline will begin the programme as second year students while taking compulsory first year courses.
- Graduate students with a background in the Liberal Arts will begin as first year students.

== Affiliation ==
The Accra College of Medicine is affiliated to the University of Ghana and students are awarded with a MBChB degree after graduation. The school is mentored by University of Ghana School of Medicine and Dentistry.
