= David Ofori-Adjei =

Ghanaian physician (born 1949)

Professor David Ofori-Adjei
- Born: 15 April 1949 (age 76); Ghana
- Education: University of Ghana Medical School
- Years active: 1975–present
- Medical career
- Profession: Doctor
- Field: Medical Educator; Infectious Diseases
- Institutions: University Of Ghana Medical School; Editor in Chief, Ghana Medical Journal
- Research: Clinical pharmacology Pharmacogenetics; Infectious Diseases

David Ofori-Adjei (born 15 April 1949) is a Ghanaian physician, medical researcher, academic and medical journal editor. His main areas of research are clinical pharmacology, pharmacogenetics, infectious diseases such as malaria, schistosomiasis, Buruli ulcer, and HIV/AIDS and public sector pharmaceutical management. He is currently the Editor-in-Chief of the Ghana Medical Journal.

== Background ==
After completing his secondary education at the Mfantsipim School, in Cape Coast, Ghana, he enrolled at the University of Ghana Medical School in 1969 and graduated in 1975 with a MBChB. He then completed his post-graduate training in Internal Medicine at Korle Bu Teaching Hospital in Accra, and in Scotland.

He became a Fellow of the West African College of Physicians in 1983, a Fellow of the Royal College of Physicians of Edinburgh in 1994, a Fellow of the Ghana College of Physicians and a Fellow of the Ghana Academy of Arts and Sciences, as well as a Member of New York Academy of Sciences in 1997.

== Career ==
In 1982, Ofori-Adjei joined the University of Ghana as a lecturer in medicine and therapeutics at the Department of Medicine and the Centre for Tropical Clinical Pharmacology.

He was elected to the Council of the Division of Clinical Pharmacology of the International Union of Pharmacology and Clinical Pharmacology in 2000, serving until 2006. Ofori-Adjei has promoted the Rational Use of Drugs in Ghana and the development of a National Essential Drugs List with Therapeutic Guidelines in association with the Ministry of Health. He served on the United States Pharmacopoeia Convention and the International Health Advisory Panel for 10 years.

Ofori-Adjei was the director of the Noguchi Memorial Institute for Medical Research in Ghana from 1 December 1998 until 30 September 2006.

Ofori-Adjei is the Editor-in-Chief of the Ghana Medical Journal.

He is one of three program directors at the African Journal Partnership Program (AJPP). Sponsored by the US National Library of Medicine and the US John E. Fogarty International Center, the AJPP with the assistance of leading European and US medical journals, such as Lancet and the New England Journal of Medicine, in mentoring African medical journals to improve their publications and their access online to international audiences.

Ofori-Adjei is currently part of the membership committee of the World Association of Medical Editors and has been a past director of the association, a global non-profit voluntary association of editors of peer-reviewed medical journals.

He was appointed as a council member of the Committee on Publication Ethics with a term from 2017 to 2010; he is the only council member from Africa.

== Sources ==
- biography in The Lancet
