= Silas Dodu =

Ghanaian academic and cardiologist

Silas Dodu MRCP(Lond), FGA
- Born: Silas Rofino Amu Dodu; 11 December 1924; Accra, Gold Coast
- Died: 2007 (aged 82–83)
- Education: Achimota School; University of Sheffield
- Occupations: Professor, physician
- Known for
- Scientific career
- Fields: Anatomy
- Workplaces: University of Ghana Medical School

Silas Rofino Amu Dodu, MRCP(Lond), FGA (11 December 1924 – 2007) was a Ghanaian physician and academic. He was a professor of medicine, the second Dean at the University of Ghana Medical School and a pioneer cardiologist in Ghana. He and others have been described as pioneers of the medical profession in Ghana.

== Early life and education ==
Silas Rofino Amu Dodu was born on 11 December 1924 in Accra, Gold Coast (present-day Ghana), to the Very Reverend Edward Maxwell Dodu, a Presbyterian minister who served as the Moderator of the Presbyterian Church of Ghana between 1955 and 1958. His mother was Margaret Lovering Dodu (née Pinto). After attending Presbyterian mission primary school and the boarding middle school, the Salem School, Osu, he had his secondary education at Achimota School from 1932 to 1945. He obtained his medical degree from the University of Sheffield and performed research on diabetes in Ghana.

== Career ==
Dodu returned to Ghana in 1953 already a member of the Royal College of Physicians of London. According to the Ghana Medical Association; he rose to the consultant status of the Physician Specialist grade; he was special grade medical officer for four years at the Korle Bu Teaching Hospital. In 1958, he co-founded the Ghana Medical Association together with Charles Odamtten Easmon, Anum Barnor, Evans Anfom and Schandorf. He was president of the association from 1966 to 1968. In 1965 he became the first head of the department of medicine at the University of Ghana Medical School. He became the vice dean and later dean of the medical school. He joined the World Health Organization in Geneva as the chief of the cardiovascular diseases unit. He was also a founding member of the Ghana Academy of Arts and Sciences.

== Personal life ==
In 1953, he married Joan Handley, daughter of William Handley, a cutlery designer. Together they had four daughters.

== Death ==
Dodu died in 2007 at the age of 82.

== See also ==
- University of Ghana Medical School
- Ghana Academy of Arts and Sciences
