= E. A. Badoe =

Ghanaian physician and academic

E. A. Badoe was an Emeritus Professor in surgery at the University of Ghana Medical School. He was educated at Achimota School.

== University of Ghana Medical School ==
Prior to the first medical school being set up in Ghana, Badoe was one of the committee along with Alexander Kwapong and Charles Odamtten Easmon who as part of their work visited the newly opened University of Lagos and the University of Ibadan Medical Schools. He later became professor of surgery at the same medical school based on the campus of the Korle Bu Teaching Hospital in Accra.

== Other activities ==
Badoe has served in various capacities in the Ghana Medical Association and the Ghana Academy of Arts and Sciences.

== Publications ==
Badoe has published many articles related to surgery and was the lead for the first locally written surgery textbook below.

- Badoe, E. A.; Archampong, E. Q.; Jaja, J. O. (1984) [1986]. Principles and Practice of Surgery, Including Pathology in the Tropics (1st ed.). African Books Collective Ltd. ISBN 978-9964-1-0324-8.
