= Harold H. Phillips =

Ghanaian academic, lecturer and doctor

Harold Phillips
- Born: 29 May 1928; Cape Coast, Gold Coast
- Died: 2 May 1999 (aged 70); London, England, United Kingdom
- Occupation: Doctor
- Employer: University of Ghana
- Organization: University of Ghana Medical School
- Known for: President, Ghana Medical Association; Chairman, University of Cape Coast
- Relatives: J. V. L. Phillips Hugh Quarshie

Harold Hopwood Phillips (1928 — 1999) was a Ghanaian academic and doctor. He was chairman of the Ghana Medical Association and also Dean of the University of Ghana Medical School . Phillips also served as the chairman of the University of Cape Coast Council. He was the first head of the Department of Physiology of the school.

== Education ==
Phillips attended Mfantsipim School in Cape Coast, graduating in 1946. He went to London in 1952 after completing a science degree at the University College of the Gold Coast (now the University of Ghana) to attend medical school at the London Hospital on a government scholarship. In 1954, he won a scholarship from the hospital to undertake additional study and was awarded a B.Sc in Physiology in 1955. He was graduated M.B, B.S in 1958 and was awarded his Ph.D. in Physiology from Queens University in Kingston, Ontario in Canada in 1972.

== Professional life ==
Phillips was recruited by the Government of Ghana while undergoing post graduate studies in medicine at Temple University in Philadelphia, USA to help establish and lead the Physiology department of the fledgling University of Ghana Medical School in Accra. He went on to become the third Dean of the medical school, and an Associate Professor of Physiology. He resigned from the medical school in 1980, but continued to lecture on a part-time basis. He set up his private practice - Phillips Clinic, an out-patient clinic in 1982 in East Cantonments in Accra, Ghana.

He was also chairman of the Ghana Medical Association between 1986 and 1990.

He was also made chairman of the University of Cape Coast in the late 1990s.

== Personal life ==
Phillips was born at Cape Coast and died in London in 1999. His father was William Reginald Phillips and his mother Beatrice Phillips (ter Meulen). He had four sons with his wife Gladys. One of his brothers was J. V. L. Phillips who was the chairman of Volta Aluminium Company, and was an uncle of Hugh Quarshie.
