= Federal University of Health Science and Technology Tsafe =

Federal/public university in Tsafe, Zamfara, Nigeria

- North western region Tsafe, Zamfara; Nigeria

Information
- Type: Federal/public

The Ffederal University of Health Science and Technology Tsafe (FUHSATT) is a public university located in North western Nigeria. The university was established on the 13 May 2024. The pioneer class of 355 spread across forty undergraduate programs. The university is located in Tsafe. The headquarters is in the town of Chafe. The university was founded by Tinubu Administration as part of the newly--established Health Science University.

== Faculty and colleges ==
- Clinical science
- Allied Health Science
- Basic medical science
- Biotechnology
- Computing science
- Sciences.
- College of post graduate studies

== Courses ==
- Medicine and surgery
- human anatomy
- Medical biochemistry
- Pathology
- Physiotherapy
- pharmacology and therapeutic
- community medicine
- Paedratics
- medical physics
- Microbiology
- Bsc Biochemistry
- Science Lab technology
- Biotechnology
- biomedical Engineering
- AI and digital health
- Biostatistics
- software engineering
- nanotechnology and nano medicine
- clinical information and Data science
- administrative and hospital management
- Alternative medicine

== Administration ==
The pioneer vice chancellor is Ibrahim Adamu Yakasai. He is.a professor of obstetrics and gynaecology. He was appointed by President Bola Ahmed Tinubu on 13 August 2025. The registrar is Hamisu Yusuf yelwa. The university librarian is Sheu Aminu Liman. The chancellor is Bishop Mathew Hassan.
