= Kwan Aij-lie =

Indonesian neurosurgeon

- Born: Kwan Aij-lie; Indonesia
- Education: Kaohsiung Medical University (MD, MPH)
- Occupation: Neurosurgeon
- Notable work: In 2022 she was elected President of the International College of Surgeons,
- Awards: In 2021 she was awarded the Taiwanese foreign ministry's Friend of Foreign Service Medal.
- Honours: She was the first female neurosurgeon in Taiwan.

Kwan Aij-lie (Chinese: 關皚麗) is an Indonesian neurosurgeon. She is the President of the International College of Surgeons.

== Biography ==
Kwan was born in Indonesia. She received a master's degree in healthcare management and her doctorate from Kaohsiung Medical University. She was the first female neurosurgeon in Taiwan.

She teaches at Kaohsiung Medical University.

In 2022 she was elected President of the International College of Surgeons, she was the first woman to hold the position.

== Awards and recognition ==
In 2021 she was awarded the Taiwanese foreign ministry's Friend of Foreign Service Medal.
