= Ghana Medical Journal =

The Ghana Medical Journal is a quarterly open-access peer-reviewed medical journal from Ghana. It is published by the Ghana Medical Association and the current editor-in-chief is David Ofori-Adjei. The journal is under the African Health Journals Partnership Project that is funded by the United States National Library of Medicine and the John E. Fogarty International Center. Full text of published articles are available on the journal's website and through African Journals OnLine and PubMed Central.

== Official site ==
- Official website
