= Ghana Medical and Dental Council =

Government agency in Ghana

MDC
- Ghana Medical and Dental Council

Agency overview
- Jurisdiction: Republic of Ghana
- Headquarters: Accra, Ghana
- Agency executive: Dr Kofi Adadey, Chairman
- Website: Official Website

The Ghana Medical and Dental Council is an agency of the Ghana government responsible for regulating the standards of training and practice of medicine and dentistry in Ghana. It is located in Accra the capital city of Ghana.

== See also ==
- Ghana Medical Association
- University of Ghana Medical School
- Ministry of Health
