= Michael Amissah =

Ghanaian composer

Michael Kofi Amissah (born 13 June 1924) is a Ghanaian composer.

== Early life and education ==
Born in Aboso, in the Western Region of Ghana, Amissah was involved in music from a young age. He became the soloist in a church choir, and the leader of the fife band at his school in Tarkwa; this was a Catholic school where his classmates included musician and performer Lord Bob Cole. He learned to play the french horn and euphonium at the age of 18, while he was part of the Gold Mines Little Orchestra.

From 1958, Amissah studied music at the Kumasi College of Technology, where his tutors included Ephraim Amu and C. E. Graves. During his studies, the college's music department was moved to Winneba. After the move, Amissah was awarded an ABRSM licentiate diploma (LRSM). He later enrolled on a newly created two-year diploma course on African music at the Institute of African Studies at the University of Ghana. He undertook further studies in Rome, gaining a bachelor's degree in sacred music and a master's degree in music.

== Composition ==
Many of Amissah's compositions have been sacred music, such as psalms, hymns, or mass settings. He has also composed choral and chamber music. Some of his compositions have been used as signature tunes by the Ghana Broadcasting Corporation.
