= United Nationalist Party =

Former political party in Ghana

The United Nationalist Party (UNP) was a political party in Ghana during the Second Republic (1969–1972). In elections held on 29 August 1969, the UNP won 2 out of 140 seats in the National Assembly.
