= Christian Agyare =

Ghanaian Professor

Prof. Christian Agyare
- Born: Koneyaw, Ashanti Region, Ghana
- Citizenship: Ghanaian
- Education: Kwame Nkrumah University of Science and Technology (BPharm, MPharm); University of Münster (Dr. rer. nat.)
- Scientific career
- Fields: Pharmaceutical microbiology; Natural products, ethnopharmacology
- Workplaces: Kwame Nkrumah University of Science and Technology

Professor Christian Agyare is a Ghanaian pharmacist and professor of pharmaceutical microbiology and natural products at the Kwame Nkrumah University of Science and Technology (KNUST). He is the current and 13th Vice-Chancellor of KNUST, having previously served as Provost of the College of Health Sciences from 2020 to 2026.

== Early life and education ==
Agyare was born in Koneyaw in the Ashanti Region of Ghana. He attended Armed Forces Basic Schools in Kumasi before proceeding to Prempeh College. He obtained a Bachelor of Pharmacy (BPharm) and a Master of Pharmacy (MPharm) from Kwame Nkrumah University of Science and Technology before earning a Doctor rerum naturalium (Dr. rer. nat.) degree from the University of Münster, Germany. He later undertook postdoctoral research at the University of California, San Francisco, and the Novartis Institute for Biomedical Research in Boston.

== Career ==
Agyare joined the Faculty of Pharmacy and Pharmaceutical Sciences at KNUST as a lecturer in 2003. He was promoted to Senior Lecturer in 2011, Associate Professor in 2016, and later became Professor of Pharmaceutical Microbiology.

In August 2020, he was appointed Provost of the College of Health Sciences at KNUST. On 13 May 2026, the Governing Council of KNUST appointed him as the university's 13th Vice-Chancellor for a four-year term beginning on 1 August 2026, succeeding Professor Rita Akosua Dickson.

== Research ==
Agyare's research focuses on pharmaceutical microbiology, antimicrobial resistance, medicinal plants, ethnopharmacology, natural products, parasitology and wound healing.

== Awards and recognition ==
Agyare received the Academic Pharmacist of the Year award from the Pharmaceutical Society of Ghana in 2025.
