= George Akosa =

Ghanaian politician

MP for Mampong
- In office 7 January 1993 – 6 January 1997
- President: Jerry John Rawlings

Personal details
- Born: Mampong, Ashanti Region Ghana)
- Party: National Democratic Congress
- Occupation: Politician

George Akosa is a Ghanaian politician, a member of the first Parliament of the fourth Republic representing the Mampong constituency in the Ashanti region.

== Early life and education ==
George was born at Mampong in the Ashanti Region of Ghana.

== Politics ==
George was elected into parliament on the ticket of the National Democratic Congress (NDC) during the December 1992 Ghanaian parliamentary election for the Mampong Constituency in the Ashanti Region of Ghana. As the only contesting parliamentary candidate for the constituency, he polled 6,166 votes which represented 100% valid votes cast. He lost to Elizabeth Nicol in the 1996 NDC Parliamentary Primaries.

== Personal life ==
George Akosa is a Christian.
