= College of Health Sciences (KNUST) =

Coordinates: 6.6721°N 1.5685°W

- Established: 2005
- Provost: Prof. Christian Agyare
- Location: Kumasi Campus, Ashanti
- Website: http://chs.knust.edu.gh/

The College of Health Sciences of the Kwame Nkrumah University of Science and Technology comprises the Faculties of Allied Health Sciences, Pharmacy and Pharmaceutical Sciences, School of Medical Sciences, School of Dentistry, School of Veterinary Medicine and the Kumasi Centre for Collaborative Research in tropical medicine (KCCR). It attained the status of a college by a change in the University Statutes that came into being in January 2005. Prior to this time, the components of the college existed separately as the Faculty of Pharmacy and School of Medical Sciences.

== Provost's Office ==
- Provost - Professor Christian Agyare
- Registrar - H.H Akosah
- College Accountant - Johnson Owusu
- College Librarian - Victor Teye
- Assistant Registrar - Ida Saeed
- Administrative Assistant -Nana Yeboah

== Faculties & Departments ==
=== Faculty of Allied Health Sciences ===
The Allied Health Faculty consist of:

- Department of Medical Laboratory Technology
- Department of Nursing
- Department of Sports and Exercise Science
- Department of Sonography

=== Faculty of Pharmacy and Pharmaceutical Sciences ===
- Department of Clinical and Social Pharmacy
- Department of Herbal Medicine
- Department of Pharmaceutical Chemistry
- Department of Pharmaceutics
- Department of Pharmacognosy
- Department of Pharmacology

=== School of Medicine and Dentistry ===
The School of Medicine and Dentistry was created to train Physicians, Medical Scientists and Medical Laboratory Technologists. Students enrolled take a 3-year course upon successful completion they are awarded a BSc in Human Biology. An additional 3-year program continues for the MBCHB or the BDS. At present, the School concentrates on training Physicians at the undergraduate level, and Medical Scientists at the postgraduate levels. The School is involved in the training of postgraduate doctors for the professional membership and fellowship certification of the Ghana College of Physicians and Surgeons and the West African Postgraduate Medical College

The Medical School consist of the following:

- Anesthesiology and Intensive Care
- Department of Anatomy
- Department of Behavioural Sciences
- Department of Child Health
- Department of Clinical Microbiology
- Department of Community Health
- Department of EENT
- Department of Medicine
- Department of Molecular Medicine
- Department of Obstetrics and Gynaecology
- Department of Pathology
- Department of Physiology
- Department of Radiology
- Department of Surgery

=== School of Veterinary Medicine ===
The School of Veterinary Medicine, was also establishment in 2009. It consist of:

- Veterinary Anatomy and Physiology
- Veterinary Pathology
- Veterinary Pharmacology and Toxicology
- Veterinary Public Health, Food Hygiene and Food Safety
- Veterinary Clinical Studies

== Research ==
- Kumasi Centre for Collaborative Research into Tropical Medicine
