= Planned Parenthood Association of Ghana =

Non-governmental organisation

The Planned Parenthood Association of Ghana (PPAG) is a volunteer-based non-governmental organization affiliated to International Planned Parenthood Federation, established in 1967. It provides Sexual and Reproductive Health (SRH) services in Ghana. PPAG has a team of 103 staff, over 1,000 volunteers, 300 peer educators, 551 community-based distributors (CBDs) and a youth wing call Youth Action Movement(YAM) with 810 membership of young people. PPAG also delivers services and programmes through 1,356 service points, including 11 permanent clinics, 54 mobile clinics and over 1,000 community-based service points (CBSs).

A comprehensive sexuality education manual for young people titled “KnowItOwnItLiveIt” has been launched with a call on parents to intensify sex education among their children to minimise sexually transmitted infections (STIs) and teenage pregnancy in the country.

The operations of PPAG over the last few decades have been built on three key areas. They focus on access to information on HIV/AIDS, safe abortion, and adolescent reproductive health. PPAG has been able to empower women and adolescent girls on issues of child marriages, adolescent pregnancy, and safe abortion through partnerships with CSOs, community-based education programmes and peer education.

As part of its work, the Planned Parenthood Association of Ghana has over the decades also continued to engage relevant stakeholders in its efforts to break the myth and misconception about family planning. In July 2026, PPAG partnered with the United Nations Population Fund (UNFPA) to organise a Youth Open Day on the theme 'The Clinic is Yours'. The initiative held in Keta, Volta Region was part of efforts by PPAG to enable adolescents in the Region to have access to free sexual and reproductive health and rights services without fear or intimidation.

== Digital Contact Center ==
PPAG has established a digital contact center named 'Yenkasa' which means ‘lets Talk’ in the Akan dialect. It is a platform for Sexual and Reproductive Health Rights (SRHR) information, counselling and referrals for young people in particular and the general public as a whole. 'Yenkasa Call center' focuses on meeting young people changing SRHR needs and challenges of young people, including Sexual and Gender Based Violence (SGBV), sexually transmitted Infections, unplanned pregnancy, mental health needs among others in four Ghanaian languages; Ga, Twi, Ewe, Dagbani and English.
