= West African College of Surgeons =

West African medical college

- Abbreviation: WACS
- Formation: 1960; 66 years ago
- Type: Professional Association
- Headquarters: Lagos, Nigeria
- Location: West Africa
- Official language: English; French
- Website: West African College of Surgeons

The West African College of Surgeons is a professional organization that promotes education, training, examinations and research in surgery in Africa. The college is the first organization to organize surgical subspecialty training in the region. It awards diploma of fellowship in surgery and is one of two bodies that accredits institutions to train surgical residents in member countries.

== History ==
The Association of Surgeons of West Africa (ASWA) was established so that West African surgeons could discuss the unique challenges that they faced and foster cooperation among the region's first crop of foreign trained surgeons. It started with 15 representatives across the field of general surgery, anaesthesia, otorhinolaryngology, obstetrics and gynecology. The first council meeting took place at the University of Ibadan on 3 December 1960. The university hosted the college's first conference the next year.

In 1969, ASWA established the West African College of Surgeons with the objective of providing postgraduate surgical training opportunities. The college was to exist side by side with the Association of Surgeons of West Africa. By 1973, the Association of Surgeons of West Africa was dissolved and its funds and responsibilities were shifted to the West African College of Surgeons. In January 1975, the organization became a constituent college of the newly created West African Postgraduate Medical College (WAPMC). The sister institution of the West African College of Surgeons is the West African College of Physicians.

Member countries of WACS are not limited to the West African region, Angola, Cameroun and Congo who are considered to be outside the region have been affiliated with the organization.

=== Examinations ===
The schedule towards the award of a fellowship in one the faculties usually took a period of 4–6 years depending on the availability of teachers and the choice of specialty. The program is split into Part I and Part II. The part I exam is conducted after two years of entry into the program and the completion of rotational training in most disciplines of surgery and in accredited institutions. The second examination is conducted two years after the first exam when the candidate has chosen a specialty.

=== List of presidents ===
- Samuel Manuwa 1961 - 1963
- Charles Odamtten Easmon 1963 - 1965.
- Horatio Orishejolomi Thomas 1965 - 1967
- Alfred Ellington Olu-Williams 1967 - 1969
- Emmanuel Evans-Anfom 1969 - 1971
- A. V. Nu 1971 - 1973
- D. A. J. Ohin 1973 - 1975
- Akinpelu Oludele Adesola 1975 - 1977
- J.K.M. Quartey 1977 - 1979
- K. Kotso-Nathaniels 1979 - 1981
- Toriola Feisitan Solanke 1981 - 1983
- E. A. Badoe 1983 - 1985
- V. E. Aimakhu 1985 - 1987
- Antoine Yangni Angate 1987 - 1989
- O. O. Ajayi 1989 - 1991
- D.J.O. Ffoulkes-Crabbe 1991 - 1993
- C. K. Ghartey 1993 - 1995
- Festus Aghagbo Nwako 1995 - 1997
- Emmanuel Quaye Archampong 1997 - 1999
- A. D. O. Wright 1999 - 2001
- Mamadou Gueye 2001 - 2001
- Osato Frank Giwa-Osagie 2001 - 2003 & 2003 - 2005
- E.D. Yeboah 2005 - 2007
- E. Alihonu 2007 - 2008
- O. O. Mbonu 2009 - 2011
- O. K. Ogedengbe 2011 - 2013
- Koffi Hervé Yangni-Angate 2013 - 2015
- Akinyinka Omigbodun 2015 - 2017
- King-David Terna Yawe 2017 - 2019
- Serigne Magueye Gueye 2019 - 2021
- Peter Donkor 2021 - present

== Faculties ==
The college consists of seven faculties. These include:

- Anaesthesia
- Dental Surgery
- Obstetrics & Gynaecology
- Ophthalmology
- Otorhinolaryngology
- Radiology
- Surgery.
