= International College of Surgeons =

Global professional organization

- Abbreviation: ICS
- Formation: 1935; 91 years ago
- Founder: Max Thorek
- Founded at: Geneva, Switzerland
- Purpose: Promoting excellence of surgeons and surgical specialists worldwide
- Headquarters: Chicago, United States
- Products: International Surgery
- President: Kwan Aij-lie
- Website: www.icsglobal.org

The International College of Surgeons (ICS) is a global organization dedicated to promoting excellence of surgeons and surgical specialists worldwide. It was founded in 1935 by Max Thorek and is headquartered in Chicago, Illinois.

ICS works though collaborative projects with the World Health Organization, the United Nations, and similar organizations.

The organization publishes the journal International Surgery.

It conducts conferences, meetings, and congresses in many countries of the world. It operates the International Museum of Surgical Science in Chicago.
