= University of Ghana Medical School =

Medical school in Ghana

Coordinates: 5.5394°N 0.2295°W

- Type: Medical school
- Established: 1962; 64 years ago
- Parent institution: University of Ghana, Legon
- Students: ~1000
- Location: Accra, Greater Accra Region, Ghana
- Website: smd.ug.edu.gh//

The University of Ghana Medical School also UGMS is the medical school of Ghana's first public research institution, the University of Ghana. It is currently located at the Korle Bu Teaching Hospital in Accra. The medical school was first planned in 1919, but took its first students in 1962.

== History ==
The plan to set up a medical school on the Gold Coast was drawn up after the establishment of the Korle Bu Hospital in 1919 at the time, Sir Frederick Gordon Guggisberg. The idea was abandoned after Guggisberg left office. There was renewed interest in this venture in 1951. At the behest of the Gold Coast colonial administration and the University College of the Gold Coast, a technical team from the University of London visited the Gold Coast to assess the scheme and specifications for staffing and facilities that would be required to fully operationalise a medical school. In 1952, a government-approved commission recommended the postponement of the establishment of medical school indefinitely. In 1955, the issue was revisited and the colonial government invited the University College of the Gold Coast and the Kumasi College of Technology to examine the options to start a medical school. It was decided medical courses would be introduced in a step-by-step fashion, as originally espoused by the University of London delegation in 1951. In 1956, the University Council Committee under the leadership of the institution's first principal, David Balme, was formed to suggest other avenues for founding the school. The recommendations of this committee included an annual enrollment of 20 to 25 students, establishment of four pre-clinical departments at the University College of the Gold Coast, Legon and the upgrade of the Korle Bu Hospital to a teaching hospital with its autonomous management board. By 1960, the year Ghana became a republic, there was still no pathway for implementation as Korle Bu was not equipped for clinical training and funds were unavailable for its expansion. The Nkrumah government sought technical and financial assistance from the Kennedy administration. The US government appointed a team led by physician, Paul Connerlly to review all previous assessments. This team suggested the establishment of a National Medical and Health Training Centre under which the medical school would function. The government accepted these recommendations. In 1962, the US Agency for International Development (USAID) recommended that the National Medical and Health Training Centre should have these subsidiaries: a medical school, a school of nursing; a dental school; a school of medical technology; a post graduate school; a research facilities centre.

It was planned that the medical school would be financially independent with its own council. However, the University of Ghana would be its parent institution and would award its medical degrees. The suggested curriculum would be American-based even though the Ghanaian education was modelled on the British university system. To streamline these differences, admitted sixth formers were to go through a two-year pre-medical science course prior to the actual medical training. In October 1962, the foundation class of 51 premedical students were admitted to the University of Ghana. Within a year of the programme, the American Dean informed the government that he was unable to find lecturers in the basic sciences. In February 1964, Ghana's first president decided to wholly rely on domestic sources of funding and manpower to establish the full medical school. A study tour by Alexander Kwapong, Charles Odamtten Easmon and E. A. Badoe at then newly established University of Lagos and University of Ibadan medical schools, was used as a basis for the feasibility studies.

In October 1964, 41 students enrolled in the preclinical training with a group of indigenous doctors being their lecturers. Most courses were drawn from gross anatomy and histology, taught by J.K.M Quartey and F. N. L. Engmann. Surgeons and pathologists at government hospitals in Accra taught on an adjunct basis. Later, the department of physiology was started by H. H. Philips while biochemistry was started by B. Y. A. Andoh as part of the curriculum that included basic sciences. Teaching in paraclinical departments commenced in April 1966 while those in clinical departments started in April 1967. The professoriate was almost entirely Ghanaian. The pioneering class of 39 medical students graduated in June 1969. Expatriate lecturers were recruited at the end of the first year. By the end of 1968, the Ghana medical school had become a semi-autonomous school under the University of Ghana with functions identical to other faculties of the university. It assumed a new name, the University of Ghana Medical School and its own Executive Council and School Board were assembled. The school held landmark events to celebrate and its silver jubilee in 1987 and fortieth anniversary in 2002.

The self-accounting administration was subordinate to both the board and the executive council. As a university faculty, a Dean provided academic and administrative leadership, assisted by a Vice Dean and an Executive Secretary. The first Executive Secretary of the medical school was C. K. Gbeho and Deborah Boafoh was the first Administrative Secretary. The medical school now operates through seventeen departments, namely departments of anatomy, biochemistry, physiology, chemical pathology, haematology, microbiology, pathology, pharmacology, anaesthesia, paediatrics, community health, medicine and therapeutics, obstetrics and gynaecology, psychiatry, radiology and surgery. Four out every five faculty at the school are alumni.

The school had eight department in its early years. Paraclinical departments and department heads consisted of the following:

- Department of Pharmacology led by R. Lewis with J. Blukoo Allotey as his deputy
- Department of Pathology led by W. N. Laing
- Department of Microbiology, led by S. N. Afoakwa
- Department of Surgery, led by Charles Odamtten Easmon
- Department of Medicine, led by S. R. A. Dodu
- Department of Paediatrics, led by Yaw Asirifi
- Department of Obstetrics and Gynaecology, led by K. K. Bentsi-Enchill
- Department of Community Health, led by Fred T. Sai

== School mission ==
The medical school's mission focuses on learning, research and knowledge dissemination in the national and global context. Specifically, the college aims to train:

- “A broad-based generalist practitioner with sufficient grounding for subsequent specialization
- A practitioner functionally attuned to and therefore responding aptly to the needs and exigencies of his/her environment. He/she shall attain internationally accepted standards.
- A practitioner who has participated in health care delivery while under instruction and therefore cognizant of the problems of health delivery and also an individual who accepts responsibility for self-learning and therefore readily responsive to the call for continuing education, and advocate for community health needs.”

== Learning environment ==
=== Curriculum ===
The school curriculum has gone through periodic reviews in line with national health needs and contemporary trends in medical education. In 1992, a biomedical science bachelor's degree was introduced to be conferred at the end of the para-clinical sciences course and is now a prerequisite for clinical training. The length of the medical course was reduced from seven and a half years to six year, inclusive of a year-long premedical course. A new curriculum was introduced in 2009 and two classes were simultaneously admitted: secondary school students and bachelor's degree holders in the natural sciences for the Graduate Entry Medical Programme (GEMP). The GEMP is an integrated four-year medical degree. A clinical skills and simulation centre was also established in 2009 to enhance clinical skills training. The Ghanaian government also provided a high-capacity medical library for the UGMS through budgetary support and GET Fund allocation.

=== Student enrollment ===
The first batch of students in 1964 had 41 students. By 1973, the number had risen to 53 students. In 1999, 94 students matriculated at the medical school. With two streams in 2006/07, intake rose to 195 per year. Between 2000 and 2006, student enrolled per annum effectively doubled from about 100 to 200. In 2011, enrollment was 150 per year. The school strives to achieve gender parity in its admissions, with women guaranteed a minimum of 25% of the incoming class. Women intake in the school's first class was 3 which increased steadily over the years to 71 out a total of 154 students who matriculated in 2011. This represents an increase of 2367 percentage points. Between 1969 and 2012, the medical school produced 2752 physicians, consisting of 2083 men and 669 women.

In its early days, the school reserved 5% of spots to foreign students from African countries without medical schools. From 1999, the population of international students from around the globe has been pegged at 20%. Student enrollment stood at 802 in the 2006/07. In the 2010/11 academic year, the medical school had an incoming class of 150, and rising, at least a quarter of which are women.

=== Institutional challenges ===
In the 1980s, due to an economic downturn from the structural adjustment programme in Ghana, the school faced an exodus of its faculty to institutions abroad which led to a reduction in the student intake. There is also an “internal brain drain” as result of a wage gap between clinical teaching staff and consultants in the Ministry of Health whose compensation far exceed that of the UGMS professors. The physical space for clinical training and research is also very limited. For example, the Basic Sciences Building which houses 200 students was originally built to accommodate a quarter of that number.

=== Specialist and graduate training ===
Beginning in 1972, the medical school through a variety of arrangements for postgraduate education, has trained specialists for national needs. Originally, this was carried out through the Royal Colleges of the United Kingdom, later the West African Postgraduate Medical College and now the Ghana College of Physicians and Surgeons. The Medical School has two programs: the undergraduate MBChB program for students from the Secondary School, and the Graduate Entry Medical Program for Graduate students with a Bachelor of Science degree. It has also runs the Graduate Entrance Medical Programme (GEMP) for people who did Bachelor Degrees in the natural sciences, applied sciences, engineering but not medicine.

=== Link to other health-related institutions ===
The UGMS was instrumental in the establishment of other Ghanaian and African medical schools. In 1970s, the first two batches from the School of Medical Sciences, Kwame Nkrumah University of Science and Technology, completed their training at Korle-Bu. In the 1990s and 2000s, before the Tamale hospital was upgraded to a teaching hospital, the UGMS hosted students from the School of Medicine and Health Sciences, University for Development Studies (UDS) for pre- and para-clinical and full clinical training leading to the earning of UDS degrees. Professors from the UGMS also go to the UDS from time to time to aid in teaching. A College Council that governs the institution replaced the Executive Council. The University of Ghana Dental School started in 1974 under the aegis of the UGMS, before attaining full faculty status in 1992. The Noguchi Memorial Institute for Medical Research was founded in 1979 in partnership with the UGMS. In 1994, the Ghanaian Ministry of Health (MoH) authorised a new course: the Diploma in Medical Laboratory Technology to train laboratory technicians for the country's hospitals. In the same year, the MoH collaborated with the UGMS to establish a School of Public Health that would awarded postgraduate degrees in public health, epidemiology and related fields. In 1998, the School of Allied Health Science was started for the training of laboratory scientists, physiotherapists, radiographers, medical and dental technologists and other allied health professionals. The UGMS was the progenitor of the idea to merge all the health-related schools of the University of Ghana into the first constituent college of the university - the College of Health Sciences. Upon the establishment of the College of Health Sciences in 1999, the UGMS, together with five other medical schools became a constituent college. The UGMS played a critical role in the curriculum development for the establishment of the University of Cape Coast Medical School.

== Recent developments ==
With financial assistance from the Israeli government, a state-of-the-art University Teaching Hospital on the campus of the University of Ghana, Legon was recently completed and the UGMS is in the process expanding infrastructure and access to medical education. The university has in recent years started a school of biomedical sciences and engineering. The UGMS plans to construct simulated laboratories to meet increased demand while making use of peripheral hospitals for clinical training. In the future, the medical school plans to introduce distance learning programmes for certain disciplines. Investment in the school's research portfolio in the biomedical sciences is a top priority for the university's medical school. International student tuition is the main source of the school's internally–generated funds (IGFs).

== Notable alumni ==
- Alexander A. Clerk, psychiatrist and sleep medicine specialist; Director, Stanford Center for Sleep Sciences and Medicine| (1990 – 1998)
- Adukwei Hesse, physician-academic, tuberculosis control expert, prison reform advocate and Presbyterian minister
- Clifford Nii Boi Tagoe, former Vice Chancellor, University of Ghana
- Rexford S. Ahima; Professor of Medicine, Public Health & Nursing; Bloomberg Distinguished Professor of Diabetes at Johns Hopkins University; Director, Division of Endocrinology, Diabetes & Metabolism, Johns Hopkins School of Medicine
- Afua Adwo Jectey Hesse, paediatric surgeon
- Jaswant Wadhwani, former Commanding Officer, 37 Military Hospital

== Notable faculty ==
- E. Q. Archampong, surgery
- E. A. Badoe, surgery
- S. R. A. Dodu, cardiology
- Charles Odamtten Easmon, surgery
- Emmanuel Evans-Anfom, anatomy
- Kwabena Frimpong-Boateng, cardiothoracic surgery
- Adukwei Hesse, physiology
- Afua Adwo Jectey Hesse, paediatric surgery
- J. F. O. Mustaffah, neurosurgery
- Susan Ofori-Atta, paediatrics
- Fred T. Sai, community health and social medicine
- Clifford Nii Boi Tagoe, anatomy
- Cornelius Odarquaye Quarcoopome, ophthalmology
- Jaswant Wadhwani, pathology

== Past Deans ==
- Charles Odamtten Easmon
- S. R. A. Dodu
- H. H. Phillips
- F. N. L. Engmann
- E. Q. Archampong
- S. K. Owusu
- A. S. Ayettey
- Clifford Nii Boi Tagoe
- Aaron L. Lawson
