= Ghana Medical Association =

GMA represents physicians, surgeons and dentists working throughout Ghana

- Abbreviation: GMA
- Established: 4 January 1958; 68 years ago
- Founded at: Accra
- Merger of: Gold Coast Medical Practitioners Union & British Medical Association (Ghana branch)
- Professional title: Medical association
- Headquarters: Accra, Ghana
- Coordinates: 5.539°N 0.230°W
- Members: 1700
- Official language: English
- President: Prof. Dr. (Med) Ernest Yorke
- Vice President: Dr. (Med) Arko Akoto-Ampaw
- General Secretary: Dr. (Dent) Richard Selormey
- Treasurer: Dr. (Med) Kwaku Appiagyei
- Affiliations: World Medical Association; Commonwealth Medical Association; Confederation of African Medical Associations and Societies
- Website: ghanamedassoc.org

The Ghana Medical Association (GMA) represents physicians, surgeons and dentists working throughout Ghana. It was established in 1958 and is divided into ten divisions representing each region of Ghana as at the end of 2018.

== History ==
The earliest medical organisation of medical staff was during the Gold Coast era when the Gold Coast Medical Practitioners Union was formed in 1933. This was founded by three doctors, Frederick Victor Nanka-Bruce who was the president and spokesman, C.E. Reindorf and W.A.C. Nanka-Bruce. J.E. Hutton Mills was the secretary. Following the establishment of an African government under colonial rule in 1951, a Ghana branch of the British Medical Association was formed in January 1953. This also had Nanka-Bruce as its first president. Both associations were merged to form the Ghana Medical Association on 4 January 1958. It was inaugurated by Kwame Nkrumah at the Arden Hall of the Ambassador Hotel in Accra. Charles Easmon was elected as the first president of the GMA.

== Affiliations ==
- Confederation of African Medical Associations and Societies
- Commonwealth Medical Association
- World Medical Association

== National Executive Council ==
This council meets every other month. It is made up of the following persons:

- Chairpersons of each of the divisions (numbering ten at end of 2018)
- Society of Private Medical and Dental Practitioners
- Ghana Dental Association
- Junior Doctors Society

== Publications ==
- Ghana Medical Journal

== Meetings and conferences ==
=== 66th Annual Conference 2024 ===
In November 2024, the Ghana Medical Association (GMA) held its 66th Annual General Conference in the Volta Region, focusing on improving internet access for healthcare through collaboration between the government and telecom companies. GMA President Dr. Frank Serebour highlighted telemedicine’s potential to enhance healthcare access and efficiency, especially in rural areas.

The conference also noted barriers to telemedicine, such as limited internet infrastructure and regulatory concerns. Additionally, members discussed the benefits of artificial intelligence in diagnostics and recommended establishing standards to support its integration into healthcare.

== Past presidents of the GMA ==
The president of the GMA since 2017 has been Frank Ankobea. There have been 22 past presidents as at 2018.

- Charles Easmon (1958–1962)
- J. A. Schandorf (1962–1963)
- Matthew Anum Barnor (1963–1966)
- Silas R .A. Dodu (1966–1968)
- Emmanuel Evans-Anfom (1968–1970)
- H. S. Bannerman (1970–1974)
- J. T. Glover (1974–1978)
- Cornelius Odarquaye Quarcoopome (1978–1980)
- K. Dsane-Selby (1980–1983)
- J. O. M. Pobee (1983–1986)
- Harold H. Phillips (1986–1990)
- Jonathan H. Addy (1990–1992)
- Kwame Addo-Kufuor (1992–1995)
- Sir. G. W. Brobby (1995-1997)
- J. K. Kwakye-Maafo (1997–1999)
- Agyeman Badu Akosa (1999–2001)
- Jacob Plange-Rhule (2001–2003)
- Yaw Adu-Gyamfi (2003–2005)
- Francis Adu-Ababio (2005–2007)
- E. A. Adom Winful (2007–2011)
- Kwabena Opoku-Adusei (2011–2015)
- Ebenezer Ewusi-Emmim (2015–2017)
- Frank Ankobea - (2017-2021)
- Dr. Frank Serebour - (2021 - 2025)

== See also ==
- Ghana Medical and Dental Council
