= Korle-Bu Teaching Hospital =

Hospital in Greater Accra Region, Ghana

Coordinates: 05°32′16.2″N 00°13′38.67″W

Korle Bu Teaching Hospital
- Ministry of Health

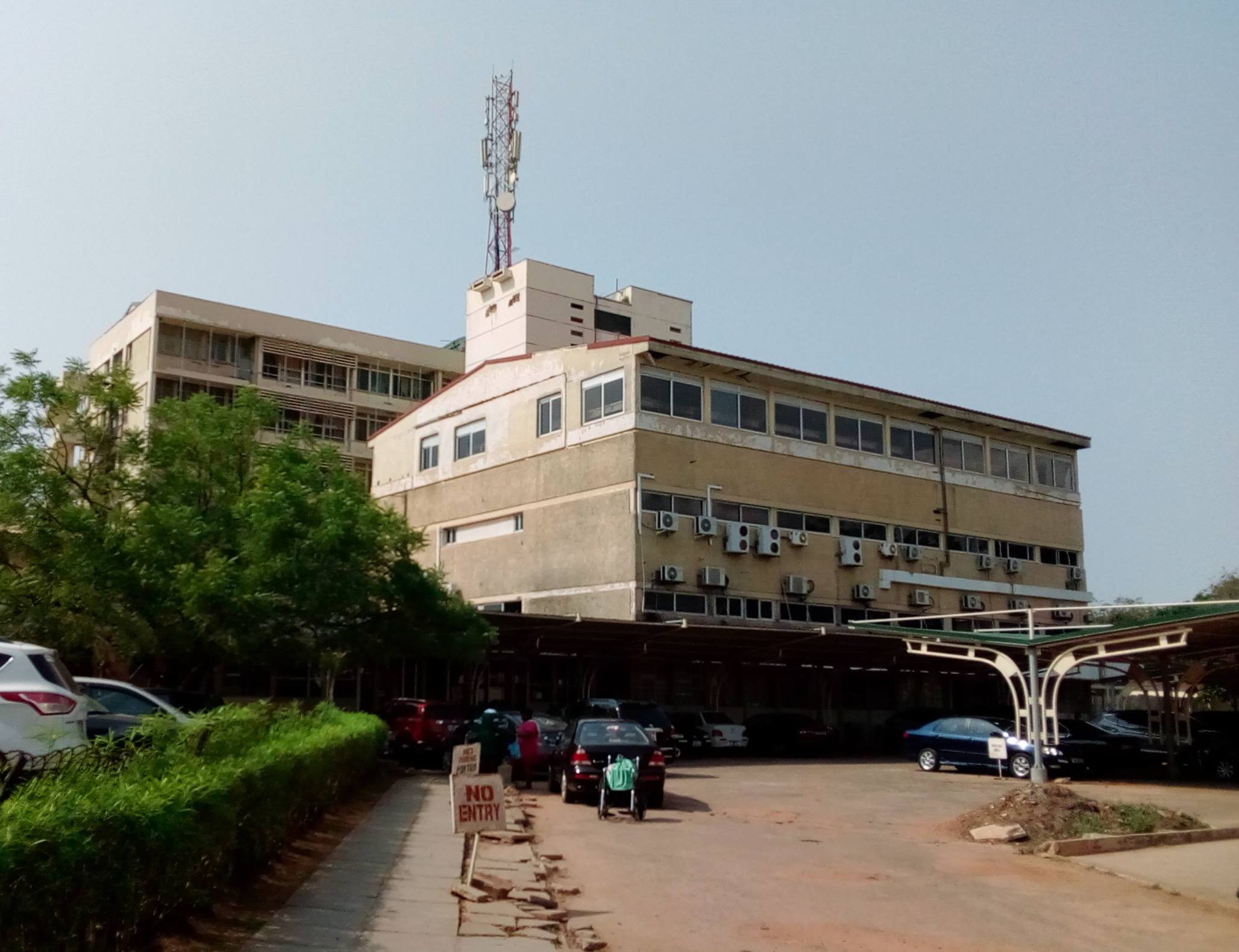

Geography
- Location: Accra, Accra Metropolis District, Greater Accra Region, Ghana

Organisation
- Care system: Public - Ghana Health Service
- Type: Teaching
- Affiliated university: University of Ghana Medical School

Services
- Emergency department: Yes
- Beds: 1600

History
- Founded: 9 October 1923

Links
- Website: KBTH
- Lists: Hospitals in Ghana

Korle-Bu Teaching Hospital (KBTH) is a public teaching hospital located in Ablekuma South district, Greater Accra Region, Ghana. It was established in 1923. It is the only public tertiary hospital in the southern part of the country. It is a teaching hospital affiliated with the medical school of the University of Ghana. In 2019, the hospital gained a licence from the Health Facilities Regulatory Agency (HeFRA), after meeting the requirement.

== History ==
Korle-Bu Teaching Hospital was established on 9 October 1923 and has grown from an initial 200-bed capacity to 2,000. It is currently the third largest hospital in Africa and the leading national referral centre in Ghana. Korle-Bu, which means in the Ga language "the valley of the Korle Lagoon", was established as a general hospital to address the health needs of the indigenous people under the administration of Sir Gordon Guggisberg, then Governor of the Gold Coast.

Population growth and the proven efficacy of hospital-based treatment caused a rise in hospital attendance in Korle-Bu. By 1953, demand for the hospital's services had escalated so high that the government was compelled to set up a task force to study the situation and make recommendations for the expansion of the hospital.

The government accepted and implemented the recommendations of the task force which resulted in the construction of new structures, such as the Maternity, Medical, Surgical and Child Health Blocks. This increased the hospital's bed capacity to 1,200.

Korle-Bu gained teaching hospital status in 1962, when the University of Ghana Medical School (UGMS) was established for the training of medical doctors.

The University of Ghana Medical School and five other constituent schools are now subsumed under the College of Health Sciences to train an array of health professionals. All the institutions of the college however, undertake their clinical training and research in the hospital.

The hospital currently has 2,000 beds and 17 clinical and diagnostic Departments/Units. It has an average daily attendance of 1,500 patients and about 250 patient admissions.

Clinical and diagnostic departments of the hospital include Medicine, Child Health, Obstetrics and Gynaecology, Pathology, Laboratories, Radiology, Anaesthesia, Surgery, Polyclinic, Accident Centre and the Surgical/Medical Emergency as well as Pharmacy. Other departments include Pharmacy, Finance, Engineering, General Administration.

The hospital also provides specialisation in various fields such as Neuro-surgery, Dentistry, Eye, ENT, Renal, Orthopaedics, Oncology, Dermatology, Cardiothoracic, Radiotherapy, Radio diagnosis, Paediatric Surgery and Reconstructive Plastic Surgery and Burns.

The Reconstructive Plastic Surgery and Burn Centre, the National Cardiothoracic Centre and the National Centre for Radiotherapy and Nuclear Medicine in particular also draw a sizeable number of their clientele from neighbouring countries such as Nigeria, Burkina Faso and Togo.

Plans are underway to venture into molecular testing. All these are part of the grand plan to offer a wider spectrum of specialist care to position Ghana as the hub of health tourism within the West Africa Sub region.

In September 2023, the hospital came under heavy national discourse when it was reported to have increased the price of dialysis. However, the hospital later apologised to Ghanaians for the disquiet caused as the alleged new fee had not been approved. On 29 September 2023, the government through the ministry of health summoned the management of the Hospital over the yet to be implemented increament of the cost of dialysis.

In April 2023, the Vice-President of Ghana, Dr Mahamudu Bawumia inaugurated a $100 million catheterization laboratory for the hospital. This was aimed at improving and supporting accurate imaging and sensing of diseases.

== Institutions ==
The hospital has a very large campus and has expanded to host a number of institutions. The list includes the following:

- University of Ghana Medical School
- University of Ghana Dental School
- University of Ghana School of Biomedical and Allied Health Sciences
- Nurses Training College
- Midwifery Training School
- Ghana Medical Association
- Ghana Association of Medical Laboratory Scientists
- School of Hygiene(Preventive medicine)
- School of Radiology
- school of Peri-operative and critical care nursing
- Ophthalmic Nursing school

== Korle-Bu Neuroscience Foundation ==
The Korle-Bu Neuroscience Foundation (KBNF) is a project in aid of Korle-Bu Teaching Hospital. It was founded by Marjorie Ratel, a nurse of neuroscience in Vancouver, British Columbia, Canada. The KBNF was involved in the foundation of the Korle-Bu Neuroscience Center.

== See also ==
- Komfo Anokye Teaching Hospital
- List of hospitals in Ghana
