= Kurankyi-Taylor =

Ghanaian judge and politician

Ernest Eggay Kwesi Kurankyi-Taylor

Member of Parliament for Kumasi South
- In office 1956–1959
- Monarch: Queen Elizabeth
- Governor General: Charles Arden-Clarke
- Prime Minister: Kwame Nkrumah
- Preceded by: Edward Asafu-Adjaye
- Constituency: Kumasi South

Personal details
- Born: 1922 Cape Coast
- Died: 1959 (aged 36–37) Manchester
- Party: Convention People's Party
- Other political affiliations: United Party
- Education: University of Cambridge
- Occupation: Politician
- Profession: Judge
- Known for: Pan-Africanism

Ernest Eggay Kwesi Kurankyi-Taylor (1922 in Cape Coast, Ghana - 1959 in Manchester) was a prominent Ghanaian judge and activist.

== Life ==
E. E. K. Kurankyi-Taylor was the son of James Eggay Taylor, a Cape Coast merchant who was an old boy of Mfantsipim School and an active member of the Aborigines' Rights Protection Society and the National Congress of British West Africa. Kurankyi-Taylor was educated at Mfantsipim, Fourah Bay College, University of Manchester and Cambridge University, where he earned a Ph.D.

During his time in the United Kingdom, he was active in the Pan-African movement, and was one of the delegates to the 1945 Manchester Pan-African Congress. He represented the Negro Welfare Centre in Liverpool, together with his brother Jimmy Taylor, who helped organize the 1945 Manchester Pan African Congress, and was also a member of the West African Students Union (WASU).

Upon Kurankyi-Taylor's return to Ghana, he taught at Mfantsipim and University College of Ghana. He was originally a member of Kwame Nkrumah’s Convention People’s Party (CPP) during the fight for independence from Britain. Kurankyi-Taylor later was expelled from CPP due to differences with Nkrumah and joined the National Liberation Movement (later United Party) led by Dr. Kofi Busia and Dr. J.B. Danquah. Kurankyi-Taylor was elected to Parliament from Ashanti (Kumasi South) in the 1956 Elections with the highest vote in the whole elections.

When he died unexpectedly in Manchester at the age of 37, Dr. J. B. Danquah paid him tribute: "Kurankyi-Taylor was a persuasive, eloquent and trenchant advocate who devoted himself not only to the cause of his party but also to the nation as a whole".

His wife, Dorothy Kurankyi-Taylor (née Dorothy Davies) published a selection of poems Reflected Thoughts, in 1959. It is not known whether Kurankyi-Taylor had a significant role in these works. The two met during his studies in Manchester.

== Personal life ==
Kurankyi-Taylor was the uncle of Kofi Dsane-Selby.
