= Aggrey-Orleans =

Aggrey-Orleans is a surname. Notable people with the surname include:

- Agnes Aggrey-Orleans née Bartels (fl. early 21st century), Ghanaian diplomat
- James Aggrey-Orleans (1937–2018), Ghanaian civil servant and diplomat
