= Ajoa Yeboah-Afari =

Ghanaian journalist and author

- Born: 13 March 1950
- Education: University of Media, Arts and Communication, University of Ghana, International Institute for Journalism
- Occupations: Writer, journalist
- Father: Boahene Yeboah-Afari
- Awards: Order of the Volta

Ajoa Victoria Yeboah-Afari (born 13 March 1950) is a Ghanaian journalist and author. She is a former editor of The Ghanaian Times and former president of the Ghana Journalists Association.

Ajoa Yeboah-Afari was born on 13 March 1950 in the Brong-Ahafo region of Ghana, the daughter of Ghanaian politician Boahene Yeboah-Afari. She was educated at Dormaa Senior High School and Labone Senior High School, then went on to graduate from the Ghana Institute of Journalism in 1970 and the University of Ghana in 1973. Later in life she attended the International Institute for Journalism in Berlin.

Her journalism career began with The Sunday Mirror under editor Eddie Agyeman, where she worked for over sixteen years. From 1970 to 1973 she had a weekly column called "Yaa Yaa's World," collected in the book The Best of Yaa Yaa. Following complaints that her column was unfair to men, The Mirror added another column, "Male Mutterings" by Koo Pia, which was actually the pseudonym of another female Mirror staffer. Under editor Nicholas Alando, she began another column in 1976 called "Thoughts of a Native Daughter", likewise collected as A Decade of Thoughts of a Native Daughter (1988).

She worked as a freelance reporter from 1984 to 1997, reporting for West Africa magazine, the British Broadcasting Corporation, and the Women’s Feature Service of India. She was elected president of the Ghana Journalists Association in 2003 and served as editor of The Ghanaian Times from 2004 to 2008.

== Awards and honors ==
Yeboah-Afari was named Journalist of the Year by the Ghana Journalists Association in 1972. Later in her career, the GJA named her as the first recipient of their John Kogblenu Award for Valour. The audience of BBC's Network Africa voted her African Columnist of the Year in 1985. In 2006, she was awarded the Companion of the Order of the Volta by the Republic of Ghana.

== Bibliography ==
- The Best of Yaa Yaa
- The Sound of Pestles and Other Stories. Accra: Afram Publications (1986)
- A Decade of Thoughts of a Native Daughter: a collection of most of the articles from the popular 'Mirror' column, 1976-1986. Legon: Adwinsa (1988)
- Conversations with my father : a biography of B. Yeboah-Afari, Ghana's first minister of agriculture & Brong-Ahafo's first regional commissioner. Tema: Digibooks (2017)
- New Currency. Sakumono:Smartline (2022)
