= Philomena Nyarko =

Ghanaian statistician

- Education: University of Southampton; University of Ghana
- Occupation: Statistician

Philomena Efua Nyarko is a Ghanaian statistician and academic, and the former Government Statistician for Ghana, chief executive of the Ghana Statistical Service (GSS).

== Education ==
Nyarko has a PhD in social statistics, awarded by the University of Southampton, United Kingdom. She also studied at the University of Ghana, and was awarded a graduate diploma in population studies.

== Career ==
Nyarko started working for the Ghana Statistical Service in 1987. During her time there, she worked on the Ghana Demographic and Health Survey 1995. She left the organisation in 1996 and worked at the Navrongo Health Research Centre, leading the Demographic Surveillance System. She taught at the University of Ghana from 2001 to 2010, focusing on technical demography, basic statistics, and advanced quantitative analysis. During her time there she also worked for the Population Council on reproductive health.

Nyarko was appointed acting Government Statistician in 2010. She was appointed to the post permanently in 2013. Her predecessor had been Grace Bediako. Nyarko remained in post until 2016.

As Government Statistician, she was responsible for the 2014 Ghana Demographic and Health Survey report. She also worked on the National Strategy for the Development of Statistics and the Strategic Plan for the Improvement of the Civil Registration and Vital Statistics System in Ghana. She set up collaboration between the GSS and Accra Technical University to give students access to statistical training.

On leaving the Ghana Statistical Service, Nyarko worked as a consultant and was on the Expert Group of the Regional Report of the African Gender and Development Index. She is also on the board of the African Digital Rights Hub, as vice-chair. She is on the board of the University for Development Studies. Nyarko is also working on the Second Phase of the Global Strategy to Improve Agricultural and Rural Statistics.

She has been listed by the Graphic as an example of women participating in governance in Ghana, and in the Junior Graphic as a successful female leader.

Nyarko has said that access to and take-up of contraception should be improved in Ghana, or there will be adverse effects for the country's development. She has also argued for an increase in the legal age of marriage in Ghana from 18 to 23, in order to decrease population growth and improve women's health.

With extensive teaching and research expertise, Dr. Philomena Efua Nyarko has offered technical guidance and strategic leadership to numerous public and private sector organizations.

== Personal life ==
Nyarko is married and lives in Kumasi. In 2021 she was reported missing.

== Publications ==
=== Statistical reports ===
- A Situation Analysis Study of Family Planning Service Delivery Points in Ghana (1994), with K. A. Twum-Baah, Pamela Wolf and Henry Odai, Accra: Ghana Statistical Service
- The Pattern of Poverty in Ghana, 1988-1992: A Study Based on the Ghana Living Standards Survey (1995), with Harold Coulombe, Andrew McKay, Moses Avooner-Williams et al., Accra: Ghana Statistical Service
- Ghana Statistical Yearbook (2010), Accra: Ghana Statistical Service
- 2010 Population and Housing Census: Summary of Final Results (2012), Accra: Ghana Statistical Service.
- (ed) Integrated Business Establishment Survey: National Employment Report (2015), Accra: Ghana Statistical Service.

=== Journal articles ===
- "The effect of community nurses and health volunteers on child mortality: The Navrongo Community Health and Family Planning Project", with Brian Pence, James F. Phillips and Cornelius Debpuur, Scandinavian Journal of Public Health, December 2007, Vol. 35 Issue 6, p599-608.
- "Is a woman's first pregnancy outcome related to her years of schooling? An assessment of women's adolescent pregnancy outcomes and subsequent educational attainment in Ghana", by Adriana Biney and Philomena Nyarko, Reproductive Health 10 March 2017, Vol. 14, p1-15.
- "Contemporary female migration in Ghana: Analyses of the 2000 and 2010 Censuses" (2018), with Samantha Lattof, Ernestina Coast and Tiziana Leone, Demographic Research 39: 1181–1226.
