= Freemasonry in Ghana =

- Established: 11 April 1810; 216 years ago
- Location: Accra, Ghana
- Region served: Ghana, West Africa
- Website: District Grand Lodge of Ghana; Grand Lodge of Ghana

The history of Freemasonry in Ghana can be traced to the early nineteenth century when the first Masonic lodge was consecrated in the country. The practice of Freemasonry was imported to the then Gold Coast and other Commonwealth realms by European residents in the nation during the British colonial era. Most of the lodges in Ghana are governed by the United Grand Lodge of England (UGLE) and Wales, Grand Lodge of Scotland and the Grand Lodge of Ireland. Similar to their sister organisations worldwide, Ghanaian masonic fraternities are nonsectarian, with proceedings of the societies being strictly apolitical and non–religious.

== History ==
Like other lodges in the six million–member global fraternity, Ghanaian Freemasons are expected to believe in the immortality of the soul and in a Creator or a Supreme Being, sometimes referred to as the Grand Architect of the Universe. Membership is open to all irrespective of ethnicity or social background. The oldest grand lodges were consecrated in England (1717), Ireland (1725), France (1728), the United States (1730) and Scotland (1736). Membership is either by invitation only or free–will depending on the geographic region.

The inspiration for freemasonry is connected to the ancient days of the biblical Solomonic Temple, 4000 years ago, through to the craft of stonemasonry in the Middle Ages. The craft of Freemasonry is found in the Holy Books (Bible, Torah, Vedas, Quran), the old charges or old manuscripts and old lodge charters dating to circa 1390, and in Masonic books. In Europe and Ottoman territories, each country formed its own Masonic Speculative Lodges and Grand Orient Lodges. There have been records of ancient lodges in Beirut, Damascus and Tripoli.

=== Principles ===
Members are taught the principles of fellowship and friendships with emphasis on education, personal integrity, personal responsibility, character, morality, ethics, philanthropy and social/charitable contributions. Historically, the core principles of Ghanaian Freemasonry included brotherly love, relief and truth. Masonic meetings forbid political discussions. While its laws are made public, the internal affairs of Ghanaian Freemasonry are considered private.

=== District Grand Lodge of Ghana ===
The records of the first lodges on the Gold Coast indicate that Torridzonian Lodge No. 621 was consecrated on 11 April 1810 at the Cape Coast Castle. In 1833, another lodge, Cape Coast Lodge No. 599 was constituted. By 1863, both lodges had become defunct. Specifically, Torridzonian Lodge was formally decommissioned on 4 June, 1862. In 1859, the United Grand Lodge of England constituted the Gold Coast Lodge, No. 1075 English Constitution, (later numbered 773) which has been active since that period. At the turn of the nineteenth century and the first decade of the twentieth century, several lodges were consecrated under the English Constitution of the UGLE:

- Victoria Lodge No. 2393 on 2 December 1891 in Accra
- Accra Lodge No. 3063 on 2 March 1905, in Accra
- Sekondi Lodge No. 3238 on 19 March 1908, in Sekondi
- Taquah Lodge No. 3356 on 27 May 1909, in Tarkwa
- Ashanti Lodge No. 3717 on 20 March 1914 based in Kumasi
- St. George’s Lodge No. 3851 on 25 September 1918 based in Sekondi
- McCarthy Lodge No. 4132 on 29 January 1921 also based in Kumasi

The Grand Lodge of Scotland entered the fray in 1921 when it issued a charter to establish Lodge Progressive No. 1261 on 30 November 1921, in Cape Coast. Subsequently, a series of lodges were consecrated under the Scottish constitution:

- Lodge St. Andrew No. 1299 on 12 January 1924 in Accra
- Lodge Morality No. 1362 on 29 December 1929 in Kumasi
- Lodge Unity No. 1466 on 29 December 1951 in Accra
- Lodge Fidelity No. 1468 on 26 January 1952 in Takoradi
- Lodge Kumasi No. 1472 on 1 November 1952 in Kumasi
- Lodge Charity No. 1473 on 3 January 1953 in Accra
- Lodge Achimota No. 1522 on 29 December 1956 in Accra

As more lodges were erected, a petition by the ten Lodges under the United Grand Lodge of England for a District Grand Lodge was granted. The District Grand Lodge of the Gold Coast under the English Constitution was inaugurated in Accra on 9 May 1931. In January 1953 the seven Gold Coast Lodges under the Grand Lodge of Scotland petitioned for a District Grand Lodge of the Gold Coast under the Scottish Constitution which was inaugurated on 17 January 1953. When Ghana attained its independence from the United Kingdom in 1957, the St. Patrick Lodge No. 793, was consecrated on 16 March 1957 and was the sole Lodge in Ghana Warrant granted by the Grand Lodge of Ireland for 14 years. Thus, all three of the “Home Grand Lodges" had representation in Ghana. Beginning in 1971, six new Lodges were consecrated under Warrant granted by the Grand Lodge of Ireland:

- Abuakwa Lodge No. 840 on 9 January 1971 in Akwatia
- Saltpond Lodge No. 841 on 28 August 1971 in Saltpond
- Ahanta Lodge No. 843 on 20 May 1972 in Sekondi
- Asante Kotoko Lodge No. 844 on 1 July 1972 in Kumasi
- Adanisman Lodge No. 849 on 4 April 1973 in Obuasi
- Sekyere Lodge No. 850 on 28 April 1973 in Asante Mampong

The seven Lodges, operating under the Irish constitution petitioned and received approval for a Provincial Grand Lodge of Ghana, formed on 1 September 1973. In early 1994, a lecture titled “Let us Have a United Grand Lodge of Ghana” was presented at the meeting of Unicorn Lodge No. 8840, English Constitution with proposals made to achieve the unification objective. The Ghanaian quantity surveyor, politician and a Freemason, Harry Sawyerr delivered a speech at the Diamond Jubilee Celebration of Lodge St. Andrew No. 1299 Scottish Constitution, outlining how recognition for the United Grand Lodge of Ghana could be achieved.

On 9 June 2003, at an Open Forum held under the aegis of the Concordia Lodge No. 7199, English Constitution, with representatives from all the three Masonic Constitutions in Ghana, the idea of the United Grand Lodge of Ghana was discussed at length. In 2004, the Provincial Grand Master of Ghana Irish Constitution, Nana Herman Mould and the District Grand Master Scottish Constitution, Charles William Stanley–Pierre and District Grand Master of Ghana English Constitution, Kow Abaka Quansah conferred on establishing the Grand Lodge of Ghana. The then Provincial Grand Master–Designate of the Irish Constitution, John Atta–Quayson, attended the meeting. Other Masons who advocated for a joint lodge were Fredua, Mensah, then Provincial Grand Master of the Irish Constitution, D. S. Quarcoopome, then District Grand Master Scottish Constitution and later still Nana Herman A. Mould as Provincial Grand Master, Irish Constitution. The District Grand Lodge of Ghana, English Constitution was not in favour of a Grand Lodge of Ghana and therefore the unified entity was limited to the Scottish District and the Irish Province. Thus none of 57 English Constitution Lodge joined the Grand Lodge of Ghana.

=== Grand Lodge of Ghana ===
The Provincial Grand Master, Irish Constitution and District Grand Master, Scottish Constitution, formed a Joint–Committee for rolling out the steps for establishing the Grand Lodge of Ghana. Within three years, the committee produced a draft Constitution and Laws for the Grand Lodge of Ghana, Ritual for Opening and Closing Grand Lodge, Regalia and paraphernalia for Grand Lodge, Provincial Grand Lodges and Subordinate Lodges, as well as miscellaneous Documents, including Warrants, Letters of Commission, Forms and Books of administration. Fundraising activities for the formation of the Grand Lodge were also developed and periodic progress reports issued to the aspiring members. The Joint–Committee transformed into a Steering Committee for the formation of the lodge. For further deliberations, a series of assemblies were held at the:

- Freemasons’ Hall, Adjabeng, Accra on 7 May 2008
- Freemasons’ Hall, Ahodwo, Kumasi on 14 May 2008
- Freemasons’ Hall, Windy Ridge, Takoradi on 28 May 2008
- Freemasons’ Hall, Aboom Wells Road, Cape Coast on 28 May 2008

A consultative assembly of accredited lodge members was convened to review and approve the draft constitution and laws on Saturday 7 June 2008. On Saturday 12 July 2008, the Electoral College assembled to elect the first Grand Master of the Grand Lodge of Ghana. Approximately 49 subordinate Lodges, made up of 21 Irish Lodges and 28 Scottish constitute the foundation lodges under novel warrants granted by the Grand Lodge of Ghana with new numbering based on the date of Consecration/Constitution and grouped into three Provincial Grand Lodges:

- Provincial Grand Lodge, South East, located in Accra with 20 Lodges
- Provincial Grand Lodge, South West, located in Cape Coast with 17 Lodges
- Provincial Grand Lodge, North, located in Kumasi with 12 Lodges

The Grand Lodge of Ghana was formally founded on 24 January 2009 as a "Sovereign Masonic Body" under the auspices of the Grand Lodge of Ireland, led by the Grand Master George Dunlop, and Grand Master Mason of Scotland, Charles Iain Robert Wolridge Gordon of Esselmont. The United Grand Lodge of England (UGLE) was the first Grand Lodge to pass a resolution to recognise the newly–constituted Grand Lodge of Ghana. Charles William Stanley–Pierre was installed the first Grand Master. In 2013, he was succeeded by Otwasuom Osae Nyampong VI. The motto of the Grand Lodge of Ghana is “That All Shall Be One.”

== Chapters ==
The following are the chapters of Masonic chapters in Ghana:

Chapter	Location
Gold Coast Chapter No. 773	Cape Coast
Victoria Chapter No. 2392	Accra
Secondi Chapter No. 3238	Sekondi
Taquah Chapter No. 3356	Tarkwa
Ashanti Chapter No. 3717	Kumasi.
St. George’s Chapter No. 3851	Sekondi–Takoradi
McCarthy Chapter No. 4132	Kumasi
Accra Chapter No. 3063	Accra
Harmonic Chapter No. 4190	Accra
Three Pillars Chapter No. 4867	Accra
Amity Chapter No. 7140	Accra
Concordia Chapter No. 7199	Accra
Mfantsiman Chapter No. 7260	Cape Coast
Osu Chapter No. 7627	Accra
Excelsior Chapter No. 7670	Kumasi
Winneba Chapter No. 7708	Winniba
Adisadel Chapter No. 7791	Cape Coast
University of Technology Chapter No. 7792 SC	Kumasi
Tamale Chapter No. 7823	Tamale
Legon Chapter No. 8266	Achimota
Asanteman Chapter No. 8351	Kumasi
Chapter Of Perfection No. 8559	Accra
Public Service Chapter No. 8587	Accra
Togo Chapter No. 8605	Lome, Togo
Volta Chapter No. 8652	Ho
Okwawuman Chapter No. 8754	Abetifi
Meridian Chapter of Installed 1st Principals No. 9386	Accra

== Lodges ==
Lodges established in different cities in Ghana include:

Lodge	Location
Gold Coast Lodge No. 773	Cape Coast
Victoria Lodge No. 2392	Accra
Accra Lodge No. 3063	Accra
Sekondi Lodge No. 3238	Sekondi–Takoradi
Taquah Lodge No. 3356	Tarkwa
Ashanti Lodge No. 3717	Kumasi
St. George’s Lodge No. 3851	Sekondi–Takoradi
McCarthy Lodge No. 4132	Kumasi
Harmonic Lodge No. 4190	Accra
Three Pillars Lodge No. 4867	Accra
Travellers Lodge No. 6758	Accra
Amity Lodge No. 7140	Accra
Wassaw Lodge No. 7141	Tarkwa
Mfantsipim Lodge No. 7260	Cape Coast
Coronation Lodge No. 7309	Sekondi–Takoradi
Gold Coast Jubilee Masters Lodge No. 7457	Accra
Keta Lodge No. 7467	Keta
Osu Lodge No. 7627	Accra
Exelsior Lodge No. 7670	Kumasi
Tema Lodge No. 7718	Tema
Adisadel Lodge No. 7791	Cape Coast
University of Technology Lodge No. 7792	Kumasi
Tamale Lodge No. 7823	Tamale
Brong Ahafo Lodge No. 7862	Sunyani
Mfantsiman Lodge No. 7863	Cape Coast
Concordia Lodge No. 7199	Accra
Winneba Lodge No. 7708	Winneba
Sir Charles Tachie–Menson Lodge No. 8058	Accra
Legon Lodge No. 8266	Achimota
Odadee Lodge No. 10031	Accra

== Grand Masters ==
=== District Grand Lodge of Ghana ===
District Grand Master	Tenure of office
D. J. Oman	1931–1934
Major G. T. Kingsford	1935–1945
Major Charles Owen Butler	1947–1950
Sir Charles W. Tachie-Menson, KBE	1950–1962
Dr. Stanley Walker Coope	1963–1968
Dr. Ebenezer A. Sackey, OBE	1969–1988
Dr. J. V. L. Philips	1988–1998
E. A. B. Mayne	1998–2002
B. K. Otoo	2002–2004
Kow Abaka Quansah	2004–2015
Isaac Owulaku Hood	2016–

=== Grand Lodge of Ghana ===
Grand Master	Tenure of office
Charles William Stanley-Pierre	2009–2013
Otwasuom Osae Nyampong VI, Kamenahene of the Akwamu	2013–2017
Naval Captain (rtd.) Kwadjo Adunkwa Butah	2017–2021
Nana Osei Atwene Bonsu	2021–2025
Dr. Nortey Kwashie Omaboe (Nana Awuku Sakyi, Akyempemhene of Amanokrom; Mpuntuhene of Akuapem)	2025–

== Sister organisations in Anglophone West Africa ==
=== Liberia ===
Freemasonry in Liberia started in 1867 when the craft was brought to the country by Americo–Liberian settlers, descendants of freed slaves in the United States. The Grand Lodge of Liberia is based in Monrovia, its traditions are steeped in the Prince Hall Freemasonry, the United States Masonic Lodge, predominantly populated by African-American men. The Grand Lodge of Liberia is the first independent, self–initiated Masonic lodge in Africa. With 1750 members, 14 out of 19 subordinate lodges were re–activated in 1988 after the Liberian Civil War. The fourth edition of the 1992 Prince Hall Masonic Directory lists 500 members from the 19 lodges before the conflict. The fifth edition of the directory (1997) listed 13 lodges and there was no entry for the sixth edition (2003). In 1999, the United Grand Lodge of England recognised the Grand Lodge of Liberia. In 2000, the Government of Liberia Gazette noted the death of the Deputy Grand Master of Liberia.

=== Nigeria ===
With 51 lodges, the Grand Lodge of Nigeria is based in Calabar near Cross River and on the coast of southeastern Nigeria. The Masonic society was founded on 3 November 2012 by the Grand Master Mason of Scotland. The pioneer grand master of the Nigerian Grand Lodge was consecrated by the grand master of Ireland. About 20 lodges of the Irish Provincial Grand Lodge and 31 of the 45 lodges of the Scottish District Grand Lodge came together to form the unified grand lodge. Like its Ghanaian counterpart, the District Grand Lodge of Nigeria, English Constitution, declined to join the new partnership. As such, none of 33 English Constitution lodges became members of the Grand Lodge of Nigeria and are still under the UGLE. The remaining 14 lodges under the Scottish tradition are still members of the District Grand Lodge, Scottish Constitution.

== Notable people ==
Prominent Ghanaian Masons include:

=== Heads of State ===
- Kwame Nkrumah, politician, political theorist and revolutionary, Prime Minister, 1952 - 1960; President of Ghana, 1960 - 1966; Prince Hall Mason, initiated while studying in the United States
- Joseph Arthur Ankrah, military officer and Head of State of Ghana, 1966 –1969
- Akwasi Afrifa, military officer, farmer and Head of State of Ghana, 1969 –1970
- John Kufuor, President of Ghana, 2001–2009; senior grand warden, United Grand Lodge of England

=== Diplomats ===
- James Aggrey-Orleans, diplomat and civil servant, High Commissioner of Ghana to the United Kingdom, 1997 – 2001
- Edward Asafu-Adjaye, lawyer, diplomat and politician, first high commissioner of Ghana to the United Kingdom, 1957 – 1962
- K. B. Asante, diplomat, educator and civil servant
- Kofi Dsane-Selby, physician and diplomat, Ambassador of Ghana to France, 1970 – 1972
- Francis Lodowic Bartels, diplomat and educator, Ambassador of Ghana to West Germany, 1970 – 1972
- William George Mensah Brandful, diplomat

=== Health services ===
- Charles Odamtten Easmon, first Ghanaian surgeon specialist and the first dean, University of Ghana Medical School, deputy district grandmaster, Masonic District of Ghana
- Ernest James Hayford, Gold Coast physician and lawyer

=== Legislature ===
- Augustus Molade Akiwumi, lawyer, judge and second Speaker of the Parliament of Ghana, 1958 – 1960
- Jacob Hackenburg Griffiths-Randolph, judge and Speaker of the Parliament of Ghana in the Third Republic, 1979 –1981
- Nii Amaa Ollenu, jurist, judge and Speaker of the Parliament of Ghana in the Second Republic, 1969 – 1972
- Emmanuel Charles Quist, barrister, judge and the first African Speaker of the Legislative Council and first Speaker of the Parliament of Ghana, 1949 –1957
- Ebenezer Sekyi-Hughes, lawyer and Speaker of the Parliament of Ghana, 2005 –2009

=== Judiciary ===
- Isaac Kobina Abban, Chief Justice of Ghana, 1995 – 2001
- Vincent Cyril Richard Arthur Charles Crabbe, jurist and Justice of the Supreme Court of Ghana
- Kobina Arku Korsah, first Chief Justice of Ghana, 1957 –1963
- Edward Kwame Wiredu, Chief Justice of Ghana, 2001 – 2003

=== Politics ===
- Alexander Kwamina Afenyo-Markin, lawyer and politician
- Ebenezer Ako-Adjei, politician and member of the 'Big Six'
- Christopher Ameyaw-Akumfi, academic and politician
- J B Danquah, lawyer, politician, scholar and a member of the 'Big Six'
- Albert Kan Dapaah, politician and chartered accountant, Assistant Grand Master, Grand Lodge of Ghana
- John Henry Martey Newman, lawyer, Chief of Staff under the presidency of John Atta Mills
- Emmanuel Obetsebi-Lamptey, lawyer, politician and a member of the 'Big Six'
- Victor Owusu, lawyer and politician, former Attorney General and Minister of Justice, Leader of the Opposition in the Third Republic, 1979–1981
- Harry Sawyerr, politician and quantity surveyor
- John van der Puije, Gold Coast merchant, newspaper publisher, traditional ruler and politician
- Henry van Hien, Gold Coast merchant and politician

=== Traditional rulers or monarchs ===
- Oyeeman Wereko Ampem II, Gyaasehene of Akuapem and Amanokromhene, 1975 – 2005
- Ofori Atta I, Okyenhene or Omanhene of Akyem Abuakwa, 1912 – 1943
- Daasebre Oti Boateng, Omanhene of New Juaben, 1992 – 2021
- Azzu Mate Kole II, Konor of the Manya Krobo Traditional Area, 1939 – 1990
- Nana Sir Agyeman Prempeh II, Asantehene, 1931 – 1970
- Otumfuo Osei Tutu II, Asantehene, 1999 – present, Grand Patron, Grand Lodge of Ghana; Sword Bearer, United Grand Lodge of England; Grand Patron, Grand Lodge of Liberia

=== Urban planning and architecture ===
- Theodore S. Clerk, urban planner and first Ghanaian professionally certified architect
