= Governor Elias =

Governor Elias may refer to:

- Burchard Joan Elias (1799–1871), Governor-General of the Dutch West Indies from 1842 to 1845
- Henri Alexander Elias (1829–1903), Governor of the Dutch Gold Coast from 1864 to 1865
