= Intajour =

The International Academy of Journalism (Intajour) was a training institute for journalists from countries with limited press freedom and freedom of expression. The academy is based in Hamburg, Germany. Intajour is a limited liability company owned by Bertelsmann SE & Co. KGaA.

== History ==
Intajour was created to mark the 175th anniversary of Bertelsmann in 2010. The patron of the academy's founding act was European Commission President José Manuel Barroso, who declared in his opening speech: "High-quality journalism is a cornerstone of democracy."

The idea behind the academy: Intajour regards the digitization of the media as an opportunity for press freedom and freedom of expression worldwide. The so-called New Media make it possible to directly connect to journalists all over the world and support them in their work. Intajour's “Journalism in the Digital World” training program aims to prepare journalists from countries with limited press freedom for the digital future – and thereby contribute to safeguarding the future of press freedom and freedom of expression.

Werner Eggert was appointed as the academy's Founding Director. The academy started operations on January 1, 2011. The application process for the first ten-month “Journalism in the Digital World” training program opened in May 2011. The first 12 Intajour fellows arrived in Hamburg, Germany in September 2011. They successfully completed the program in June 2012.

In May 2014, three years after its founding, it was announced that Bertelsmann will close the academy. The company did not comment on the reasons.

== Training Program ==
Intajour offers a ten-month training program under the heading “Journalism in the Digital World” which runs for ten months. It includes attendance phases in Hamburg, Cologne and Berlin as well as e-learning phases. The academy uses the concept of hybrid learning, which combines the advantages of attendance phases and e-learning. The emphasis of the training program is on digital, multimedia journalism. Intajour regularly invites guest speakers from all over the world. They either join the Intajour fellows for talks during the attendance phases or for a webinar during the e-learning phases. The Intajour fellows receive grants that cover all costs for the attendance phases.

== Application Process ==
The program opens for applications each spring in March/April. The start of the application process is announced on the Intajour-Website and on its Facebook page. The program is targeted at experienced journalists with an interest in digital journalism who come from countries with limited press freedom and freedom of expression. The previous Intajour fellowscome from Armenia, Azerbaijan, Bangladesh, China, Ecuador, Egypt, Ghana, Honduras, Liberia, Moldova, Nepal, Nicaragua, Pakistan, Serbia, Sudan, Syria, Thailand, Ukraine, Zambia and Zimbabwe. Each year, 12 new Intajour fellows are selected to participate in the program.

== Journalistic Advisory Council and Board of Trustees ==
Intajour Director Werner Eggert is supported in his work by two bodies, the Journalistic Advisory Council and the board of trustees.

The Journalistic Advisory Council advises Intajour's Director on the development of the curricula and the selection of the Intajour fellows. The Journalistic Advisory Council is composed of journalists with longstanding experience in the profession. It currently consists of the following members: Peter Kloeppel (RTL Television), Georg Mascolo (journalist), Thomas Osterkorn (STERN), Leonhard Ottinger (RTL School of Journalism for TV and Multimedia), Karin Schlautmann (Bertelsmann SE & Co. KGaA) and Andreas Wolfers (Henri-Nannen School of Journalism).

The members of the Board of Trustees represent Bertelsmann's divisions. Its task is to advise Intajour on its budget and the academy's basic philosophy. The Board of Trustees currently has the following members: Klaus Eck (Random House), Oliver Fahlbusch (RTL Group), Hans Mahr (RTL Group), Stefan Postler (Arvato), Stephan Schäfer (Gruner + Jahr) and Karin Schlautmann (Bertelsmann SE & Co. KGaA).
