= Jane Menken =

American sociologist and demographer

- Born: Jane Ava Golubitsky; 1939 (age 86–87)
- Education: University of Pennsylvania (BA); Harvard University (MS, PhD)
- Occupations: Professor; statistician; researcher
- Notable work: Mathematical Models of Conception and Birth (1973); Natural Fertility (1979), Teenage Sexuality, Pregnancy, and Childbearing (1981); World Population and U.S. Policy: The Choices Ahead (1986); Aging in Sub-Saharan Africa (2006)

Jane Ava Menken (née Golubitsky; born 1939) is an American sociologist and demographer known for her work in sociology in public and international affairs, population studies, social statistics.

Menken has published a co-authored book Mathematical Models of Conception and Birth (1973), and is co-editor of Natural Fertility (1979), Teenage Sexuality, Pregnancy, and Childbearing (1981), World Population and U.S. Policy: The Choices Ahead (1986), and Aging in Sub-Saharan Africa (2006). In addition, Menken was a founding member of the editorial board of two academic journals in the demography discipline: Demographic Research and Southern African Journal of Demography.

== Education and career ==
After completing her undergraduate work at the University of Pennsylvania in 1960, Menken continued on to complete a master's degree in Biostatistics from Harvard University's School of Public Health in 1962 before taking a position as a mathematical statistician at the National Institute of Mental Health from 1964 to 1966. Menken then took a position as a research associate in biostatistics at Columbia University's School of Public Health and Administrative Medicine (1966–1969) until moving to Princeton in 1969, where she held a research position in its Office of Population Research, and then Research Demographer while she completed her Ph.D. in Sociology and Demography in 1975, and began as Assistant to the associate director from 1978 to 1987.

In 1977, Menken became associate professor of sociology at Princeton, and then full Professor from 1980 to 1987 before moving to the University of Pennsylvania in 1987 and later, the University of Colorado, Boulder in 1997, where she has been part of the Institute of Behavioral Science since 2001 and Distinguished Professor since 2002.

== Recognition ==
In 1977 she was elected as a Fellow of the American Statistical Association. In 1985 she was elected president of the Population Association of America. In 1989 she was elected member of the National Academy of Arts and Sciences, being then elected to the first class of National Associates of the National Academies of Science in 2001. In 2009 she was IUSSP Laureate of the International Union for the Scientific Study of Population.
