= Windy Ridge =

Windy Ridge may refer to:

== Australia ==
- Windy Ridge, the name of a homestead in Western Australia

== Ghana ==
- Windy Ridge, Takoradi

== New Zealand ==
- Windy Ridge, New Zealand, a suburb of North Shore

== United States ==
- Windy Ridge, a school in the Orange County Public School System of Orange County, Florida, U.S.A.
- Windy Ridge, a housing development seven miles northwest of Charlotte, North Carolina, U.S.A.
- Windy Ridge (Mount St. Helens), a part of the Mount St. Helens National Volcanic Monument

== Other uses ==
- Windyridge, a 1912 novel by Willie Riley
