= Demographic research =

Demographic research may refer to

- Demography, a field of study
- Demographic Research (journal)
