= Carel van Hien =

Dutch colonial administrator

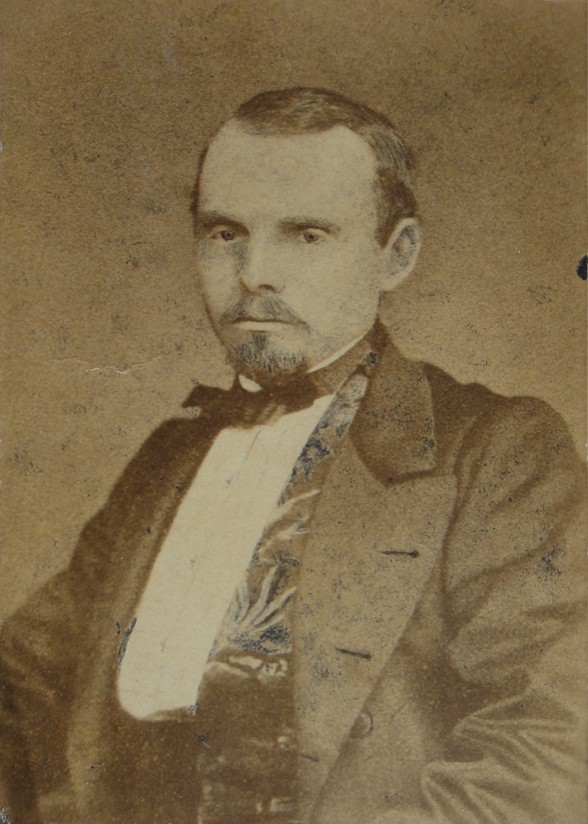

Governor of the Dutch Gold Coast
- ad interim
- In office 12 March 1864 – 13 June 1864
- Monarch: William III of the Netherlands
- Preceded by: Henri Alexander Elias
- Succeeded by: Hendrik Doyer

Personal details
- Born: 20 September 1833 Boxmeer, Netherlands
- Died: 30 June 1864 (aged 30) on board steamship MacGregor Laird, off Santa Cruz de Tenerife
- Spouse(s): Elizabeth Essuman; Marie Anne Varlet

Carel Hendrik David van Hien (born 20 September 1833 – 30 June 1864) was a Dutch colonial administrator, who made a career in the administration on the Dutch Gold Coast and who became interim governor during the European leave of governor Henri Alexander Elias on 12 March 1864. Van Hien only shortly served as interim governor, as he fell ill in June 1864 and left on sick leave to Europe on 14 June 1864. Van Hien did not survive his repatriation and died on board the steamship MacGregor Laird off Santa Cruz de Tenerife.

== Personal life ==
Carel van Hien fathered at least three children on the Gold Coast during his service there. With Elizabeth Essuman, sister of Willem Essuman Pietersen, he begot Henry van Hien, who later became a nationalist leader on the Gold Coast. With Marie Anne Varlet he fathered Carel Hendrik Albertus van Hien (1859–1893), who later went back to the Netherlands, and Lodewijk Willem van Hien, who died in infancy.
