= Francis Lodowic Bartels =

Ghanaian diplomat

Ambassador of Ghana to West Germany
- In office 1 May 1970 – January 1972
- Preceded by: George Eric Kwabla Doe
- Succeeded by: Eric Kwamina Otoo

Personal details
- Born: 13 March 1910 Cape Coast, Gold Coast
- Died: 20 March 2010 (aged 100) Paris, France
- Relations: James Aggrey-Orleans (son-in-law)
- Children: Agnes Aggrey-Orleans (daughter); Carlien Bartels Melamu (daughter); Wilhelmina Cummings-Palmer (daughter); Francis Bartels (Son); Margaret-Reid Bartels Laryea (daughter)

Francis Lodowic Bartels (13 March 1910 – 20 March 2010) was a Ghanaian diplomat and educationalist, who served as Ghana's ambassador to West Germany between 1970 and 1972.

== Biography ==
Francis Bartels was born in Cape Coast to the Rev. Charles Henry Bartels (1885–1938), a Methodist minister, and Agnes Mensah (1887–1940). He stems from a prominent Gold Coast Euro-African family from Elmina. Carel Hendrik Bartels was his great-great-grandfather. One of his daughters is the Ghanaian diplomat, Agnes Aggrey-Orleans.

Bartels attended the Mfantsipim School between 1925 and 1928 and the Wesley College of Education, Kumasi between 1929 and 1931. A King Edward VII Scholarship allowed him to continue his studies at King's College London, where he graduated in 1935 with a Bachelor of Arts. He then returned to the Gold Coast to teach at the Mfantsipim School. Between 1946 and 1947, Bartels studied teaching at the University College London and subsequently taught at the Selly Oak Colleges in Birmingham. After he received a Master of Arts there, Bartels again returned to the Gold Coast, to become the first Euro-African President of the Mfantsipim School. From 1949-1961 he was the first black African headmaster of Mfantsipim School. He co-founded the Conference of Heads of Assisted Secondary Schools (CHASS) in the 1950s. CHASS is a platform for principals and heads of secondary schools in Ghana to discuss and exchange ideas and experiences regarding the administration of secondary education at the time.

In 1989 he was awarded an honorary doctorate in law (LL.D.) from the University of Ghana. He was a founding member of the Mfantsipim Lodge of the District Grand Lodge of Ghana.

He died in Paris a week after his 100th birthday.

== Publications ==
- Mfantse nkasafua dwumadzi; a Fante grammar of function (1946)
- The Beginning of Africanisation: the dawn of the missionary motive in Gold Coast education, Rev. Thomas Thompson, 1751–1951 (1951)
- Philip Quaque, 1741–1816 (1955)
- Jacobus Eliza Johannes Capitein, 1717–47 (1959)
- The roots of Ghana Methodism (1965)
- Akan indigenous education (1975)
- Trends in Innovation: Basic Education in Africa (1981)
- The Persistence of Paradox: Memoirs of F. L. Bartels (2003)
- Journey out of the African maze: indigenous and higher education in tandem (2007)
