= Jacob Wilson Sey =

Gold Coast artisan, farmer and philanthropist (1832–1902)

Jacob Kwaw Wilson Sey
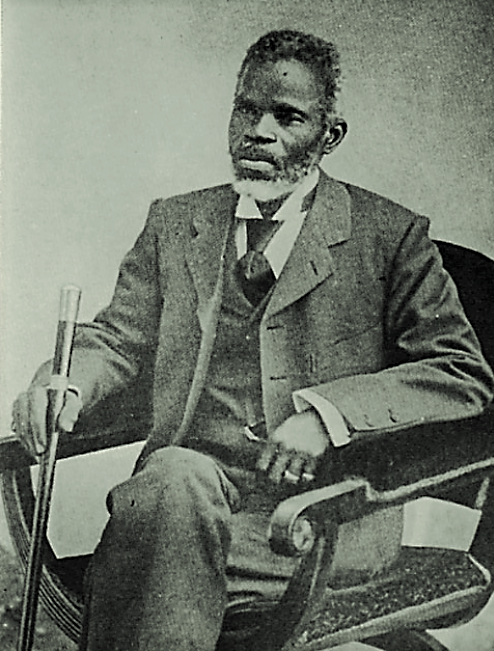
- Born: 10 March 1832; Biriwa, Gold Coast
- Died: 22 May 1902 (aged 70); Cape Coast, Gold Coast
- Other name: Kwaa Aboan’nyi or Kwaa Bonyi
- Occupations: Artisan; Farmer; Philanthropist
- Known for: First recorded indigenous multi-millionaire on the Gold Coast; Co-founder, architect and financier of the Aboringines' Rights Protection Society (ARPS)
- Spouse: Agnes Charlotte Amba Kosimah Morgue

Jacob Kwaw Wilson Sey (10 March 1832 – 22 May 1902), also known as Kwaa Bonyi, was a colonial era Fante artisan, farmer, philanthropist, nationalist and the first recorded indigenous multi-millionaire on the Gold Coast (present-day Ghana). He played a major role in the Aborigines' Rights Protection Society (ARPS), founded to oppose the 1896 Crown Lands Bill and the 1897 Lands Bill that threatened the traditional land tenure system and stipulated that all unused lands be controlled by the British colonial government. The society was the 19th-century precursor that laid the foundation for the mid-20th-century "ideological warfare" pushed by the Gold Coast intelligentsia and the independence movement. Some academic scholars regard Sey as the "first real architect and financier towards Ghana's independence" and the ARPS as "the first attempt to institutionalize nationalist sentiment in the then Gold Coast."

== Early life ==
Jacob Wilson Sey was born on 10 March 1832 in a fishing village, Biriwa, close to Cape Coast, which was the colonial capital of the Gold Coast until 1877. A Fante native, Sey was a member of the Akona Ebiradze family of Anomabu-Biriwa-Moree and Cape Coast. He had a humble background and was a neglected child. His father, Paapa Saah, worked as a carpenter while his mother, Maame Abadua, was a farmer. Sey had two brothers, Joseph Ewusi and Kwabena Wilson-Sey. As a child, Wilson-Sey, noted for his sense of humour, was nicknamed "Kwaa Aboan'nyi", later shortened to "Kwaa Bonyi", the de facto village jester. From her meagre resources, Sey's mother gave him £7, with which he bought a piece of land for farming at Asafura village on the outskirts of Biriwa. Due to extreme poverty, his illiterate parents were unable to afford formal education, forcing Sey to join his father's carpentry workshop as an apprentice. To supplement his income, Jacob Sey went into palm wine tapping and palm oil manufacturing trade. Later, Jacob Sey also mastered joinery to become a coffin vendor. Sey's coffin business flourished due to his acclaimed wit.

== Acquisition of wealth ==
According to historical narratives, Sey acquired his wealth in a "manner that looked like a fairy tale, an African ‘Aladdin Cave tale’ and became one of the very, very few multi-millionaires in the whole of Africa."

In search of high-quality palm fruits, Sey went to a farm between Asafura and Egyirfa, one moonlit night at a quarter to one in the morning when the entire village had retired to bed. A staunch Methodist, he usually sang hymns on the way to his farm but he only murmured a short prayer this time around. At the farm, he started climbing a palm tree atop a hill when he saw a snake coiled around the tree trunk and advancing in his direction, whereupon Sey panicked and slipped, losing consciousness on impact with the ground. According to popular history, while he was in a comatose state, the voice of an apparition commanded him "to wake up and go in peace and therefore show love and kindness to the needy." When he awoke, he chanced upon a shiny item in the dark and approached it apprehensively, only to discover a gold nugget, and nearby were several pots of gold dust as well.

Elated, he cordoned the place and smuggled the treasure to his house before sunrise. It is estimated that the large quantity of gold is equivalent to £200 billion today. His newfound wealth made Sey a celebrity literally overnight. His sartorial taste changed from wearing a traditional African cloth to Victorian tail coats, silk shirts, trousers and a fedora. His people now addressed him as Jacob Wilson-Sey, Esq.

== Role in the Aborigines' Rights Protection Society ==
Sey co-founded and then became the first president of Aborigines' Rights Protection Society (ARPS), formed to campaign and voice local opposition to the 1897 Lands Bill being considered by the British colonial government. Prominent members of the group were the upper-class, Western-educated, wealthy elites who were comfortable with their indigenous roots, such as J. W. de Graft-Johnson, J. P. Brown, J. E. Casely Hayford, and John Mensah Sarbah. On behalf of chiefs and people of the country, he led a delegation of the Society, consisting of Thomas Freeman together with Cape Coast merchants Edward Jones and George Hughes, to petition Queen Victoria to abrogate the Bill. Sey fully funded the entire cost of the trip to London, including the hiring of a ship, the Alba. The legislation was already listed in the Government's Gazette extra-ordinary No. 8, dated 10 March 1897. The petition was necessitated by the fact that only two native members of the Gold Coast Legislative Council were unable to block the passage of the Bill due to lack of legislative powers and numerical advantage. Fifteen paramount chiefs and traditional regents on the Gold Coast were signatories to the petition: Amonoo IV, King of Anomabu; Otu IV, King of Abura; Kwame Essandoh IV, King of Nkusukum; Badu Bonso, King of Ahanta; Hima Dekyi, King Atta, King of Behin – Western Appolonia; Wiraku Atobura, King of Western Wassaw; Kwesi Ble, King of Atoabu, Eastern Appolonia; Nkwantabisa, King of Denkyira; Akyin II, King of Ekumfi; Kobina Kondua, King of Elmina; Kobina Hamah, King of Adjumaku and more than 64 Chiefs from the Western and Central provinces. This petition was received by the then Secretary of State for the Colonies, Joseph Chamberlin at 10 Downing Street.

The ARPS had legal aid from a Sierra Leonean solicitor, Edward F. Hunt, with assistance from a team of barristers from a London-based law firm, Messrs. Ashurst, Crips Co., and a certain Mr. Corrie. The ARPS deputation was successful in its appeal and returned to West Africa with a letter signed by Queen Victoria, effectively repealing the Lands Bill. The team also returned with a gift of the Queen's bust that was later inaugurated at Cape Coast’s Victoria Park by Princess Anne, a granddaughter of Queen Victoria during an official visit in 1925. Sey encouraged the chiefs who had signed the petition to donate land for the establishment of other "Victoria Parks" in other Gold Coast cities and towns, including Saltpond, Winneba, Elmina, Axim, Accra, Koforidua and Kyebi.

== Philanthropy ==
After the successful mission, Jacob Wilson Sey dedicated the rest of his life to philanthropy to help improve the lives of his compatriots in Cape Coast and the Central Province. With the help of colonial civil servant and fellow ARPS member, John Mensah Sarbah, Sey lobbied and negotiated with the colonial administration for a railway project at Cape Coast to enhance trade and commerce Sarbah was on good terms with several successive Governors: White, Griffith, Hodgson and Maxwell. The government imposed certain conditions: "If the native farmers from Cape Coast and the Central Province could produce an annual cocoa output of two tonnes within a certain time frame, the project will be initiated." Sey and Sarbah injected personal cash to stimulate the growth of cocoa and palm oil farming but were ultimately unsuccessful in meeting the set conditions which would have required each farmer to increase production output by 5600 percent.

The British government built a wharf at Sekondi that essentially altered the commercial dynamics on the coast as Cape Coast became a less thriving city. Prominent barristers such as Casely-Hayford, Ribeiro, Charles Bannerman, Hutton-Mills, Renner and Sapara-Williams, of that era moved their law practices to other cities such as Accra, Axim and Takoradi. To entice the return of these urban professionals, Sey acquired many old empty buildings in Cape Coast to be used on a rent-free basis, including Candle House, Commissariat House, de-Graft House, Palm House, Fordgate House No.2, PWD Building, Rose Pillars, Colonial School, Russel House, Standard Bank Building, and of the Court building, among others.

He funded the efforts to bring back native chiefs in exile, Elmina's Kobena Gyan and the Asantehene Prempeh I from distant lands such as Seychelles. Sey also built a model of a palm wine pot at the city centre, a homage to his early beginnings and the connection to the acquisition of wealth.

He financially supported the Methodist Church in Cape Coast through the renovation of church buildings, funding of chorister robes, purchase of hymn books and church organs. He opted to pay the remuneration of the church's missionaries and ministers. Additionally, he performed similar acts of benevolence to other Christian denominations in Cape Coast.

He donated a portion of his estate to the Methodist Church Ghana, leading to the founding of one of Ghana’s oldest and most influential secondary schools, Mfantsipim.

Mfantsipim was established as a joint venture between the Methodist Church and the Aborigines' Rights Protection Society.

In time, the hill on which it stands came to be known as Kwabotwe—a contraction of Kwaa Bonyi ne Botwe—meaning "The Hill of Kwaa Bonyi".

== Speaking style ==
Sey's speech style was that of a comedian and he habitually combined English and Fanti words in his sentences. An example of this "Fantenglish" is "The Epo Prams of the sea has nothing to do with Akesaw's Podise" – meaning: "The high tides of the sea have nothing to do with a crablet."

== Personal life ==
He was married to Agnes Charlotte Amba Kosimah Morgue. Sey was a lifelong Methodist and a regular churchgoer. He was also known to have held prayer meetings in his home. His descendants include a grandchild, Jacob Ewusi Wilson Sey; great-grandchildren, Jacob Panyin Wilson Sey and Jacob Kakra Wilson Sey; great-great-grandchildren, Victoria Ewusiwaa Wilson Sey and Jacob Nii Otto Wilson Sey.

== Death and legacy ==
Jacob Wilson Sey died in his 70th year in his home at Cape Coast, on 22 May 1902. His remains were buried next to his wife's grave at the cemetery near Cape Coast Town Hall. His foresight in leading and financing the ARPS mediation efforts forestalled land reclamation-related bloodshed that characterized similar nationalist campaigns in other African countries such as Zimbabwe. The Oguaa Traditional Council of Cape Coast renovated the "Gothic House", a colonial building that belonged to Jacob Wilson Sey, into a multi-purpose modern palace.
