= Order of the Volta =

Ghanaian order of merit

Awarded by President of Ghana
- Type: Order
- Established: 1960
- Status: Currently awarded
- Grand Master: President of Ghana
- Grades: companion, officer, member

Precedence
- Next (higher): Order of the Star of Ghana
- Ribbon bar of the order

The Order of the Volta is an order of merit from the Republic of Ghana. It was instituted in 1960 and is awarded to people for their outstanding service to the country.

== Grades ==
There are three grades with a civil and military division each:

- Companion (CV) – Civil Division, Military Division, Honorary Division
- Officer (OV) – Civil Division, Military Division, Honorary Division
- Member (MV) – Civil Division, Military Division, Police Division, Honorary Division

The ribbon bar of the order is navy blue with red borders and a central black stripe.

== Recipients ==
Companions (CV)

- Valentina Tereshkova (1964)
- Azzu Mate Kole II (1969)
- Bawa Andani Yakubu (1969)
- Samuel Azu Crabbe (1977)
- Kwabena Darko (1978)
- Robert K. A. Gardiner (1978)
- George Commey Mills-Odoi (1978)
- Fred Kwasi Apaloo (1979)
- Robert Patrick Baffour (1979)
- V. C. R. A. C. Crabbe (1979)
- Abedi Pele (1996)
- Mary Grant (1997)
- Kofi Bentum Quantson (1997)
- Joseph Henry Smith (2001)
- James Aggrey-Orleans (2006)
- Emmanuel Quaye Archampong (2006)
- Joyce Aryee (2006)
- Melody Millicent Danquah (2006)
- Francis Lodonu (2006)
- Ivan Addae Mensah (2006)
- Ajoa Yeboah-Afari (2006)
- Patrick Awuah Jr. (2007)
- Charles Agyin-Asare (2007)
- Paul Victor Obeng (P. V. Obeng) (2007)
- Atukwei Okai (2007)
- Mensa Otabil (2007)
- Fred Amugi (2008)
- Sam Korankye Ankrah (2008)
- Grace Bediako (2008)
- Eric Christopher Djamson (2008)
- Bert Koenders (2008)
- Kwaku Sakyi-Addo (2008)
- Roland Issifu Alhassan (2008)
- Clifford Nii Boi Tagoe (2008)
- Francis Allotey (2009)
- Kwaku Ohene-Frempong (2010)
- A. K. B. Ampiah (2011)
- Bridget Katsriku (2011)
- David Ghartey-Tagoe (2011) Ref
- Harry Sawyerr (2011)
- Jane Naana Opoku-Agyemang (2011)
- Prince Al-Waleed bin Talal bin Abdulaziz al Saud (2015)
- Agnes Aggrey-Orleans (2015)
- Kwabena Duffuor (2015)
- Joshua Alabi (2016)
- Commodore Stephen Obimpeh (2016)
- Kofi Totobi Quakyi (2016)
- Alhaji Iddrisu Huudu (2016)
- Dr Kwabena Adjei (2016)
- Vice Admiral Matthew Quashie (2016)
- Major General Richard Kwame Opoku-Adusei (2016)
- Rear-Admiral Geoffrey Mawuli Biekro (2016)

Various

- Kwame Addo Kufour
- Mrs Regina Ayerko Apotsi
- Marian Ewurama Addy
- Peter Ala Adjetey
- Ivor Agyeman-Duah
- Nana Addo Danquah Akufo-Addo
- Dr Kofi Konadu Apraku Sr.
- Gladys Asmah
- Kwadwo Baah-Wiredu
- James Barnor
- Aida Desta
- Ablade Glover
- Enoch Teye Mensah
- Paa Kwesi Nduom
- Hackman Owusu-Agyeman
- Nathan Quao
- Frank Gibbs Torto

== See also ==
- Orders, decorations, and medals of Ghana
