= Kofi Bentum Quantson =

Ghanaian security intelligence expert (born 1934)

Kofi Bentum Quantson (born 6 July 1934) is a Ghanaian security intelligence expert who rose through the ranks after joining the Special Branch of the Ghana Police Service as a young detective to become Director. He later became the Director of the Bureau of National Investigations when the Special Branch was reorganized and renamed BNI.

== Early life ==
Kofi was born on 6 July 1934 at Axim in the Western Region of Ghana.

== Education ==
Kofi had his secondary education at Clayborn College Sekondi, an unassisted (private) secondary school, as it was called at the time. He went on to do his senior Cambridge Examination and then went to Wesley College in Kumasi where he was trained as a Teacher. He later attended the University of Ghana in Legon.

== Career ==
Kofi started his career as a Teacher where he taught in a number of schools before pursuing further studies at the University of Ghana, Legon. After his University education, he worked with the Ghanaian Times Newspaper as a features editor before joining the Special Branch of the Ghana Police Service which later became the Bureau of National Investigations (BNI). He rose to become its director in 1979. He also rose through the ranks to become Commissioner of Police in Charge of the Criminal Investigative Department (CID) of the Ghana Police Service. After retiring from the Ghana Police Service in 1989, he was recalled to establish the Narcotics Control Board of Ghana of which he became Executive Secretary. He also doubled as the National Security Co-ordinator until January 2001, retiring in March of the same year.

== Awards ==
Kofi Bentum Quantson has won several awards as a public servant in his various capacities.

- In November 1999 he was awarded the ECOWAS Drug Control Merit Award in Dakar, Senegal in recognition of his outstanding contribution to the war against drug abuse and illicit trafficking in West Africa.
- On the 40th Anniversary of Ghana's Independence on 6 March 1997, he was awarded the Companion of the Order of the Volta (CV), Civil Division, for his meritorious Public Service.

== Books ==
Kofi Bentum Quantson has written and published about six books on security in Ghana.

- Ghana: Peace and Stability: Chapters from the Intelligence Sector.
- Cocaine hits drug family, mama don't die.
- National Security: The Dilemma.
- The fury of the prophet.
- Travelling and Seeing.
- Security in the Hand of God (My amazing testimony)
