= Werner Eggert =

Werner Eggert (born in Ibbenbüren) is a German journalist and the Director as well as the Chairman of the Management Board of "The Interlink Academy for International Dialogue and Journalism" (not for profit).

Werner Eggert studied journalism, political science and economics in Hamburg and London and worked as a journalist for print, radio, TV and online publications for many years. In the 1990s, he worked for the German weekly newspaper Deutsches Allgemeines Sonntagsblatt and for the Internet company 1 und 1, where he set up a news site for economic and financial information. Also, he lived for several years in southern Africa, where he worked as a coach and consultant for the Namibian Broadcasting Corporation in Windhoek.

From 2003 to 2007, Werner Eggert worked at the International Institute for Journalism (now part of GIZ) in Germany’s capital city Berlin, where he was responsible for designing and organizing training courses in multimedia, online journalism, business journalism and media ethics. In 2007 Werner Eggert became Editor-in-Chief and Managing Director of TIDE, an educational channel for TV and Radio in Hamburg.

In 2010, media enterprise Bertelsmann SE & Co. KGaA appointed him as Founding Director of the International Academy of Journalism (Intajour). He led Intajour until its closure in 2014.

In 2014, Werner Eggert founded the Interlink Academy for International Dialog and Journalism, an international journalism school, and has been its Managing Director ever since. From 2017 to 2020, he was also a permanent consultant with the Myanmar Journalism Institute in Yangon. Werner Eggert is specialized in the digitization of journalism education, both at a teaching method and as a training subject, and has written a contribution to the essay collection Journalism and Journalism Education in Developing Countries.

From 2017 to 2019, Werner Eggert was a member of the Board of Directors of the Global Investigative Journalists Network GIJN .

== Publications ==
- https://www.dandc.eu/de/article/anbieter-von-journalistischen-fortbildungskursen-sollten-unterricht-anschliessend-im
- http://onmedia.dw-akademie.de/english/?p=22001
