= James Aggrey-Orleans =

Ghanaian civil servant and diplomat

James Aggrey-Orleans CV

High Commissioner of Ghana to the United Kingdom and Ambassador of Ghana to the Republic of Ireland
- In office October 1997 – March 2001

Personal details
- Born: James Emmanuel Kwegyir Aggrey-Orleans; 11 October 1937 Sekondi-Takoradi, Gold Coast
- Died: 19 November 2018 (aged 81) Accra, Ghana
- Spouse: Agnes Aggrey-Orleans
- Relations: James Emman Kwegyir Aggrey (great-uncle); Francis Lodowic Bartels (father-in-law)
- Children: James E. K. Aggrey-Orleans; B. L. Kweku Aggrey-Orleans
- Parents: William Percival Brown Orleans (father); Berthod Eliza Jones (mother)
- Education: Mfantsipim School; University College of Ghana / University of London (B.A.); University of Bordeaux; Ghana Institute of Management and Public Administration (PGDip); St Antony's College, Oxford
- Occupation: Diplomat

James Emmanuel Kwegyir Aggrey-Orleans, CV (11 October 1937 – 19 November 2018) was a Ghanaian civil servant and diplomat who served as Ghana's High Commissioner to the United Kingdom and Ambassador of Ghana to the Republic of Ireland from October 1997 to March 2001.

== Early life and education ==
James Emmanuel Kwegyir Aggrey-Orleans was born in Sekondi-Takoradi on 11 October 1937. His parents were William Percival Brown Orleans and Berthod Eliza Jones. Aggrey-Orleans had 5 other siblings. He was named after his paternal great-uncle, James Emman Kwegyir Aggrey, the Gold Coast educator who co-founded Achimota School. An ethnic Fante, he attended the Government Boys School, Bakaanu and the all-boys Methodist boarding school, Mfantsipim School in Cape Coast, together with Kofi Annan (1938–2018), a Ghanaian diplomat who served as the seventh Secretary-General of the United Nations from 1997 to 2006. He proceeded to the then University College of Ghana and earned a bachelor's degree from the University of London in French Language and Literature. Aggrey-Orleans studied French at the University of Bordeaux and pursued a four-year research postgraduate course in politics and diplomacy. He graduated in public administration in 1963 from the Ghana Institute of Management and Public Administration. In 1970, he studied international relations at St Antony's College, Oxford and was a member of the college's Senior Common Room between 2001 and 2004.

== Career ==
J. E. K. Aggrey-Orleans joined the administrative class of the Ghanaian Foreign and Diplomatic Service in 1963. Between 1966 and 1970, he was a foreign service officer and First Secretary at the Ghana Permanent Mission to the United Nations in New York. He rose through the ranks to become the Chief of State Protocol at the Ministry of Foreign Affairs, from 1975 to 1979. His responsibilities at the time involved training diplomats before they set off to their foreign duty posts. He was the Acting Clerk of Parliament between 1979 and 1981, during the regime of Hilla Limann. He also served as the Head of the Parliamentary Service. He was the Deputy Resident Manager of the Volta Aluminium Company in Tema from July 1983 to September 1986. From October 1986 to September 1987, he was a consultant at the World Social Prospects Association (Association Mondiale de Perspectives Sociales) in Geneva, Switzerland.

He also served as the assistant director of Economic Information and Market Intelligence of the International Tropical Timber Organisation (ITTO), a Yokohama-based commodity organization, established in 1987 by the UN to promote tropical forest conservation and timber trade. He remained in this position from October 1987 to September 1997. He was appointed the Special Political Advisor to the United Nations Peacekeeping Operations in la Côte d'Ivoire. J. E. K. Aggrey-Orleans was a lecturer at the Kofi Annan Peacekeeping Training Centre. He was Ghana's High Commissioner to the United Kingdom and Ambassador to the Republic of Ireland from October 1997 to March 2001. He was engaged as a consultant to the African Centre for Economic Transformation, the Parliament of Ghana and the Ghanaian Judiciary. He also spoke at various conferences of the erstwhile Organisation of African Unity, now the African Union in addition to events at the UN, the Commonwealth of Nations, and the Inter-Parliamentary Union.

After his retirement from the diplomatic service, he was engaged in the public speaking circuit and maintained close ties with the Foreign Affairs Ministry. In a public lecture, “The Fundamental Principle of Protocol and the Importance of Protocol in Inter-State, Inter-Corporate and Inter-Faith Relations” at the 2017 Protocol Matters Conference in Accra, he was noted to have said “matters of diplomacy must be promoted to what he described as ‘diplomatic behaviour’ in every Ghanaian…adding that everybody in society must be considered an agent of diplomacy, which was a secret tool for successful relations among states, representation of identities as well as negotiations between states and institutions.”

== Personal life ==
He was married to Agnes Y. Aggrey-Orleans (née Bartels), a fellow diplomat. The couple had 2 sons, James E. K. and B. L. Kweku Aggrey-Orleans. He was a lifelong Methodist. He was an external patron of Club UK, a social organisation for Diaspora Ghanaians from the United Kingdom. Aggrey-Orleans was also a Freemason, belonging to the District Grand Lodge of Ghana of the United Grand Lodge of England. His contemporaries in the Masonic Lodge include diplomat, K. B. Asante and the jurist and judge, V.C.R.A.C Crabbe, Otumfuo Osei Tutu II, the Asantehene, the Grand Patron of the Grand Lodge of Ghana; and former President of Ghana, John Agyekum Kufuor, the Senior Grand Warden of the United Grand Lodge of England.

== Death and funeral ==
James Emmanuel Kwegyir Aggrey-Orleans died at dawn on 19 November 2018 at the age of 81. His funeral service was held at the Accra Ridge Church, after which his remains were buried at the Gethsemane Memorial Garden, Shiashie, also in Accra.

== Works ==
- Commonwealth Secretariat Report: Review of Relations between the Official and Unofficial Commonwealth (August 2001)
- (contrib.) Transition of the OAU to the African Union: Transition Capacity Building Needs and Interim Arrangement (2002)
- Conflict Resolution and African Diplomacy: Idealpolitik and Realpolitik. University of Ghana Alumni Lecture (2011)

== Awards and honours ==
- Officier de l’Ordre de Palmes Academiques, Alliance Française in Ghana (1984)
- Companion of the Order of the Volta (2006)
- Honorary Doctor of Laws Degree (LLD), University of Ghana (2013)
