= Ghana Institution of Surveyors =

The Ghana Institution of Surveyors (GhIS) was established on 28 February 1969. It is the leading source of professional advice on Landed Property and Construction in Ghana. It was established out of the Ghana Branch of the Royal Institution of Chartered Surveyors following a resolution during the annual general meeting in 1969. Members of the Institute of Quantity Surveyors and the Licensed Surveyors Association practising in Ghana at the time were also incorporated at the beginning.

The first President of the institution was Harry Sawyerr. He was re-elected at the annual general meeting on 28 August 1970 when a new constitution was adopted.

== Structure ==
The highest authority of the Institution is the Governing Council. This is made up of Executive Officers including an Executive Director, elected representatives from the various divisions of the Institution and co-opted members. The co-opted members include the immediate past president and representatives of selected academic institutions. The divisions include Land Surveying, Quantity Surveying and Valuation and Estate Surveying. The Kwame Nkrumah University of Science and Technology (KNUST) is one of the academic institutions with representation on the Governing Council.

== Governing Council ==
This includes the president, senior vice-president and vice president, an honorary treasurer and honorary secretary. Each of the three divisions also has six members on the council.

== Past presidents ==
- Harry R. Sawyerr 1969 - 1971
- E. A. Abbam 1971 - 1972
- K. R. Quist 1972 - 1974
- A. H. Osei 1974 - 1975
- Ben Acquaye 1975 - 1976
- Edwin Addo-Tawiah 2017 - 2018

== External links and sources ==
- Official website
