= Kofi Dsane-Selby =

Ghanaian diplomat (1931 - 2017)

Ambassador of Ghana
- President: Kofi Abrefa Busia, John Kufuor

Personal details
- Born: Kofi Nyann Dsane-Selby; 1931 Saltpond
- Died: 18 July 2017 (aged 85–86) Accra
- Party: New Patriotic Party
- Children: 8
- Education: Mfantsipim School

Dr. Kofi Dsane-Selby (also known as Kofi Nyann Dsane-Selby, 1931 - 18 July 2017) was a former Ambassador of Ghana during the Busia and Kufour regimes.

== Early life and education ==
He hailed from Saltpond in the Central Region of Ghana. He attended Mfantsipim School and completed in 1950.

== Career ==
He was a medical doctor by profession. He was also a former President of the Ghana Medical Association. He was also a former chairman for Asante Kotoko in the 1960s.

== Political life ==
He was a founding member of the New Patriotic Party. He contested for the NPP's flagbearership in 1992 and also in 1996 during the party's primaries.

== Ambassadorial role ==
He was the Ambassador of Ghana to France from 1970 to 1972.

== Personal life ==
He was married to Rosamond Dsane-Selby and they had eight children. His father was Ekow Nyanka Selby and his mother was Madam Lydia Okan Kai Dsane. He was a Freemason and a Methodist.

== Awards ==
In 2008, he received the Order of the Star – Companion Award due to his contribution to Ghana's politics, public service and healthcare.

== Death and burial ==
Selby died on 18 July 2017 at Korle Bu Teaching Hospital in Accra. On 10 September 2017, he was buried in Cape Coast.
