= Willem Essuman Pietersen =

Gold Coast merchant, politician and educationist

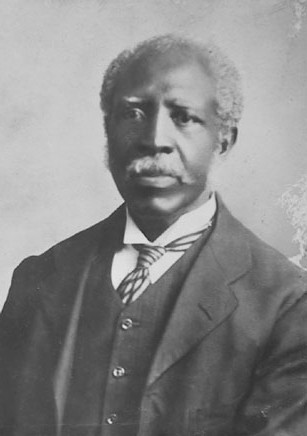

President of the Aborigines' Rights Protection Society
- Preceded by: J. E. Casely Hayford
- Succeeded by: J. E. Biney

Personal details
- Born: ca. 1844 Elmina, Dutch Gold Coast
- Died: 6 January 1914
- Spouse: Nancy Akyere

Willem Essuman Pietersen (c. 1844 – 6 January 1914), also known as Willem Edmund Pietersen, was a Gold Coast merchant, politician, and educationist. He is also remembered as a goldsmith and watch repairer. Pietersen was co-founder of Mfantsipim School in Cape Coast, Ghana.

== Biography ==
=== Early years in Elmina ===
Pietersen was born in Elmina to Essuman and Nana Ambaam. His paternal grandfather Nana Kobina Gwira had introduced the salt industry to Elmina. He was educated at the Dutch government school of Elmina, and was employed as a clerk for the Dutch governor of Elmina on 30 April 1864. He was however fired on 24 November of the same year because of unsuitability. Pietersen then became a trader and a personal clerk to Mr. Stoové, before establishing himself as a goldsmith and watchmaker.

During the early 1870s, it became apparent that the Dutch would soon cede their possessions on the Gold Coast to the British, which led to protest among the Elminese and Ashanti, who feared an end to their substantial autonomy in a Gold Coast increasingly dominated by the United Kingdom. Pietersen, however, was part of the pro-British faction in Elmina led by George Emil Eminsang, who later became the first mayor installed in Elmina by the British. Pietersen was a member of the Gold Coast Volunteers and took part in the Fante-Elmina war of 1868 and in the Third Anglo-Ashanti War. He left Elmina after the British bombardment of the town in 1873, and moved to Cape Coast.

=== Cape Coast ===
In Cape Coast, Pietersen founded a flourishing business under the name W.E. Pieterson & Co. For a time, he was a business partner of Hendrik Vroom. He also started his political career in Cape Coast, eventually becoming president of the Aborigines' Rights Protection Society in 1907.

Pietersen already had links to the Wesleyan mission in Cape Coast before 1873, and became an active member of the Wesleyan Church after moving to Cape Coast. Among other things, he was superintendent of Sunday Schools, and a lay member of Synod.

Pietersen died on 6 January 1914 of cardiac failure, after having been ill for eight weeks. He was buried the next day at the Old Wesleyan Cemetery.

== Personal life ==
Pietersen married Nancy Akyere and had two sons and two daughters with her. Pietersen was the maternal uncle of Henry van Hien and the maternal grandfather of Kobina Sekyi. Pietersen regarded Kobina Sekyi as his heir, and even accompanied him to the United Kingdom when Sekyi started his law studies there.

== Bibliography ==
- Doortmont, Michel (2004). The pen-pictures of modern Africans and African celebrities by Charles Francis Hutchison: a collective biography of elite society in the Gold Coast Colony. Leiden: Brill. ISBN 9789004140974.
- Jenkins, Ray G. (1985). Gold Coast Historians and their Pursuit of the Gold Coast Pasts: 1882-1917. Birmingham: University of Birmingham.
