= Ghana Statistical Service =

Government agency

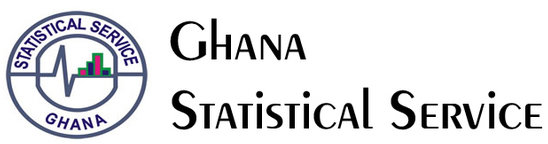
Ghana Statistical Service

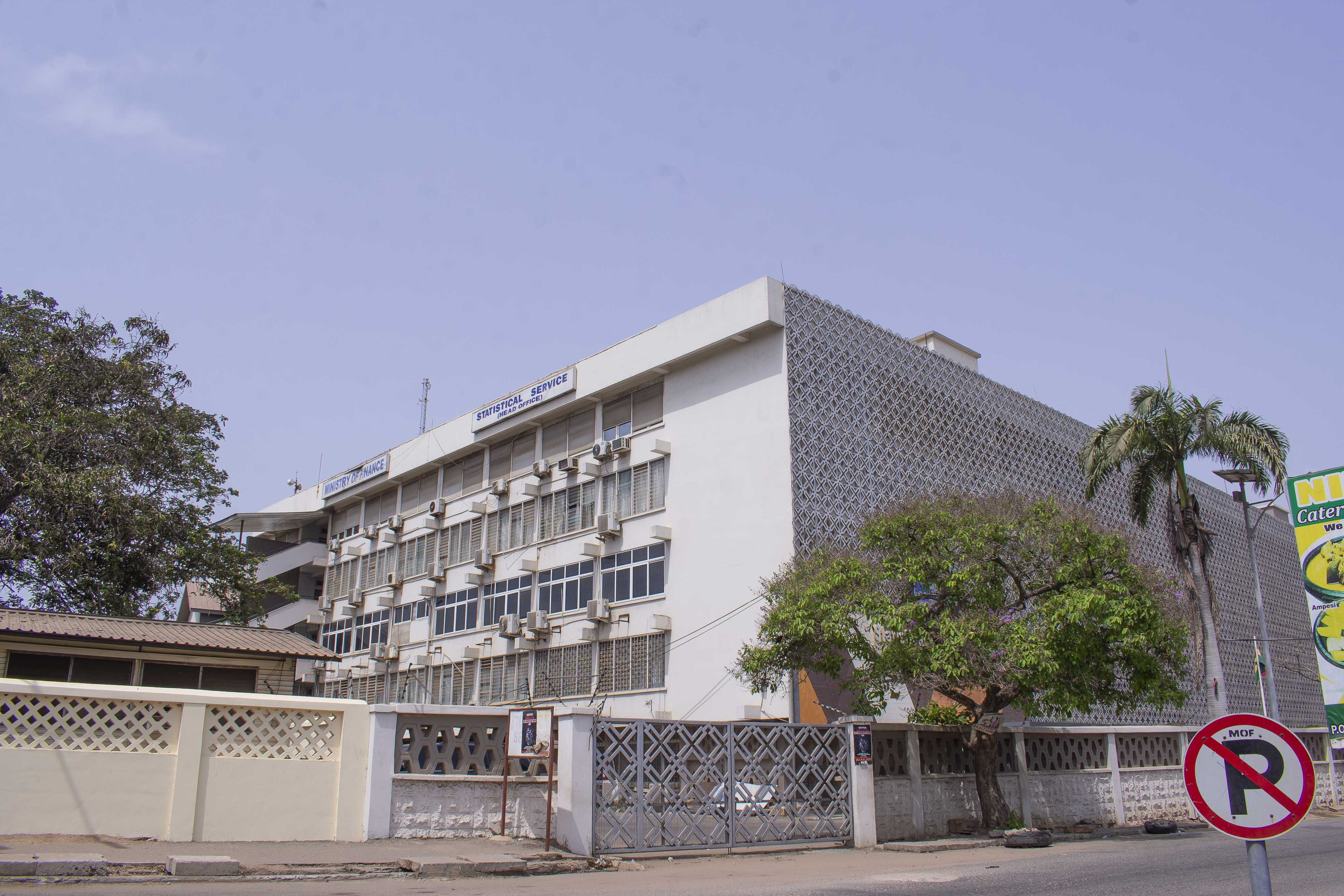
Ghana Statistical Service

The Ghana Statistical Service (GSS) is a Ghanaian governing body established to report to the presidency. The GSS conducts Population and Housing Census in the country.

== History ==
The GSS is a Public Service body established under the Statistical Service Law 135 in 1985 by the PNDC. The first population census in Ghana began in 1891 as efforts were made to collect and disseminate statistical information.

== Services ==
- The Ghana Statistical Service is in charge of organizing and handling of the Population and Housing Census amongst other data collection exercises.
- The service handles some high-quality data gathered in Ghana. Currently, they habour data on Ghana Living Standards Survey, Annual Household Income surveys, amongst others.
- It also provides year-on year Performance on key areas of the economy

== Past Heads of GSS ==
- Grace Bediako (2004–2013)
- Philomena Nyarko (2013–2016)
- Dr. Alhassan Iddrisu (Incumbment)
