= Harry Sawyerr =

Ghanaian politician (1926–2013)

The Honourable Harry Sawyerr F.R.I.C.S., F.R.V.A., F.I.AR.B., F.R.S.H., CV

Member of the Ghana Parliament for Osu-Klottey
- In office September 1969 – 13 January 1972

Minister for Education
- In office 1993–1997
- President: Jerry Rawlings
- Preceded by: Alex Ababio
- Succeeded by: Esi Sutherland-Addy

Minister for Transport and Communications
- In office September 1979 – 31 December 1981
- President: Hilla Limann

Personal details
- Born: Henry Romulus Sawyerr; 25 April 1926 Abokobi, Accra, Gold Coast (now Ghana)
- Died: 8 November 2013 (aged 87) Accra, Ghana
- Party: United National Convention (1979 – 1981); New Generation Alliance (1992); National Democratic Congress (1992-2013)
- Spouse: Esther Sawyerr
- Education: Accra Academy
- Alma mater: University College of Estate Management
- Occupation: Politician, surveyor, valuer

Henry Romulus Sawyerr, CV (25 April 1926 – 8 November 2013) was a Ghanaian politician and surveyor. Under the Fourth Republic, he was Minister for Education from 1993 to 1997 in Jerry Rawlings' first presidential term of office. In the Second Republic, Sawyerr was Member of Parliament (MP) for Osu-Klottey as a non-party candidate, the only non-party candidate elected. In the Third Republic, he was again elected MP but gave up the seat to be in Hilla Limann's cabinet as Minister for Transport and Communications from 1979 to 1981. He was nominated by Limann despite not belonging to Limann’s political party.

== Early life and education ==
Harry Sawyerr was born on 25 April 1926 in Abokobi, Accra, in the Ga East District, to Kwao Sawyerr and Fredericka Naa Awula Akua Lokko.

Sawyerr had his elementary education at the Presbyterian Primary School at Abokobi from 1932 to 1938, continuing in 1938 to the Salem School at Osu. He studied at Accra Academy for his secondary education from 1942 to 1946. He entered Achimota College in 1947, but on the sudden death of his father that year, Sawyerr's degree studies ended due to lack of funds.

Sawyerr became a Learner Valuer at the Lands Department from 1951 to 1953. He studied estate management in England at the University College of Estate Management from 1953 to 1955, becoming a certified associate of the Royal Institution of Chartered Surveyors and of the Chartered Institute of Arbitrators, in England.

== Career ==
He worked as a District Valuer at the Lands Department in Accra from 1955 to 1958, then left public service to establish a private consultancy from 1958 to 1962. In 1962, Sawyerr was made the City Valuer at the Kumasi City Council, but after only a year, he left for Nigeria where he worked as Chief Federal Lands Officer from 1963 to 1967 as the first black Chief Federal Lands Officer in Nigeria.

On his return to Ghana, Sawyerr went into private practice under the firm Sawyerr and Co., where he served as managing director. Sawyerr was the first president of the Ghana Institution of Surveyors. He served two terms spanning 1969 to 1971. He was Convener of the Association of Recognised Professional Bodies (ARPB), from 1971 to 1979 and led the organisation to object to military governance in Ghana.

In March 1983, the PNDC government appointed Sawyerr as chairman of the newly-established Land Valuations Board.

== Politics ==
His political career began as a member of the Ghana Congress Party led by Kofi Abrefa Busia.

Sawyerr was made a member of the 1969 Constituent Assembly that drew up the 1969 Constitution for the Second Republic of Ghana. He contested the 1969 parliamentary election in the Osu-Klottey constituency as a non-party candidate and won. He was the only non-party candidate to win a seat in the Parliament of the Second Republic.

At the onset of the Third Republic, he was a founding member and national treasurer of the United National Convention (UNC) whose flagbearer was William Ofori-Atta. Sawyerr stood for election to parliament at the Osu-Klottey constituency on the ticket of the UNC. He won the parliamentary seat but gave it up to serve as Minister for Transport and Communications from 1979 to 1981 in the Limann government, as the Third Republic Constitution did not permit parliament members to become cabinet ministers.

In 1992, Sawyerr and veteran politicians; Sam Okudzeto, Patrick Quaidoo and E. A. K. Akuoko formed the New Generation Alliance as a political movement in anticipation of a democratic return. Sawyerr soon broke away from the party. Sawyerr joined the National Democratic Congress (NDC) in 1992, and was a member of its first national executives as party Vice Chairman. He was the Chairman of the NDC's 1992 National Campaign Committee.

In government, he served as Minister for Education in the Rawlings government from 1993 to 1997. Prior to this, he had been the Executive Chairman of the University of Ghana Medical School since 1990. He was the first Minister for Education in the Fourth Ghanaian Republic. In 1997, Sawyerr was reassigned as a member of the Council of State during the 2nd presidential term of Rawlings, on which he served until 2000. He was Vice Chairman of the council of elders of the NDC from 2010 to 2012.

== Sports ==
Sawyerr served as a longstanding vice-chairman of the Council of Patrons of Accra Hearts of Oak S.C. and later became the President of the football club's Council of Patrons.

== Personal life ==
Harry Sawyerr was a Freemason, belonging to the District Grand Lodge of Ghana under the United Grand Lodge of England.

== Recognition ==
Sawyerr was the first Executive Chairman of the University of Ghana Medical School, appointed in 1990. There are prizes at the University of Ghana Medical School in his name.

In 2011, Sawyerr was decorated with the Companion of the Order of the Volta, the highest award in Ghana, by the then President John Evans Atta Mills.

== Death and funeral ==
Sawyerr died on 8 November 2013 in Accra, aged 87. His funeral was attended by several government officials and dignitaries. He was buried at the Basel Mission Cemetery in Osu.

== See also ==
- List of MPs elected in the 1969 Ghanaian parliamentary election
- List of MPs elected in the 1979 Ghanaian parliamentary election
- Limann government
- Rawlings government

Parliament of Ghana
Preceded by New Parliament	MP for Osu-Klottey; 1979 – 81	Succeeded by Parliament abolished
Political offices
Preceded by	Minister for Transport and Communications; 1979 – 81	Succeeded by
Preceded by Mary Grant	Minister for Education; 1993 – 97	Succeeded by Esi Sutherland-Addy
