= Hendrik Doijer =

Dutch politician

Mayor of Woerden
- In office 1873–1883
- Preceded by: Johannes Nolen
- Succeeded by: Matthijs Willem Schalij

Mayor of Zoeterwoude
- In office 1871–1873
- Preceded by: Pieter van Outeren
- Succeeded by: Hendrik Hemmingson

Governor of the Dutch Gold Coast
- ad interim
- In office 13 June 1864 – 7 December 1864
- Monarch: William III of the Netherlands
- Preceded by: Carel van Hien
- Succeeded by: Henri Alexander Elias

Personal details
- Born: 14 September 1830 Amsterdam, Netherlands
- Died: 13 April 1906 (aged 75) Velp, Netherlands
- Spouse: Sandrina Christina Enschedé

Hendrik Doijer Jzn (born 14 September 1830 – 13 April 1906) was a Dutch politician, who first made a career in the administration on the Dutch Gold Coast and who became interim governor during the European leave of governor Henri Alexander Elias on 13 June 1864, upon the death of his interim predecessor Carel van Hien. He later became mayor of Zoeterwoude and Woerden.

== Biography ==
Doijer was born in Amsterdam to painter Jacobus Schoemaker Doyer and Petronella Evekink.

Hendrik Doijer established himself as a merchant on the Gold Coast in 1851, joining his brother Huibert, who had been an agent for H. van Rijckevorsel & Co. since 1849. In 1853, Hendrik and Huibert founded the company Doijer Brothers in Elmina. Unlike his brother Huibert, who always remained a private merchant, Hendrik joined the Dutch colonial administration in 1856.
