= Bridget Katsriku =

Mrs. Bridget Katsriku

Public Service Commission
- Incumbent
- Assumed office 2011

Ministry of Tourism

Ministry of Employment and Social Welfare

Bridget Katsriku is a Ghanaian public servant and currently the Chairperson of the Public Services Commission and the first female Chairperson of the Public Services Commission of Ghana. She was sworn into office by the late President John Atta Mills on 7 March 2011.

== Education ==
Katsriku is a product of Keta Senior High Technical School and the University of Ghana, Legon, with a degree in the Arts. She holds a postgraduate Diploma in Public Administration, and other postgraduate certificates in Management, Public Policy, Manpower Planning and Auditing.

== Career ==
Katsriku joined the Civil Service in September 1975. She has held many high positions in the Civil and Public Services of Ghana, including Chief Director of two government ministries, the Ministry of Employment and Social Welfare and the Ministry of Tourism. She was instrumental in the establishment of the Ghana AIDS Commission and acted as its first Executive Secretary for one and a half years, other policies she initiated are the National Disability Policy, a Policy on NGO-Government Relations, Aging, Street Children, Co-operatives Development, HIV/AIDS at the workplace, HIV/AIDS District Response Initiative and Tourism policy.

== Awards and recognition. ==
Katsriku is currently the vice-chair of the African Association of Public Administration and Management (AAPAM) headquartered in Nairobi, Kenya, representing the whole of West Africa

She has won several awards, including Best Worker in the Civil Service in 2007 and a National Award of the Order of the Volta in 2011, for her excellence and contribution to the Public Service.
