= John Mensah Sarbah =

Ghanaian lawyer and politician (1864–1910)

John Mensah Sarbah CMG
- Born: 3 June 1864; Anomabu, Gold Coast
- Died: 27 November 1910 (aged 46)
- Education: Queen's College, Taunton; Mfantsipim School
- Alma mater: Lincoln's Inn
- Occupations: Lawyer; Political leader
- Known for: Co-founder of Aborigines' Rights Protection Society

John Mensah Sarbah CMG (3 June 1864 – 27 November 1910) was a prominent lawyer and political leader in the Gold Coast (now Ghana). He is also known as a founder of Mfantsipim School. In 1897, he was a co-founder of the Aborigines' Rights Protection Society, which organised and led opposition against the colonial government, laying the foundation for Ghanaian independence.

== Life ==
John Mensah Sarbah was born on Friday, 3 June 1864, in Anomabu, in the Fante Confederacy in the Gold Coast. He was the eldest son of John Sarbah (1834–1892), a merchant of Anomabu and Cape Coast and a member of the Legislative Council of the Gold Coast, and his wife Sarah.

Mensah Sarbah was educated at the Cape Coast Wesleyan School (later renamed – by Mensah Sarbah himself – as Mfantsipim School) and then at Queen's College in Taunton, Somerset, England, matriculating in 1884. He subsequently entered Lincoln's Inn in London to train as a barrister, and was called to the English bar in 1887 – the first African from his country to qualify in this way.

In 1897, along with J. W. de Graft-Johnson, J. W. Sey, J. P. Brown and J. E. Casely Hayford, Mensah Sarbah co-founded the Aborigines' Rights Protection Society, which became the main political organisation that led organised and sustained opposition against the colonial government, laying the foundation for Ghanaian independence.

He was appointed a member of the Legislative Council in 1901, and was re-appointed in 1906.

In the first birthday honours of King George V, Mensah Sarbah was recognised with the award of a CMG in 1910, a few months before his sudden death at the age of 46, on Sunday, 27 November 1910.

== Personal life ==
In 1904, he married Marion Wood from Accra and they had three children.

== Contributions to education ==
John Mensah Sarbah was dedicated to the promotion of secondary education and was responsible for various initiatives, including the founding of a Dutton scholarship at Queen's College, Taunton, in memory of his younger brother, Joseph Dutton Sarbah, who had died there in 1892. In 1903, Sarbah and William Edward Sam promoted an enterprise called the Fanti Public Schools Limited and Sarbah also helped establish the Fanti National Education Fund, which aimed to improve educational facilities in the country and awarded scholarships. He founded a scholarship scheme called the Dutton Sarbah Scholarship at Mfantsipim School and helped pay the salaries of the staff when the school encountered financial difficulties.

== Legacy ==
In 1963, a residence hall of the University of Ghana was named Mensah Sarbah Hall in his honour for his services to education, with a statue of John Mensah Sarbah in front of it. Members of the hall are known as Vikings as a reference to him who is a true Viking for his country. Sarbah-Picot House at Mfantsipim School is named after him.

== Selected bibliography ==
- 1897 – Fanti Customary Laws: a brief introduction to the principles of the native laws and customs of the Fanti and Akan districts of the Gold Coast, with a report of some cases thereon decided in the Law Courts
- 1904 – Fanti Law Reports
- 1906 – The Fanti National Constitution: a short treatise on the constitution and government of the Fanti, Asanti, and other Akan tribes of West Africa, together with a brief account of the discovery of the Gold Coast by Portuguese navigators, a short narration of English voyages, and a study of the rise of British Gold Coast jurisdiction, etc., etc.
- 1909 – The Palm Oil and Its Products
