= Agnes Aggrey-Orleans =

Ghanaian diplomat

Agnes Yahan Aggrey-Orleans OV
- Born: Agnes Yahan Bartels
- Education: Wesley Girls High School; University of Ghana
- Occupation: Diplomat
- Spouse: James Aggrey-Orleans
- Children: James E. K. Aggrey-Orleans; B. L. Kweku Aggrey-Orleans
- Parent: Francis Lodowic Bartels (father)
- Awards: Order of the Volta (2015)

Agnes Yahan Aggrey-Orleans (née Bartels), OV, is a Ghanaian diplomat, considered the first female career diplomat in Ghana.

== Biography ==
Her father was Francis Lodowic Bartels, an educator and diplomat who became the first Ghanaian principal of Mfantsipim School. Agnes Aggrey-Orleans received her secondary education at the Wesley Girls High School in Cape Coast Ghana. She then attended the University of Ghana. She was married to the Ghanaian diplomat, James Aggrey-Orleans (1937–2018) who served as the Ghanaian High Commissioner to the United Kingdom from October 1997 to March 2001. Her diplomatic career included positions in various Ghana Missions, including those in New York and the Holy See. She invested as a Member of Order of the Volta Award in 2015 by the then President of Ghana John Dramani Mahama.
