= Kobina Sekyi =

Gold Coast lawyer and writer (1892–1956)

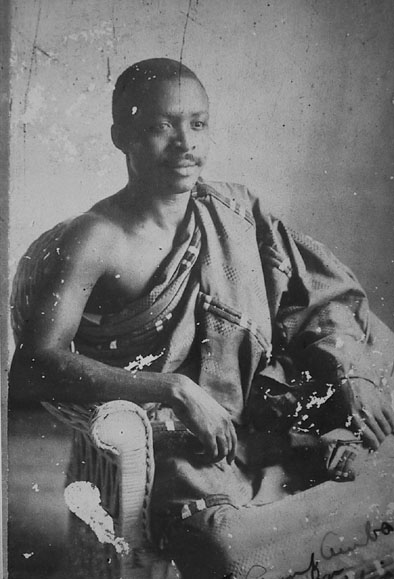

Member of the National Congress of British West Africa

President of the Aborigines' Rights Protection Society
- Preceded by: Henry van Hien

Personal details
- Born: 1 November 1892 Cape Coast, Gold Coast
- Died: 1956 (aged 63–64) Cape Coast, Gold Coast
- Spouse: Lilly Anna Cleanand
- Education: Mfantsipim School
- Alma mater: University College London; Inner Temple

William Esuman-Gwira Sekyi, better known as Kobina Sekyi (1 November 1892, Cape Coast – 1956), was a nationalist lawyer, politician and writer in the Gold Coast.

== Biography ==
Sekyi, born on 1 November 1892 in Cape Coast, was the son of John Gladstone Sackey, headmaster of the Wesleyan School, who was himself the son of Chief Kofi Sekyi, the Chief Regent of Cape Coast and Wilhelmina Pietersen, also known as Amba Paaba, daughter of Willem Essuman Pietersen (c.1844–1914); Pietersen was an Elmina-Cape Coast businessman and one-time President of the Aborigines' Rights Protection Society, a later president of which was Sekyi's uncle, Henry van Hien, whose heir Sekyi was.

Sekyi was educated at Mfantsipim School and studied philosophy at the University College of London, accompanied to Britain by his maternal grandfather. He had originally wanted to become an engineer like his mother's younger brother, J. B. Essuman-Gwira, but because his family controlled the purse strings and they wished him to study law, that was the career he entered. Sekyi was called to the Bar from the Inner Temple in 1918. He became a lawyer in private practice in the Gold Coast. He was president of the Aborigines' Rights Protection Society (ARPS), an executive member of the National Congress of British West Africa, and member of the Coussey Committee for constitutional change.

Sekyi married Lilly Anna Cleanand, daughter of John Peter Cleanand and Elizabeth Vroom.

Sekyi was popular as the first educated elite appearing in a colonial court in Ghanaian "ntoma" cloth as a lawyer. It is believed he vowed never to wear European clothes as totally African.

He died in 1956.

== Works ==
Sekyi's comedy The Blinkards (1915) satirised the acceptance by a colonised society of the attitudes of the colonisers. His novel The Anglo-Fante, serialized in West Africa magazine in 1918, was the first English-language novel written in Cape Coast.
