= Melody Millicent Danquah =

Ghanaian aviator

Melody Millicent Danquah (6 January 1937 – 18 March 2016) was a Ghanaian pilot. She was amongst the first female pilot in Ghana and one of the earliest in Africa. She followed in the footsteps of Lotfia Elnadi who was the first Egyptian woman as well as the first woman from Africa to earn a pilot's license on 27 September 1933.

== Early life ==
Melody Danquah was born in Larteh Akuapem, on 6 January 1937 to Ibinijah Rexford Addo-Danquah, who was the illustrious Court Registrar and Arbitrator of Larteh. Her mother was Selina Gyamfi. Melody was the sixth of 10 siblings.

== Education ==
Danquah was educated at the Methodist Primary and Middle schools in Larteh and Wesley Girls High School in Cape Coast. She was also a product of the Government Secretarial School.

== Career ==
She was chosen among the first three women towards the end of 1963 to be trained in the Ghana Air Force as pilots. Unfortunately Joana Araba Dickson didn't make it due to eye complication, but Melody and Ayeley progressed on to be the first female pilots in Ghana. Melody successfully made the grade and the subsequent basic military training at the Ghana Military Academy. On 22 June 1964, Flt. Cadet Danquah flew solo for the first time in a de Havilland Canada DHC-1 Chipmunk aircraft, becoming the first Ghanaian female to fly an aeroplane international solo. Incidentally Ayele took her first solo flight a week before Melody, Technically making her the first female Pilot in Ghana.Melody and Ayele received their Wings qualifying them as pilots from Kofi Baako who was the Minister of Defence on 15 April 1965. She ended her flying career in June 1968 and began to do administrative work in the Force. In 1984, she was discharged due to the state of her health. Melody received a Long Service award and The Efficiency Medal. However Ayele Kome now Ayele Essel-Ampah is still alive and lives in Alberta, Canada with her Family. Ayele was recently interviewed by a local radio station in her hometown of La.

== Life after active service ==
After she retired from the military, she worked for the World Food Programme for a brief period and then the National Service Secretariat. At the age of 60, she earned a Diploma in Bible Studies and Theology and began to preach to military audiences. She later joined the board of directors for the Ghana Institute of Management and Public Administration.

== Acknowledgements ==
Melody was honoured with The Companion of the Order of the Volta in 2006, by President John Kufuor for being a courageous pacesetter. She was mentioned by Mrs. Rebeca Akufo-Addo, the first lady of Ghana during the 2017 International Women's Day celebrations for being an inspiration to women. The "Melody" is an ultramodern building facility for the Psychiatry Department of the University of Ghana Medical School at Korle-Bu in Accra. It was named after her, as she experienced some level of depression both during and after her active service.
