= Burchard Joan Elias =

Last Governor-General of the Dutch West Indies (1799 – 1871)

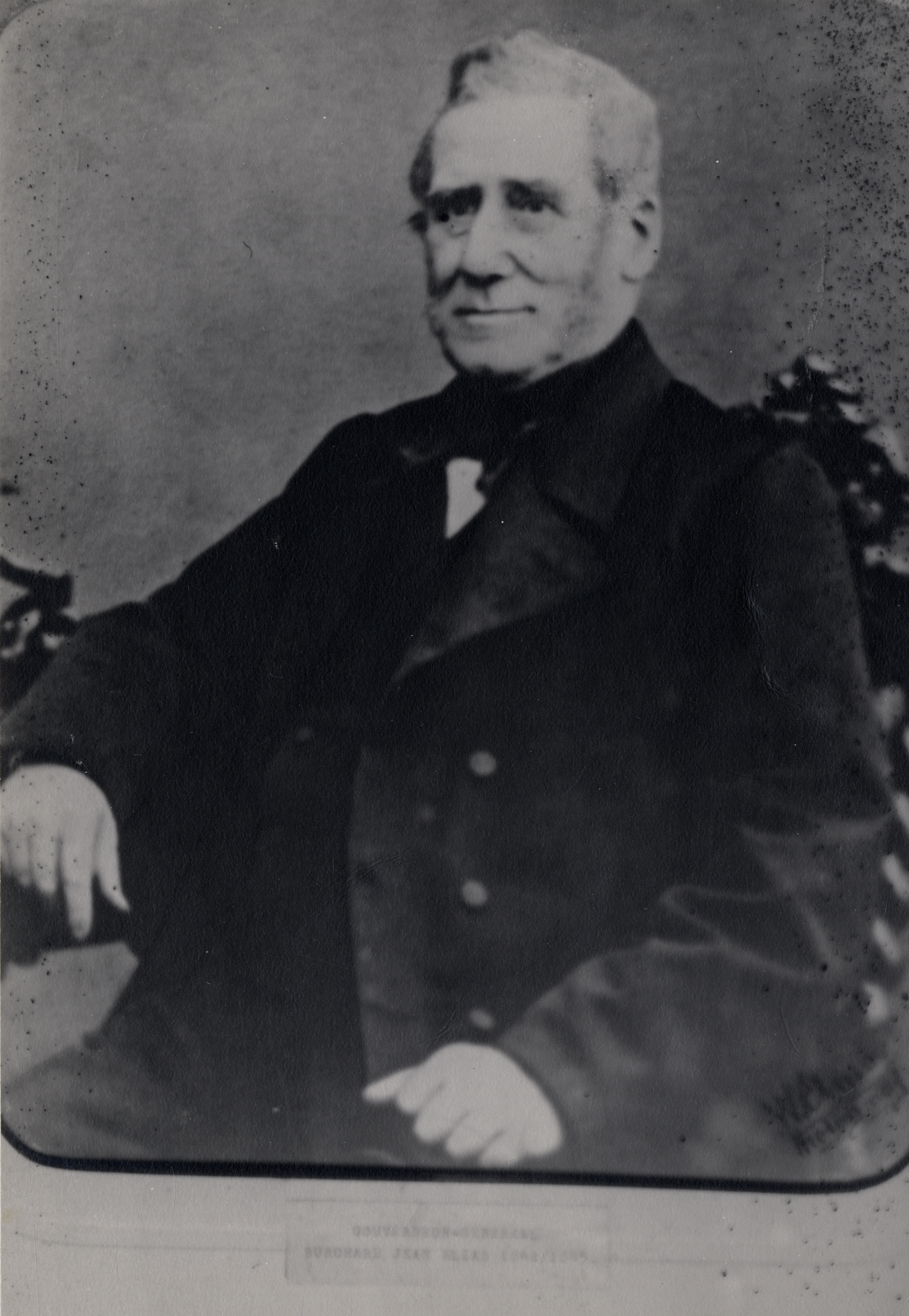

Governor of the Dutch West Indies
- In office 15 November 1842 – 16 July 1845
- Preceded by: Philippus de Kanter
- Succeeded by: Philippus de Kanter

Personal details
- Born: 12 July 1799 Amsterdam, Netherlands
- Died: 1 May 1871 (aged 71) The Hague, Netherlands
- Spouse(s): Cornelia Dorothea Adelheid Scholten van Aschat; Lidie Henriëtte Scholten van Aschat

Burchard Joan Elias (12 July 1799 – 1 May 1871) was the last Governor-General of the Dutch West Indies, a colony that existed between 1828 and 1845, as a merger of Surinam and Curaçao and Dependencies. After Elias left office, the colony was again, split. Before his governorship, Elias served as resident of Cirebon (1830–1838) and as Secretary-General at the Ministry of the Colonies (1838–1842).

== Biography ==
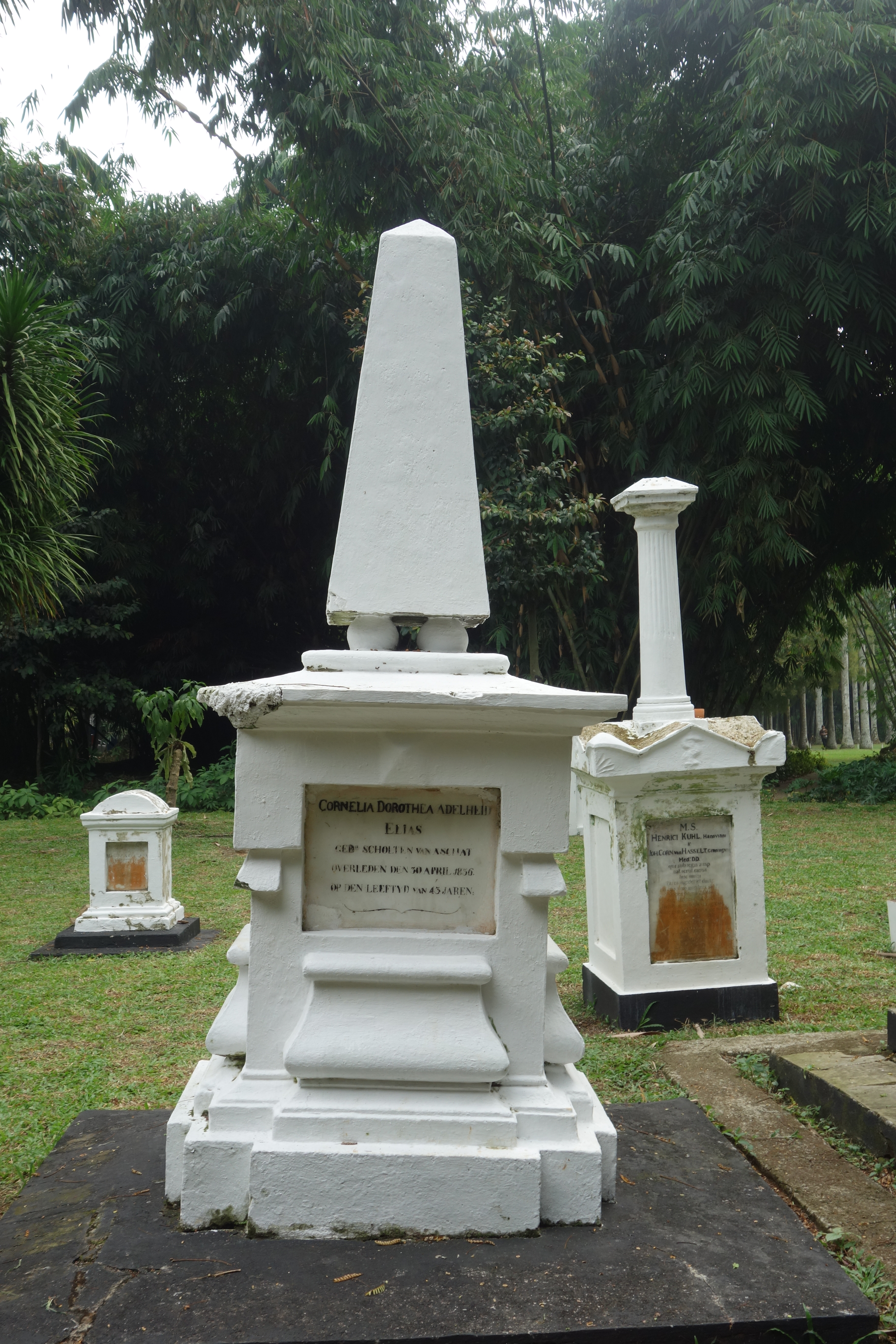
Grave of Cornelia Elias, first wife of Burchard Elias

Burchard Joan Elias was born in Amsterdam to Gerbrand Elias and Henriëtte Alexandrine Adélaïde von Deneken. In 1823, he married Cornelia Dorothea Adelheid Scholten van Aschat who died in 1836, and in 1837, he married her sister, Lidie Henriëtte Scholten van Aschat.

Burchard Joan Elias was the father of Henri Alexander Elias, who served as Governor of the Dutch Gold Coast.
