= Windy Ridge, Takoradi =

Windy Ridge
- Location in Ghana
- Coordinates: 4°54′30″N 1°45′37″W
- Country: Ghana
- Region: Western Region (Ghana)
- Time zone: GMT

Windy Ridge is a residential town in the Western region of Ghana. It shares a boundary with Takoradi the regional capital. The town under the Takoradi constituency of Ghana.

== Boundary ==
The town is bounded to the east and south and west by Takoradi and on the North by Effiakuma and east by Tanokrom, Takoradi
