= Tanokrom, Takoradi =

Tanokrom
- Location in Ghana
- Coordinates: 4°54′50″N 1°46′10″W
- Country: Ghana
- Region: Western Region (Ghana)

Tanokrom is a town in Ghana. It is located five kilometers from Takoradi the regional capital of the Western region of Ghana. It is a dormitory town and provides housing facilities for several families who work in and around Takoradi. A report by the United States Agency for International Development (USAID) in 2009 graded the town with having good drinking water and improved sanitation.
