= Henry van Hien =

Ghanaian merchant and politician (c. 1857–1928)

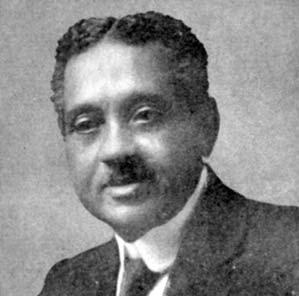

President of the National Congress of British West Africa

President of the Aborigines' Rights Protection Society
- Preceded by: J. E. Biney
- Succeeded by: Kobina Sekyi

Personal details
- Born: c. 1857 Elmina, Dutch Gold Coast
- Died: 4 July 1928
- Spouse: Marian Victoria Plange
- Parent(s): Carel Hendrik David van Hien and Elizabeth Essuman
- Relatives: Willem Essuman Pietersen (uncle)

Henry van Hien (c. 1857 – 4 July 1928) was a Gold Coast merchant, politician, and nationalist leader.

== Biography ==
=== Early life and business career ===
Henry van Hien was born in Elmina to Carel Hendrik David van Hien (1833–1864), a government official and Acting Governor of the Dutch Gold Coast, and Elizabeth Essuman (ca. 1839–1930), sister of Willem Essuman Pietersen. Henry was educated at the Cape Coast Government School and Mfantsipim School and, according to family tradition, went to the Netherlands and the United Kingdom for further education (this was not uncommon for the Euro-African elite in Cape Coast and Elmina). When he returned to the Gold Coast in 1878, he began working as an agent for F. & A. Swanzy at Shama, and later for Alexander Miller Bros. at Accra and Winneba. He was partner in the firm of his maternal uncle Willem Essuman Pietersen at Cape Coast, and managed it after his uncle's death in 1914. In his later years, van Hien was based in Accra.

=== Political career ===
In 1923, van Hien became a member of the Cape Coast Chamber of Commerce. A year later, he was installed as temporary unofficial member of the Gold Coast Legislative Council. From 1925 until 1927, he served as extraordinary member of the said Legislative Council, and later he served as member of the Cape Coast Town Council.

Van Hien served as President of the Aborigines' Rights Protection Society and was a founder of the National Congress of British West Africa, for which he also served as president.

=== Educationism ===
Van Hien actively promoted the establishment of educational institutions in Cape Coast. He was co-founder of Achimota College and founder of St. Monica's School.

== Personal life ==
Van Hien married Marian Victoria Plange. In his lifetime, he was both a member of the Wesleyan Methodist Church and Chancellor of the Anglican Church at Cape Coast. He was also a freemason.

Van Hien and Plange did not have any children. van Hien died on 4 July 1928 of cerebral haemorrhage and was buried in either the Sekondi Road Cemetery or the Anglican Cemetery in Cape Coast. His cousin Kobina Sekyi was his heir.
