= Women's Feature Service =

Indian women's news agency and magazine

- Founded: 1978
- Country: India
- Language: English
- Website: web.archive.org/web/20061202205736/http://www.wfsnews.org/

Women's Feature Service (WFS) is an Indian women's news agency and magazine, based in New Delhi, India. Established in 1978 by UNESCO, it deals with a wide range of feminist issues and social, economic, political, and health issues surrounding women and women in popular culture such as film and the arts. Women's Press Organizations, 1881-1999 describes the WFS as a "woman-managed global news agency that specializes in news feature stories about women and development, primarily in nations of the southern hemisphere." People & Planet says "This Delhi-based feature service provides news, features and opinions from a gender perspective, including items relating to women's reproductive health. Fresh updates from around the world every week. Women's Feature Service markets articles to print publications and websites."

The WFS also produces about 250-300 feature stories a year to major publications across the world including the Hindustan Times of India, Far Eastern Economic Review of Hong Kong, The Men's Zone of the Philippines, and the Chicago Tribune of the United States.
