= Grace Bediako =

Ghanaian statistician

- Born: Grace Bediako
- Education: Achimota School, University of Ghana, University of Pennsylvania
- Occupation: Statistician
- Awards: Order of the Volta; 2008

Grace Afua Bediako is a Ghanaian statistician and the former head of the Ghana Statistical Service. She was formerly a member of the National Development Planning Commission (NDPC).

== Education ==
Bediako had her secondary education at Achimota School, and earned her first degree in Economics and Statistics from the University of Ghana. She earned a PhD degree in Demography from the University of Pennsylvania. Prior to earning her doctorate degree in 1988, she acquired a diploma in Population Studies from the Regional Institute for Population Studies, Legon, as well as a Postgraduate Certificate in Survey Sampling from the University of Michigan.

== Career ==
Grace Bediako started her career as a government statistician. She was appointed to be the head of the Ghana Statistical Service, and served from June 2004 to June 2012. Prior to her career with the Government of Ghana, she was Chief of Demographic Statistics Section, United Nations Statistics Division from 2000 to 2004. She is currently the consultant to the National Development Planning Commission (NDPC) and also a board member for Savannah Accelerated Development Authority (SADA), Coastal Development Authority and a representative of the Internal Audit Agency serving as a member of the Audit Committee of the Ghana Science Association.

== Awards ==
Bediako received the President's award of the Order of the Volta for Public Service in 2008. She is also an elected member of the International Statistical Institute.

== Works and publications ==
Bediako compiled and published the Annual Economic Survey She is also responsible for the production of three major United Nations methodological reports: Handbook for Producing a National Statistical Reports on Women and Men, Technical Report on Collecting Economic Characteristics in Population and Housing Censuses, and Trial International Classification for Time-use Activities.

As a government statistician, she led numerous surveys, including the Ghana Living Standards Survey, 2005/06; Crime Victimization Survey, 2009; and National Population and Housing Census, 2010. She also formulated the five-year Ghana Statistics Development Plan, which sought to strengthen the institutional and human resource capacity of the different ministries, departments and agencies with linkages as well as sources of data for the compilation of national statistics.
