= Gold Coast Aborigines' Rights Protection Society =

African anti-colonialist organization

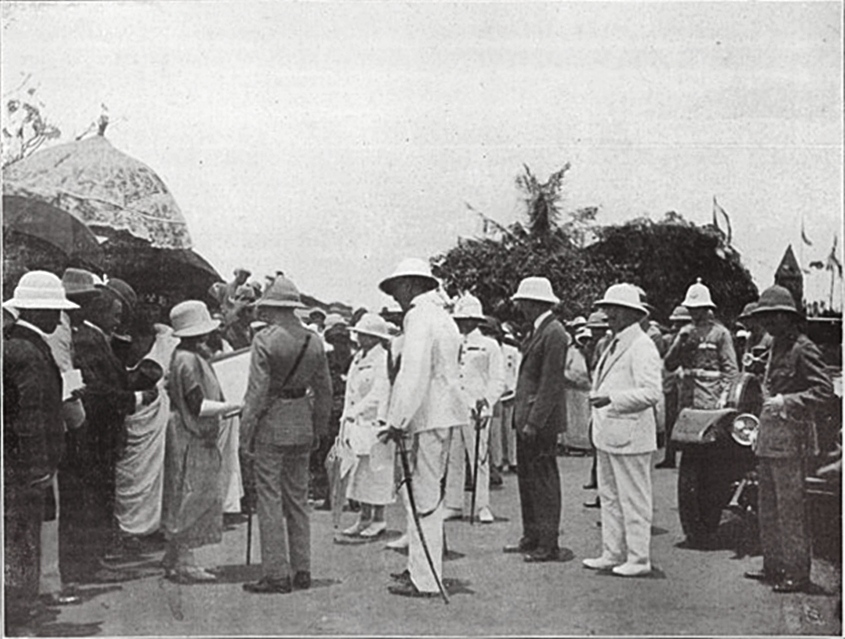
Miss Wood in Accra presenting the Address of the Gold Coast Aborigines' Rights Society to the Prince of Wales. Behind Miss Wood can be seen the James Town Manche, Mr. H. van HienVan Hien, and the Hon. Casely Hayford.

The Gold Coast Aborigines' Rights Protection Society (ARPS) was an African anti-colonialist organization formed in 1897 in the Gold Coast, as Ghana was then known. Originally established by traditional leaders and the educated elite to protest the Crown Lands Bill of 1896 and the Lands Bill of 1897, which threatened traditional land tenure, the Gold Coast ARPS became the main political organization that led organized and sustained opposition against the colonial government in the Gold Coast, laying the foundation for political action that would ultimately lead to Ghanaian independence. Its delegates were active in international organizations, and at the 1945 Pan-African Congress, it gained support from Kwame Nkrumah, who later became the main leader of the independence movement. However, the middle-class intellectuals who supported the Society broke with Nkrumah because they were less committed to a full-scale revolutionary effort. Consequently, the Society decreed as a major political force.

J. W. de Graft-Johnson, Jacob Wilson Sey, J. P. Brown, J. E. Casely Hayford, and John Mensah Sarbah were co-founders.

Notable members include Fred Dove, C.W. Betts, Dr. Sapara, Dr. Quartey-Papa, and Rotimi Alade.

== Foundation ==
The Gold Coast ARPS formed as a conglomerate of different groups of intellectuals in Cape Coast and Southern Ghana who sought to protect the traditional land tenure practices of the indigenous Gold Coast peoples from being usurped by the British colonial government. One of the initial goals of the Gold Coast ARPS was to ensure "…that every person may understand [the Lands Bill of 1897] the same". The Gold Coast ARPS became a voice for the rights of indigenous peoples by both broadcasting their aims in their own newspaper, Gold Coast Aborigines, and advocating on behalf of indigenous land rights by presenting the reasons for their dissent of the Lands Bill of 1897 in front of the Legislative Council.

Particularly, John Mensah Sarbah, a key member of the Gold Coast ARPS and a lawyer, helped to advocate against the introduction of the Lands Bill of 1897 by arguing that it was no different from a previous, unsuccessful bill in 1894; that its introduction would break family and society ties, and that the land was valuable to indigenous peoples for its religious significance. The Gold Coast ARPS then sent a delegation to London in order to advocate for the dismissal of the Lands Bill of 1897 in front of Joseph Chamberlain, the Secretary of State of Britain at the time. A notable aspect of the delegation is that it included not only members of the Gold Coast elite, but also "prominent merchants". It was through their meeting with Joseph Chamberlain that the Gold Coast ARPS was able to get support for the denunciation of the Lands Bill of 1897 and the assurance that "native law would remain and prevail with regard to devolution of land".

The Gold Coast ARPS eventually fell out of fashion in exchange for newer nationalist movements, such as the National Congress of British West Africa (NCBWA) in 1920.

=== Influences on the founding of the Gold Coast ARPS ===
The formation of the Gold Coast ARPS came at a period during the late 19th century in which the educated Gold Coast elite were systematically barred from high-ranking positions in the colonial government. It was this exclusion, in part, that fuelled both the "cultural nationalism" and "anti-colonial political activity" that led to the creation of the Gold Coast ARPS in 1897.

As part of the emergence of cultural nationalism during the late 19th century, members of the educated elite throughout the Western African region began to return to their traditional roots by either reclaiming their "original African names, when these could be discovered…" or "new African names when they could not". This reclamation of nomenclature influenced the naming of the "Gold Coast Aborigines' Rights Protection Society," as it was originally conceived as a branch of the Aborigines' Protection Society of London but later renamed so as to serve as its own unique entity with a direct connection to the African continent in general and the Gold Coast in particular.

=== Perception of aims of the Gold Coast ARPS ===
Entrenched in the founding of the Gold Coast ARPS was a belief that both the political actions of the Gold Coast ARPS and the movement against foreign encroachments on native lands were "joint vehicles of nationalism". Moreover, the key players in the Gold Coast ARPS predicated their belief in a movement against the Lands Bill of 1897 on the assumption that “the economic interests of the [village] chiefs were identical with those of the rural population as a whole.” This assumption was necessary in the cultivation of support for the opposition of the Lands Bill of 1897 because it fueled public support for a return to traditional forms of land tenure that had vested land ownership in the hands of rural peoples instead of in the hands of foreign actors. In the critiques of the Gold Coast ARPS’ nationalists aims, much of the skepticism about the true intentions of the members of the Gold Coast ARPS came from British colonial administrators who were dismissive of the attempts of the Gold Coast ARPS to oppose the Lands Bill of 1897. This is highlighted in controversy that suggests that despite the beliefs of the colonial administrators of the Gold Coast ARPS' self-interest in the protest movements, "there was overwhelming evidence of a long history of cooperation between the intellectuals and the indigenous political authorities, at least in Cape Coast."

== Legacy ==
=== Global interaction ===
==== Global salience of race ====
An analysis of the impact of the Gold Coast ARPS must typically be constrained to the society's impact on local politics in the Gold Coast region. However, the Gold Coast ARPS was interested not only in the protection of the rights of the native peoples in the Gold Coast but also with the larger global struggles of the African diaspora, including the United States, Europe and the West Indies. The Gold Coast ARPS's interest in the affairs of people of colour abroad was predicated on the notion of the salience of race beyond the confines of an African context and the global prevalence of racial discrimination. The connection of the Gold Coast ARPS with the global movements for freedom and rights for people of colour began with interactions between the leaders of Gold Coast ARPS and other anti-imperialist and pan-Africanist leaders abroad and ended with Gold Coast ARPS’ involvement with the 1945 Manchester Pan-African Congress.

==== Gold Coast ARPS activities abroad ====
The Gold Coast ARPS interest in global movements initially gained momentum as news of the success of various anti-colonial efforts reached the Gold Coast, particularly Japan's victory in the Russo-Japanese War and Ethiopia's victory in the First Italo-Ethiopian War. In addition to the news of successful anti-colonial movements, the Gold Coast ARPS was interested in the growing formation of pan-African conferences that sought to discuss "questions 'affecting the Native races'".

The Gold Coast ARPS was particularly interested in the Pan-African Conference that took place in July 1900 in London, the first conference of its kind to occur. The influence of this conference on the members of the Gold Coast ARPS was a renewed belief that, eventually, the indigenous African peoples would be able to successfully rise up against the European colonial powers that had ruled over them for centuries and begin to govern themselves. This interest in Pan-Africanism manifested itself in attempts by the Gold Coast ARPS to hold a similar conference on the Gold Coast, although the idea never came to fruition. Despite this inability to create their own pan-African conference, the Gold Coast ARPS in 1912 participated in a pan-African conference at what is now Tuskegee University.

==== Impact of international exposure ====
The impact of the Gold Coast ARPS' interaction with global pan-Africanist and anti-imperialist movements rested on the ability of these interactions to not only bring the grievances of the Gold Coast natives to the global stage but also to help the Gold Coast ARPS gain leverage with which to lobby the colonial government in Gold Coast to recognize the legitimacy of their cultural nationalist and political aims. Another consequence of the Gold Coast ARPS' interaction with other global movements was the attainment of knowledge about how successful African domination of colonial rule could take place. An idea of particular interest to the Gold Coast ARPS was the creation of trade among "all of us who are of African blood".

=== Criticism ===
A common critique of the Gold Coast ARPS was that its members sought to garner greater financial and political gain for the African bourgeoisie and elites, rather than for the common people. Part of this critique lay in a disjuncture between the espoused values of cultural nationalism by the Gold Coast ARPS that advocated a fight for the indigenous peoples given the connection that the Gold Coast ARPS had with the British colonial government. Specifically, many of the members of the Gold Coast ARPS had been educated abroad and were part of an African upper class that would take over the administration of the Gold Coast should the region be granted independence from colonial rule and thus hold similar power to that of the colonialists over their indigenous brethren. Moreover, in the attempts by the Gold Coast ARPS to engage globally with other anti-imperialist and pan-Africanist movements, the Gold Coast ARPS required large sums of money to fund their trips, which they often acquired by charging tribal heads of local communities disproportionate fees to become members of the Gold Coast ARPS. These criticisms of the desires and motives of the Gold Coast ARPS are strengthened by the outcome of the Native Administration Ordinance of 1927, which allowed chiefs of indigenous Gold Coast groups to have direct interaction with the colonial government. It was at the same time as the implementation of this ordinance that the Gold Coast Gold Coast ARPS began to lose some of their power, as they could no longer use the Gold Coast indigenous chiefs as leverage from which to gain funds. Some also critique members of the Gold Coast ARPS because many did not return to their ancestral African roots, despite their constant praise of a need to return to traditional African roots as a way to fully realize the cultural nationalist policies that they supported.

== Presidents ==
- Jacob Wilson Sey
- J. P. Brown
- J. E. Casely Hayford
- Willem Essuman Pietersen (c.1844-1914)
- J. E. Biney
- H. van Hien
- Kobina Sekyi

John Peter Allotey Hammond was the Secretary and later a member of the Coussey Committee.

Joseph William Egyanka Appiah (later Jemisimiham Jehu-Appiah) later became a member through Attoh Ahuma, and was part of the delegation that went to UK to protest to the Queen to release all Ghana lands into the hands of natives.
