= Henri Alexander Elias =

Dutch colonial administrator

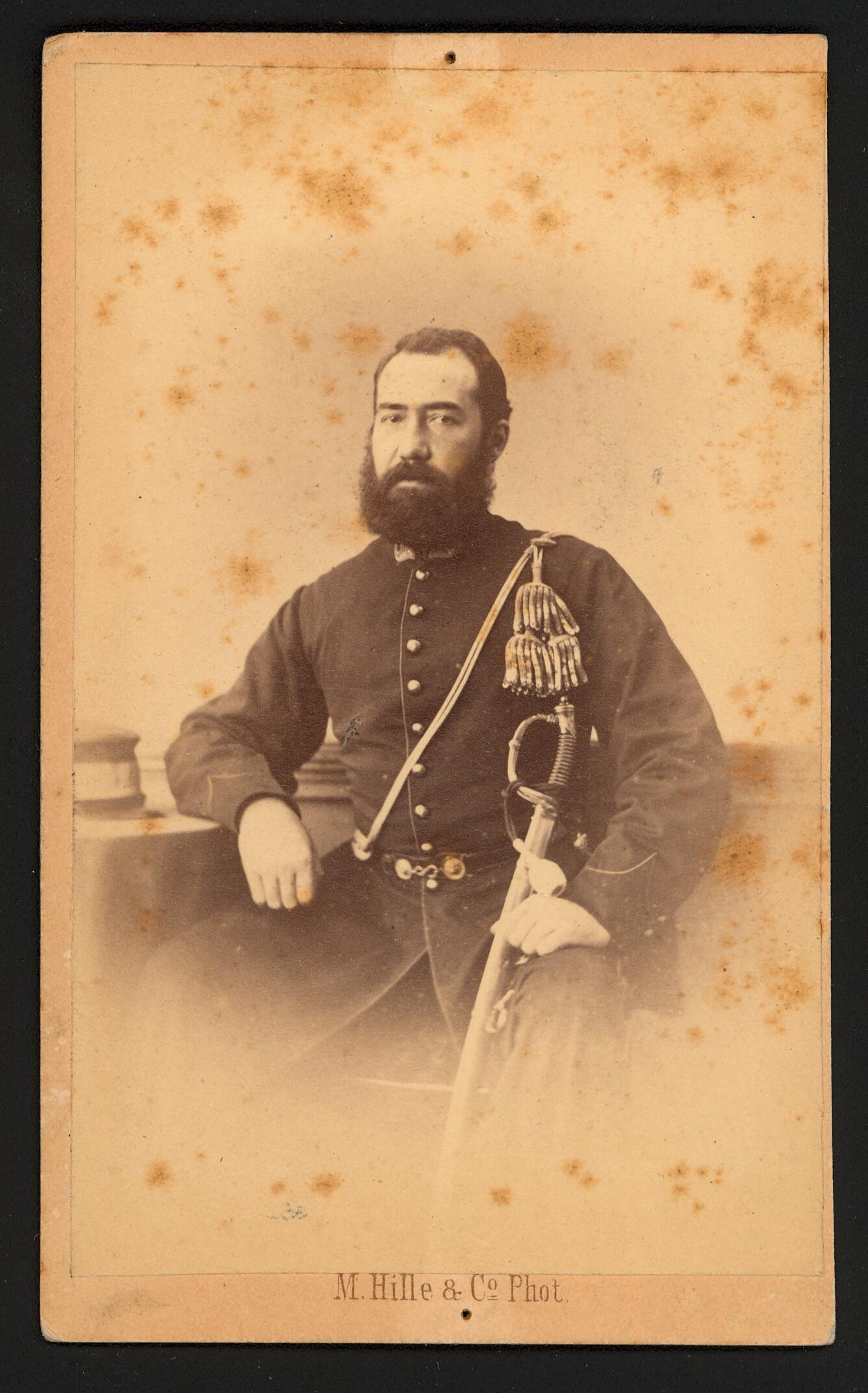

Governor of the Dutch Gold Coast
- In office 7 December 1864 – 4 May 1865
- Monarch: William III of the Netherlands
- Preceded by: Hendrik Doyer
- Succeeded by: Arend Magnin
- In office 18 October 1862 – 12 March 1864
- Monarch: William III of the Netherlands
- Preceded by: Cornelis Nagtglas
- Succeeded by: Carel Hendrik David van Hien

Personal details
- Born: 21 March 1829 Batavia, Dutch East Indies
- Died: 26 February 1903 (aged 73) The Hague, Netherlands
- Spouse: Jeannette Jacqueline Struycken Boudier

Henri Alexander Elias (born 21 March 1829 – 26 February 1903) was a Dutch colonial administrator, who served as governor of the Dutch Gold Coast.

== Biography ==
Henri Alexander Elias was born in Batavia, Dutch East Indies to Burchard Joan Elias, a civil servant in the colonial government of the Dutch East Indies who later became governor of the Dutch West Indies, and Cornelia Dorothea Adelheid Scholten van Aschat, a housemaid originally from Amsterdam. Both his parents stem from prominent Dutch patrician families.

Shortly after his mother died on 30 April 1836, Henri Alexander moved from the Dutch East Indies to the Netherlands, together with his father and his brother Burchard. Both Henri Alexander and his brother Burchard were enrolled at the private boarding school of Simon van Moock in Delft. One year later, the Ashanti princes Kwasi Boakye and Kwame Poku joined Henri Alexander and Burchard at this boarding school. The 1839 census of Delft indeed lists Henri Alexander, his brother Burchard, Kwasi Boakye and Kwame Poku as four of in total seventeen pupils resident at Oude Delft 480, where the boarding school was located.

Both Henri Alexander and his brother Burchard studied for some time at the University of Bonn, where they were members of the Corps Borussia Bonn student corps. Elias started a career of the Ministry of Colonies, where he was head of the West Indies department. By royal decree of 23 January 1862, Elias was appointed governor of the Dutch Gold Coast, with the titular rank of lieutenant colonel. He arrived in Elmina in October 1862. In 1864, he was on leave in Europe for most of the year. After returning to the Gold Coast on 7 December 1864, he left for the Netherlands again on 11 May 1865. Elias was honourably discharged.

After his return to Europe, the Dutch ambassador in London requested Elias' and Cornelis Nagtglas' advice on the Anglo-Dutch Convention for an Interchange of Territory on the Gold Coast of Africa that was being negotiated at the time. In this context, Elias and Nagtglas went to London in January 1867 to have an audience with Henry Herbert, 4th Earl of Carnarvon, the British Secretary of State for the Colonies.

There is no evidence of Elias resuming his career in the Netherlands. He seems to have retired in his late thirties.

== Personal life ==
Henri Elias married Jeannette Jacqueline Struycken Boudier on 26 November 1868.

== Decorations ==
- Order of the Netherlands Lion (Knight, 1865)

== In fiction ==
The fact that a future governor of the Dutch Gold Coast was a fellow pupil of Kwasi Boakye and Kwame Poku at the boarding school of Van Moock in Delft has inspired the Maastricht University law professor and former judge Fokke Fernhout to write a story in which the friendship between Kwame Poku and Henri Alexander is the reason for the latter to accept the position of governor of the Dutch Gold Coast. In Fernhout's story, which was published in De Gids of February 2006, Henri Alexander wanted to go to the Gold Coast to say goodbye to Kwame, who had committed suicide at Elmina Castle on 22 February 1850.
