= International Institute for Journalism =

International Institute for Journalism (IIJ, in German: Internationales Institut für Journalismus) is a Berlin-based institution offering professional training to journalists from the Third World and "developing" countries.

According to the IIJ's website, the institution has been offering advanced training for newspaper and agency journalists from "developing, transitional and newly industrialised" countries since 1964. Since 2011, the IIJ is a competence centre in the Deutsche Gesellschaft für Internationale Zusammenarbeit (GIZ).

The IIJ has a focus on following topics:

- Political and conflict sensitive reporting
- Economics and business journalism
- Climate change and environmental reporting
- Multimedia and online journalism
- Media ethics
- Media management.

It adds that the aim of the courses "is to strengthen the freedom of opinion and the freedom of the press in the partner countries and thus improve the conditions for democratisation and social and economic development."
