= Demographic Research =

- Discipline: Demography
- Language: English
- Edited by: Jakub Bijak

Publication details
- History: 1999–present
- Publisher: Max Planck Institute for Demographic Research
- Frequency: Monthly
- Impact factor: 1.320 (2016)

Standard abbreviations
- ISO 4: Demogr. Res.

Indexing
- ISSN: 1435-9871 (print); 2363-7064 (web)

Links
- Journal homepage

Demographic Research is a peer-reviewed, open access academic journal covering demography. It was established in 1999 and is published by Max Planck Institute for Demographic Research. The editor-in-chief is Jakub Bijak (University of Southampton). Tyler Myroniuk (University of Kansas) has served as an associate editor since 2022. According to the Journal Citation Reports, the journal has a 2016 impact factor of 1.320.
