= Mfantsipim School =

All-boys boarding secondary school in Cape Coast, Ghana

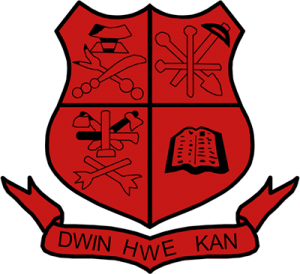

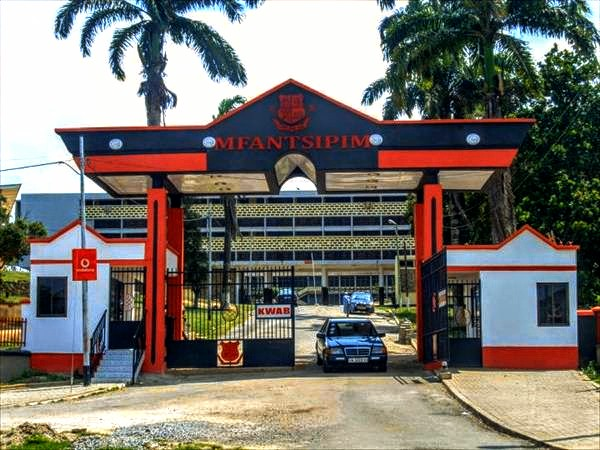

Location
- Aboom Wells Road; Cape Coast; Central Region; Cape Coast, 101; Ghana; 5.119°N 1.251°W

Information
- School type: Public secondary/high school mission
- Motto: Dwen Hwɛ Kan ( (Think and Look Ahead))
- Religious affiliation: Christian
- Denomination: Methodist
- Established: 3 April 1876; 150 years ago
- Sister school: Wesley Girls High School
- School district: Cape Coast
- Category: A
- Headmaster: Very Rev. Ebenezer K. Aidoo
- Chaplain: Rev. Samuel
- Staff: 147+ teachers
- Gender: Boys
- Age: 16 to 20
- Enrollment: 2500+
- Average class size: 55
- Language: English
- Houses: 8
- Colours: Crimson and black
- Song: "For all the Saints" (MHB 832)
- Sports: Basketball Football Hockey Track and field etc.
- Nickname: Kwabotwe
- Rivals: Adisadel College; St. Augustine's College
- Yearbook: Botaepa
- Affiliation: Methodist Church, Ghana
- Alumni: Mfantsipim Old Boys Association (MOBA)
- School anthem: "Dwen Hwɛ Kan"

Mfantsipim School is an all-boys day and boarding secondary school in Cape Coast, Ghana, established by the Methodist Church in 1876 to foster intellectual, moral, and spiritual growth in the then Gold Coast. Its founding name was Wesleyan High School, and the first headmaster was James Picot, a French scholar, who was only 17 years old on his appointment.

Mfantsipim is nicknamed The School because it is recognised as the first and oldest senior high school in Gold Coast (Ghana) and it gave birth to other prominent schools such as Prempeh College.

== History ==
The idea of establishing a collegiate school to raise educational standards in the [(central region) |Gold Coast] was first mooted in 1865 but was not realized until 1876 when the Wesleyan High School was established in Cape Coast with donations from local businessmen and the support of the Methodist Missionary Society in London. The school was originally intended to be situated in Accra, owing to a decision by the British Government to move the capital of the Gold Coast from Cape Coast to Accra by 1870. However, due to local agitation and the urgency to implement the idea, it was finally established in Cape Coast, although there were initial plans to later move it to Accra, a relocation that never happened.

On 3 April 1876, the school was established as Wesleyan High School.

=== Foundation and Early Development ===
Mfantsipim School was established in 1876 as Wesleyan High School in Cape Coast, primarily to train teachers with an initial enrollment of 17 pupils. The idea of establishing a collegiate school in the Gold Coast dates back to 1865, but it took eleven years to realize this vision. The school's location was chosen amidst local agitation and the urgent need to start the institution, despite initial plans to establish it in Accra.

The first headmaster was James Picot, a young French scholar, who was only 17 years old at his appointment. Despite his youth and relatively limited experience, Picot played a crucial role in the school's early days.

=== Name change and evolution ===
In 1905 a graduate of the school, John Mensah Sarbah, founded a rival school named Mfantsipim; the name derives from "Mfantsefo-apem", literally meaning "thousands of Fantes" but actually meaning "the gathering of hosts of scholars for change" originally by the Fantes. In July of the same year, the two schools were merged under the supervision of the Methodist Church, keeping the name Mfantsipim.

=== Historical relocation and expansion ===
Originally built on the premises of the Cape Coast Castle, Mfantsipim was later moved to its current location on Kwabotwe Hill in northern Cape Coast in 1930. This move marked a significant phase in the school's expansion and development.

== Academic and cultural traditions ==
The school celebrates annual events such as the Speech and Prize Giving Day, which dates back to 1908, initiated by Rev. W. T. Balmer. The school anthem, Botae Pa, sung at various events, encapsulates the school's history, values, and aspirations.

=== National Science and Maths Quiz 2025 ===
Mfantsipim School in Cape Coast, popularly known as Kwabotwe or simply Botwe, gallantly defended its title when it beat St. Augustine's College, Cape Coast, and Opoku Ware School, Kumasi, at the grand finale of National Science and Mathematics Quiz (NSMQ) 2025 held in Cape Coast. At the end of the fiercely contested final, Mfantsipim School lifted the trophy for the second consecutive time with 56 points, while St. Augustine's College followed in second place with 42 points and Opoku Ware School had 29 points to place third.

== Notable alumni ==
- Ernest Addison, former governor of the Bank of Ghana
- Paa Kwesi Amissah-Arthur, former vice president of the Republic of Ghana
- Kofi Annan, Nobel Peace Prize laureate and former Secretary-General of the United Nations
- Kow Nkensen Arkaah, former vice president of the Republic of Ghana
- Raphael Armattoe, scientist, nationalist, writer
- Albert Adu Boahen, academic, historian and politician
- Kofi Abrefa Busia, political leader, academic and Prime Minister of Ghana (1969–1972)
- Mohamed Ibn Chambas, former president of ECOWAS commission
- Joseph W.S. de Graft-Johnson, former vice president of the Republic of Ghana
- Joe de Graft, writer, playwright and dramatist; first director of the Ghana Drama Studio
- J. E. Casely Hayford, journalist and politician
- Kobina Arku Korsah, first chief justice of Ghana
- John Mensah Sarbah, diplomat, prominent lawyer and political leader in the Gold Coast (now Ghana)
- Nana Kobina Nketsia V, Paramount Chief (Omanhen) of the Essikado (British Sekondi) Traditional Area in the Western Region of Ghana
- Alex Quaison-Sackey, diplomat, first black president of the UN General Assembly
- Kobina Sekyi, lawyer, writer, nationalist
- Tsatsu Tsikata, academic and lawyer
- Arthur Wharton, England's first black professional footballer
- Prof. Kwasi Kwafo Adarkwa, former vice chancellor of KNUST

== Awards ==
- Winners of the 1999, 2014, 2024 and 2025 editions of the National Science and Maths Quiz
- Winners of the 2024 edition of the National Science and Maths Quiz
- Winner of the 2021 of National Public Speaking competitions
- Six-time Sprite basketball champions

== Gallery ==
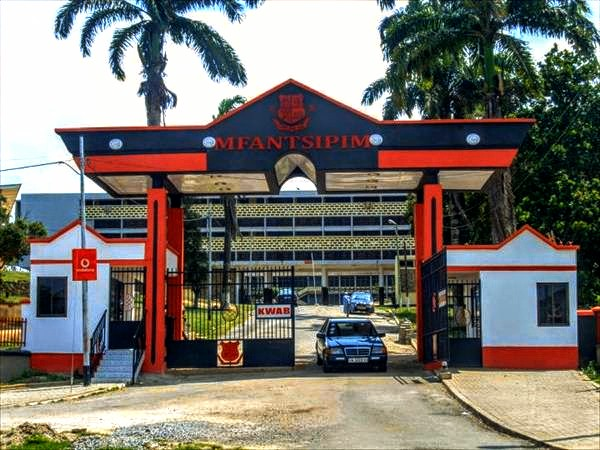
Main Entrance

Mfantsipim School Choir

Admin Block 2

Mfantsipim School Bus
