= List of Mfantsipim School alumni =

This is a list of notable alumni of Mfantsipim School.

== Politics ==
- Kobina Sekyi - President, Aborigines' Rights Protection Society (ARPS), lawyer, writer, author of The Blinkards
- Kofi Abrefa Busia - Prime Minister of Ghana
- William Ofori Atta - Member of "The Big Six"
- Joseph W.S. de-Graft Johnson - Vice President of Ghana (1979–1981)
- John C. de-Graft Johnson - Ambassador in The Hague (1967–1970)
- Kow Nkensen Arkaah - Vice President of Ghana (1992–1996)
- Kwesi Amissah-Arthur - Vice President of Ghana (2012–2017)
- Albert Adu Boahen - first presidential candidate of the New Patriotic Party (NPP). Flagbearer in the 1992 general election
- Joseph Ephraim Casely-Hayford - lawyer and politician and member of Fante Confederacy and Aborigines' Rights Protection Society
- Alexander Ransford Ababio - Minister in the PNDC regime
- Papa Owusu-Ankomah - former MP for Sekondi (7 January 1997 – 6 January 2017), and Minister of State (2001–2008).
- Samuel Atta Mills - Member of parliament for the Komenda-Edina-Eguafo-Abirem Constituency (2017–)
- Kwabena Agyapong - politician, former General Secretary of the NPP
- Boakye Agyarko - former Minister for Energy, Ghana
- George Emmanuel Kwesi Aikins - former Attorney General of Ghana
- Kwabena Kwakye Anti - Minister in the second republic
- Joe Appiah - politician
- Albert Bosomtwi-Sam - MP for Sekondi (1992 to 1996)
- Francis Yao Asare - Minister in the first republic
- Kwaku Boateng - minister in the first republic
- T. D. Brodie-Mends - minister in the second republic
- Archie Casely-Hayford - lawyer and politician
- Isaac Chinebuah - academic and politician
- Alexander Apeatu Aboagye da Costa - deputy minister in the Busia government
- Alfred Jonas Dowuona-Hammond - Minister in the first republic
- Kwaku Baah - Deputy Minister in the Busia government
- Kwamena Bartels - Minister of state in the Kufuor government
- Justice Akuamoa Boateng - deputy minister in the Busia government
- Kwamena Duncan - Central Regional Minister, Akufo-Addo government
- John Kofi Fynn - Deputy Minister in the Busia government
- Ashford Emmanuel Inkumsah - minister in the first republic
- J. Kwesi Lamptey - minister in the second republic
- Kofi Asante Ofori-Atta - politician, former Speaker of the Parliament of Ghana
- J. V. L. Phillips - Minister in the NLC regime
- Augustus Obuadum Tanoh - founding member of the National Democratic Congress, founder of the National Reform Party and presidential candidate in the 2000 Ghanaian general election
- Emmanuel Gyekye Tanoh - Minister of state in the PNDC regime

=== Traditional rulers ===
- Nana Kobina Nketsia V - Paramount Chief of Essikado Traditional Area

=== Ghanaian MPs ===
- Joe Ghartey - lawyer, MP for Ketan-Essikado, Minister of Railways
- Edwin Nii Lante Vanderpuye - journalist, MP for Odododiodio
- Anthony Seibu Alec Abban - MP for Ajumako-Asikuma and later Ajumako during the first republic
- Swinthin Maxwell Arko - MP for Agona Nsaba during the first republic
- Dr. Henry Satorius Bannerman - MP for Ashiedu Keteke during the second republic
- Kwabena Okyere Darko-Mensah - MP for Takoradi, Deputy minister
- Kobina Hagan - MP for Denkyira during the first republic
- James Gyakye Quayson - MP for Assin North (elected in 2020 and re-elected in 2023 through a bye-election)

== Diplomats ==
- Kofi Annan - former UN Secretary General
- Mohamed Ibn Chambas - former MP and diplomat
- J. L. S. Abbey - former diplomat
- James Aggrey-Orleans - former Ghanaian envoy to the UK
- Francis Lodowic Bartels - former diplomat
- Ebenezer Moses Debrah - former diplomat
- Patrick R. D. Hayford - former diplomat, Ghana's Ambassador to South Africa (1997–1999)
- Alex Quaison-Sackey - first black president of the UN General Assembly
- Nana Effah-Apenteng - former permanent representative of Ghana to the United Nations
- William George Mensah Brandful - retired diplomat
- Papa Owusu-Ankomah, diplomat, 2017 to date
- Miguel Augustus Francisco Ribeiro - former diplomat
- Eric Kwamina Otoo, former diplomat

== Public service ==
- John Henry Martey Newman - Chief of staff of John Evans Atta Mills administration
- Benjamin Asante - CEO, Ghana National Gas Company

== Academics ==
- James Emman Kwegyir Aggrey - Co-Founder of Achimota School
- R. P. Baffour - first Vice Chancellor of KNUST
- Isaiah Blankson - Ghanaian academic and scientist at NASA Glenn Research Center
- Kwame Bediako - first Rector of the Akrofi-Christaller Institute
- Kwasi Kwarfo Adarkwa - former Vice Chancellor of KNUST
- Daniel Afedzi Akyeampong - Ghanaian mathematician pioneer
- Joseph Wilfred Abruquah - novelist, former headmaster of Mfantsipim School and Keta Senior High Technical School
- Samuel Otu Gyandoh - Emeritus Professor of Law
- Kwame Gyekye -Philosopher
- Ato Sekyi-Otu - Academic, Writer, Political philosopher

== Business, banking and finance ==
- Ernest Addison - former Governor of the Bank of Ghana
- Kwesi Amissah-Arthur - former Governor of Bank of Ghana
- G. K. Agama - former Governor of Bank of Ghana

== Law ==
- Emmanuel Akwei Addo – Former Judge of the Court of Appeal; former member of International Law Commission of the United Nations
- George Emmanuel Kwesi Aikins – former Justice of the Supreme Court of Ghana and Attorney General of Ghana
- Kwadwo Agyei Agyapong – one of the three High Court judges that were abducted and murdered on June 30, 1982.
- Isaac K. Amuah – Justice of the Supreme Court of Ghana (1995–1997)
- Edward Amoako Asante – Justice of the Supreme Court of Ghana (2026–)
- Ebo Barton-Odro – MP for Cape Coast (2008-2016), Deputy Attorney-General, and First Deputy Speaker of the Parliament of Ghana
- Kobina Arku Korsah – first Ghanaian Chief Justice of Ghana
- Edmund Alexander Lanquaye Bannerman – 4th Chief Justice of Ghana
- Isaac Kobina Abban – 9th Chief Justice of Ghana and former Chief Justice of Seychelles
- Benjamin Teiko Aryeetey – Justice of the Supreme Court of Ghana (2009–2011)
- Theodore Kwami Adzoe – Justice of the Supreme Court of Ghana (2000–2008)
- William Bruce-Lyle – Supreme Court Judge of Ghana and Zambia
- John Mensah Sarbah – lawyer and academic
- Kurankyi-Taylor
- Anthony Forson Jnr. – Justice of the Supreme Court of Ghana (2026–)
- Joe Ghartey – former Attorney General of Ghana
- J. E. Casely Hayford – lawyer and academician
- William Bedford Van Lare – former justice of the Supreme Court of Ghana
- Samuel Okai Quashie-Idun – former puisne judge of the Supreme Court of Ghana, former Chief Justice of the High Court of Western Nigeria and former President of the Court of Appeal for Eastern Africa
- Papa Owusu-Ankomah – Attorney General of Ghana (2003–2004)
- Emmanuel Gyekye Tanoh – Attorney General of Ghana (1988–1993)
- Tsatsu Tsikata – lawyer and academic
- Isaac Wuaku – retired justice of the Supreme Court of Ghana

== Military and law enforcement ==
- Matthew Quashie - former Chief of Defence Staff of the Ghana Armed Forces
- Erasmus Ransford Tawiah Madjitey - first Ghanaian Commissioner of the Ghana Police Service

== Medicine ==
- Oku Ampofo - medical practitioner and sculptor
- Raphael Armattoe - medical researcher and Nobel Peace Prize Nominee in 1949
- Henry Satorius Bannerman - Formerly president of the Ghana Medical Association and the Commonwealth Medical Association
- David Ofori-Adjei - professor of Clinical Pharmacology
- Harold H. Phillips - formerly Dean of the University of Ghana Medical School

== Journalism ==
- Berifi Afari Apenteng - Director General of the Ghana Broadcasting Corporation (2011–2013)
- Anis Haffar - educationist, teacher, columnist and author
- Edwin Nii Lante Vanderpuye - journalist, MP for Ododiodio, former Minister of Sports

== Entrepreneurs ==
- Kofi Amoa-Abban - Founder of Rigworld
- Herman Chinery-Hesse - Founder of SOFTtribe, the largest software company in Ghana
- Isaac Sesi - Entrepreneur, Engineer, and Founder of Sesi Technologies
- Edward Annan - Co-owner and Co-founder of Ghanaian domestic airline, Passion Air and Founder of Masai Motors Limited
- Abe Ankumah - Entrepreneur and Co-founder of Nyansa an early AI startup

== Arts and entertainment ==
- Van Vicker - actor
- Majid Michel - actor
- Michael Dei-Anang - playwright, poet and novelist
- Kweku Elliot - actor
- Nii Kwate Owoo - filmmaker
- Joe de Graft - playwright
- Brew Riverson Jnr - actor
- Aaron Adatsi - actor

== Religion ==
- Kwame Bediako - Christian theologian
- Michael A. Bossman
- Kwesi Dickson

== Athletics and sports ==
- Derek Boateng - former black stars player
- Arthur Wharton- first black professional footballer in the world
- Kweku Eyiah - lawyer and football administrator
- Aziz Zakari - former Ghana sprinter
- Aziz Mohammed ~ Ghanaian athlete, sprinter
- Samuel Owusu~ Basketball player who merges the MVP at Spriteball 2019 and 2024 Africa Basketball festival.

== See also ==
- Mfantsipim Old Boys Association, an organization comprising alumni of Mfantsipim School
