= Center for Media, Religion and Culture =

The Center for Media, Religion, and Culture is a research center in the University of Colorado's College of Media, Communication and Information, that aims at cultivating knowledge and promoting research on the representation and interpretation of religion in popular media, both inside and outside the U.S. The center was founded in 2006 by Professor Stewart M. Hoover, a Journalism and Mass Communication faculty known for his work on popular media and religions. In addition to hosting several international conferences that address current issues in media, religion and culture, the center offers fellowship programs for domestic and international scholars interested in conducting research on related subjects. The Center takes on various projects with research fellows to explore religion and media from varied angles and through new, developing theoretical frameworks. The Center aims to bring together scholars, professionals and the larger public to explore the variety of ways media and religion influence one another and our daily lives. The Center currently works on several projects including one on the "Third Spaces" of Religion and Media, as well as a project in conjunction with the University of Haifa on Media Ambivalence. The Center also produces a radio show and has a group research blog.

== History ==
The idea to establish a center for media, religion and culture was introduced by Paul S. Voakes in 2003 when the dean saw Hoover’s success in attracting support from the Lilly Endowment, Inc to conduct research on media and religion. What started as a research collaboration between Hoover, his graduate students and his colleagues in Europe began to develop into something bigger.

In November 2004 Hoover with the assistance of Lynn Schofield Clark wrote a proposal for the establishment of the center. They identified project areas that later became the center's foci. Research works remained to be the foundational activity for the center. In addition, the center seeks support for Senior, Faculty and Post-Doctoral Fellowship Program that help shape ongoing research and scholarly projects in the field of media, religion and culture. The center also hold lectures, seminars and formal conferences both independently and in cooperation with other institutions such as New York University and the University of Southern California in an effort to bridge the academy with religious communities, industries and the wider public. Furthermore, it acts as the global secretariat for the International Conferences on Media, Religion and Culture that started in Uppsala, Sweden, in 1994 and it has become the prominent conference in the field.

The Center was officially inaugurated in 2006. During the same year, Clark left University of Colorado at Boulder and subsequently the Center to become Assistant Professor at the School of Communication at University of Denver. She remains a close collaborator of the Center and maintains a good relationship with Hoover. In 2007 Journalism and Mass Communication hired a new Assistant Professor, Nabil Echchaibi, who specializes in identity politics among young Muslim in the Arab world and in diaspora. He is now the associate director of the Center.

== Activities ==
=== Research Projects ===
Some of the projects mentioned below took place prior to the establishment of the Center, but closely associated with its development and continuation.

Finding Religion in the Media, 2010 - Present The Center for Media, Religion and Culture is currently undertaking a study funded by the Ford Foundation on the ways religion is represented, experienced, and understood through the media today. The project, entitled “Finding Religion in the Media,” explores the extent to which religious belief, practice, and action—particularly that directed at social reform and social change—can be generated in and through the media sphere.

The “third spaces” concept has been central to the Finding Religion in the Media project. As developed by Hoover and Echchaibi, this concept serves as an interpretive tool to highlight what we call a “thickening” of the religious experience beyond dichotomous definitions of both religion and media categories. Digital spaces have opened up opportunities to theorize the production of meaning across hybrid spaces. Digital media reflect and narrativize life experiences and the Center has done so by looking specifically at case studies of the way religion and the religious is articulated and contested online. The research is framed around the novelty of technologies that leads us to adopt a hierarchical indexing of what constitutes an authentic experience of belonging and belief, outside of dichotomies of traditional/modern, physical/digital, and real/proximal embodied experience. The impulse to define how and why we communicate, drawing boundaries between various technological media leads to problematic understandings of complex user identities. The third spaces concept argues that theories of ritual, religion, media and communication benefit from an analysis of how meaning is produced and performed at the borderlines of a complex ecosystem of media ensembles and hybrid spaces.

Muslims in the Mountain West, 2009-2010 This research, supported by a grant from the Social Sciences Research Council, is a joint project of the Center and the University of Colorado’s Center for Asian Studies. It is intended to develop a profile of Muslims and of Islam in the six states of the mountain west. Interviews and site visits will document the life, interests and culture of this growing community. The outcome will be information useful to media, scholars, and interested members of the public, and products including a website, a documentary film, and various resources and materials. The grant also supports a series of round table conversations and informational events bringing together scholars of Islam, members of the media, and representatives of the Muslim community. The project also fed into the Center’s conference on Islam and the Media.

Symbolism, Media, and the Lifecourse, 1996-2001 Principal Investigator (P.I.): Stewart Hoover; Associate P.I: Lynn Schofield Clark; Research Associates: Diane F. Alters, Joseph G. Champ, Lee Hood, and Henrik Boes. The project resulted in the book Media, Home, and Family (Routledge, 2004) written in collaboration by Hoover, Clark and Alters. The book argued that how families discuss the rules and practices surrounding media use are an important part of how they lay claim to a family identity in the age of reflexive parenting. The Symbolism project also provided the initial research for Hoover's, Religion in the Media Age (Routledge, 2006), Clark's From Angels to Aliens: Teenagers, the Media, and the Supernatural (Oxford U Press, 2003), and supported the development of the edited volume Practicing Religion in the Age of the Media, edited by Hoover and Clark (Columbia U Press, 2002).

Symbolism, Meaning, & the New Media @ Home, 2001-2006 P.I: Stewart Hoover; Associate P.I and Director for Teens and the New Media @ Home: Lynn Schofield Clark; Research Associates: Scott Webber, Christof Demont-Heinrich, Joe Champ, Michele Miles, AnnaMaria Russo, Denice Walker, Monica Emerich, Yuri Obata, Jin Park, and Kati Lustyik. This project provided the funding that supported the completion of Clark's book, From Angels to Aliens: Teenagers, the Media, and the Supernatural (Oxford U Press, 2003/2005 paperback). It also supported the conclusion of Hoover's Religion in the Media Age (Routledge, 2006) and the early research stage of Clark's Parenting in a Digital Age (forthcoming). Moreover, it provided support for the collaborative effort Hoover and Clark engaged in with the Pew Internet & American Life Project to produce the 2004 report, Faith Online.

Dissertation Fellowship Program in Media, Religion and Culture, 2002-2007 Co-Directors: Stewart Hoover and Lynn Schofield Clark; Fellowship Coordinators: Diane Alters, Scott Webber, Monica Emerich. This fellowship program has resulted in two edited volumes: Religion, Media, and the Marketplace (Rutgers University Press, 2007)

Media, Meaning and Work, 2006-2010 This research project covers two topics: Men, Masculinity, & Civic Engagement with Stewart Hoover as the P.I., and Youth and Civic Engagement with Lynn Schofield Clark as the P.I. The second project is sub-contracted to the University of Denver. This project provided the funding for the book Hoover is currently writing with his former graduate student at what was previously known as SJMC, Curtis Coats.

=== Conferences ===
The Center for Media, Religion and Culture hosts biannual conferences taking on important messages in relation to the subject of Media and Religion. The following are the conferences held at the University of Colorado at Boulder.

Media and Religion: The Global View (January 2014) The Center’s conference: Media and Religion: The Global View was held at the University of Colorado Boulder on January 9-12, 2014. The conference was designed to explore religion in the 21st century as it relates to media and its global applications and implications. This conference brought together an interdisciplinary community of scholars for focused conversations on emerging issues in media and religion. Each has proven to be an important landmark in the development of theory and method in its respective area and has resulted in important collaborations, publications, and resources for further research and dialogue. Invited speakers included: Pradip Thomas, University of Queensland, Australia; Magali do Nascimento Cunha, Universidade Metodista de São Paulo, Brazil; J. Kwabena Asamoah-Gyadu, Trinity Theological Seminary, Legon, Ghana; and Jane Little, Religious Affairs Correspondent at the BBC World Service and Religion Editor at Public Radio International’s The World.

International Conference on Digital Religion (January 2012) Digital Religion was held at the University of Colorado at Boulder on January 12-15, 2012. The conference brought together scholars of media and religion and producers of digital religion content from a variety of religious traditions to reflect on the implications of new media on religious practice and meaning-making in modern society. Invited speakers included: Stig Hjarvard, Department of Film & Media Studies at the University of Copenhagen, Jeremy Stolow, Department of Communication Studies at Concordia University, Montréal, and Heidi Campbell, Department of Communication at Texas A&M University.

Islam and The Media (January 2010) Co-Directors: Nabil Echchaibi and Stewart Hoover.

The conference engaged a range of questions on the place of Islam within global, regional, national and local media. It was attended by scholars on Islam and contemporary media, media professionals, activists, and members of NGOs. Featured speakers and presenters included Charles Hirschkind, Professor of Social Cultural Anthropology at University of California at Berkeley, Zarqa Nawaz, Creator of Little Mosque on the Prairie, a Canadian Broadcasting Corporation sitcom that chronicles the life of a small Muslim community in a prairie town in Saskatchewan, and Mona Eltahawy, an award-winning syndicated columnist and an international public speaker on Arab and Muslim issues who is based in New York.

=== ISMRC Conferences ===
International Society for Media, Religion and Culture Conference, 2014; Canterbury, England

In August 2014 the CMRC in association with the International Society for Media, Religion and Culture (ISMRC) held a conference hosted by Dr. Gordon Lynch from the University of Kent. This conference was held in Canterbury, England.
