= Paul Boafo =

Ghanaian academic and minister

The Most Rev. Dr. Paul Kwabena Boafo
- Born: 10 September 1957 (age 69); Asankragua, Ghana

Academic background
- Education: Wesley College, Kumasi; Trinity Theological Seminary, Legon (Dipl.-Theol.); University of Ghana, Legon (B.A.); Queen's University Belfast, (MTh, PhD)

Academic work
- Discipline: Christian theology
- Institutions: Trinity Theological Seminary, Legon; Methodist University College Ghana; Kwame Nkrumah University of Science and Technology

Ecclesiastical career
- Church: Methodist Church Ghana
- Offices held: 12th Presiding Bishop, Methodist Church Ghana (2018 – 2024)

Paul Kwabena Boafo (born 10 September 1957) is a Ghanaian theologian and minister who served as the twelfth Presiding Bishop of the Methodist Church Ghana from 2018 to 2024. He previously served as the Administrative Bishop of the Church. He is the first ordained minister to serve in both capacities in the episcopal history of the Ghanaian Methodist Church. Boafo also served as the Protestant Chaplain of the Kwame Nkrumah University of Science and Technology (KNUST). He is also the Chancellor of Methodist University Ghana.

== Early life and education ==
An ethnic Fante, Paul Kwabena Boafo was born in Asankragua in the Western Region of Ghana to Roman Catholic parents Opanin Paul Kwaw Boafo and Agatha Ama Asamoah Boafo. His mother described him as a sickly child and, by the age of three, he was a frequent patient at the local Catholic hospital.

In 1963, Boafo enrolled as a pupil at the Asankrangwa Roman Catholic Primary School. After his first year in elementary school, he moved to live with his maternal uncle, Reverend John Bennet Nsowah Quasie, then a catechist of the Methodist Church at Ankonsia, near Bawdie in the Western Region. Boafo's uncle was posted to Wa in the Upper West Region after completing his catechist training at the Freeman College in Kumasi.

Boafo then went to the Wa Experimental Primary School and later transferred to other schools in Mangu, Kenyasi, Sefwi Wiawso, and Sefwi-Bekwai due to his uncle's work as a travelling minister. After passing the common entrance examination at the Sefwi Bekwai Methodist Middle School, Boafo was enrolled at the Wenchi Methodist Secondary School from 1972 to 1977, where he obtained his GCE 'O' Level. He went on to the Wesley College, Kumasi, where he trained as a teacher from 1978 to 1981. He was awarded the Men's Prize in 1981, on completion of his tenure as the Men's Secretary.

Between 1989 and 1992, he studied for a bachelor's degree in Philosophy and the Study of Religions at the University of Ghana, Legon. In 1996, he was awarded a World Church Office Scholarship to for his Master of Theology Degree (MTh) at Queen's University, Belfast. Upon the recommendation of the scholarship's sponsors, the Methodist Church in Ireland and the Methodist Church Ghana, he pursued a doctorate in Wesleyan Studies from the same institution. He received a PhD in 1999.

== Career ==
=== Pastoral work ===
Paul Boafo was a pupil teacher at the St. Peter and Paul Anglican Primary School in Saltpond in the Central Region of Ghana in 1977. In his early career, he taught at the Mpasatia Methodist Primary School. Initially a lay preacher, Boafo was commissioned a probationer on 8 June 1986 at the Wesley Cathedral in Accra, and subsequently ordained a full Methodist agent three years later on 27 August 1989 at the Wesley Cathedral in Sunyani. He was a columnist for the Christian Sentinel, the official newspaper of the Methodist Church Ghana. Paul Boafo co-edited the church's Weekly Bible Lesson and edited the Methodist Times from 2000 to 2016.

Paul Boafo was the Methodist chaplain at the Osei Tutu Secondary School at Akropong-Ashanti. Simultaneously, he was the attached adjunct minister to three local congregations in the Amakom circuit.

- Ebenezer Methodist Church, Pankrono, formerly in the Old Tafo Circuit,
- Mount Zion Methodist Church, Ahensan
- Emmanuel Methodist Church, Atonsu

Paul Boafo was the first resident minister at the Akyem Otwereso in the Akim Oda Circuit. Boafo was the Superintendent Minister at the:

- New Achimota Circuit in the Accra Diocese from 1999 to 2001
- Accra North Circuit, Adabraka between 2001 and 2005

Boafo also held the following positions:

- Attester to the Kumasi Synod and Methodist Conferences
- Diocesan Chaplain to the Association of Methodist Men's Fellowships, Kumasi
- Member, Methodist Conference

He was appointed the resident Protestant Chaplain at the KNUST, where he lectured at the Religious Studies Department. He served on different committees including

- Queen Elizabeth II Hall Council
- KNUST Health Services Management Board
- Committee of University Ecumenical Chaplaincy Board
- KNUST Local Council of Churches
- University Syllabus Review Committee, Methodist University College Ghana

Paul Boafo also served as an auxiliary minister at the following four stations:

- Christ the King Methodist Church, Asokwa
- St. Paul's Methodist Church, Kentinkromo
- Aldersgate Methodist Church, Ayigya Annex
- Bethel Methodist Church, Ayigya

==== Presiding Bishop of the Methodist Church ====
After serving as the Administrative Bishop of the Methodist Church Ghana, Boafo was elected as the Presiding Bishop and assumed office after an induction service on 1 October 2018 for a six-year, non-renewable term of office. The induction service, held at the Wesley Cathedral, Cape Coast, saw a grand parade by the Cape Coast Diocesan Brigade under the Command of the Connexional Brigade executives. The cathedral historically and symbolically served as the mother Diocese of the Methodist Church Ghana dating to the first half of the nineteenth century. In attendance at the induction ceremony were 2000 congregants including serving and retired members of the church hierarchy; Diocesan Bishops, Lay Presidents, General Directors and Directors, Synod Secretaries, Lay Chairmen, Boards, Chairmen of Advisory teams, affiliates of the Methodists Church Ghana, Foreign Missions, visitors, invited guests, family and friends and the media. The ceremony was also attended the Vice-President of Ghana, Mahamudu Bawumia.

At the service, he was enrobed in ceremonial vestments for the office and received a staff; a Bible; a ring; and a stole, signifying his new role as the figurehead of the Ghanaian Methodist Church and its heritage, doctrines, teachings and expansion. In his homily, the Presiding Bishop, Titus Kofi Awotwi Pratt, preached on the theme Avail yourselves to God inspired by Judges 13:2-7.

=== Academia ===
Paul Boafo's teaching, research and writing is under Wesleyan theology. By 2000, he had assumed the role of adjunct professor and facilitator in Wesleyan Studies, specialising in theological education and ministerial formation at the Trinity Theological Seminary, Legon. He had a similar stint at the Methodist University College, Dansoman where he taught causes in professional ethics in a Wesleyan context. At the Freeman Centre for Leadership and Development, he led the facilitation of evangelist education. He was appointed a senior lecturer in historical theology at the Kwame Nkrumah University of Science and Technology (KNUST). He is a professional scholar of the American-based Wesleyan Philosophical Society and Wesleyan Theological Society.

== Personal life ==
Paul Boafo is married to Helena Ewurabena Boafo and they have three adult daughters.
