= Joseph Ampah Kojo Essel =

Ghanaian politician (1921-?)

Member of the Ghana Parliament for Dompim
- In office June 1965 – 24 February 1966
- Preceded by: New
- Succeeded by: Constituency abolished

Personal details
- Born: Joseph Ampah Kojo Essel; 1921 (age 104–105) Sefwi-Bekwai, Western Region, Gold Coast
- Party: Convention People's Party
- Education: Wesley College, Kumasi; Adisadel College
- Occupation: Politician

Joseph Ampah Kojo Essel was a Ghanaian Member of Parliament for the Dompim constituency from 1965 to 1966.

== Early life ==
Essel was born in 1921 at Sefwi-Bekwai in the Western Region of Ghana (then Gold Coast). He had his Middle School education at the Sefwi-Wiawso Government Middle School where he obtained his Standard Seven Certificate in 1937. He entered Wesley College, Kumasi in 1938 but transferred to Adisadel College a year later. His stay at Adisadel College was however, truncated in 1940 when his guardian died.

== Career and politics ==
Essel begun his career in 1942 with the Gold Coast Army as a trained mechanic at the Base Workshops in Accra. He worked with the army until 1946. A year later, he obtained employment as a mechanic with C. F. A. O. in Kumasi. That same year he quit his career as a mechanic to enter the cocoa buying trade. He became a licensed cocoa buying agent under one Opanyin Adofoasa of Ntroso in the Brong Ahafo Region during the main season of 1947 and 1948. In 1949 he left the job to become a petty trader. While he indulged in petty trade, he engaged in cocoa farming in 1950 at Ashiam, a village in Sefwi-Bekwai.

In January 1955, he was appointed District Secretary of the United Ghana Farmers Council. He also served as a Union Secretary and Assistant Marketing Officer of the Western Region prior to his appointment as the District Commissioner for Bibiani in July 1959. He later became the Regional Secretary of the Convention People's Party in 1962 and in June 1965, he was made the member of parliament for the Dompim constituency. He held the appointments of Regional Secretary and member of parliament until 24 February 1966 when the Nkrumah government was overthrown.

== Personal life ==
Essel married Madam Abena Kunadu also known by the name, Mary Acquah in 1949 however, the marriage was dissolved in 1955. Together, they had three children. In 1950, he married Madam Yaa Wiredua and together they had three children as well. His second marriage ended in 1958. His third marriage was with Madam Theresa Yaa Mansa in 1954. Together, they also had three children.

== See also ==
- List of MPs elected in the 1965 Ghanaian parliamentary election
