= Samuel Okai Quashie-Idun =

Ghanaian lawyer and judge

Sir Samuel Okai Quarshie-Idun

President of the Court of Appeal for Eastern Africa
- In office 14 February 1964 – 19 December 1965
- Preceded by: Sir. Ronald Ormiston Sinclair
- Succeeded by: Sir. Charles Demoree Newbold

Chief Justice of the High Court of Western Nigeria
- In office 1960–1964
- Preceded by: Dr. Robert Yorke Hedges
- Succeeded by: Eugene Olufemi Adeyinka Morgan

Personal details
- Born: 15 January 1902 Cape Coast, Gold Coast
- Died: 12 March 1966, age 64 London, England
- Spouse: Charlotte Quashie-Idun
- Education: Mfantsipim School; Selwyn College, Cambridge

Sir Samuel Okai Quarshie-Idun was a Ghanaian lawyer and judge. He worked as a lawyer in the Gold Coast from 1927 to 1936 and entered judicial service as a magistrate in 1936, rising through the ranks to become Chief Justice of the High Court of Western Nigeria in 1960 and President of the Court of Appeal for Eastern Africa in 1964.

== Early life and education ==
Quarshie-Idun was born on 15 January 1902 at Cape Coast, the capital city of the Central Region of Ghana. He had his secondary education at Mfantsipim School and continued to Selwyn College, Cambridge for his Bachelor of Arts and Master of Arts degrees. He was called to the bar in 1927 at Inner Temple, London.

== Career ==
Quarshie-Idun begun as a private legal practitioner after he was called to the bar in 1927 until 1936 when he was appointed District Magistrate. He served as a District Magistrate until 22 January 1948, when he was promoted to Puisne Judge of the Supreme Court by the then King of the United Kingdom, George VI. While a Puisne Judge, he was a member of the Commission of Enquiry that investigated the Enugu (Nigeria) disturbances in 1949. Between 1956 and 1958 he served as the acting chief justice of the supreme court of the Gold Coast and later Ghana on several occasions. He resigned in 1958 as a puisne judge of the Supreme Court of Ghana to take up an appointment in Nigeria, carrying out special judicial duties earlier that year prior to his appointment as justice of the High Court of Western Nigeria. He was later appointed Chief Justice of the High Court of Western Nigeria in 1960, succeeding Dr. Robert Yorke Hedges. He served in this capacity until his appointment to preside over the Court of Appeal for Eastern Africa in 1964. He succeeded Sir. Ronald Ormiston Sinclair who had proceeded to the United Kingdom on leave pending his retirement on 15 January 1964. He arrived in Nairobi from Nigeria on 11 February 1964 and was sworn into office on 14 February 1964, becoming the first African and the first West African for that matter to occupy this position. He served in this capacity until his retirement on 19 December 1965.

== Personal life ==
Quashie-Idun was a member and first president of the Ashanti Cultural Society of Ghana, a member of the Methodist Church of Ghana and a choir master at his church, president of the Rotary Club of Ibadan, a member of the Rotary Club of Nairobi, and a member of the Kiambu Club from 1964 to 1965. He died in London's University College Hospital on 12 March 1966.

== See also ==
- East African Court of Appeal
