= Kwabena Opuni Frimpong =

Ghanaian academic and minister

The Rev. Dr. Kwabena Opuni Frimpong
- Born: Ghana

Academic background
- Education: Trinity Theological Seminary, Legon (Dipl.-Theol.); University of Ghana, Legon (B.A.); Union Presbyterian Seminary, (MTh); University of Natal / Akrofi-Christaller Institute (PhD)
- Thesis: Theological Construction of Akan Chieftaincy In Contemporary Ghana: Perspectives on Christian Leadership

Academic work
- Discipline: Study of religions
- Institutions: Trinity Theological Seminary, Legon; All Nations University College; Pentecost University College; Kwame Nkrumah University of Science and Technology

Ecclesiastical career
- Church: Presbyterian Church of Ghana
- Offices held: General Secretary, Christian Council of Ghana

Kwabena Opuni Frimpong is a Ghanaian academic and Presbyterian minister who served as the General Secretary of the Christian Council of Ghana (CCG), equivalent to the chief executive officer of the ecumenical organisation. He is also a lecturer at the Kwame Nkrumah University of Science and Technology (KNUST).

== Early life and education ==
An ethnic Asante native, Kwabena Opuni Frimpong received a diploma in theology from the Trinity Theological Seminary, Legon. He earned a bachelor's degree in political science and the study of religions at the University of Ghana, Legon. He studied for his master of theology, concentrating in Christian education at the Union Presbyterian Seminary in Richmond, Virginia, where he wrote his thesis on "The relevance of Paulo Freire’s humanization education theory on the youth ministry of the Presbyterian church of Ghana" He was awarded a joint PhD in African Christianity by the University of Natal, Pietermaritzburg in South Africa and Akrofi-Christaller Institute in Akropong, Ghana, and wrote his doctoral dissertation on "Theological Construction of Akan Chieftaincy In Contemporary Ghana: Perspectives on Christian Leadership."

== Career ==
=== Christian ministry ===
Opuni Frimpong was commissioned a minister of the Presbyterian Church of Ghana (PCG) in 1991 and ordained in 1993. He has served as a church minister at the following stations: the Christ Presbyterian Church, Akropong, Trinity Congregation Kwashieman, Christ Congregation Darkuman, Nantomah Memorial Congregation Kanda, Covenant Congregation Dzorwulu, Ascension Congregation North Legon, Christ Congregation KNUST Kumasi, Oforikrom Congregation Kumasi, and Trinity Congregation Kutunse.

He was also the General Youth Secretary of the Presbyterian church and coordinated the student and youth ministry. In this role, he was a member the Synod Committee and Synod Committee Executive Committee. He was a member of the following committees National Christian Education Committee, National Worship Committee and the Project Manager of the HIV/AIDS Project, an initiative started by the Presbyterian church. He was the General Secretary of the National Ministers’ Conference. An advocate of interfaith dialogue, he served as Travelling Secretary of Scripture Union in the Ashanti Akim Area and later, the National Executive Committee of the Scripture Union Ghana.

Opuni Frimpong was elected the Presbytery Chairperson of the Asante Presbytery in charge of 51 Districts, 776 churches, 124 pastors and 113,680 congregants. He officiated at the consecration ceremonies of church agents and catechists. Under his leadership in the Asante Presbytery, the district count increased from 29 to 51. The Asante South and the Sefwi Presbyteries were carved out of the Asante Presbytery during his tenure.

As chairperson, the Presbytery's Bookshop and Sales Depot, Guest House were refurbished. A new secondary school, the Pakyi Presbyterian Senior High School and a medical clinic, the Mesewam Presbyterian Clinic were also built. He initiated the "Mission to the Palace" program which was an evangelism effort targeting traditional rulers and royal courtiers in the palaces.

He was appointed the General Secretary of the Christian Council of Ghana (CCG), founded on 29 October 1929. He oversaw operations and supervised 41 employees. The CCG has 31 independent churches under its membership. At the CCG, he partnered with several international development organisations, Bread for the World, Christian Aid, UNDP, WHO, UNICEF, UNFPA, DANIDA, UNHCR. In addition, his areas of advocacy include HIV/AIDS, governance, human rights, elections, violence against women, ecumenical relation, migration and child trafficking.

=== Academia ===
Since 2005, he has been a lecturer at the Department of Religious Studies at the KNUST. At the university, he has served on a few statutory boards such as the University Academic Board, College of Art and Social Sciences Board, Faculty of Social Sciences Board, Department of Religious Studies Board, and Chaired the Post Graduate Admissions Interview Committee of the department. He was instrumental in the introduction of Master of Philosophy in Religious Studies program. Some courses he has taught include public theology, religion and public policy in Africa, Christianity and African culture, religion and media, African indigenous knowledge systems and Christian missions and Christian education.

As a visiting fellow, Opuni Frimpong taught theology-related courses at the University of Natal, Pietermaritzburg and at the Stellenbosch University, both in South Africa. He is an adjunct lecturer at the Pentecost University College, Accra, Trinity Theological Seminary Legon as well as a Moderator of the Department of Biblical Studies at the All Nations University College, Koforidua.

=== Public service ===
He served as an advisor at the Ghanaian presidency. He was a member of the Presidential Debate Committee for the 2016 General Elections and the Advisory Committee of “Winner Takes All”, both sponsored by the Institute of Economic Affairs (IEA), a think-tank in Accra. He also served on the boards of several Kumasi-based educational institutions: Prempeh College, Ramseyer Vocational and Technical Institute, Atwima Kwanwoma Presbyterian Senior High School, Pakyi and Presbyterian Girls Senior High School, Kyiriapatre.

== Personal life ==
Opuni Frimpong and his wife, Abigail have five adult children; Daniel, Abigail, Miriam, Emmanuella and Mary.

== Selected works ==
Some of his published books include:

- Indigenous Knowledge and Christian Missions: (perspectives of Akan Leadership Formation on Christian Leadership Development)
- Christian Advocacy Ministry
- Vision and Missions.
