= Lynn Clark =

Lynn Clark may refer to:

- Lynn G. Clark (born 1956), American professor of botany
- Lynn Schofield Clark, media critic and scholar
