= Cecilia Koranteng-Addow =

Ghanaian barrister and judge

Ghanaian High Court judge
- In office 1975–1982

Personal details
- Born: Cecilia Afran Gaisie; 24 May 1936 Assin Nsuta, Gold Coast
- Died: 30 June 1982 (aged 46) Accra, Ghana
- Cause of death: Murder (gunshot wound)
- Buried: Osu Cemetery, Accra, Ghana
- Spouses: Nicholas Liverpool; m. 1963, d. 1969; Gustav Koranteng-Addow; m. 1974
- Children: Philip Liverpool; Rebecca Gumbs (née Liverpool); Susan Imbeah (née Liverpool); Nana Ama Brantuo (née Liverpool)
- Parents: Philip Afran Gaisie; Mary Adwoa Kwansaa Boafo
- Education: Holy Child High School, Ghana; University of Hull; Lincoln's Inn
- Occupation: Ghanaian High court judge
- Known for: Her work as a Ghanaian High court judge, Her murder in 1982
- Monuments: Memorial to the Martyrs of the Rule of Law in front of the Supreme Court of Ghana buildings

Cecilia Koranteng-Addow (née Gaisie, 24 May 1936 – 30 June 1982) was a High Court judge in Ghana from 1975 until her abduction and murder on 30 June 1982, during the second military rule of Jerry Rawlings.

== Early life and education ==
Cecilia Afran Gaisie was born in Assin Nsuta, Gold Coast (now Ghana) in 1936 to Philip Afran Gaisie, a businessman, and Mary Adwoa Kwansaa Boafo, a housewife and one of Cecilia's father's six wives. She belonged to the Royal Asenie family of Adansi Medoma.

Cecilia attended primary school at the Roman Catholic School at Assin Anyinabrim, and at the Assin Edubiase Methodist School, near Assin Nsuta. She then went to secondary school in nearby Cape Coast, first attending middle school at Our Lady of Apostles (OLA) College of Education and then completing her secondary education at Holy Child High School. In 1959, Cecilia moved to the United Kingdom where she studied law (LLB) at the University of Hull. She was called to the bar at Lincoln's Inn in London in 1963.

== Career ==
After completing her tertiary education in the UK, Cecilia returned to Ghana in 1964 and began working as a lawyer in the private legal practice of Opoku Acheampong and Company. She was eventually recruited as a magistrate by the Ghanaian Judicial Service. After working for several years as a judge in Ghana's district court and circuit court, Cecilia was appointed as a High Court judge in 1975, a position which she held until her death in 1982.

In 1980, Cecilia ruled in favour of a businessman named Mr Shackleford, who had been detained during the 1979 revolution led by Jerry Rawlings. Cecilia held that there was no justification for the detention and directed his release. Cecilia was the first judge to have questioned the transitional provisions of the Armed Forces Revolutionary Council (AFRC) inserted in the 1979 constitution and she set free an AFRC convict. She also decided a case involving the rioting workers of Ghana Industrial Holding Corporation (GIHOC) who attacked parliament in Ghana's Third Republic. Joachim Amartey Quaye, one of the leaders of the rioting workers, subsequently became a member of Rawlings’ Provisional National Defence Council (PNDC), which was the ruling party at the time of Cecilia's murder in 1982. Amartey Quaye was later tried and convicted of his role in Cecilia's murder.

== Personal life ==
Cecilia's first husband was Nicholas Liverpool, who went on to serve as the sixth president of Dominica from 2003 to 2012. Cecilia and Nicholas met during their studies at the University of Hull and married in 1963. They had four children together. In 1969, they divorced, and in 1974, Cecilia married Gustav Koranteng-Addow, a judge who served as Attorney General of Ghana from 1975 to 1979. Cecilia and Gustav met through work and remained married until Cecilia's death in 1982. They had no children together.

== Death and legacy ==
Cecilia was abducted and murdered in secret on 30 June 1982, along with two other High Court justices, Frederick Poku Sarkodee and Kwadwo Agyei Agyepong, and a retired army officer, Sam Acquah, during the second military rule of Rawlings. Rawlings had ousted President Hilla Limann in a coup d’etat on 31 December 1981. The murders took place at the Bundase military shooting range in the Accra Plains during the hours of a night-time curfew. Their charred bodies were discovered in that location the following day. Following intense pressure on Rawlings and the PNDC, a Special Investigation Board was formed by the government to investigate the murders. In 1992, The Independent reported findings of the Special Investigation Board's inquiry in Ghana, which it said had recommended the prosecution of 10 people for the murders, including Ghana's head of national security at the time Kojo Tsikata. Tsikata, who was Rawlings' right-hand man, filed a defamation lawsuit against The Independent on 26 March 1993, which he agreed to drop after The Independent published a correction statement in September 1998, in which they clarified that they had not intended to suggest that Tsikata was guilty of the crimes. Lance Corporal Amedeka, Michael Senyah, Tekpor Hekli, Johnny Dzandu and Joachim Amartey Quaye were indicted for the murders in 1983. In June 1983, before the trial could be completed, Amedeka escaped from the Nsawam and Ussher Fort prisons where they were being held and left Ghana. Senya, Hekli, Dzandu and Amartey Quaye were found guilty of murder, sentenced to death and executed by firing squad.

Cecilia and the other two murdered justices are remembered in an annual judicial service on the anniversary of their deaths, called Martyrs Day, in Ghana. The Memorial to the Martyrs of the Rule of Law, which includes statues of all three murdered justices, stands in front of the Supreme Court of Ghana buildings today.

The Esi Afran Foundation was founded in Cecilia's memory in 2011, by her childhood friend Josephine van Lare and two of her children, Philip Liverpool and Nana Ama Brantuo (née Liverpool), with the goal of improving the lives of young women through education and training. The foundation currently works to improve the standard of education in Ghana by providing financial support and advice to other organisations that focus on education.
