= Hilary Gbedemah =

Ghanaian lawyer and women's rights activist

- Born: Hilary Amesika Gbedemah; October 1, 1953 (age 73)
- Occupation: Lawyer

Hilary Amesika Gbedemah is Ghanaian lawyer and a women's rights activist. She has been a member of the UN Committee on the Elimination of All Forms of Discrimination Against Women (CEDAW) since 2013, and was the Committee's chairperson between 2019 and February 2021. Gbedemah's term on the UN Committee on the Elimination of All Forms of Discrimination Against Women expired on 31 December 2024.

== Education ==
In 1975, Gbedemah graduated from the University of Ghana, Legon, with a bachelor's degree in Law, and in 1977, she was called to the Bar. She obtained a master's degree in law from Georgetown University, Washington. Gbedemah also holds a certificate in International Humanitarian Law from the Henri Dunant Institute, Geneva, and a diploma in Leadership and Advocacy from Georgetown University.

== Career ==
Gbedemah was the rector of the Law Institute in Ghana. In 2013, Gbedemah was first appointed to CEDAW to serve for two years. During her first tenure, some of the working groups she served on included Access to Justice, which produced CEDAW's General Recommendation No. 33 on women's Access to Justice; the Right to Education; Climate Change and Disaster Risk Reduction; and Inquiries under the Optional Protocol. She also delivered papers at the 59th Session of the CSW in New York and the International Women and Justice Summit in Turkey.

== Publications ==
Some of her publications include:

- Trokosi: Twentieth Century Female Bondage – A Ghanaian Case Study
- Rape and Defilement
- Interventions available to Victims of Rape and Defilement
- Safety Planning – Preventing Rape and Defilement and Enhancing Women’s Representation in Governance through Affirmative Action
