= Michael A. Bossman =

Ghanaian Methodist minister

The Right Reverend Michael Agyakwa Bossman
- Education: Mfantsipim School; Trinity Theological Seminary, Legon (Dipl.-Theol.); University of Ghana (B.A., MPhil)
- Occupation: Methodist minister
- Spouse: Elizabeth Oye Bossman
- Children: 3
- Parents: Matthew Agyakwa Bossman (father); Matilda Oye Bossman (mother)

Ecclesiastical career
- Church: Methodist Church Ghana
- Ordained: Wesley Cathedral, Koforidua, 1990
- Offices held: Administrative Bishop, Methodist Church Ghana (2018 – 2024)

Michael Agyakwa Bossman is a Ghanaian clergyman who served as the Administrative Bishop of the Methodist Church Ghana from 2018 to 2024, in effect the chief administrator or the secretary-general of the national church organisation.

== Early life and education ==
Michael Agyakwa Bossman, a native of Larteh Akuapem, is the son of the Rev. Matthew Agyakwa Bossman and Matilda Oye Bossman.

Bossman was a pupil at the Radiant Way Preparatory School in Accra and Chapel Hill Preparatory in Takoradi. After graduating from the Aburi Presbyterian Middle Boys' Boarding School, Amanfo, he enrolled at the Mfantsipim School where he obtained his G. C. E. 'O Level' in 1978 and 'A' Level in 1980. After his secondary education, Bossman was employed as a technical officer at the University of Ghana Agricultural Research Station, Okumanin, Kade after his protégé, Joseph Atto Brown, a Methodist minister was transferred from Okuapeman Secondary School to Kade.

Between 1985 and 1988, he studied at the Trinity Theological Seminary, Legon, upon the recommendation of a Methodist minister, J. M. Donkor. In 1988, he was a commissioned as a probationer and ordained in 1990 at the Wesley Cathedral, Koforidua by Kwesi Dickson who served as the President of Methodist Church Ghana from 1990 to 1997. In 1989, he earned a bachelor's degree in the study of religions and psychology from the University of Ghana, Legon and in 1993, he received an MPhil in New Testament Studies from the same institution.

== Pastoral career ==
In the Christian ministry, he has been the minister at several parishes, including Accra Ridge Church from 2003 to 2008. During his career he has served in several church administrative roles including Bishop of Koforidua from 2012 to 2018. In 2018, during the 10th Biennial and 48th Delegates Conference, Michael Agyakwa Bossman was elected as the new Administrative Bishop of the Methodist Church Ghana to succeed Paul Boafo who had been elevated to the rank of Presiding Bishop of the Methodist Church Ghana.

== Personal life ==
Together with his wife, Elizabeth Oye Bossman, he raised three sons, Michael, Jonathan and Emmanuel and a dependent. Stephen. His wife is an educator and a Deputy Director of Education at the Guidance and Counseling Unit of the Ghana Education Service.
