= Agyapong =

Agyapong or Agyepong is a Ghanaian surname that may refer to

- Akosua Agyapong (born 1969), Ghanaian highlife artiste and television personality
- Finette Agyapong (born 1997), English sprinter
- Flings Owusu-Agyapong (born 1988), Ghanaian sprinter
- Francis Agyepong (born 1965), English triple jumper
- Heather Agyepong (born 1990), English actress, photographer, and visual artist
- Jacqui Agyepong, (born 1969), English hurdler, sister of Francis
- Kennedy Agyapong, Ghanaian politician and businessman
- Kwabena Agyapong (born 1962), Ghanaian civil engineer, politician and sports journalist
- Thomas Agyepong (born 1996), Ghanaian football winger
