= Daniel Buadi =

Ghanaian educationist and politician

Daniel Buadi was a Ghanaian educationist, politician, and traditional ruler. He was a member of parliament for the Assin Constituency from 1954 to 1965 and the Assin-Atandaso Constituency from 1965 to 1966.

== Early life and education ==
Buadi was born in 1921 at Assin Juaso in the Central Region of Ghana (then the Gold Coast). He had his early education at the Edubiase Methodist School at Agona Swedru, where he obtained his Primary School Leaving Certificate in 1935. He continued at Mfantsipim School in 1936 for his secondary education but left that same year for Wesley College of Education in Kumasi, where he trained as a teacher from 1936 to 1941.

== Career and politics ==
Buadi began as a teacher at the Asokore and Fosu middle schools prior to his appointment as headmaster of the Akrodie Methodist Primary School in the Ahafo Region. Prior to entering parliament in 1954, Buadi served as the Chairman of the Assin Confederacy Local Council. Buadi was the member of parliament for the Assin Rural Constituency on the ticket of the Convention People's Party from 1954 to 1965. Following the addition of new constituencies in 1965, he became the member of parliament for the Assin-Atandaso Constituency from 1965 until 1966, when the Nkrumah government was overthrown. In 1969, he was installed as chief of Kwasaman in the Gyase division of the Assin Attandasu Traditional Area.
