= Bekwai (disambiguation) =

Bekwai may refer to

== Town ==
- Bekwai a town in the Ashanti Region of Ghana
- Sefwi Bekwai a town in the Western Region of Ghana

== Constituency ==
- Bekwai (Ghana parliament constituency)

== District ==
- Bekwai Municipal Assembly
