= Stewart Hoover =

American academic

Stewart Mark Hoover (born April 14, 1951) is a Professor of Media Studies and Professor Adjoint of Religious Studies at the University of Colorado at Boulder. He is the founder and director of the Center for Media, Religion and Culture. His research interest centers on media audience and reception studies rooted in cultural studies, anthropology and qualitative sociology. He is known for his work on media and religion, particularly in the phenomenon of televangelism, and later in religion journalism. His most recent work involves household-level studies of media audience practices of meaning-making and identity. Supported by a series of grants from the Lilly Endowment and the Ford Foundation, this work investigates the extent to which the media sphere as a whole and the various media which comprise it constitute a central site of meaning practice (including religious meaning practice) in contemporary domestic and global life. Through the center he directs, he has also become influential in scholarly discourses about the public understanding and role of religion globally and the ways those are rooted in its mediation.

== Biography ==
Hoover was born in Imperial, Nebraska, but he grew up in Rocky Ford, Colorado. His father, Wilbur R. Hoover, was a minister at the Church of the Brethren in Rocky Ford, and he was thus raised in a religious environment in a small town of 4,000 people. Under the influence of his father, Hoover developed an interest in media and religion early on his life. Rev. Hoover used to subscribe to a variety of local and national newspapers, including New York Times Sunday and Denver newspapers, and often discussed his insights on media and religion with his family.

After high school, Hoover left his hometown to get a B.A. in philosophy and religion at McPherson College, a liberal arts college founded by the leaders of the Church of the Brethren, in McPherson, Kansas. He graduated in 1973 then he moved to California to pursue an M.A. in ethics from Pacific School of Religion/Graduate Theological Union in Berkeley. While he was there, he participated in its Religion and Society Seminar, organized by Robert N. Bellah. During two years of his M.A training, Hoover studied under John Coleman, SJ., Karen Lebacqz, and George Conklin. After he graduated in 1975, he moved to Elgin, Illinois to work as a consultant for Media Education and Advocacy for the Church of Brethren General Board. For four years Hoover and his wife, Karen Woody Hoover, stayed in Elgin where he also did a media reform work and participated in the creation of a nationally known media literacy curriculum, Television Awareness Training.

In 1979, Hoover began his studies toward the M.A. and PhD degrees in communications at the Annenberg School for Communication, University of Pennsylvania. As a graduate student he worked under George Gerbner (who was dean of the Annenberg School for Communication at that time) on the Cultural Indicators Project Gerbner directed along with Professor Larry Gross. Gerbner later served (along with Carolyn Marvin) on Hoover's dissertation committee, which was chaired by Larry Gross. His dissertation, a qualitative study of the audience for Pat Robertson's 700 Club program, was later published, in revised form, as Mass Media Religion: The Social Sources of the Electric Church (Sage, 1988), in a series edited by Robert White.

After he received his Ph.D. in 1985, Hoover was hired as an Assistant Professor by School of Communication and Theater, Temple University, Philadelphia. He stayed there for six years, becoming Associate Dean for Research and Graduate Studies in Temple's School of Communication and Theater, before he moved to University of Colorado at Boulder in 1991.

In the Fall of 1996, Hoover was a Fellow at the Swedish Collegium for Advanced Study in Uppsala, Sweden.

== Theoretical contribution ==
Hoover's scholarly work has built on –and expanded— theoretical convergences between the fields of media studies and religious studies. In particular, his book Rethinking media, religion and culture (co-authored with Knut Lundby) is a foundational text at the intersection of these two fields. In media studies, he is identified with culturalist and interpretivist turns that have deepened and nuanced prior, more objectivist and quantitative directions, demonstrating that such approaches are essential to understanding the complex and layered phenomena circulating around the idea of "the religious." His work on household media use studies have demonstrated helpful directions and results from such approaches to understanding the audience. In the field of religious studies, he has been active in "new paradigm" religion research which stresses practice over structure or function, opening a wide field of contemporary religious phenomena in media and commodity culture to scholarly view.

== Selected publications ==
- Co-Editor, with Monica Emerich. Media, Spiritualities, and Social Change. London: Continuum Press, 2010.
- Co-Editor, with Nadia Kaneva. Fundamentalisms and the Media. London: Continuum Press, 2008.
- Religion in the Media Age. London: Routledge, 2006.
- Co-Author, with Lynn Schofield Clark, Diane F. Alters, Joseph G. Champ and Lee Hood. Media, Home and Family. New York: Routledge, 2004.
- Co-Editor, with Lynn Schofield Clark. Practicing Religion in the Age of the Media: Explorations in Media, Religion, and Culture. New York: Columbia University Press, 2002.
- Religion in the News: Faith and Journalism in American Public Discourse. London: Sage, 1998.
- Co-Editor, with Knut Lundby. Rethinking Media, Religion, and Culture. London: Sage, 1997.
- Co-Editor, with Robert Abelman. Religious Television: Controversies and Conclusions. Norwood, NJ: Ablex Press, 1990.
- Mass Media Religion: The Social Sources of the Electronic Church. Beverly Hills: Sage, 1988.
- The Electronic Giant: A Critique of the Telecommunications Revolution from a Christian Perspective. Elgin, Illinois: The Brethren Press, 1982.
