= Ronald Sinclair (judge) =

New Zealand-born judge

Sir Ronald Ormiston Sinclair, KBE, (2 May 1903 – 18 November 1996) was a New Zealand lawyer and judge who served in the British Colonial Service.

== Biography ==
Sinclair was born in 1903. Sources differ whether the place of birth was Auckland or Dunedin. His father was the Reverend William Sinclair, who had emigrated to New Zealand from Britain in 1855. His mother was Rosa Elizabeth Nicolls (née Ormiston).

Sinclair was educated at Elmwood and Gloucester Street primary schools in Christchurch, followed by Christchurch Boys' High School. He continued his secondary education at New Plymouth Boys' High School. He received his tertiary education at the University of Auckland before moving to Britain to study at Balliol College, Oxford.

On graduation, he returned to New Zealand and was called to the New Zealand Bar in 1924. He entered the Colonial Service in 1931 and worked as a Magistrate in Nigeria until 1938. He then moved to Northern Rhodesia where he was appointed Resident Magistrate. He was called to the Bar in England by the Middle Temple in 1939.

In 1946, he was promoted to a Puisne Judge in Tanganyika and remained in the post until 1953 when he was again advanced, this time to Chief Justice of Nyasaland. Sinclair became Vice-President of the Court of Appeal for Eastern Africa in 1956 and that same year was knighted in the Queen's Birthday Honours. He assumed the office of Chief Justice of Kenya in 1957 and remained in office until 1963 when he became President of the Court of Appeal for Eastern Africa and later President of the Court of Appeal of The Bahamas. He was appointed KBE in 1963.

He retired from service in 1964 and died in New Zealand on 18 November 1996. He was buried at Purewa Cemetery in the Auckland suburb of Meadowbank. His son Anthony Ronald Entrican Sinclair is a noted biologist.
