= Samuel Otu Gyandoh =

Ghanaian academic and lawyer (1933–2021)

Prof. Samuel Otu Gyandoh
- Born: Samuel Otu Gyandoh; June 2, 1933; Gold Coast (now Ghana)
- Died: January 26, 2021 (aged 87)
- Education: Mfantsipim School; University of Southampton; Yale University
- Occupations: Academic; Lawyer
- Known for
- Scientific career
- Fields: Constitutional law; Administrative law
- Workplaces: University of Ghana; Temple University School of Law

Samuel Otu Gyandoh was a Ghanaian lawyer and academic. He was an emeritus professor of Law at the Temple University School of Law.

== Early life and education ==
Gyandoh was born on 2 June 1933. He hailed from Abakrampa, a town in the Central Region. He entered Mfantsipim School in 1949, where he obtained his Cambridge School Certificate in 1952 and his higher School Certificate in 1954. He later proceeded to the United Kingdom in 1956 where he studied law at undergraduate level at the University of Southampton, and was awarded his bachelor of laws degree in 1960. He gained admission to study law at the postgraduate level at Yale University in 1963. There he was awarded his LL.M in 1965.

== Career ==
=== Academia ===
Gyandoh was called to the English Bar in 1960, and the Ghana Bar in January 1961. Following his studies at the United Kingdom, Gyandoh returned to Ghana and entered private legal practice, he also took up a teaching appointment at the University of Ghana where he taught Company and Mercantile law at the School of Administration from January 1961 to September 1962. He joined the University of Ghana's faculty of Law in October 1962 as a lecturer, and in January 1971, he was elevated to the status of a senior lecturer. In 1977 he became an associate professor at the faculty. He taught constitutional and administrative law at both the university's Law Faculty, and the university's Business School. At the University of Ghana, he served as the dean of the Faculty of Law, and the Mensah Sarbah hall master. He also taught law at the University of Leiden Faculty of Law from 1976 to 1977 and the Temple University School of Law from 1982 to 2002. In 2002, he retired from the Temple University Law School and returned to private legal practice. He co-founded a law firm; Gyandoh Asmah, and worked with the firm as a senior partner.

=== Public service ===
From 1978 to 1979 when Ghana as a nation was preparing to transition from military rule to civilian rule, he was made a member of the Constitutional Commission and the Constituent Assembly that was responsible for the drafting of the Third Republic Constitution; the 1979 Constitution of Ghana. He was nominated Ombudsman by the then president; Hilla Limann, during the third republic. The nomination was however, withdrawn with no official reason stated.

Gyandoh served on various commissions, committees, and associations either a member or chairman, some of these commissions and committees include; the Commission of Inquiry Into The Affairs of the Ghana Academy of Sciences, which he served on from 1967 to 1969; the Committee on a Fitting Memorial for the Late Ex-President of Ghana Dr. Kwame Nkrumah, which he served on in 1974. He was a member of the Honorable Society of Middle Temple, London, and a founding member of National Advisory Council of Peace Corps in Ghana.

== Honours ==
In 2002 an award was established by the then president of Temple University; Peter J. Liacouras for international candidates pursuing a master's degree in law at the university who offered distinguished professional and personal service to the Law School community. This award was named in his honour.

== Works ==
Gyandoh's academic interests were in the fields of constitutional and administrative laws, and comparing legal institutions in public law. He authored many articles that were published in journals and various commentaries that were broadcast by Radio Ghana. Moreover, he participated in various panel discussions on Ghana Television (GTV), and the biennial conferences that were held by the World Peace Through world Law Center held in Washington, DC. His works include:

- Gyandoh and Griffiths’ Sourcebook of the Constitutional Law of Ghana, (Co-author with John Griffiths, 1972 and 2010);
- Some Legal Aspects of Peaceful Co-Existence, (Geneva, 1967);
- Human Rights in Developing Nations, (Bangkok, 1969, also rapporteur of conference workshop on human rights);
- Legal Education in Africa Today, With Special Reference to Ghana, (Abidjan, 1973).
- Liberty and the Courts (in Essays in Ghanaian Law, Faculty Publication, University of Ghana, 1976) (contribution);
- Ombudsman: Protection for the Citizens, (published by Centre for Civic Education, Accra, 1971) (Editor and Chief Contributor).

== Personal life ==
Gyandoh was a Christian and a member of the Methodist Church of Ghana. He was also a member of the royal house of Abakrampa of the Central Region of Ghana. He died on 26 January 2021.
