= Wesley College of Education, Kumasi =

Teacher education college in Kumasi, Ghana

Coordinates: 6.7132807°N 1.623867°W

Wesley College of Education
- Established: 1922; 104 years ago
- Location: Kumasi, Ashanti Region, Ghana
- Nickname: WESCO
- Website: Wesley College of Education

Wesley College of Education is a teacher education college in Kumasi, Ashanti Region in Ghana. It was initially established for the training of teachers, catechists and ministers. It was founded by the Methodist Church, located between New Tafo and Old Tafo towns. The beginning of Wesley College of Education goes back to 1918. Following the signing of the lease, the college was named, and the foundation stone of the present site was laid in 1922.

The courses offered in the college have gone through upgrading from 2-year Cert ‘B’; 4-year Cert ‘A’; 2-year Post-Secondary Cert ‘A; 3-year Post-Secondary Cert ‘A’; and now Diploma in Basic Education (DBE) by the passage of a Parliamentary Bill, Education Act 778 on 6 January 2008. Currently, Wesley College of Education offers special programmes at the Diploma in Basic Education level. These are Science, Mathematics and French.

The college participated in the DFID-funded Transforming Teacher Education and Learning (T-TEL) programme. It is affiliated to the Kwame Nkrumah University of Science and Technology

== History ==
Wesley College of Education was first established at Kemp, Aburi in 1922 and was moved to the present site on March 3, 1924. Nana Dabankah, the late Tafohene offered (104) one hundred and four acres of land to the Methodist Church, Gold Coast (British colony), to establish the college. It began with three tutors and thirty students to be trained as teacher-catechists.

Wesley College started with a two-year Post Middle Teacher's Certificate ‘B’ programme and went through the following programmes in line with government education policies: two-year Post ‘B’ Teacher's Certificate ‘A’, four-year Post Middle Teacher's Certificate ‘A’, two-year Post-Secondary Teacher's Certificate ‘A’ and three-year Post-Secondary Teacher's Certificate ‘A’. Wesley College of Education is now a Diploma Awarding Institution. It runs a three-year Diploma programme in Basic Education. Accreditation was given to that effect in October, 2007 by the National Accreditation Board (Ghana). The college is building capacity for degree programmes. Wesley College offered Specialist courses in Physical Education, Science and Mathematics, Home Science, and Agricultural Science in the mid-sixties and seventies. It was among the colleges that offered the Modular programme for untrained teachers in the eighties. French was introduced in 2001. Open Distance Learning was also introduced in December 2004 for untrained teachers for the award of Diploma in Basic Education. In August 2007, Wesley College was selected among 15 colleges nationwide to run a two-year Sandwich programme in Diploma in Basic Education for Certificate ‘A’ teachers.

The college has a current enrollment of one thousand one hundred and eighty-one full-time students, three hundred and twenty-six offer French, one hundred and fifty-four offer science while the rest do General Arts. There are nine visually impaired full-time students.

Nine hundred and thirty-four Cert. ‘A’ teachers and one thousand and ninety-four untrained teachers pursuing a two-year and four-year course respectively on sandwich basis for the award of Diploma in Basic Education in the college. Out of the untrained teachers, ten have Visual impairment. There are sixty-five teaching and sixty non-teaching staff.

The college has been headed by nine principals since 1922. They are:
Names	Years served
Rev.Charles Wesley Armstrong	July 1922 – April 1931
Rev. Alfred Gordon Simon April	April 1931 – April 1934
Rev. Arthur Wyatt Banks	Sept.1938 – Dec.1951
Mr. Samuel Hanson Amissah	Mar. 1952 –Aug. 1963
Rt. Rev. Dr. Ebenezer Harry Brew Riverson	Oct. 1963 – Jan.1985
Rev. Kofi Amponsah	Feb. 1985 – Oct.1996
Rev. Winfred Habel Yao Ametefe	Nov.1996 – Sept.2003
. Mr. Badu-Fordjour Anyan	Nov. 2003 –

== Notable alumni ==
The college since its inception has trained over fifteen thousand (15,000) teachers. Prominent among them are Kofi Abrefa Busia, Prime Minister of the Second Republic, Emmanuel W. Ellison, Snr, D. Y. Opoku, J. Y. A. Kwofie, J. Kwesi Lamptey, Ben Abdallah, Robert Dodoo, N. K. Pecku, E. H. Brew Riverson, Alex Tettey-Enyo, F. L. Bartels, Gyasi Nimako, Alex Dadey, Kwabena Agyapong, Yinka Sarfo, Yaw Frimpong Manso as well as T. W. Koomson, C. K. Yamoah, C. Awotwi-Pratt, E. S. Essamoah and Jacob S. Adama Stevens, who were past Presidents of Conference of the Methodist Church Ghana.

- Anthony Seibu Alec Abban, MP for Ajumako-Asikuma and later Ajumako during the First Republic
- Nii Ayikai Adjin-Tettey, Ghanaian athlete and national athletic coach
- Kwadwo Agyei Agyapong, one of the three High Court judges that were abducted and murdered on June 30, 1982.
- Timothy Ansah - MP for Tarkwa-Aboso during the First Republic
- Joe Appiah, Ghanaian lawyer, politician and statesman
- George Aryee, Director General of the Ghana Broadcasting Corporation (1991–1992)
- Paul Boafo, theologian and minister
- Kofi Abrefa Busia, Prime Minister of Ghana from 1969 to 1972
- Joseph Ampah Kojo Essel, MP for Dompim during the First Republic
- James Kojo Obeng, MP for Amansie during the First Republic
- Kobina Hagan, MP for Denkyira during the First Republic
- Nathaniel Azarco Welbeck, politician and diplomat
- Rhyda Ofori Amanfo, captain of the Ghana women's national cricket team

== See also ==
- List of colleges of education in Ghana
