= 1982 murders of Ghanaian judges and retired army officer =

June 1982 event near Accra, Ghana

- Location: Bundase military shooting range, near Accra, Ghana
- Date: 30 June 1982; 44 years ago 9:00pm – 10:30pm (GMT)
- Target: Sam Acquah; Kwadwo Agyei Agyapong; Cecilia Koranteng-Addow; Frederick Poku Sarkodee
- Attack type: abduction; mass murder; mass shooting
- Deaths: 4
- Perpetrators: Lance Corporal Samuel K. Amedeka; Michael Senya; Evans Tekpor Hekli; Ransford Johnny Dzandu; Joachim Amartey Quaye
- Charges: Attempted murder; Murder

On 30 June 1982 three high court judges and a retired army officer were abducted from their homes between the hours of 9:00pm and 10:30pm GMT and murdered at the Bundase military shooting range near Accra. The murders led to public outcry and the formation of a Special Investigations Board (SIB) to investigate the events. The report of the SIB led to the charging and trial of the perpetrators who were subsequently sentenced to death by firing squad. June 30 is commemorated every year as Martyrs Day in Ghana.

== Background ==
On June 4, 1979, the Supreme Military Council (SMC II) was overthrown by the Armed Forces Revolutionary Council (AFRC) led by Jerry Rawlings. Shortly after, the government handed over power to civilian authorities, leading to the establishment of civilian rule in September 1979. However, on 31 December 1981, Rawlings led another coup that toppled the civilian government of President Hilla Limann, once again returning the country to military rule. During this period, the government imposed curfew, and soldiers patrolled the streets in army jeeps, armed with assault rifles, to enforce the curfew.

It was during one of these curfew nights, on 30 June 1982, that soldiers abducted and murdered three high court judges and a retired army officer. Rumours spread, suggesting that members of the Provisional National Defence Council (PNDC) were involved in the killings, as the judges had previously overturned rulings made by the AFRC's People's Revolutionary Courts. One of the persons involved in the murders, Amartey Quaye, was a former secretary-general of the GIHOC Workers' Union and harboured resentment towards Major Sam Acquah. Acquah, who was the director of personnel at the Ghana Industrial Holdings Company (GIHOC) at the time, had signed the dismissal notices of Quaye and other labour leaders following a demonstration in Accra in 1981. This personal vendetta is believed to have motivated Quaye to include Acquah among the victims, who were viewed as "enemies of the revolution."

== Incident ==
On the night of 30 June 1982, between 9:00 pm and 10:30 pm, four Ghanaian citizens (three High Court judges and a retired army officer) were abducted and brutally murdered. The victims were Mrs. Justice Cecilia Koranteng-Addow, Justices Frederick Poku Sarkodee and Kwadwo Agyei Agyepong, and retired Major Sam Acquah. They were taken from their homes and transported to the Bundase military firing range near Accra, where they were shot. In an attempt to cover up the crime, their bodies were burnt. However, rains on the night of the murders partially extinguished the flames, and their charred remains were discovered three days later. Although their motives remained unclear, it was alleged that certain high-ranking government officials were directly involved, with the killings reportedly intended to resolve some earlier grievances.

In response to the discovery of the bodies, Chairman Rawlings appeared on national television to condemn the "hideous acts of terrorism" perpetrated by "enemies of the revolution." Despite his denouncement, rumours quickly spread that members of the Provisional National Defence Council (PNDC) were involved in the killings, especially since these judges had previously overturned decisions made by the Armed Forces Revolutionary Council's People's Revolutionary Courts. Father Vincent Damuah, a Catholic priest and member of the PNDC, called for an investigation into all extrajudicial killings that had been occurring and soon after resigned from the council. Facing widespread public outrage, the PNDC found itself on the defensive, prompting Rawlings to publicly assert his innocence and that of the PNDC.

In an effort to address public concern and demonstrate its commitment to justice, the PNDC established a Special Investigations Board (SIB) to investigate the murders, seeking to reassure Ghanaians that it was intent on solving what appeared to be politically motivated killings of opponents to the regime.

== Investigation and report ==
=== SIB Investigations ===
The Special Investigation Board (SIB) was established on 15 July 1982, under the Special Investigation Board (Kidnapping and Killing of Specified Persons) Law, 1982 (P.N.D.C. Law 15). Its mandate was to investigate the abduction and murder of three High Court judges and the retired soldier.

During the ongoing investigations, Samuel Azu Crabbe, chairman of the Special Investigations Board (SIB) and former Chief Justice of Ghana, submitted a resignation letter to the Attorney-General, Mr. G. E. K. Aikins. However, Mr. Aikins rejected Azu-Crabbe's offer to step down.

According to a Radio Ghana news bulletin, Azu-Crabbe, in a letter dated 4 January 1983, expressed his concerns to the attorney-general. He was troubled by comments regarding the board's procedures and the presence of security officers at the Hall of Inquiry. As a result, he suggested that the board submit a complete and final report of its investigation as of 21 December 1982, excluding the cross-examination of Mr. Amartey Quaye by Captain Kojo Tsikata’s counsel.

In response, the attorney-general noted that PNDC Law 15, which established the board, required the final report to cover all proceedings. He stressed the paramount importance of justice and truth, insisting that the investigation, which had been publicly initiated by the board, should proceed without changes, especially at such a late stage when the board was nearing the completion of its task. He expressed his desire for the board, as it was currently constituted, to continue its public sittings and fulfil its responsibilities.

=== SIB report ===
The final report of the Special Investigation Board (SIB) on the murder of three judges and a retired army officer concluded that there was no evidence to suggest that the chairman of the PNDC and his wife had prior knowledge of the kidnapping and murder. In fact, the report indicated that when Flt. Lt. Rawlings learnt on 3 July 1982, that the four abducted individuals had been killed, his demeanour visibly changed. Brigadier Joseph Nunoo-Mensah, the former Chief of Defence Staff (CDS), testified before the board that when he saw the PNDC chairman around that time, Rawlings appeared to be completely unaware of the events.

This statement was part of the board's overall evaluation of the evidence and findings, which were released in Accra, along with commentary from the Attorney-General and Secretary for Justice, Mr. G. E. K. Aikins. The SIB recommended that five individuals identified in its interim report should be charged and brought to trial at the High Court, following the preparation of the necessary documents and bill of indictment.

Four of these individuals; Lance Corporals S. K. Amedeka, Michael Senya, Johnny Dzandu, and Tekpor Hekli (alias Tommy Tekpor) were to face two charges of conspiracy to commit murder, while Joachim Amartey Quaye was to be charged with conspiracy to commit murder.

At a press conference in Accra, where he officially released the 55-page SIB report and his own 26-page commentary on it, Mr. G. E. K. Aikins stated that he could not, "in justice and good conscience," initiate criminal proceedings against five other individuals against whom the board had made adverse findings. These individuals included Lance Corporals Gordon Kwowu, Nsurowuo, Victor Gomelishio, Sgt. Alolga Akata-Pore, and Capt. Kojo Tsikata (rtd.).

Mr. Aikins noted that the evidence against these five was "tenuous," and therefore insufficient to bring them before the court for the murder of the three judges; Mrs. Justice Cecilia Koranteng-Addow, Mr. Justice Frederick Poku Sarkodee, and Mr. Justice Kwadwo Agyei Agyapong and the retired army officer, Major Sam Acquah.

Regarding Capt. Tsikata, whom the board had described as the "mastermind" behind the murders, the attorney-general expressed difficulty in reconciling this characterisation with the detailed evidence presented to the board. This evidence, which the board accepted, showed that Amartey Quaye had made independent preparations for the murders long before he claimed to have been briefed by Capt. Tsikata on 30 June 1982.

During the press briefing, the attorney-general and secretary for justice, announced that he had directed the commissioner of police (CIP) to compile a docket for the prosecution of the five suspects.

== Legal proceedings and verdict ==
The five individuals; Joachim Amartey Quaye, aged 32, Lance Corporal Samuel Kwaku Amedeka, aged 27, Lance Corporal Michael Senya, aged 21, Johnny Dzandu, aged 23, and Evans Tekpor Hekli (alias Tonny Tekpor), aged 24 faced trial before a National Public Tribunal. The tribunal was led by Mr. George Agyekum as the chairperson, with members including Madam Comfort Doe, Staff Sergeant Mumuni Seidu, Mr. Jenkins Kofie, and Lance Corporal Moses Tonka.

The trial, recorded as case number 24/83, commenced on 20 July 1983, at the Old State House in Accra. The tribunal issued its verdict on 15 August 1983, in the case titled The People v. Joachim Amartey Quaye and Four Others. All five defendants, with the exception of Lance Corporal Amedeka who was tried in absentia, were found guilty and sentenced to death by firing squad. Amedeka escaped jail during the 19 June failed coup attempt and fled the country. He has remained a fugitive to this day. Tepkor Hekli was executed on 13 August 1983 due to his involvement in the 19 June failed coup attempt. Two days after his execution, he was found guilty by the tribunal in the murder of the three judges and retired army officer. Amartey Quaye and Johnny Dzandu were executed at the dawn of 17 August 1983 by firing squad at a range near John Teye Memorial School on the Nsawam road. As of the time of press release, the PNDC had not yet confirmed the death sentence for Lance Corporal Michael Senya.

== Aftermath ==
The trial left numerous questions unresolved. Justice Samuel Azu Crabbe, the chairman of the Special Investigation Board (SIB), described the event as "the most outrageous crime in the annals of this country," and its impact continued to resonate. Not long after the trial concluded, the Chief of the Defense Staff, Joseph Nunoo-Mensah, resigned, stating that he could no longer support the goals and methods of Rawlings's leadership.

The case brought to light the PNDC's need to assert control over the military and the police, who had been acting with impunity. To address this, a military tribunal was established to prosecute soldiers and policemen who were terrorising civilians. Additionally, the military underwent a comprehensive reorganisation to restore discipline, which had significantly deteriorated since the general mutiny against the officer corps in 1979. Curfew hours were changed from 10:00 pm – 5:00 am to midnight – 5:00am starting from 24 December 1982.

Captain Kojo Tsikata filed a defamation lawsuit against The Independent on 26 March 1993 after it published the SIB's report alleging that he had "masterminded" the kidnapping and subsequent murders. He later agreed to drop the case after The Independent issued a correction statement in September 1998, clarifying that they had not intended to imply Tsikata's guilt in the crimes.

The burial of the murdered judges was held on 7 July 1982.

In the forecourt of the Supreme Court premises, three busts have been erected in honour of the three High Court Judges as a perpetual memorial of their judicial careers and sacrifice. They are remembered in an annual judicial service on the anniversary of their deaths, called Martyrs Day, in Ghana.
