= J. Kwabena Asamoah-Gyadu =

Ghanaian clergyman and scholar of African Pentecostalism

The Most Rev. Prof. J. Kwabena Asamoah-Gyadu FGA

Academic background
- Education: Trinity Theological Seminary, Legon (Dipl.-Theol.); University of Ghana, Legon (B.A., MPhil); University of Birmingham, (PhD)

Academic work
- Discipline: African Christianity; Charismatic Christianity; Pentecostalism
- Institutions: Trinity Theological Seminary, Legon

Ecclesiastical career
- Church: Methodist Church Ghana
- Offices held: 13th Presiding Bishop, Methodist Church Ghana (2024 – present)

J. Kwabena Asamoah-Gyadu or Johnson Kwabena Asamoah-Gyadu FGA is a Ghanaian scholar of African Pentecostalism and an academic administrator. Professor Asamoah-Gyadu is also a Minister of the Methodist Church Ghana. In 2024, he was elected the thirteenth Presiding Bishop of the Methodist Church Ghana. From 2018 to 2024, he served as the President of the Trinity Theological Seminary, Legon.

== Biography ==
Asamoah-Gyadu received a Certificate in Pastoral Ministry (1986) from the Trinity Theological Seminary, Legon, a BA in Religion and Sociology (1987) and a MPhil in Religion (1994) from the University of Ghana, and a PhD in Theology (2000) from the University of Birmingham. He is an ordained minister of the Methodist Church Ghana and, in 2015, was elected as a Fellow of the Ghana Academy of Arts and Sciences. He has held teaching posts at Trinity Theological Seminary, Legon since 1994, and is currently Baëta-Grau Professor of African Christianity and Pentecostal/Charismatic Theology and President of the seminary from 2018 to 2024.

Asamoah-Gyadu is known for his writings related to African Pentecostal and charismatic Christianity. He has also written a few articles related to digital media and digital religion.

A festschrift has been prepared in his honor, entitled African Pentecostalism and World Christianity (2020).

== Works ==
- Asamoah-Gyadu, J. Kwabena (2005). African Charismatics: Current Developments Within Independent Indigenous Pentecostalism in Ghana. Brill. ISBN 978-90-04-14089-9.
- Asamoah-Gyadu, J. Kwabena (2013). Contemporary Pentecostal Christianity: Interpretations From an African Context. Wipf and Stock Publishers. ISBN 978-1-62032-898-9.
- Asamoah-Gyadu, J. Kwabena (2015). Sighs and Signs of the Spirit: Ghanaian Perspectives on Pentecostalism and Renewal in Africa. Wipf & Stock Publishers. ISBN 978-1-4982-3707-9.
