= Frederick Poku Sarkodee =

Ghanaian High Court judge
- In office 1971–1982

Personal details
- Born: Frederick Poku Sarkodee; 26 August 1927 Koforidua, Gold Coast
- Died: 30 June 1982 (aged 54) Accra, Ghana
- Cause of death: Murder (gunshot wound)
- Buried: Osu Cemetery, Accra, Ghana
- Spouse: Yvonne Sarkodee
- Education: Adisadel College
- Alma mater: Fourah Bay College; Middle Temple
- Occupation: Ghanaian High court judge
- Known for: His work as a Ghanaian High court judge; His abduction and murder together with two other High Court judges and a retired military officer in 1982
- Monuments: Memorial to the Martyrs of the Rule of Law in front of the Supreme Court of Ghana buildings

Fred Poku Sarkodee was a Ghanaian judge and one of the three judges abducted and murdered on 30 June 1982.

== Early life and education ==
Sarkodee was born in Koforidua in the Eastern Region on 26 August 1927. He began his education at the ECM school in Koforidua and continued at Adisadel College in 1943, where he obtained his Ordinary Level certificate (O-Level) in 1948. Following the 1948 strike by various students in Ghana in protest against the arrest of The Big Six, which he had joined, he was dismissed by the school. He continued his education through private studies with the aid of private teachers who had been hired by his father to help him prepare for the Advanced Level examination (A-Level) which he consequently passed. In 1950 he was sent to Fourah Bay College in Sierra Leon for his undergraduate studies and, in 1954, he proceeded to the United Kingdom to study law. In 1959, he was admitted into the society of the Middle Temple where he completed his studies in 1961.

== Career ==
Following his studies in the United Kingdom, Sarkodee returned to Ghana, where he was employed at the office of the Attorney General. In 1966, he became a Senior Attorney and, on 22 May 1971, he became a High Court judge.

As a judge, he was known to have advocated for the cause of women prior to the existence of the 'Intestate Succession Law of 1985 (PNDCL III)', which was enacted to protect a married spouse under customary law. In the case of Abebreseh v Kaah in 1976, Sarkodee argued that a wife who had contributed substantially to the estate of her deceased husband was not to be deprived of the fruit of her labour. He further added that the contributions of the widow to the estate could not be considered as mere assistance, as good conscience would not permit that. Also, in 1973, concerning the case of Addo v Addo, Sarkodee's verdict was that "persistently refusing a young wife sexual intercourse over a long period constituted unreasonable behaviour such that the wife ought not to be called upon to endure it any longer."

== Personal life ==
Sarkodee was married to Mrs. Mrs. Yvonne Sarkodee. Together, they had five children. Sarkodee loved to play golf and tennis.

== Abduction and death ==
Sarkodee together with three others (Justice Cecilia Koranteng-Addow, Justice Kwadwo Agyei Agyapong, and Major Sam Acquah), was abducted during curfew hours (which started at 6pm and ended at 6am) on June 30, 1982. According to the report of the Special Investigation Board appointed by the PNDC, one of the abductors, Johnny Dzandu, told the abducted persons that they were "enemies of the revolution". The abductors were driving in a Fiat Compagnola jeep during curfew hours. The abducted people were later found dead with gun-shot wounds and superficial burns.

== Legacy ==
Following the deaths of the abducted judges and a military man, the country has viewed these abducted judges as martyrs of the rule of law. Their busts were raised on the premises of the forecourt of the Supreme Court of Ghana as a perpetual memorial of their sacrifice.

The note on his bust in the forecourt of the Supreme Court reads;

"Justice Poku Sarkodie will be remembered as the cool, calm, and collected gentleman that the very embodiment of curtesy, hard work, being fair, and firm. He exhibited Judicial taciturnity and versatility. He was committed to his family, work and God. May his good soul rest in peace."
