= Trinity Theological Seminary, Legon =

Protestant seminary in Accra, Ghana

Location
- P. O. Box LG 48, Legon-Accra; Greater Accra Region; Ghana; 5.6537409971070955°N 0.16884803169043808°W

Information
- Type: Co-educational Theological Seminary
- Religious affiliation: Non-denominational Christian
- Denomination: Protestant
- Established: 1942; 84 years ago
- Founder: Methodist Church Ghana; Presbyterian Church of Ghana; Evangelical Presbyterian Church; Anglican Diocese of Accra
- School district: Accra Metropolis
- Oversight: Ghana Education Service
- Principal: J. Kwabena Asamoah-Gyadu
- Campus type: Residential garden-style setting

The Trinity Theological Seminary is a Protestant seminary located on a 70-acre campus in Legon, Accra. As an ecumenical theological tertiary and ministerial training institution, it serves students in Ghana and the West African sub-region. The focus of the curriculum is pedagogy, guidance, counselling, and fieldwork to adequately prepare students for careers in Christian ministry. The school has charter status, offers certificate, diploma, and degree programmes, and is accredited by the National Accreditation Board of the Ghanaian Ministry of Education.

== History ==
The seminary was founded in 1942 under the auspices of three Protestant denominations: Methodist Church Ghana, Presbyterian Church of Ghana and the Evangelical Presbyterian Church. Later on in 1967, the Anglican Diocesan Council of Ghana and the African Methodist Episcopal Zion Church became sponsoring churches as well. Students from non-sponsoring churches such as African Independent Churches, Charismatic and Pentecostal Churches are also permitted to have their clergy trained there. There is also opportunity for global exchange between the seminary students and foreign students and visiting academics from around the world in order to foster cross-cultural engagement. The campus houses a Chapel, the S.G Williamson Library, residences and hostels for seminary students.

Per the Charter, the seminary’s statement of purpose is as follows:

- "To offer Christian training, teaching and guidance.
- To educate men and women for the ordained ministry both within and outside the church.
- To train church workers for continuous personal and professional growth and development.
- To offer professional and academic theological programs to qualified candidates to enable them to use their gifts extensively and intensively both within and outside the church.
- To serve as a theological research center especially for the Clergy and laity."

== Seminary President ==
J.O.Y. Mante served as President from September 2011 to August 2018.

Since 2018, J. Kwabena Asamoah-Gyadu has served as the seminary president.

== Degrees offered ==
The institute offers courses at the undergraduate, master's and doctoral levels.

- Doctor of Philosophy (Ph.D.)
- Doctor of Ministry (D.Min.)
- Master of Arts in Ministry (MAM)
- Master of Divinity (M.Div.)
- Bachelor of Theology (Th.B.)
- Diploma in Theology (Dipl. Theol.)
- Certificate in Ministry
- Certificate in Transformational Urban Leadership

== Notable faculty ==
- Paul Boafo - Twelfth Presiding Bishop, Methodist Church Ghana (2018 – present)
- Livingstone Komla Buama - former Moderator of the General Assembly, Evangelical Presbyterian Church, Ghana (2001 – 2009)
- Nicholas T. Clerk - former Rector, Ghana Institute of Management and Public Administration (GIMPA)
- J.O.Y. Mante - former Moderator of the Presbyterian Church of Ghana (2018 – present)
- Kwabena Opuni Frimpong - former General Secretary, Christian Council of Ghana

== Notable alumni ==
- Seth Senyo Agidi - Moderator of the General Assembly, Evangelical Presbyterian Church, Ghana (2015 – present)
- Francis Amenu - Moderator of the General Assembly, Evangelical Presbyterian Church, Ghana (2009 – 2015)
- Titus Awotwi Pratt - Eleventh Presiding Bishop, Methodist Church Ghana (2015 – 2018)
- Samuel Ayete-Nyampong - Clerk of the General Assembly of the Presbyterian Church of Ghana (2012 – 2019)
- Paul Boafo - Twelfth Presiding Bishop, Methodist Church Ghana (2018 – present)
- Michael A. Bossman - Administrative Bishop, Methodist Church Ghana (2018 – present)
- Livingstone Komla Buama - Moderator of the General Assembly, Evangelical Presbyterian Church, Ghana (2001 – 2009)
- Hilliard Dogbe - Presiding Bishop of the African Methodist Episcopal Zion Church (Western West Africa Episcopal District), and Chairman of the Christian Council of Ghana
- Nicholas T. Clerk - former Rector, Ghana Institute of Management and Public Administration (GIMPA)
- Kwabena Opuni Frimpong - former General Secretary, Christian Council of Ghana
- Kofi Koduah Sarpong - CEO, Ghana National Petroleum Corporation
- Ama Afo Blay - former Director General of the Ghana Education Service.

== See also ==
- Akrofi-Christaller Institute
- Education in Ghana
- Presbyterian College of Education, Akropong
- Presbyterian Women's College of Education
- Salem School, Osu
