= James Kojo Obeng =

Ghanaian politician

Member of the Ghana Parliament for Amansie
- In office 1965–1966
- Preceded by: Constituency split
- Succeeded by: Constituency split

Personal details
- Born: James Kojo Obeng; 28 April 1925 Effiduase, Ashanti Region, Gold Coast
- Party: Convention People's Party
- Education: Wesley College of Education, Kumasi
- Occupation: Politician
- Profession: Teacher

James Kojo Obeng (born 28 April 1925) was a Ghanaian politician and teacher. He was the member of parliament for the Amansie constituency from 1965 to 1966.

== Biography ==
Obeng was born in Effiduase in the Ashanti Region of the Gold Coast (now Ghana). He began his elementary education at the Asokore Methodist Central School in January 1932. He later became a Pupil teacher for two years prior to entering Wesley College of Education, Kumasi in 1944 obtaining his Teachers' Certificate 'A' in 1947.

Obeng went on to teach at the Asokore Methodist Central School for five before transferring to Hwidiem Ahafo Methodist School where he served as headmaster of the school for eight years. He later became a Senior teacher at the Effiduasi Methodist Middle School District.

Obeng was made chairman of the Convention People's Party (CPP) branch of Sekyere East. In June 1965 he was elected member of parliament for the Amansie constituency on the ticket of the CPP. He served in that capacity until 24 February 1966 when the Nkrumah government was overthrown. His hobbies included playing volleyball, gardening and letter writing.

== See also ==
- List of MPs elected in the 1965 Ghanaian parliamentary election
