= N. A. Adjin-Tettey =

Ghanaian athlete (1930–2021)

Nii Ayikai Adjin-Tettey
Personal information
- Nationality: Ghanaian
- Born: July 20, 1930 Jamestown, Accra
- Died: April 23, 2021 (aged 90) Dansoman, Accra

Sport
- Country: Ghana
- Sport: Track and field

Nii Ayikai Adjin-Tettey (20 July 1930 – 23 April 2021) was a Ghanaian athlete and national athletic coach. As an athlete, he became the fastest West African in August 1953. He was Ghana's first trained track coach. As a coach, he was involved in the selection and training of Ghanaian athletes for Olympics, All Africa and Commonwealth Games events participated in by Ghana between 1960 and 1984. He was a past chairman of the Ghana Amateur Athletics Association.

== Early life ==
Nii Ayikai Adjin-Tettey was born in Accra on 20 July 1930. He attended Government Boys School in Kumasi and the Gold Coast National School in Accra for his basic education, developing an early interest in athletics at these schools. In 1948, he entered Accra Academy for his secondary education and competed in athletic competitions whilst there. In 1950, he derived the school's slogan Bleoo in response to taunts in a train prior to the elite second-cycle Aggrey Shield Competition in which the school won for the first time and was a member of a group of athletes who successfully defended the school's win the year afterwards.

In 1952, he entered Wesley College, Kumasi and became the fastest West African when he set the record for 100 yards at 9.7 seconds in August 1953. A record which stood for ten years. That same year, he represented and won a gold medal for the Gold Coast as part of the 4x100 metres relay team during the third Ghana-Nigeria meet at Surulere in Nigeria. In 1957, he was selected by sporting authorities for an overseas training scholarship at the German Sport University Cologne.

== Coaching career ==
In 1960, he completed the course and that same year returned to be assigned a role in athletic coaching and scouting as Western Regional Sports Organiser. He trained the Ghanaian team for the 1965 All-Africa Games in Congo-Brazzaville where his athletes Rose Hart and Alice Annum won medals. In 1966, he was appointed National Athletic Coach and made acting Chief Administrative Officer of the Central Organisation of Sports. The Central Organisation of Sports changed to be known as the National Sports Council soon after this. He was selected thrice to be Chief Coach of an All African select contingent to compete in athletics against the United States in 1971, 1973 and 1975. Some of his athletics talents unearthed include Mike Ahey, Stan Allotey, BK Mends, Alice Annum and Joshua Owusu.

In 1974, Adjin-Tettey drew up and executed a programme for the University of Ghana to host the first All-Africa Inter-University Games. Adjin-Tettey also acted as Sports Consultant to the Ghana Police Service beginning in 1975 and helped the Service host the Security Services Sports Association (SESSA) Games. In 1984, he was removed as an official of the National Sports Council on events connected to the 1984 Los Angeles Olympics. That same year he was a co-foundation member and the first Chairman of the Dansoman Keep-Fit Club which is known for being the organiser of the Accra Milo Marathon since 1987.

== Personal life ==
In 1962, he married Millicent Odoley Mensah. He had four (4) children, Gizela Naa Ayikailey, Erika Naa Ayikaikor, Manfred Tetteh and Maureen Naa Ayikaikai.

== Honours ==
He was made president of the Old Sportsmen and Sportswomen Association. In 2013, sixty years after he set the national and west African record at the field of Wesley College, Kumasi, the field was named the Adjin-Tettey Field by the school's administration.
