= Ama Afo Blay =

Ghanaian educationist

Director General of the Ghana Education Service

Personal details
- Born: 1943 or 1944 (age 81–82)
- Education: University of Cape Coast (B.Ed.); Trinity Theological Seminary; Emporia State University (MS)

Ama Afo Blay (born 1943 or 1944) is a Ghanaian educationist. She is a former Director General of the Ghana Education Service. She was appointed into office in 2002 by John Kufuor. She currently serves as the chairperson of the News Times Corporation, a state-owned print and online media company.

== Early life and education ==
Blay holds a bachelor's degree in General Education from the University of Cape Coast and a certificate from the Trinity Theological Seminary in Accra. She has also obtained a master's degree in Guidance and Counselling from the Emporia State University in Kansas, United States of America.

== Career ==
Before she was appointed the Director General of GES on December 11, 2002, she served as the Eastern Regional director of GES.

She later served as the board chair of the New Times Corporation, a Ghanaian state-run media outlet.
