= Assin Nsuta =

- Town
- Country: Ghana
- Region: Central Region

Assin Nsuta is a town in the Central Region. The town is known for the Assin Nsuta Secondary School. The school is a second cycle institution.
