= Paul Afoko =

Ghanaian politician and businessman

Paul Afoko (born on 31st August, 1954) is Ghanaian politician and businessman.

== Family and early life ==
Paul Afoko was born on 31 August 1954. He is from the royal family of Sandema in the Upper East Region of Ghana, therefore a Builsa. Afoko studied at the Bawku Secondary school, Navrongo Senior High School and the London School of Economics.

== Politics ==
Afoko agitated against the union government idea during the regime of General Ignatius Kutu Acheampong in the 1970s as well as against the overthrow of Dr. Hilla Limann by J.J. Rawlings in the 1980s. He was jailed by the PNDC for his agitations but managed to escape to the United Kingdom where he stayed in exile for a number of years before returning to Ghana in 2000.

He contested and won the contest for New Patriotic Party chairmanship on 12 April 2014 at a party congress held in Tamale, Ghana's northern regional capital.

=== Suspension ===
During his tenure as Chairman for the New Patriotic Party, Afoko was suspended by the party after some party members petitioned the disciplinary committee of the party. His suspension came in October 2015, roughly a year after he was elected in the past year, 2014. Mr. Afoko disputed both the basis and the legality of the suspension and has taken the issue to court. Subsequent to his suspension, the party's general secretary, Kwabena Agyapong, as well as one vice chairman, Sammy Crabbe, were also suspended through a similar process. Afoko and Crabbe filed processes in the court disputing their suspensions.

As the NPP re-organizes the party, Paul Afoko re-launched his bid to run for the party's chairmanship position.

=== Unsuspend ===
Afoko suspension was lifted and he returned fully to party activities. He has since declared his bid to contest for the party's chairmanship again. Speaking on campaign launch for the chairmanship bid he admitted he was hurt by his suspension from the party but has since forgiven everyone who orchestrated it.

=== Appeal to party ===
Paul Afoko has called on the NPP rank and file to uphold peace and unity towards their journey to return to power. He has urged them to put their differences aside, unite, and rebuild the party to recapture power in 2028.

"If we don't unite, there's no power. Power wants unity, power doesn't like division" , he says.

During his remarks, he outlined his strategy to recapture power for the party when he's elected as the next chairman. He revealed what he called, the "Three Rs" agenda. Which implies, Reunite, Rebuild, and Recapture.

== Personal life ==
He is married with four children. He is also a businessman.
