= Methodist University College Ghana =

Private university in Ghana

Methodist University Ghana
- Motto: Excellence Morality Service
- Type: Private
- Established: October 2000
- Academic affiliations: University of Ghana
- Vice-Chancellor: Professor Philip Ebow Bondzi-Simpson
- Students: 4000
- Location: Methodist University Ghana, P.O. Box DC 940, Dansoman, Accra, Accra, Greater Accra Region, Ghana; 5°33′58″N 0°15′41″W
- Campus: Urban area Dansoman-Accra Tema Wenchi
Colours
Black, True blue, white and Electric crimson
- Website: www.mug.edu.gh

The Methodist University Ghana (MUCG) is a private university in Ghana. It is located at Accra in the Greater Accra Region. It was established in October 2000 by the Methodist Church Ghana after being granted accreditation by the National Accreditation Board in August 2000. Academic work started in November 2000 at the Wesley Grammar School campus. MUCG offers a wide range of undergraduate and postgraduate programs across various disciplines.

== History ==
At its 37th Annual Conference in Sunyani in 1998, the Methodist Church resolved to establish a Methodist University College. Following thorough preparations and procedures, the Methodist University College Ghana (MUCG) received accreditation from the National Accreditation Board (NAB) in August 2000. Approval for its affiliation with the University of Ghana was granted in October 2002.

Academic activities commenced at MUCG in October 2000. The initial group of students began attending lectures in November 2000, followed by the second group in October 2001. The university was established with the aim of providing quality tertiary education grounded in Christian principles and values. Since its inception, MUCG has played a significant role in expanding access to higher education and fostering academic excellence in Ghana.

== Organization ==
The university has five faculties. Each is made up of departments which report to their respective deans.

=== Faculty of Business Administration ===
- Accounting Department
- Banking and Finance Department
- Human Resource Management and Management Studies Department
- Marketing and Supply chain Department

=== Faculty of Arts and General Studies ===
- Languages Department
- General Studies Department
- Religious Studies Department
- Music and Theatre Studies Department

=== Faculty of Social Studies ===
- Economics Department
- Psychology Department
- Social Work Department

=== Faculty of Informatics and Mathematical Sciences ===
- Information Technology Department
- Mathematics and Statistics Departments
- Actuarial Science

=== Faculty of Applied Sciences ===
- General Agriculture and Agribusiness Department.
- Agroprocessing Department
- Nursing Department.

== Campuses ==
There are three campuses.

- Dansoman Campus: This is the main campus of the university, in an Accra suburb.
- Tema Campus: Satellite campus on the premises of the Tema Methodist Day Secondary School.
- Wenchi Campus: B.Sc. General Agriculture, Diploma in General Nursing, Certificate programmes in Agrobusiness, Agro-processing and Horticulture are run from this campus.

== Affiliation ==
The university was officially affiliated to the University of Ghana since October 2002.

However, on Tuesday, August 30, 2022, the university was granted a presidential charter to award its own degrees.

== See also ==
- List of universities in Ghana
