= Kwadwo Agyei Agyapong =

Ghanaian judge (1926–1982)

High Court judge
- In office 1977–1982

Personal details
- Born: Kwadwo Agyei Agyapong; November 1926; Oyoko, Ashanti Region, Gold Coast
- Died: 30 June 1982 (aged 55); Accra, Ghana
- Cause of death: Murder (gunshot wound)
- Buried: Osu Cemetery, Accra, Ghana
- Spouse: Comfort Agyapong
- Children: 10 including Kwabena Agyapong
- Education: Mfantsipim School
- Alma mater: Wesley College of Education, Kumasi; King's College, London; Inner Temple
- Occupation: Ghanaian High court judge
- Known for: His work as a Ghanaian High court judge; His abduction and murder together with two other High Court judges and a retired military officer in 1982
- Monuments: Memorial to the Martyrs of the Rule of Law in front of the Supreme Court of Ghana buildings

Kwadwo Agyei Agyapong was a Ghanaian judge and one of the three judges murdered following their abduction on 30 June 1982.

== Early life and education ==
Born in Oyoko in the Ashanti Region in November 1926. Agyapong's early education began at the Asokore Local Authority Methodist Primary School and the Sekondi Methodist Church School. In 1942, he earned a scholarship to study at Mfantsipim School, Cape Coast, for his secondary education. After obtaining his Cambridge school certificate in 1946, he entered Wesley College where he was awarded his grade A Teachers' Certificate. In 1954, Agyapong gained a Cocobod scholarship to study at King's College, a constituent college of the University of London. There he studied law and obtained his Bachelor of Laws degree in 1958. He was called to the English bar at the Inner Temple in February 1960.

== Career ==
Following his studies at Wesley College, Agyapong returned to Mfantsipim School to teach. Amongst his students at the time were Joseph W.S. de Graft-Johnson (former Vice-President of Ghana) and Isaac Kobina Abban (former Chief Justice of Ghana). He also had teaching stints at the Ghana National College, the Accra Academy, and Accra High School.

After completing his legal studies in the United Kingdom, Agyapong returned to Ghana in 1961 to begin private legal practice. He later founded a law firm together with his friend, Kwabena Adu-Tutu Amankwah at Adum in Kumasi.

Following recommendations from the presiding judge of the Ashanti Region and the Ghana Judicial Council, Agyapong was made a justice of the High Court in 1977. In 1980, he made history by being the only High Court judge to sit on the then transitional Supreme Court bench in the hearing of the historical constitutional case between the then People's National Party (PNP) government and Dr. Kwame Amoako Tuffuor.

In May 1979, he was appointed chairman of the Committee of Enquiry that investigated the case of the Accra Railway shooting incident that saw the death of a second-year student of Commonwealth Hall, University of Ghana by a police constable. In his report in June 1980, he lamented the unwarranted use of ammunition by the police in a rather peaceful students' demonstration.

== Personal life ==
Agyapong was married to Mrs. Comfort Agyapong. His last child was three months old at the time of his abduction. He was the father of Kwabena Agyapong, the former secretary of the New Patriotic Party.

== Abduction and death ==
Agyapong was one of the four people (together with Justice Fred Poku Sarkodee, Justice Cecilia Koranteng-Addow, and Major Sam Acquah) that were abducted during curfew hours (which started at 6pm and ended at 6am) on June 30, 1982. Their abductors were later identified as soldiers who were in plain clothes at the time of the abduction. According to the report of the Special Investigation Board appointed by the PNDC, one of the abductors, Johnny Dzandu, told the abducted persons that they (the abducted people) were "enemies of the revolution". The abductors were driving in a Fiat Compagnola jeep during curfew hours. The abducted people were later found dead with gun-shot wounds and superficial burns.

== Legacy ==
Agyapong, like his three compatriots, had their lives and careers abruptly ended by their untimely deaths on June 30, 1982. In the forecourt of the Supreme Court premises, three busts have been erected in honour of the three High Court Judges as a perpetual memorial of their judicial careers and sacrifice. On Justice Agyapong's bust are inscribed the following words:

"Justice Agyapong will be remembered for his simple and unassuming manner. His prodigious capacity and love for Judicial work and his abhorrence for violence. He was a committed father, husband and judge. May the soul of justice Agyei Kwadwo Agyapong rest in peace."
