= Isaac Sesi =

Ghanaian entrepreneur

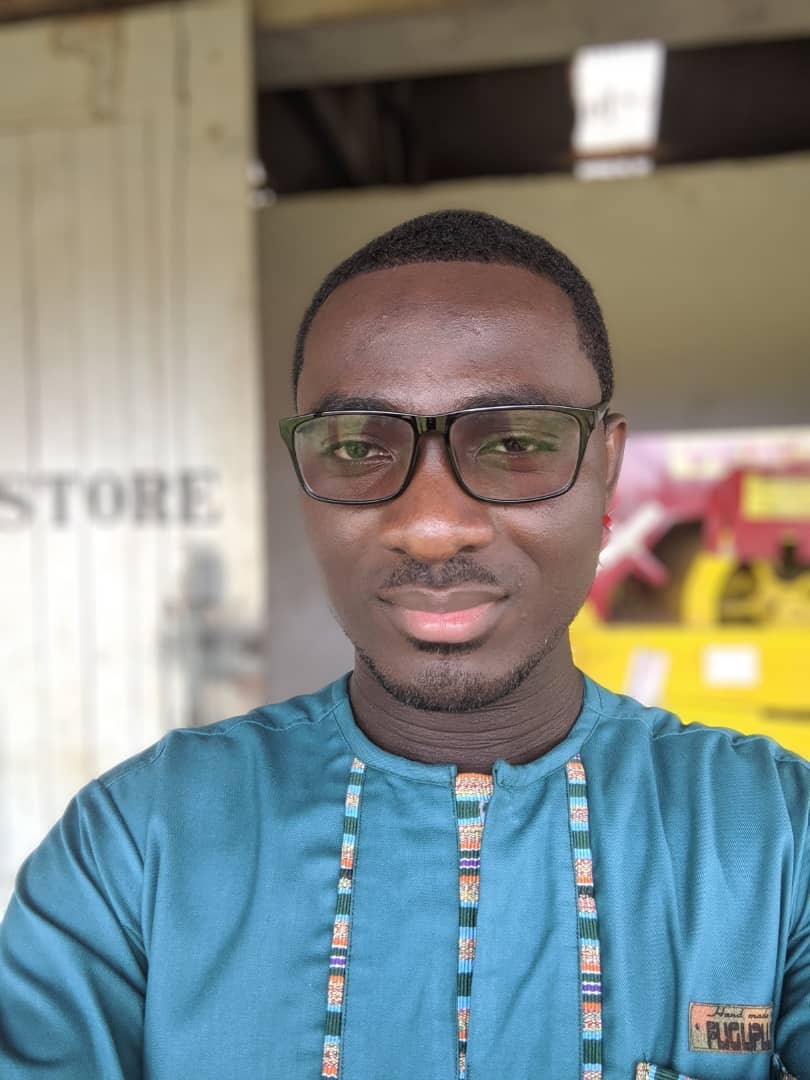
- Isaac Sesi at the Africa Prize for Engineering Innovation by the Royal Academy of Engineering.
- Born: Isaac Sesi
- Education: Kwame Nkrumah University of Science and Technology
- Alma mater: Mfantsipim School

Isaac Sesi is a Ghanaian entrepreneur, engineer, and the founder of Sesi Technologies, a Ghanaian company that solves agricultural and food challenges. He is known for his development of a moisture meter to help sub-Saharan African farmers reduce post-harvest losses

== Education ==
Sesi is a graduate of the Kwame Nkrumah University of Science and Technology (KNUST) where he studied electrical engineering. He completed his senior high school education at Mfantsipim School, where he studied general science.

== Career and life ==
Sesi is known for developing a moisture metre known as GrainMate. This device allows farmers and grain traders to measure moisture levels of maize, wheat, millet, and other staple. He is also known to have developed FarmSense, a soil sensing solution for smallholder farmers which made it to the Global Innovation through Science and Technology (GIST) Tech-I Global Pitch competition semifinals. His first company was Invent Electronic Company Limited, started in 2014, Which retails electronic components online.

In 2015, he cofounded Wires & Bytes with other three friends to develop web apps and software-as-a-service applications. In 2016 they developed Pasco, an educational app for university students

The following year he co-founded 2eweboys, a creative writing agency. In 2017, Sesi, then a research engineer at the Department of Agricultural and Biosystems Engineering of the Kwame Nkrumah University of Science and Technology and Dr Paul Armstrong, a researcher at the United States Department of Agriculture, worked together on a Feed the Future Innovation Lab for the Reduction of Post Harvest Losses Project in partnership with Kansas State University to develop a low-cost moisture meter. The moisture meter was launched at a ceremony in KNUST

Since 2018, he has collaborated with different organisations including World Food Programme Ghana, and the Assisting the Management of Poultry and Layer Industries with Feed Improvements and Efficiency Strategies (AMPLIFIES) Ghana Project which is a food for progress program of the U.S Department of Agriculture (USDA) to run post-harvest loss trainings for farmers across Ghana.

== Achievements ==
- GrainMate has won the GIST Tech-I 2019 and the Empowering People Award.
- Tony Elumelu 2018 Entrepreneurship Programme
- Named MIT Technology Review 2019 innovator under 35.
- Pasco App won Gold in the Freelance Education category of the MTN Apps Challenge Version 4.0 in 2017
- NextEinstein finalist
- World Summit Awards national winner
- GrainMate was placed second in the IDEA category during the Global Entrepreneurship Summit in Bahrain and he was awarded as one of the three winners in the American Society of Mechanical Engineers IShow Kenya Competition.
- Winner of the GoGettaz Agripreneur Prize receiving $50,000 to pursue career in agri-food.
- Africa Prize for Engineering Innovation by the Royal Academy of Engineering
