= Kwabena Agyapong =

Ghanaian politician (born 1962)

Kwabena Agyei Agyapong (born 6 March 1962) is a Ghanaian civil engineer and politician.

== Early life ==
Agyapong was born on 6 March 1962, in Kumasi, Capital of the Ashanti Region of Ghana. He was the son of Justice Kwadwo Agyei Agyepong, one of three Ghanaian judges who was abducted and murdered during the early years of Ghana's Provisional National Defence Council. (PNDC). He had his secondary school education at Mfantsipim School.

== Life in politics ==
Agyapong belongs to the New Patriotic Party of Ghana. He became active in Ghanaian politics when Ghana reentered constitutional rule after over a decade of Military rule. He played roles in the campaigns of NPP Presidential Candidates Albert Adu Boahen in 1992, John Kufuor in 1996. He also played a role in Nana Akufo-Addo's campaign to win the presidential nomination in 1998 but subsequently played a role in the overall party effort during the 2000 General election which was won by John Kufuor. He was involved in this again in the year 2004.

He served as the Press Secretary to the President of Ghana John Kufuor from 2001 to 2006. Kwabena Agyapong was one of 17 aspirants who contested for the party's nomination to replace John Agyekum Kuffuor as presidential candidate for the 2008 Ghanaian General Election, In 2014, Kwabena Agyapong stood for the position of General Secretary for the Party and won. However, he and the party's chairman, Paul Afoko faced a lot of resistance in trying to do their duties.

Kwabena Agyapong and one Vice Chairman of the party, Sammy Crabbe were suspended by the party from their positions after receipt of petitions from some members of the party. This was after the Chairman of the party had also been suspended earlier on through a similar process. Afoko and Crabbe had hinted of mounting legal challenges against their suspensions which they claim were done illegally.,

== Presidential ambition ==
In July 2025, Agyepong declared his intention to run for the flagbearer of the NPP in the 2028 General Elections. In August of the same year, he picked nominations form to formally enter into the race to lead the New Patriotic Party in the 2028 General Elections, placing 5th on the balloting.

== Controversy ==
After having won their elections together with others, Kwabena Agyapong and the Party's Chairmanship, Paul Afoko faced a lot of resistance. Things came to a head when a party meeting was called when Afoko was out of Ghana and Agyapong was in Kumasi. Later, the two went around the country to meet party officials but were chased away by some party supporters and had to be saved by the police. The Party Chairman of the region, Adam Mahama justified the attack on the two but later apologized. In the night of 20 May 2015, Adam Mahama was attacked by assailants who poured acid on him. He died in the hospital on 21 May 2015. Prior to his death, Adam Mahama was alleged to have mentioned that Paul Afoko's brother, Gregory was one of those who assaulted and poured acid on him. The Police subsequently arrested Gregory, investigated and presented him before the courts. Calls for Paul Afoko and Agyapong to be pushed out of the party, which started before the murder however continued to grow.

After several methods to get them out of the party failed, petitions were made by some members of the party to the disciplinary committee of the party, which recommended Afoko's suspension. Afoko was suspended though he disputed the legality of the suspension. Later on the same method was used to suspend Kwabena Agyapong as well as one Vice Chairman of the party, Sammy Crabbe.

== Personal life ==
He attended the Mfantsipim School in Cape Coast and obtained a BSc Degree in Civil Engineering from the Kwame Nkrumah University of Science and Technology in Kumasi. Kwabena Ayepong for a long period of time hosted sports programmes on Ghana's State Television Station owned by the Ghana Broadcasting Corporation.

Agyapong worked for a long time with the Ghana Highway Authority. He also owns a civil engineering firm, Constro Consult Limited. Kwabena Agyapong is married to Lawrencia Agyapong and has three children.
