= Abe Ankumah =

Ghanaian-American technology executive and entrepreneur

- Born: 1978 (age 47–48); Accra, Ghana
- Education: California Institute of Technology (BS); Harvard Business School (MBA)
- Occupation: Chief Product Officer
- Employer: 1Password
- Known for: Co-founder and CEO of Nyansa
- Title: Chief Product Officer, 1Password
- Spouse: Jackie Ankumah (m. 2008)
- Children: 2

Abe Ankumah (born 1978) is a Ghanaian-American technology executive and entrepreneur. He has held many roles including recently as the Chief Product Officer at 1Password. He is best known as the co-founder and Chief Executive Officer of Nyansa, a network analytics company acquired by VMware in 2020. His career and leadership style have been profiled in major publications including The New York Times and CNBC.

== Early life and education ==
Ankumah was born in 1978 in Accra, Ghana, the youngest of five children. His parents were entrepreneurs who established the first travel agency in Ghana. He attended Mfantsipim School, a historic all-boys boarding secondary school in Cape Coast. He distinguished himself academically, ranking second nationwide in the Senior Secondary School Certificate Examination (SSSCE).

Following high school, Ankumah intended to enroll in a university in Ghana, but widespread strikes in the university system prompted him to apply to institutions abroad. He moved to the United States to attend the California Institute of Technology (Caltech). Despite having never used a computer prior to his arrival at Caltech, he earned a Bachelor of Science degree in Electrical Engineering and Computer Science. He later obtained a Master of Business Administration (MBA) from Harvard Business School.

== Career ==
=== Early career ===
Ankumah began his career as a research engineer at NASA's Jet Propulsion Laboratory (JPL). He subsequently joined the founding engineering team of Fulcrum Microsystems, a fabless semiconductor company focused on low-latency Ethernet switching. He helped develop the company's core technology before it was acquired by Intel in 2011.

Following business school, Ankumah joined Aruba Networks, where he worked in the Office of the CEO. He later served as the Director of Client Products and Alliances at Meraki, spearheading product initiatives prior to the company's acquisition by Cisco Systems in 2012.

=== Nyansa ===
In September 2013, Ankumah co-founded Nyansa with Anand Srinivas and Daniel Kan. As CEO, Ankumah led the company in developing "Voyance," a vendor-agnostic AIOps platform. Under his leadership, the company raised over $15 million in capital from investors including Intel Capital and Formation 8.

The company's growth and technology attracted the attention of VMware, which acquired Nyansa in February 2020 to bolster its SD-WAN and edge network analytics capabilities.

=== VMware and 1Password ===
Post-acquisition, Ankumah served as Vice President and General Manager at VMware, overseeing the VeloCloud SD-WAN and SASE (Secure Access Service Edge) business. In March 2025, he was appointed as the Chief Product Officer of 1Password, where he leads product strategy for enterprise security and artificial intelligence.

== Patents ==
Ankumah is a listed inventor on several US patents related to network analytics:

- US 11374812, Anand Srinivas, Richard Barry, Abraham Ankumah, Daniel Kan, "System and method for observing and controlling a programmable network via higher layer attributes", published 2022-06-28
- US 10601691, Anand Srinivas, Richard Barry, Abraham Ankumah, Daniel Kan, "System and method for using real-time packet data to detect and manage network issues", published 2020-03-24

== Personal life ==
Ankumah resides in the San Francisco Bay Area with his wife, Jackie Ankumah, and their two children. He serves on the Board of Trustees for the Ashesi University Foundation.
