= Radio 1 (Ghana) =

Accra; Ghana
- Broadcast area: Greater Accra Region

Programming
- Languages: English, French, Akan, Dagbani, Ewe, Ga, Hausa and Nzema
- Format: Local news, talk and music

Ownership
- Owner: Ghana Broadcasting Corporation

Links
- Website: www.gbcghanaonline.com

Radio 1 is a public radio station in Accra, the capital town of the Greater Accra Region of Ghana. The station is owned and run by the state broadcaster - the Ghana Broadcasting Corporation (GBC). The station is one of two national stations run by GBC. The station broadcasts in English and other Ghanaian languages including Akan, Dagbani, Ewe, Ga, Hausa and Nzema.
