= Lynn Schofield Clark =

American media critic and scholar

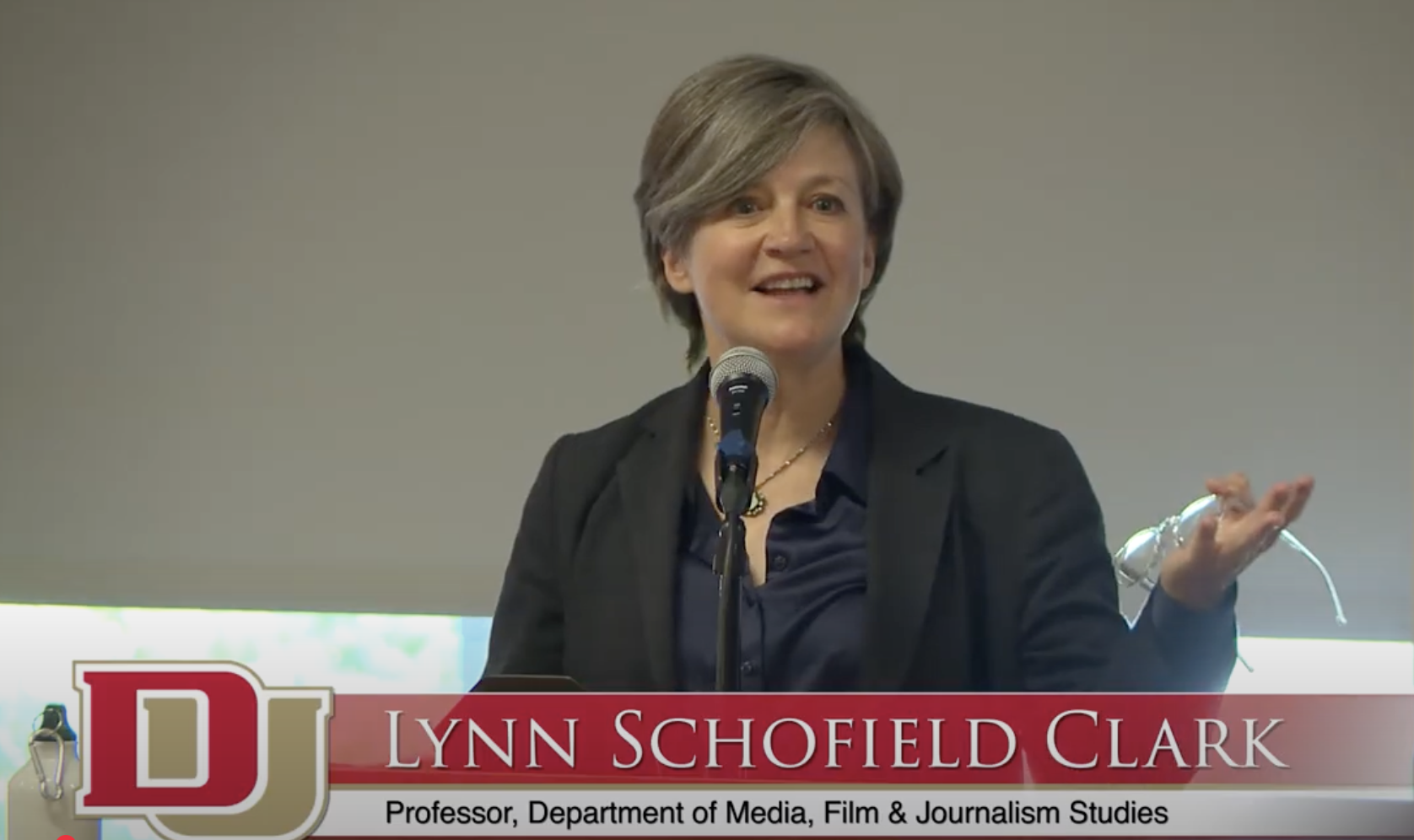
Lynn Schofield Clark introducing the research of the University of Denver's Estlow Research Center.

Lynn Schofield Clark is an American media critic and scholar whose research focuses on media studies and film studies. She is Distinguished Professor in the Department of Media, Film, and Journalism Studies at the University of Denver. She is the author of several books and articles on the role social and visual media play in the lives of diverse U.S. adolescents. In her 2017 book co-authored with Regina Marchi, Young People and the Future of News, Clark and Marchi utilize an ethnographic approach to tell the stories of how young people engage with social media and legacy media both as producers and consumers of news. The book received the 2018 Nancy Baym Book Award from the Association of Internet Researchers and the 2018 James Carey Media Research Award from the Carl Couch Center for Social and Internet Research. Clark's book regarding parenting in the digital age is titled The Parent App: Understanding Families in a Digital Age (Oxford University Press, 2012). Clark’s main contributions are in the areas of family media studies, media rich youth participatory action research and the mediatization (media) of world religions.

Clark’s work is interdisciplinary, drawing on a variety of scholarly disciplines in the humanities and social sciences. She received the University of Denver´s highest honor of Distinguished Professor in 2022, and was inaugurated into the 2025 Class of Fellows of the International Communication Association. She has published in the areas of media studies, sociology, religious studies, theology, and American studies. She is also Director of the Edward W. Estlow International Center for Journalism and New Media at the University of Denver. She served as President of the international academic organization the Association of Internet Researchers and chaired the Denver host committee for the AoIR 2013 meeting. She also served as President of the International Society for Media, Religion, and Culture and was co-director of the first International Conference on Religion, Media, and Culture in 1996. She was a member of the academic advisory board for the Pew Internet & American Life project at its founding at the Pew Research Center. Clark has been recognized for her innovative teaching and was named the 2012 Service Learning Faculty of the Year at the University of Denver. She oversaw a class parody production of the popular television show The Office, which highlighted the discrepancy between how students and faculty members view the use of technology in higher education, a video that went viral.

== Biography ==
Clark grew up outside of Buffalo, New York and attended Williamsville North High School. She received her BA from Westminster College in 1986, her MA from United Theological Seminary in Dayton, Ohio in 1990, and her PhD from the University of Colorado at Boulder in 1998. As a graduate student and postdoctoral fellow at University of Colorado she worked and published with Stewart Hoover. Before joining the University of Denver faculty in 2006, she served as Assistant Research Professor and Associate Director of the Center for Media, Religion, and Culture at the University of Colorado at Boulder. She has served as a visiting professor at the University of Copenhagen’s Department of Media and Film Studies during the springs of 2009 and 2013, as a Visiting Fellow at the RMIT University (AUS) Digital Ethnography Research Center in the Fall of 2013, and as a Research Fellow at the Department of Media and Communication Studies at Södertörn University (Stockholm) in Spring 2022.

She is married to filmmaker Jon Clark, and they have two children.

== Works ==
Based on a 10 year study of hundreds of parents and children, The Parent App (Oxford University Press, 2012), offers parenting strategies for navigating digital and mobile media. Following her interviews with mothers and fathers of varying economic backgrounds, Clark points to different approaches to technological use and its valuation between upper- and lower-income families. Other issues addressed include family communication, privacy and surveillance, online predators, cyber bullying, sexting, gamer drop-outs, helicopter parenting, and the effectiveness of strict controls.

Clark’s first book, From Angels to Aliens: Teenagers, the Media, and the Supernatural (Oxford University Press, 2003), analyzed how young people of different religious backgrounds - and with no religious backgrounds at all - made meaning of popular culture’s representations of the supernatural, based on their religious understanding. She introduced the term “the dark side of evangelicalism” to draw attention to the ways that popular culture such as horror films and apocalyptic video games draw upon Christianity’s historic narratives of demons, hell, and the afterlife, often in ways leaders of religious conservative movements reject in spite of the perennial interest these stories garner among young people. Basing her findings on the differing ways in which young people respond to popular cultural stories of the supernatural, Clark argued against the media effects perspective. Instead of people taking media alternatives more seriously than those of religion, popular media narratives reflect and contribute to ongoing challenges to traditional religious authority as lived out in everyday life. The book received the Best Scholarly Book Award of 2003 by the National Communication Association’s Ethnography division. As the first book on contemporary lived religion in the U.S. that explored the role of popular culture in young peoples’ lives, the book was reviewed in Washington Post Book World, Publishers Weekly, Christianity Today, Christian Century, and in several academic journals.

Clark is also co-author of Media, Home, and Family (Routledge, 2004). This book contributed to family media studies through its focus on the discursive practices of parents. The book introduced the phrase the “accounts of the media” to describe the fact that parents both give stories or accounts about how they wish their family set and followed rules governing media use, and how these stories are always inflected by parents’ senses that they are accountable as parents for establishing and following through on such rules.

Clark is also editor of Religion, Media, and the Marketplace (Rutgers, 2007). In that book, she introduced the concept of “religious lifestyle branding” as a means of discussing the products produced for religiously affiliated young people (such as Hindu nation-sponsored campus bhangra parties, Muslim pop music, KewlJu t-shirts, and fashion magazine-like Bibles) that are meant to give young people a way to identify themselves religiously. Articulating an approach consistent with cultural studies, Clark and contributors point out that such processes of identification are never divorced from sources of power – sometimes at the level of the commercial industries, sometimes at the level of the nation-state – that would benefit from those identifications.

Clark is also second editor (with Professors Erika Polson and Radhika Gajjala) of The Routledge Companion to Media and Class (Routledge Press, 2021) co-editor of Practicing Religion in the Age of the Media (Columbia University Press, 2002), and has had articles appear in the Journal of Communication, Critical Studies in Media Communication, New Media & Society, Journal for the Scientific Study of Religion, Youth & Society, and in several other journals and edited volumes.

== Theoretical contributions ==
Clark’s main contributions are in the area of family media studies (particularly in ethnographic approaches to the role of media in the relationships between U.S. parents and their teenage and preteen children), methodologies that center youth voice and community-engaged research in media studies, and the mediatization (media) of world religions. Clark is recognized for advocating parental trust and open communication between parents and teenagers. She is a member of several international research collaborations including the mobile socialities network based at Lund University, the Youth, News, and Digital Citizenship network at Universidade Lusofona in Portugal, and the Mapping Impactful Media Literacy Group.
