= East African Court of Appeal =

The East African Court of Appeal (EACA) was a court which served as the appellate court for the British colonies in eastern Africa and west Asia.

The court was established in 1902 as the Eastern African Court of Appeal and was the appellate court for British Kenya, Uganda Protectorate, and Nyasaland. Later, the court's name was changed to the East African Court of Appeal, and in the 1950s to the Court of Appeal for East Africa or the Court of Appeal for Eastern Africa. The court was based in Kenya.

Over time, the jurisdiction of the court grew to become the appellate court for the Sultanate of Zanzibar, Tanganyika, British Somaliland, Aden Protectorate, Colony of Aden, Federation of South Arabia, Protectorate of South Arabia, British Mauritius, British Seychelles, and Saint Helena.

Decisions of the court could be appealed with leave to the Judicial Committee of the Privy Council.

The court was retained by independent Kenya, Tanzania, and Uganda as the appellate court for the East African Community.

When the original East African Community was abolished in 1977, so too was the court.

== See also ==
- West African Court of Appeal
