= Sefwi-Bekwai =

Coordinates: 6°12′N 2°19′W

Sefwi Bekwai
- Interactive map of Sefwi Bekwai
- Country: Ghana
- Region: Western North Region
- District: Bibiani Anhwiaso Bekwai District

Government
  - Omanhene of sefwi-bekwai: Oyeadieyie Basape Kojo Armah III
- Time zone: GMT
  - Summer (DST): GMT

Sefwi Bekwai is a town in Bibiani Anhwiaso Bekwai District in the Western North Region of Ghana.

It is one of three autonomous historical states, along with Sefwi Wiawso and Sefwi-Anhwiaso, which make up the Kingdom of Sefwi with each state governed by its own paramount chief (Omanhene) while sharing a common language, religious tradition, and festival system.

== Climate ==
Climate data for Sefwi Bekwai (1991–2020)
Month	Jan	Feb	Mar	Apr	May	Jun	Jul	Aug	Sep	Oct	Nov	Dec	Year
Record high °C (°F)	37.6 (99.7)	39.5 (103.1)	39.7 (103.5)	38.0 (100.4)	36.7 (98.1)	35.3 (95.5)	33.8 (92.8)	34.5 (94.1)	34.0 (93.2)	35.0 (95.0)	36.0 (96.8)	35.7 (96.3)	39.7 (103.5)
Mean daily maximum °C (°F)	33.9 (93.0)	35.6 (96.1)	35.1 (95.2)	34.5 (94.1)	33.6 (92.5)	31.9 (89.4)	30.5 (86.9)	29.9 (85.8)	31.0 (87.8)	32.3 (90.1)	33.2 (91.8)	33.0 (91.4)	32.9 (91.2)
Daily mean °C (°F)	27.8 (82.0)	29.5 (85.1)	29.3 (84.7)	29.0 (84.2)	28.5 (83.3)	27.4 (81.3)	26.5 (79.7)	26.1 (79.0)	26.9 (80.4)	27.6 (81.7)	28.1 (82.6)	27.7 (81.9)	27.9 (82.2)
Mean daily minimum °C (°F)	21.6 (70.9)	23.4 (74.1)	23.5 (74.3)	23.5 (74.3)	23.4 (74.1)	23.0 (73.4)	22.6 (72.7)	22.4 (72.3)	22.8 (73.0)	22.9 (73.2)	22.9 (73.2)	22.5 (72.5)	22.9 (73.2)
Record low °C (°F)	13.4 (56.1)	14.4 (57.9)	18.1 (64.6)	19.2 (66.6)	19.9 (67.8)	18.6 (65.5)	18.5 (65.3)	18.5 (65.3)	19.9 (67.8)	19.5 (67.1)	19.3 (66.7)	13.6 (56.5)	13.4 (56.1)
Average precipitation mm (inches)	19.7 (0.78)	56.5 (2.22)	129.1 (5.08)	161.1 (6.34)	187.0 (7.36)	218.2 (8.59)	130.9 (5.15)	79.5 (3.13)	148.3 (5.84)	189.8 (7.47)	94.4 (3.72)	32.5 (1.28)	1,447 (56.96)
Average precipitation days (≥ 1.0 mm)	1.5	3.6	8.7	9.4	12.3	14.3	11.2	9.3	12.3	14.2	8.0	2.5	107.3
Source: NOAA
