= Legon =

Suburb of Accra, Ghana

- Suburban Area
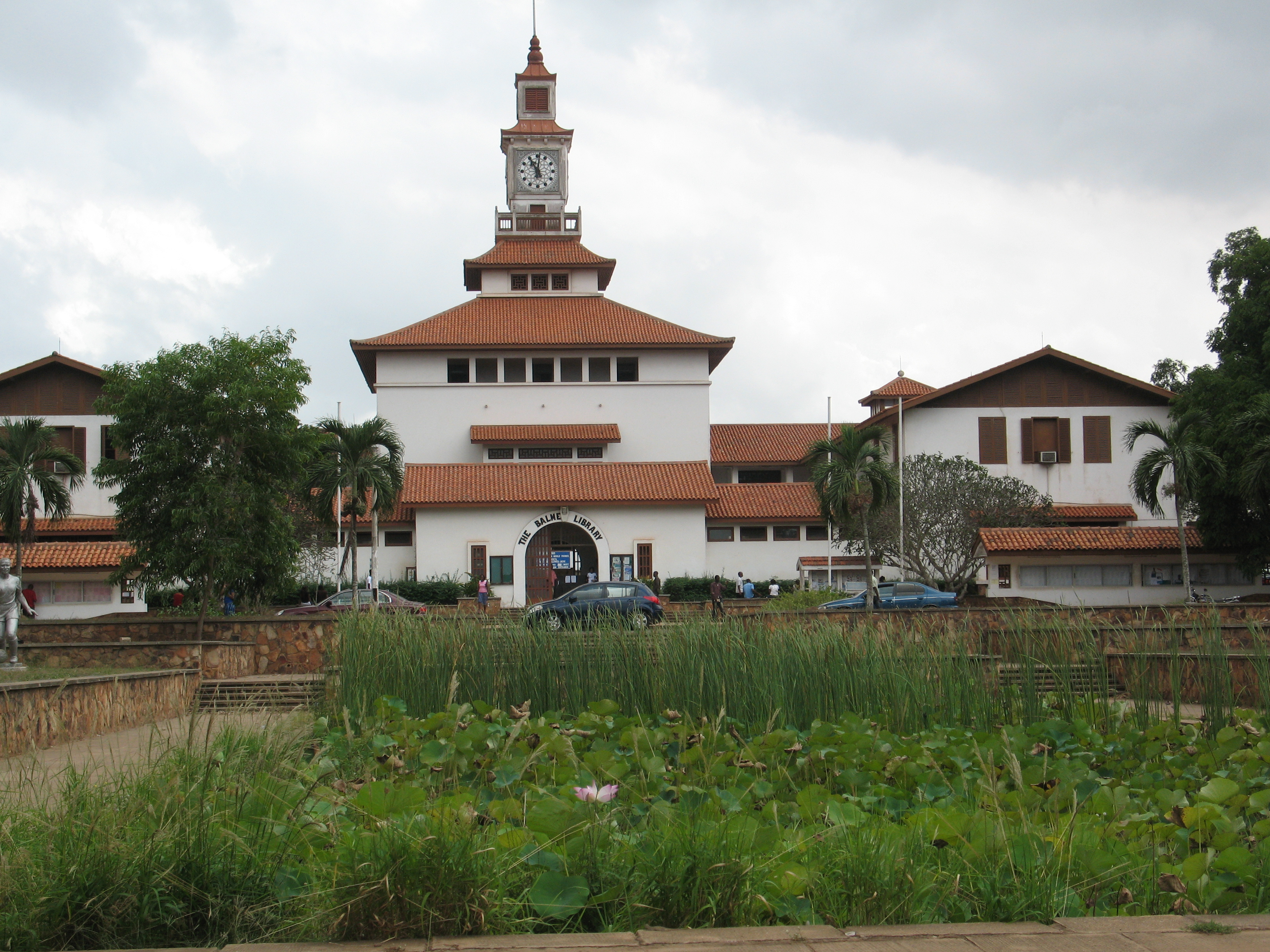

- Location within Ghana
- Coordinates: 5°39′N 0°11′W
- Country: Ghana
- Region: Greater Accra Region
- District: Ayawaso West Municipal District
- Elevation: 318 ft (97 m)
- Time zone: GMT
  - Summer (DST): GMT

Legon, a suburb of the Ghanaian city Accra, is situated about 12 kilometres (7.5 mi) north-east of the city center in the Ayawaso West Municipal District, a district in the Greater Accra Region of Ghana. Legon is home to the main campus of the University of Ghana. Ghanaians loosely refer to the University of Ghana simply as "Legon". Legon is also home to a few of Ghana's well known educational institutions such as Presbyterian Boys' Secondary School (PRESEC-Legon), Ghana Institute of Management and Public Administration(GIMPA) and the University of Professional Studies, Accra(UPSA). Legon is adjacent to one of the most prestigious residential suburbs of Accra - East Legon and only about 20 minutes drive from the Accra International Airport.

== Education ==
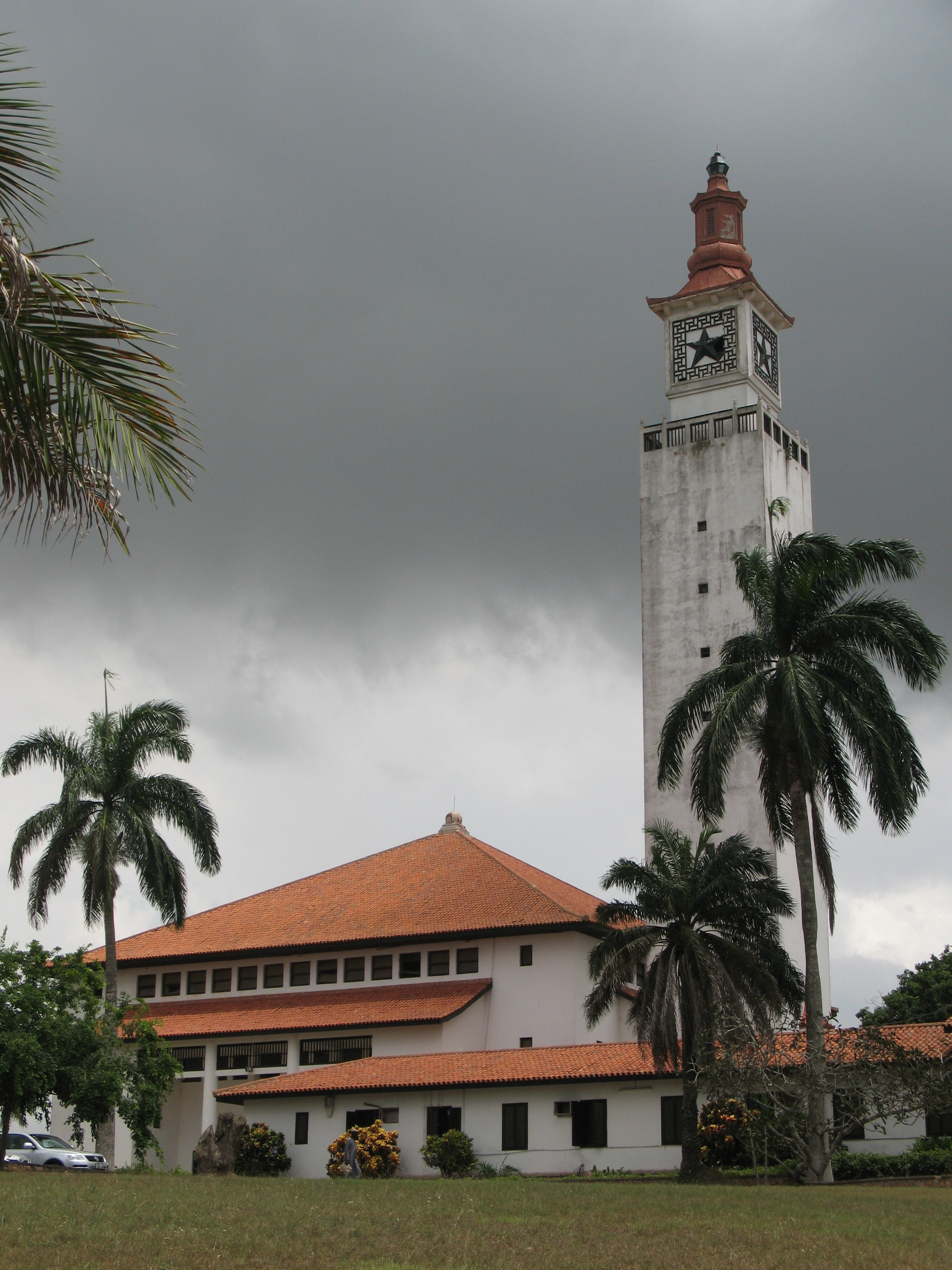
Legon Tower at the University of Ghana campus

The university has its own elementary and middle schools known commonly as the University Primary and Junior Secondary School (UPS) and the University of Ghana Staff Village Basic School. Students who attend UPS school are predominantly kin to the lecturers and senior staff of the University of Ghana.

The Lycée Français d'Accra, a French international school, is in East Legon.
