= National Cathedral of Ghana =

Interdenominational Christian cathedral (planned)

- National Cathedral of Ghana
- 5.5480°N 0.1800°W
- Location: Osu, Accra, Greater Accra Region, Ghana
- Country: Ghana
- Denomination: Interdenominational (Christian)
- Churchmanship: Ecumenical
- Website: www.nationalcathedralghana.org

History
- Status: Under construction / construction paused
- Founded: Announced in 2017
- Founder: Government of Ghana (initiative of the Presidency)
- Dedication: National House of Prayer and Worship
- Consecrated: (proposed; unbuilt)

Architecture
- Functional status: Planned
- Architect: Sir David Adjaye (Adjaye Associates)
- Architectural type: Cathedral complex
- Style: Contemporary architecture with Ghanaian vernacular influences
- Groundbreaking: 2018 (site clearance and preparatory works)

Specifications
- Capacity: 5,000 (main auditorium)
- Materials: Reinforced concrete, timber, glass, stone (proposed)

Administration
- Province: National
- Diocese: Non-denominational (national ecumenical oversight)

The National Cathedral of Ghana is a proposed interdenominational Christian cathedral to be located in Accra, Ghana. Announced during President Nana Addo Dankwa Akufo-Addo's tenure, the project was conceived as a national place of worship and civic monument to mark Ghana's post-independence identity. The design was prepared by Adjaye Associates, led by Sir David Adjaye.

== Background ==
The idea for a National Cathedral was publicly advanced during the presidency of Nana Akufo-Addo. The project site is adjacent to the Osu Cemetery and comprises several hectares of land earmarked for the cathedral complex, which was to include the main auditorium, chapels, a baptistery, a Bible museum, an art gallery and a music school.

== Design and facilities ==
Adjaye Associates' design proposed a contemporary cathedral that references Ghanaian architectural motifs (for example, pitched roof forms and timber detailing inspired by Akan and Ashanti craftsmanship). The complex was designed to seat approximately 5,000 people in the main auditorium and include ancillary cultural and educational facilities such as a music school and a Bible museum.

== Funding and costs ==
Initial public communications cited a project cost in the order of US$100 million when the scheme was widely publicised. By late 2022 independent reporting indicated the government (and related public funds) had already disbursed more than US$58 million on the project; Bloomberg reported that nearly half of this sum had been paid to the architect’s firm and related professional fees by that time.

Later government disclosures and reporting revised the total state cost upward. In July 2025 a government statement reported that the project had cost the state approximately US$97 million (this figure included prior disbursements and additional liabilities disclosed to Parliament).

== Procurement, contractors and contracts ==
Several procurement decisions associated with the project became points of public scrutiny. In particular, CHRAJ's inquiry and subsequent public reporting focused on the contract awarded to Ribade Company Ltd., and on payments and procurement procedures followed by the National Cathedral Board and Secretariat.

== Allegations, complaints and investigations ==
=== Parliamentary and public complaints ===
From 2021 onwards, opposition politicians and civil society figures raised concerns about transparency, the use of public funds, procurement irregularities and the prioritization of the cathedral in a period of economic strain. In January 2023 Member of Parliament Samuel Okudzeto Ablakwa petitioned the Commission on Human Rights and Administrative Justice (CHRAJ) alleging irregularities, including an alleged GH¢2.6 million transfer to a company he said was linked to a project official and other governance issues; CHRAJ confirmed receipt of the petition and investigated the matter.

=== CHRAJ findings and recommendations ===
In November 2024 CHRAJ issued a report on the matter and recommended a forensic audit and consideration of prosecution in relation to the Board of Trustees after finding potential breaches of procurement and governance rules linked to the Ribade contract.

CHRAJ’s public statements specifically noted concerns about the award of certain contracts and administrative practices, and urged further forensic review by the Auditor-General and prosecutorial authorities if wrongdoing were confirmed.

=== Audit by Deloitte and board responses ===
In September 2024 the Board Chairman of the National Cathedral (Apostle Professor Opoku Onyinah) stated that an audit by Deloitte Ghana covering the period from project inception to 31 December 2020 had been completed and briefed to church leaders; the board released a letter asserting no adverse findings in that statutory audit and said preparations were underway to resume the project.

Independent reporting and later official disclosures continued to raise new questions (for example, reporting in 2025 indicated additional liabilities and disputed payments), and CHRAJ’s recommended forensic audit remained a prominent call for clarity and possible prosecution depending on findings.

== Reactions and public debate ==
The cathedral project sparked division in Ghanaian public life. Supporters argued it would serve as an iconic national cultural and spiritual landmark and could stimulate jobs and tourism; critics argued that the project was ill-timed during economic difficulties and that public funds should prioritize basic services.

== Compensation and site clearance ==
Government statements in mid-2023 indicated that institutions and occupants displaced by site clearance for the cathedral had been compensated. The Minister of Lands and Natural Resources stated that affected institutions had received compensation in respect of demolitions required to prepare the site.

== Current status (as of 2025) ==
Construction progressed only to preparatory works and site clearance; by late 2022 and into 2024 the project had been effectively paused amid public scrutiny, cost escalations and calls for audits. In late 2024 CHRAJ recommended a forensic audit and possible prosecution; the Board published a response citing a Deloitte statutory audit (to 31 December 2020) with no adverse findings and signalled readiness to resume subject to resolution of governance issues. Government statements and later reporting updated cost estimates and liabilities

== Board of Trustees ==
After Archbishop Duncan Williams and Rev. Eastwood Anaba stepped down from the National Cathedral Board of Trustees, the following individuals remain as its current members.

Name	Profile	Position on Board
Apostle Prof. Opoku Onyinah	Former Chairman of the Church of Pentecost	Chairperson
Archbishop Charles Palmer-Buckle	Metropolitan Catholic Archbishop, Cape Coast	Vice Chairman
Most Rev. Bishop Justice Ofei Akrofi	Former Anglican Archbishop Emeritus	Member
Most Rev. T. K. Awotwi Pratt	Former Presiding Bishop of the Methodist Church	Member
Rt. Rev. Prof. Emmanuel Martey	Former Moderator of the Presbyterian Church	Member
Rev. Dr. Joyce Aryee	Executive Director, Salt and Light Ministries	Member
Rev. Victor Kusi Boateng	Founder of Power Chapel Worldwide	Member
Rev. Dr. Frimpong Manso	General Superintendent, Assemblies of God	Member
Kingsley Ofosu Ntiamoah	Executive Director, Ghana Museums and Monuments Board	Member

== See also ==
- David Adjaye
- List of cathedrals in Ghana
