= Samuel Atta Mills =

Ghanaian politician

Hon. Samuel Atta Mills
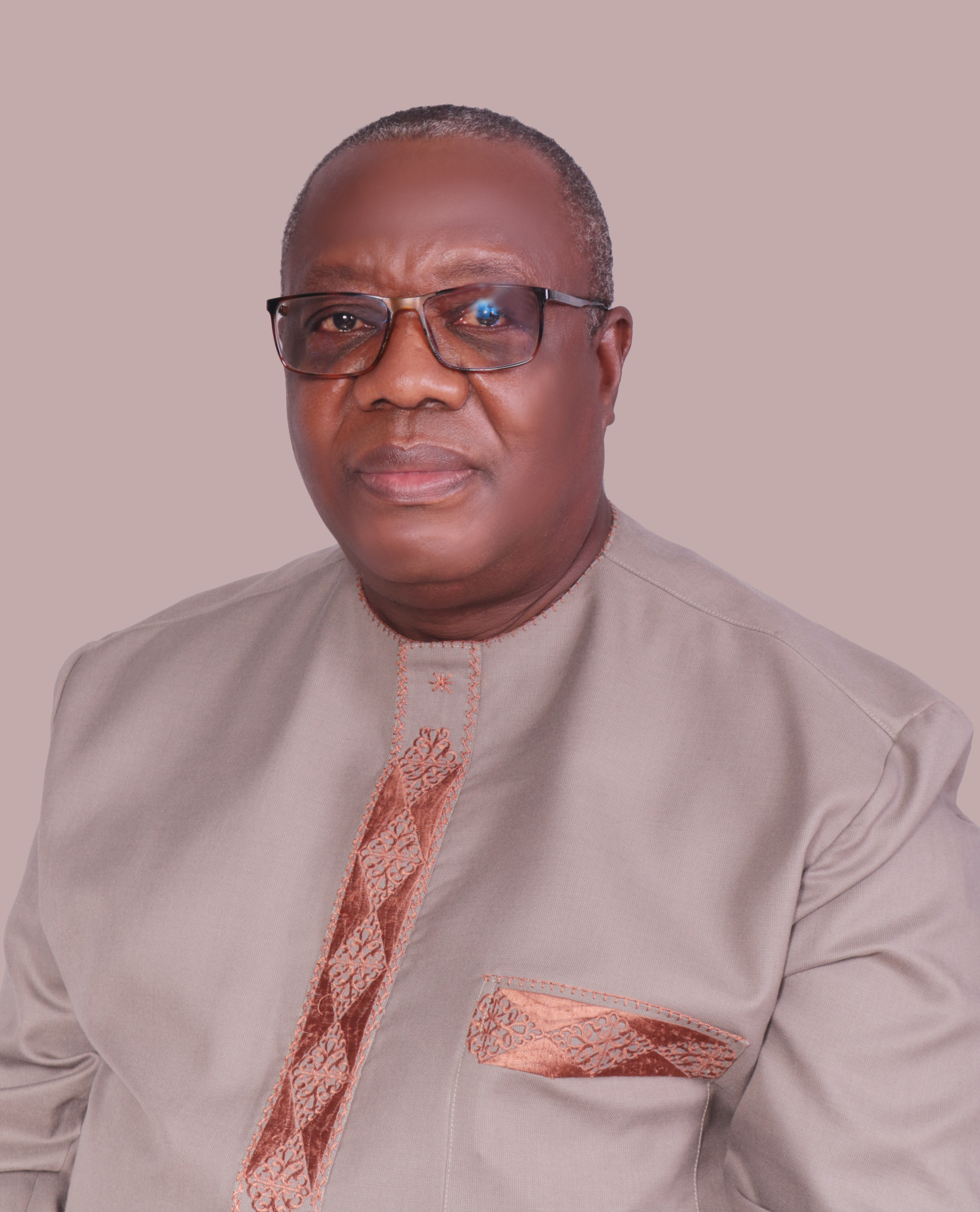

Member of Parliament for Komenda Edina Eguafo Abrem Constituency
- Incumbent
- Assumed office 7 January 2017
- President: John Dramani Mahama
- Preceded by: Nana Ato Arthur

Personal details
- Born: 26 April 1956 (age 70) Kissi, Ghana
- Party: National Democratic Congress
- Relations: John Atta Mills (brother)
- Education: Komenda College of Education; Belmont University, Mfantsipim School
- Occupation: Politician
- Profession: Manager
- Committees: Public Accounts Committee (Vice chairperson); Roads and Transport Committee

Samuel Atta Mills is a Ghanaian politician and member of the Seventh Parliament of the Fourth Republic of Ghana representing the Komenda Edina Eguafo Abrem Constituency in the Central Region on the ticket of the National Democratic Congress.

== Early life and education ==
Mills was born on Thursday 26 April 1956 and hails from Kissi in the Central Region of Ghana. He had his secondary education at Mfantsipim School, where he obtained his GCE Certificate. He proceeded to Komenda College where he obtained a Diploma in Education. Following his studies at Komenda, Mills enrolled at Belmont University where he was awarded his BBA in Economics and Accounting in 1984, and his MBA in Finance and Banking in 1986.

== Career ==
Prior to entering parliament, Mills worked at the Ghana Tourism Development Company as the chief executive officer from 2003 to 2005. In 2005, he joined Panera Bread as a Regional Manager. He worked in this capacity until 2009 when he was appointed Presidential Aide to the then president John Atta Mills. He once worked at First American Bank as a Commercial Loans Manager.

== Politics ==
Mills is a member of the National Democratic Congress.

=== 2016 elections ===
During the 2016 Ghanaian general election, he won the Komenda-Edina-Eguafo-Abirem Constituency parliamentary seat. He won with 21,957 votes making 38.4% of the total votes cast whilst the NPP parliamentary candidate Stephen Nana Ato Arthur had 15,960 votes making 27.9% of the total votes cast, the PPP parliamentary candidate John Sterlin had 18,860 votes making 33.0% of the total votes cast, and the CPP parliamentary candidate Mrs. Rose Austin Tenadu had 410 votes making 0.7% of the total votes cast.

=== Committees ===
In parliament, he has served on various communities. He is a member of the Roads and Transport Committee, and the vice chairperson of the Public Accounts Committee.

=== 2020 elections ===
Mills retained the Komenda-Edina-Eguafo-Abirem seat during the 2020 Ghanaian general election polling a total of 26,886 votes making 42.7% of the total votes cast against Samuel Joe Acquah, the NPP parliamentary candidate who had 23,039 votes making 36.6% of the total votes cast and the GUM parliamentary candidate Abubakr Sadiq Cann had 1,122 votes making 1.8% of the total votes cast, and the PPP parliamentary candidate John Sterlin had 11,964 votes making 19.0% of the total votes cast.

=== 2024 election ===
He retained his seat with 30,220 votes as MP for Komenda-Edina-Eguafo-Abirem constituency on the ticket of the NDC.

== Personal life ==
Mills is a Christian and a member of the Methodist Church of Ghana. He is the brother of the late ex-president John Atta Mills.
