= Religion in Ghana =

Religion in Ghana (2021 census)
1. Protestantism (49.0%)
2. Catholicism (10.0%)
3. Other Christian (12.3%)
4. Islam (19.9%)
5. Traditional faiths (3.20%)
6. No religion (1.10%)
7. Other religions (4.50%)

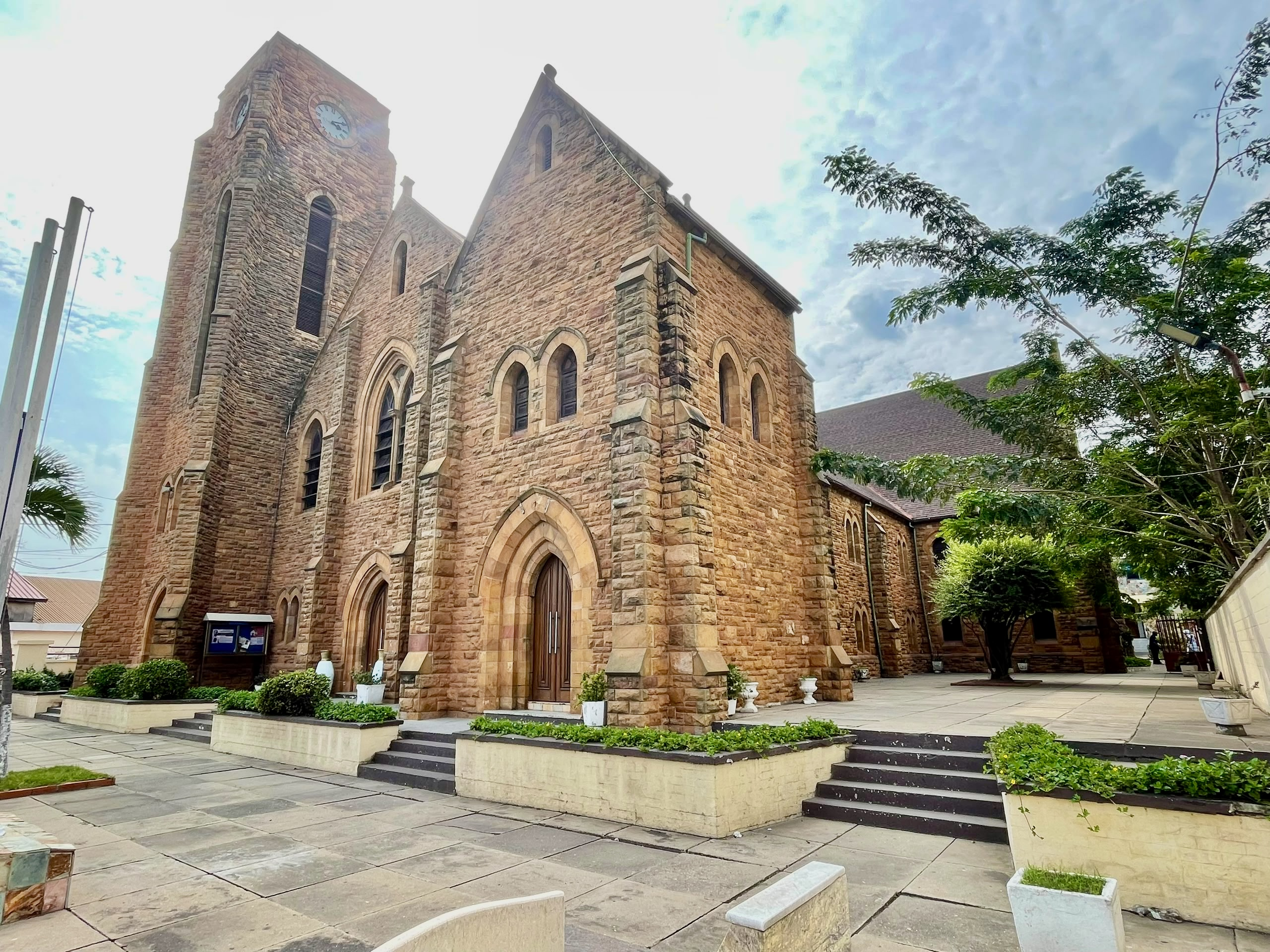
Accra Wesley Methodist Cathedral

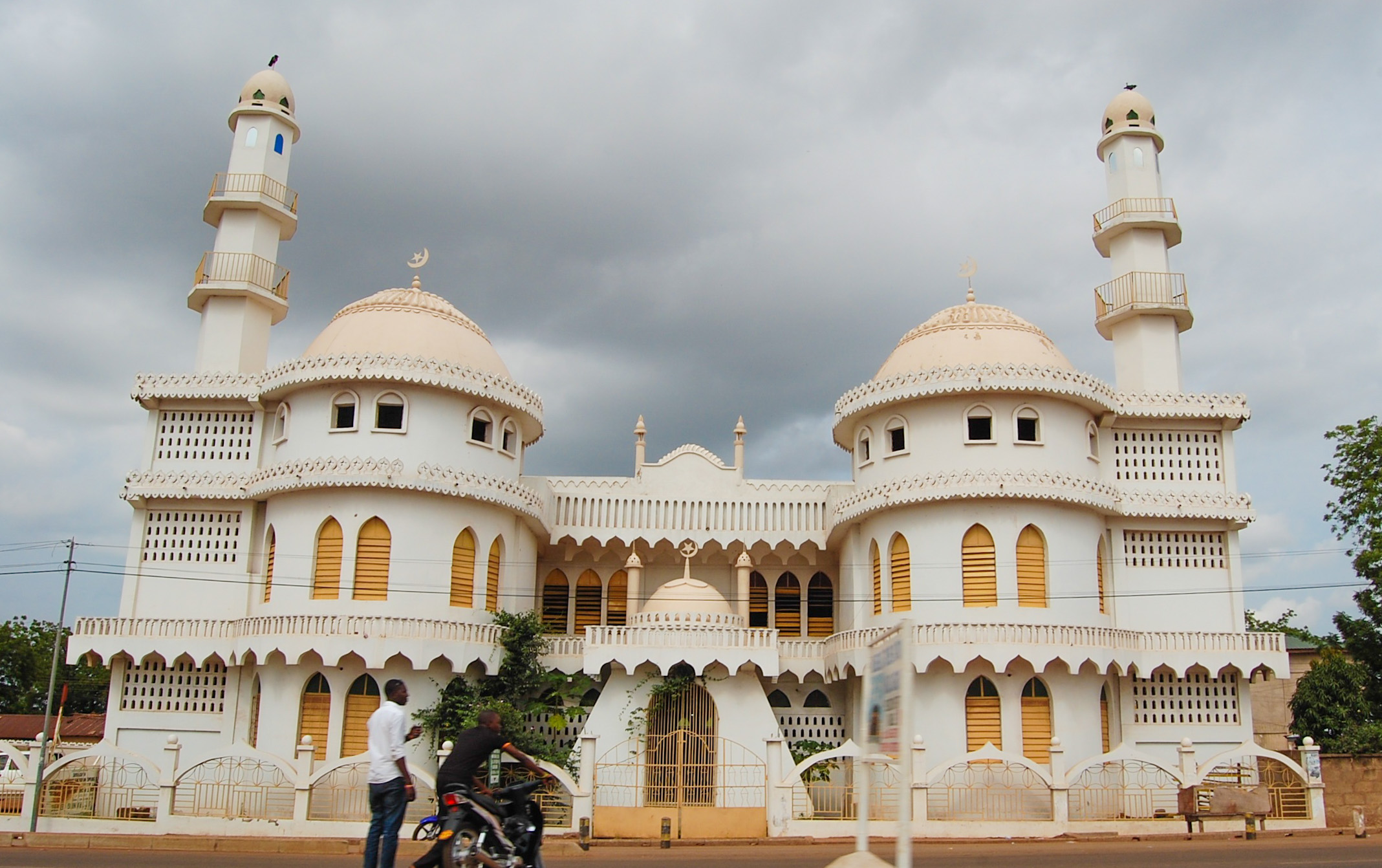
Ahmadiyya Central Mosque in Tamale, Northern region.

Christianity is the largest religion in Ghana, with 71.3% of the population belonging to various Christian denominations as of 2021 census. Islam is practised by 19.9% of the total population. According to a report by the Pew Research, 51% of Muslims are followers of Sunni Islam, 16% belong to the Ahmadiyya movement, around 8% identify with Shia Islam, while the remainder are non-denominational Muslims. Traditional religions such as the Akan Traditional Religion and Dagbon Traditional Religion are indigenous. Islam was the first Abrahamic religion to be introduced in the country between the tenth and 15th centuries, by Muslim traders. Later, Christianity was introduced via contact with the European missionaries. Christianity is mainly in the country's south while Islam is based in the north. Islam gained widespread acceptance in northern Ghana after Yaa Naa Zanjina accepted the faith in the 17th century.

Ghana is a secular state and the country's constitution guarantees freedom of religion and worship. Christmas, Easter, Eid al-Fitr and Eid al-Adha are recognised as national holidays.

== Overview ==
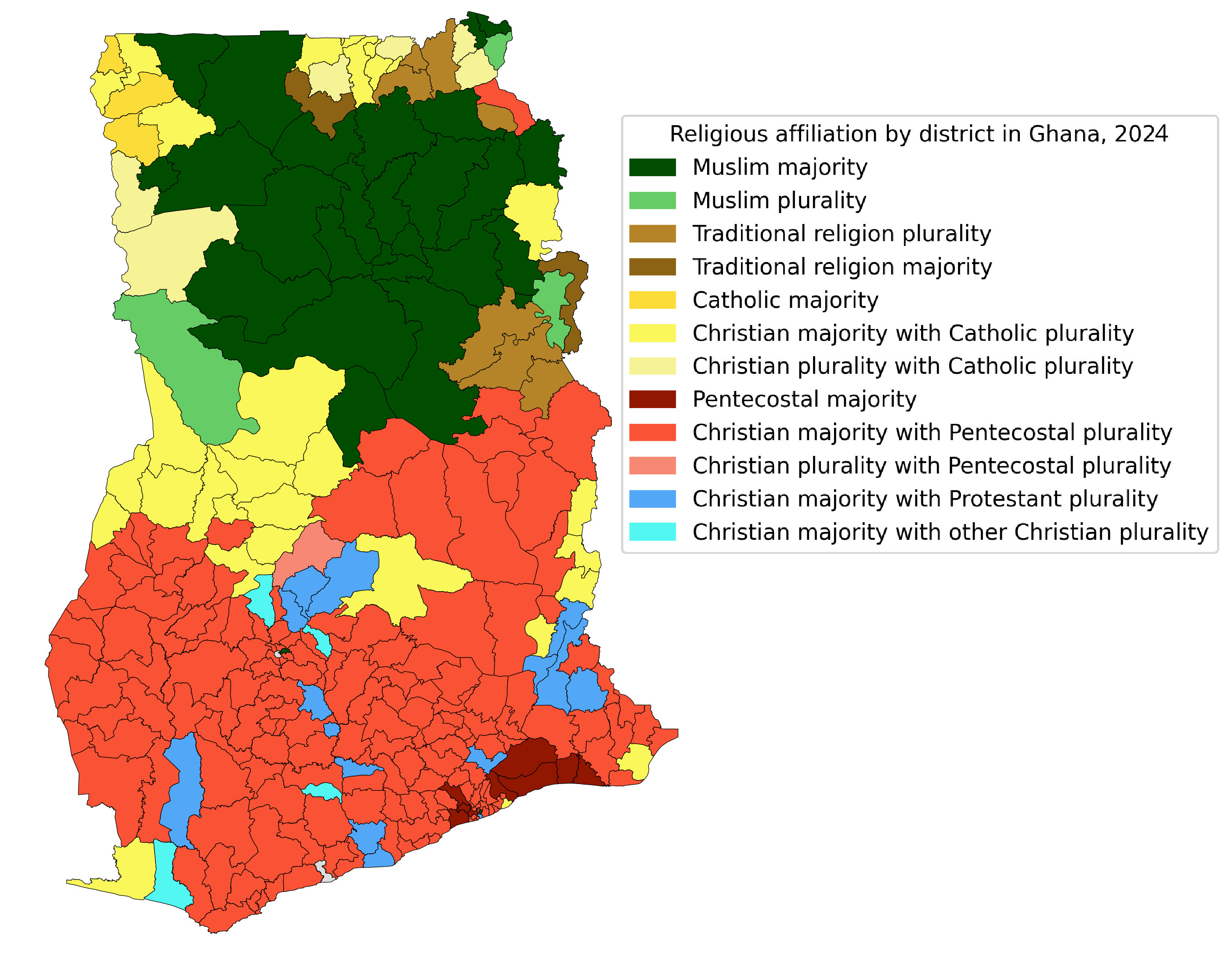
Map of dominant religious denomination in Ghana by district.

The largest Christian affiliations in the 2021 census were Pentecostal/charismatic (31.6% of the population) and Protestant (17.4%). According to a report by the Pew Research, 51% of Muslims are followers of Sunni Islam, approximately 16% belong to the Ahmadiyya movement and around 8% identify with Shia Islam, while the remainder are non-denominational Muslims.

Christian celebrations of Christmas and Easter are recognised as national holidays. In the past, vacation periods have been planned around these occasions, thus permitting both Christians and others living away from home to visit friends and family in the rural areas. Ramadan, the Islamic month of fasting, is observed by Muslims and traditional occasions are celebrated. These festivals include the Adae, which occur fortnightly, and the annual Odwira festivals. There is the annual Apoo festival activities, which is a kind of Mardi Gras and is held in towns.

There is "no significant link between ethnicity and religion in Ghana" in 2022.

In 2020, 60% of Ghanaians were Pentecostal and Evangelical.

== Statistics ==
Religious affiliation on census
	Christian					Muslim	Traditional	Other	No religion
	Total	Pentecostal/ charismatic	Other Protestant	Catholic	Other Christian	Muslim	Traditional	Other	No religion
2000	68.8%	24.1%	18.6%	15.1%	11%	15.9%	8.5%	0.7%	
2010	71.2%	28.3%	18.4%	13.1%	11.4%	17.6%	5.2%	0.8%	
2021	71.3%	31.6%	17.4%	10.0%	12.3%	19.9%	3.2%	4.5%	1.1%

== Christianity ==
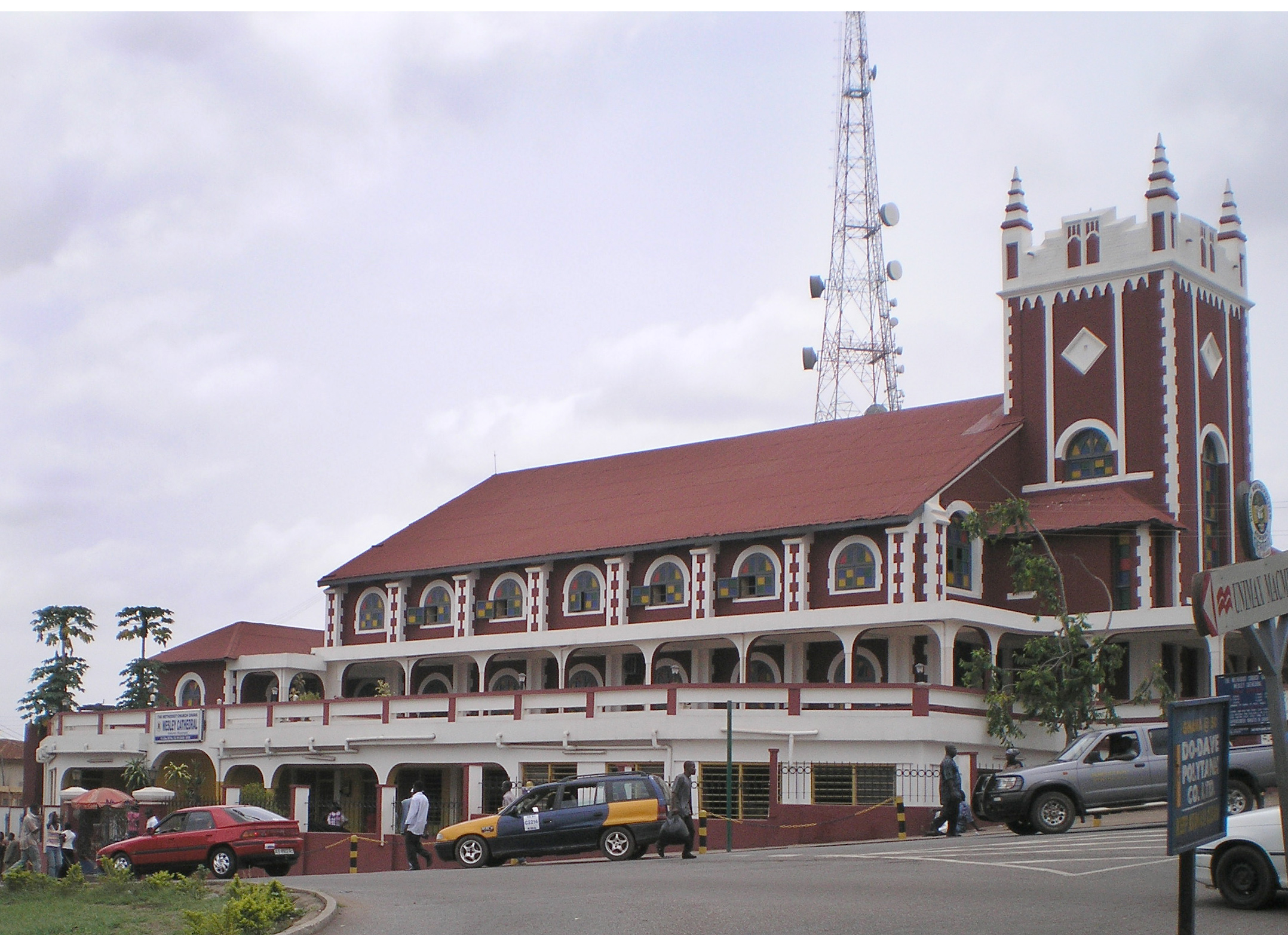
Wesley Methodist Cathedral in Kumasi.

The presence of Christian missionaries on the coast has been dated to the arrival of the Portuguese in the fifteenth century. It was the Basel/Presbyterian and Wesleyan/Methodist missionaries, who, in the nineteenth century, laid the foundation for the Christian church in Ghana. They began their conversions in the coastal area as "nurseries of the church" in which an educated African class was trained. There are secondary schools, including exclusively boys and girls schools, that are mission- or church-related institutions. Church schools have been opened to all since the state assumed financial responsibility for formal instruction under the Education Act of 1960.

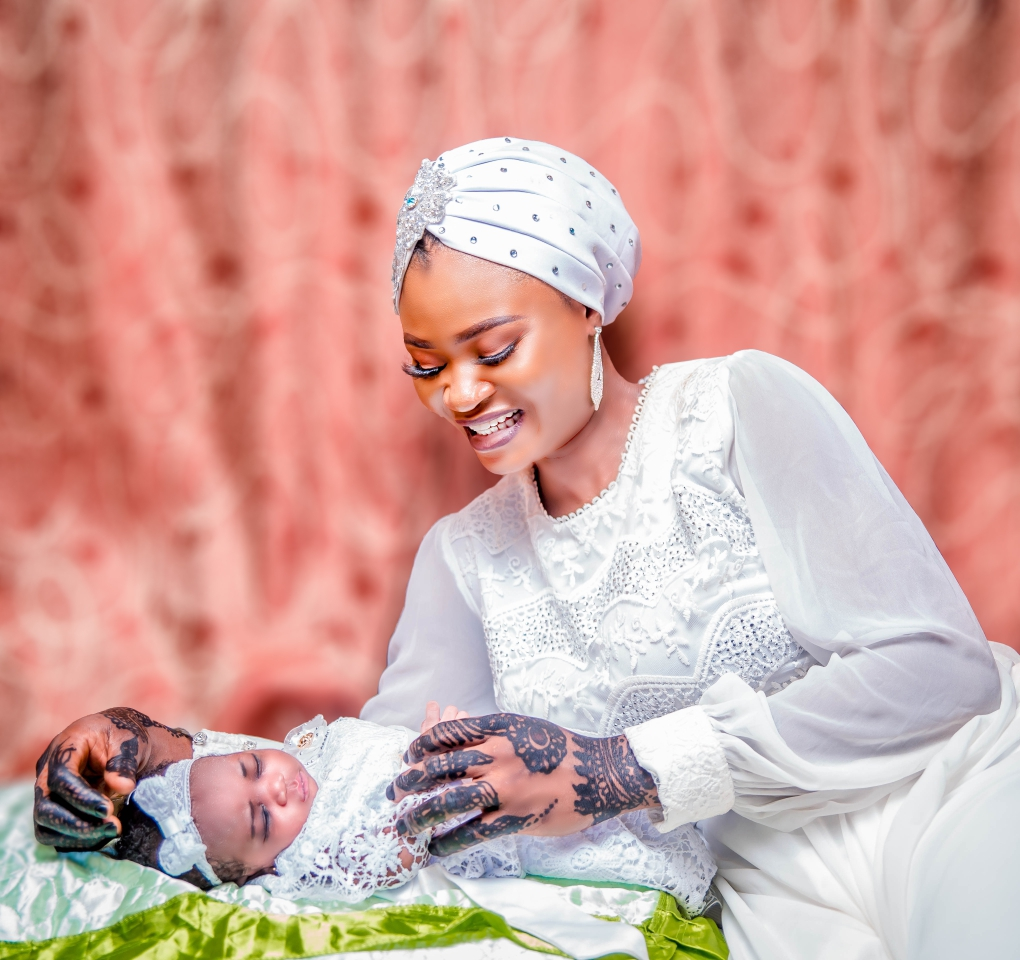
Christening of a daughter in Northern Ghana

Christian denominations are represented, including Evangelical Presbyterian and Catholicism. The Church of Jesus Christ of Latter-day Saints (LDS Church), in addition to chapels, has a temple in Accra. A second temple has been announced for the city of Kumasi.

The unifying organization of Christians in the country is the Ghana Christian Council, founded in 1929. Representing the Methodist, Anglican, Mennonite, Presbyterian, Evangelical Presbyterian, African Methodist Episcopal Zionist, Methodist Church Ghana, Evangelical Lutheran, and Baptist churches, and the Society of Friends, the council serves as the link with the World Council of Churches and other ecumenical bodies. The Seventh-day Adventist Church, which is not a member of the Christian Council, has a presence also. The Church opened the premier private and Christian University.

The National Catholic Secretariat, established in 1960, coordinates the in-country dioceses. These Christian organizations, concerned primarily with the spiritual affairs of their congregations, have occasionally acted in circumstances described by the government as political. Such was the case in 1991 when both the Conference of Catholic Bishops and the Christian Council of Ghana called on the military government of the Provisional National Defence Council (PNDC) to return the country to constitutional rule. The Roman Catholic newspaper, The Standard, was critical of government policies.

A 2015 study estimated that there are 50,000 Christians from a Muslim background in the country, though not all of them are necessarily citizens.

A phenomenon among Christians is the end-of-year prophecies by religious leaders. Followers are keen to hear what the coming year holds. Some of these prophecies centre on the death of a person or the result of keenly contested national elections.

=== Orange Order ===
The Grand Orange Lodge of Ghana governs the Orange Order in Ghana, a Protestant Christian fraternity, whose beliefs are based on the Reformation Principles and the truths contained in the Open Bible. The Order's influence on Christianity is primarily seen in its function as a Protestant friendly society that supports its members and the broader community. The organization, which was once predominately white, began admitting Ghanaian locals, leading to its full integration. It is currently the most active Orange community in Africa. In its current state, the fraternity has created a network of like-minded individuals who share a common faith. The Ghanaian Order completes charitable work and promotes positive evangelicalism. The organization's music, regalia, and marching traditions have been adopted by the local culture, giving them a unique Ghanaian character.

=== Syncretic religion ===
The rise of Apostolic or Pentecostal churches across the nation partly demonstrates the impact of social change and the eclectic nature of traditional cultures. Some establishments have drum societies and singing groups and the independent African and Pentecostal churches reflected in figures for membership that rose from 1 and 2 percent, respectively, in 1960, to 14 and 8 percent, respectively, according to a 1985 estimate.

== Islam ==
Ghana National Mosque, Accra.

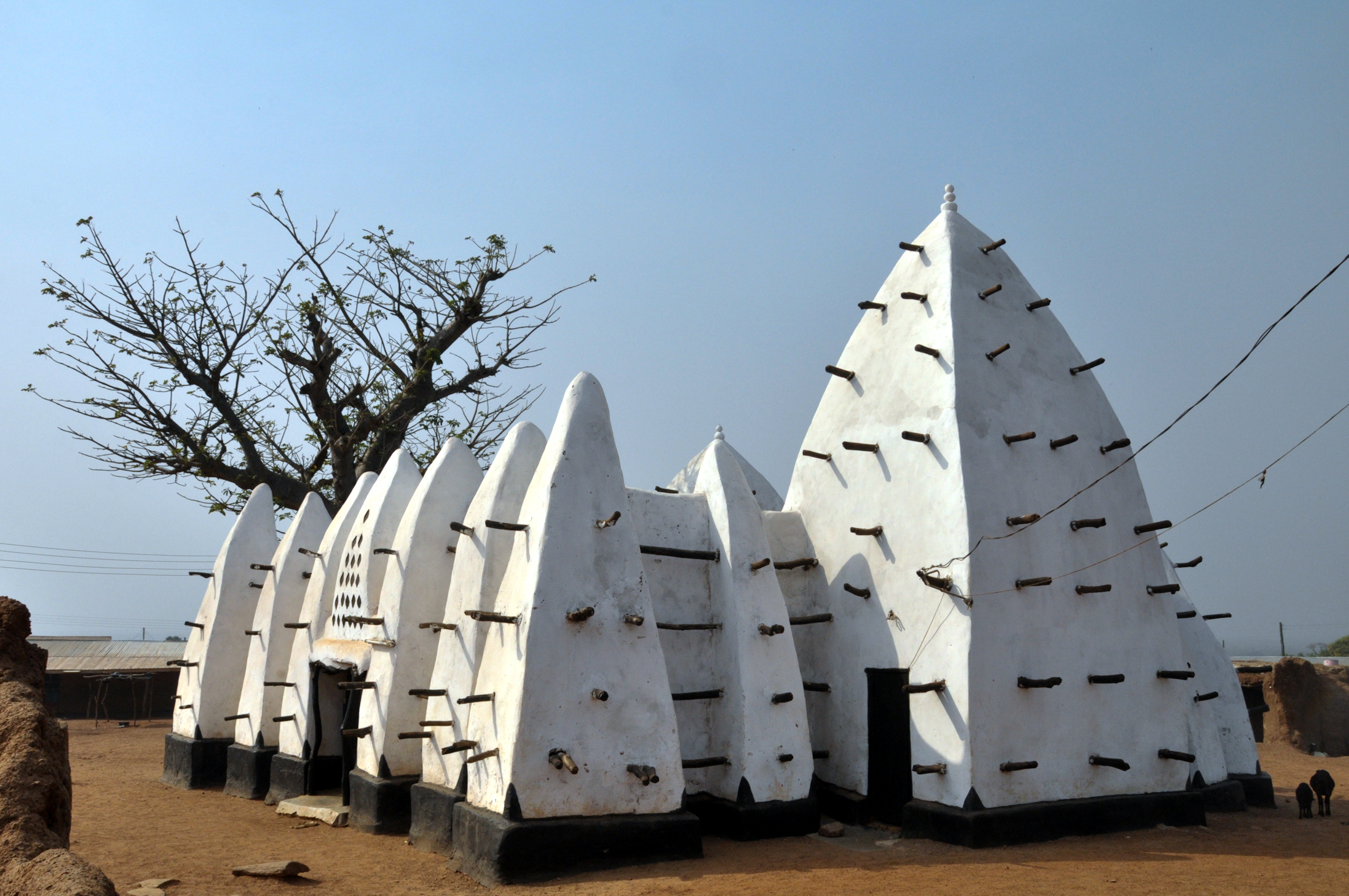
Larabanga Mosque, built in the 1400s in Northern Ghana

Islam made its entry into the northern territories of modern Ghana around the fifteenth century. Berber traders and clerics carried the religion into the area. Most Muslims in Ghana are Sunni, following the Maliki school of jurisprudence.

Those following the Maliki version of Islamic law and Sufism, involving the organization of mystical brotherhoods (tariq) for the purification and spread of Islam, is "not widespread". The Tijaniyah and the Qadiriyah brotherhoods are represented. The Ahmadiyya Muslim Community, a religion originating in nineteenth-century India, is the only non-Sunni order.

Guided by the authority of the Muslim Representative Council, religious, social, and economic matters affecting Muslims have been redressed through negotiations. The Muslim Council has been responsible for arranging pilgrimages to Mecca for believers who can afford the journey. There remains a gap between Muslims and Christians in Ghana. As society in Ghana modernized, Muslims were blocked from taking part in the modernization process. This is largely because access to jobs required Western education, and this education was only available in missionary schools. Many Muslims feared that sending their children to missionary schools may result in religious conversion.

== Traditional religion ==
Traditional religions in Ghana have retained their influence because of their intimate relation to family loyalties and local mores. The traditional cosmology expresses belief in a supreme being referred as [Nyogmo - Ga, Mawu - Dangme and Ewe, Nyame -Akan] and the supreme being is usually thought of as remote from daily religious life and is, therefore, not directly worshipped.

There are also the lesser gods that take "residency" in streams, rivers, trees, and mountains. These gods are generally perceived as intermediaries between the supreme being and society. Ancestors and numerous other spirits are also recognized as part of the cosmological order. The spirit world is considered to be as real as the world of the living. The dual worlds of the mundane and the sacred are linked by a network of mutual relationships and responsibilities. The action of the living, for example, can affect the gods or spirits of the departed, while the support of family ancestors ensures prosperity of the lineage or state.

Veneration of departed ancestors is a major characteristic of all traditional religions. The ancestors are believed to be the most immediate link with the spiritual world, and they are thought to be constantly near, observing every thought and action of the living. To ensure that a natural balance is maintained between the world of the sacred and that of the profane, the roles of the family elders in relation to the lineage within society are crucial. The religious functions, especially lineage heads, are clearly demonstrated during such periods as the Odwira, Homowo, or the Aboakyir festivals, that are organized in activities that renew and strengthen relations with ancestors.

=== Witchcraft ===
Popular religions in Ghana such as Christianity and Islam coexist with the beliefs of spirits, evil, and witchcraft illustrated in traditional beliefs. There is an intersection of religion brought through colonization and existing precolonial beliefs related to witchcraft. In predominantly Christian communities, it is common to find articles and news on what "good" Christians can do to fight evil forces of witchcraft.

The topic of witchcraft is often brought up in songs, and is present in the music culture in Ghana. Hearing about the topic through music adds to its broader relevance in its culture. Sung in Akan, the dominant non-English language in Ghana, popular songs reference witchcraft as explanation for things such as infertility, alcoholism, and death. Details of witch beliefs and the nocturnal lives of witches are depicted in letters and local newspapers across Ghana. Witchcraft accusations are commonly seen through various forms of media including television, newspaper, and magazines.

There are at least six witch camps in Ghana, housing a total of approximately 1,000 women. Women suspected of being witches sometimes flee to witch camp settlements for safety, often in order to avoid being lynched by neighbours.

== Rastafarian religion ==
The Rastafari movement is a movement that arose in Jamaica in the 1930s. Its adherents worship Haile Selassie I, Emperor of Ethiopia (1930–1974), as God incarnate, the Second Advent, or the reincarnation of Jesus. According to beliefs, Haile Selassie was the 225th in an unbroken line of Ethiopian monarchs of the Solomonic Dynasty. This dynasty is said to have been founded in the 10th century BC by Menelik I, the son of the Biblical King Solomon and Makeda, the Queen of Sheba, who had visited Solomon in Israel.

The Rastafari movement encompasses themes such as the spiritual use of cannabis and the rejection of western society, called 'Babylon'. It proclaims Africa, also known as 'Zion' as the original birthplace of mankind. Another theme is Royalty, with Rastas seeing themselves as African royalty and using honorifics such as Prince or King in order to give royalty to their names.

Many Rastas say that it is not a "religion" at all, but a "Way of Life". Rastafari are generally monotheists, worshipping a singular God whom they call Jah. Rastas see Jah as being in the form of the Holy Trinity, that is, Father, Son and the Holy Spirit. Rastas say that Jah, in the form of the Holy Spirit, lives within the human.

Afrocentrism is another central facet of the Rastafari culture. They teach that Africa, in particular Ethiopia, is where Zion, or paradise, shall be created. As such, Rastafari orients itself around African culture. Rastafari holds that evil society, or "Babylon", has always been white-dominated, and has committed such acts of aggression against the African people as the Atlantic slave trade. Despite this Afrocentrism and focus on people of the black race, members of other races, including whites, are found and accepted by Blacks among the movement, for they believe Rasta is for all people.

There are Rasta communities all around the world. In Ghana, particularly in the coast, there are many Rastafari places of worship. The Rasta community around Kokrobite is well known throughout Ghana. Many Rasta music festivals occur and Rasta objects are sold.

== Hinduism ==
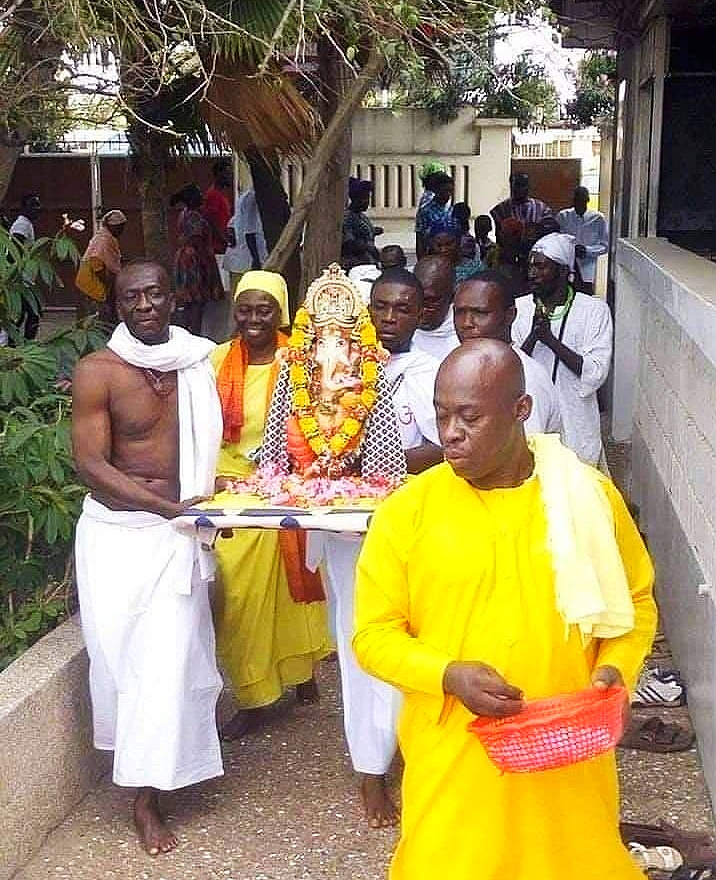
Hindus in Ghana celebrating Ganesh Chaturti

Hinduism has been practised in Ghana since 1970s. It was established by a traditional Priest known as Kwesi Esel who travelled to Asia to seek healing powers. Hinduism is spread in Ghana actively by Ghana's Hindu Monastery headed by Swami Ghananand Saraswati and Hare Krishnas. Sathya Sai Organisation, Ananda Marga and Brahma Kumaris are also active in Ghana. Hindu temples have been constructed in Accra.

== Afrikania Mission ==
Afrikania Mission is a Neo-Traditional Movement established in Ghana in 1982 by a former Catholic Priest, Kwabena Damuah, who resigned from the church and assumed the traditional priesthood titles, Osofo Okomfo. The Mission aims to reform and update African traditional religion, and to promote nationalism and Pan-Africanism. Rather than being a single new religious movement, Afrikania also organizes various traditional shrines and traditional healers into associations bringing unity to a diffused system and thereby a greater voice in the public arena. Afrikania has instituted an annual convention for the traditional religion.

It has become a mouthpiece of traditional religion in Ghana through its publications, lectures, seminars, press conferences, and radio and television broadcast in which it advocates a return to traditional religion and culture as the spiritual basis for the development of Africa. The Mission is also known by other names such as AMEN RA (derived from Egyptian religion, and interpreted to mean 'God Centred'), Sankofa faith (implying a return to African roots for spiritual and moral values) and Godian Religion, which it adopted briefly during a period of association with Godianism, a Nigerian-based neo-traditional Movement.

== Buddhism ==
In 1998 the first Nichiren Shoshu Temple in Africa was opened in Accra. Ghana has the largest Nichiren Shoshu Temple outside of Japan. The temple is located at Anyaa-Ablekuma Road at the Fan Milk Junction in Accra. There are other small Buddhist prayer spaces in larger cities.

== Irreligion ==
Atheism and Agnosticism are difficult to measure in Ghana.

== Freedom of religion ==
Freedom of religion exists in Ghana. A Religious Bodies (Registration) Law 1989 was passed in June 1989 to regulate churches. By requiring certification of all Christian religious organizations operating in Ghana, the government reserved the right to inspect the functioning of these bodies and to order the auditing of their financial statements. The Ghana Council of Churches interpreted the Religious Bodies Law as contradicting the concept of religious freedom in the country. According to a government statement, however, the law was designed to protect the freedom and integrity of genuine religious organizations by exposing and eliminating groups established to take advantage of believers. The PNDC repealed the law in late 1992. Despite its provisions, all orthodox Christian denominations and many spiritual churches continued to operate in the country.

In 2023, the country was scored 3 out of 4 for religious freedom.

== See also ==
- Abonsam

== Works cited ==
- Owusu-Ansah, David. "Society and Its Environment" (and subchapters). A Country Study: Ghana (La Verle Berry, editor). Library of Congress Federal Research Division (November 1994). This article incorporates text from this source, which is in the public domain (See About the Country Studies / Area Handbooks Program)
