= List of cathedrals in Ghana =

This is the list of cathedrals in Ghana sorted by denomination.

== Catholic ==
Cathedrals of the Catholic Church in Ghana:

- Holy Spirit Cathedral in Accra
- St. Francis de Sales Cathedral in Cape Coast
- St. Anne's Cathedral in Damongo
- Cathedral of St. Anthony of Padua in Goaso
- Sacred Heart Cathedral in Ho
- Christ the King Cathedral in Akatsi
- St. George's Cathedral in Koforidua
- St. Paul Cathedral in Mampong
- St. Peter's Cathedral Basilica in Kumasi
- Cathedral Basilica of Our Lady of Seven Sorrows in Navrongo
- St. Thomas Cathedral in Obuasi
- Our Lady Star of the Sea Cathedral in Takoradi
- Christ the King Cathedral in Sunyani
- Our Lady of Annunciation Cathedral in Tamale
- Cathedral of St. Paul in Techiman
- St. Andrew's Cathedral in Wa
- Cathedral of St. Joseph in Wiawso
- Cathedral of Our Lady of Lourdes in Yendi
- St. Michael Co-Cathedral in Keta
- St. Gabriel's Co-Cathedral in Konongo
- Sacred Heart Co-Cathedral in Bolgatanga
- St. Paul's Pro-Cathedral in Sekondi
- St. Francis Xavier's Cathedral in Donkorkrom
- St. Peter Claver's Cathedral in Jasikan

== Anglican ==
Cathedrals of the Church of the Province of West Africa:

- Holy Trinity Cathedral in Accra
- The Cathedral Church of St Michael and All Angels in Asante Mampong
- Christ Church Cathedral in Cape Coast
- Cathedral Church of St. George the Martyr in Ho
- Saint Cyprian's Anglican Cathedral in Kumasi
- The Cathedral Church of Ascension in Sefwi-Wiawso
- Bishop Agliomby's Memorial Cathedral in Tamale
- St. Andrews Cathedral in Sekondi
- St. Anselm's Anglican Cathedral in Sunyani
- St. Peter's Anglican Cathedral in Koforidua
- The Cathedral Church of St Anthony of Padua in Diocese of Dunkwa-on-Offin

== Methodist ==
Cathedrals of the Methodist Church of Ghana:

- Wesley Methodist Cathedral in Accra
- Wesley Methodist Cathedral in Cape Coast
- Wesley Methodist Cathedral in Kumasi
- Wesley Methodist Cathedral in Sekondi
- St. Paul's Methodist Cathedral in Tema

== See also ==
- List of cathedrals
