= Komenda College of Education =

Teachers Training College in Ghana

- Motto: Bepכwso Kurow Hyeren
- Motto in English: A city set on a hill shines forth
- Established: 1948; 78 years ago
- Affiliations: University of Education Winneba, Government of Ghana
- Principal: Kwesi Nkum Wilson
- Location: Komenda, Komenda-Edina-Eguafo-Abirem Municipal District, CK1838, Ghana; 5.04632°N 1.50526°W
- Language: English
- Region Zone: Central; Central / Western
- Short name: Komenco
- Website: www.komendacollege.edu.gh
- Source: An Atlas of The Forty Colleges of Education in Ghana.

Komenda College of Education is a co-educational teacher education college in Komenda, Central Region (Ghana). It is one of the 46 public colleges of education in Ghana and participated in the DFID-funded Transforming Teacher Education and Learning Ghana (T-TEL) programme. In 2017, Komenda CoE implemented a project to go paperless. The Principal is Rev. Prof. Kwesi Nkum Wilson.

== History ==
Komenda College was established in 1948, on a site which had been used by the British Navy during World War II.

Komenda College of Education started out of the buildings(Barracks) left by the Fleet Air Arm of the British Navy after the World War II. Through the efforts of Mr. A.B. Sam, regent of Komenda, the legacy was leased to the Methodist Church Ghana, in 1947 to be used as a training college. The government made some renovation works on the buildings to make it suitable for educational use. On March 11, 1948, the first batch of students numbering forty men was enrolled to start an initial 2-year Teacher's Cert ‘B’ programme. In 1952, the college became a co-educational institution with its first batch of thirty women. The first principal of the college was Mr. Lawrence Alfred Creedy, a British citizen. The motto of the college is “Bepכwso Kurow Hyer3n”, meaning a city set on a hill, shines forth. The adopted strands by the founding father were; Academic excellence, Service to God and Service to mankind. Messrs R.C. Mensah, C.K. Penrose, Wonderful Dadson, K.A. Essuman and J.C.O. Okyere were among the pioneer tutors of the college.

The college has gone through the following academic programmes:

- 2-year. Cert “B’.
- 4-year. Cert “A”.
- 2-year. Cert “A” (Post –Sec)
- 3-year. Specialist (Music & Art)
- 2-year Modular Course
- 3-year Cert “A” (Post –Sec)
- 4-year (Untrained Diploma in Basic Education)
- 3-year Diploma in Basic Education

== Notable alumni ==
- Ama Bame Busia - Politician; formerly member of the Ghana Council of State
- Dora Francisca Edu-Buandoh - Academic; Pro Vice Chancellor of the University of Cape Coast
- Kwame Karikari - Journalist and academic; Director General of Ghana Broadcasting Corporation (1982-1984)
- Samuel Atta Mills - Member of parliament for the Komenda-Edina-Eguafo-Abirem Constituency (2017–)
- Kwamena Minta Nyarku - Member of parliament for the Cape Coast North Constituency (2021–)
- Titus Awotwi Pratt - Presiding Bishop of the Methodist Church Ghana, 2014 – 2018.

== Project ==
In June 2021, the college launched a project called ‘One Student, One Tree’ as part of the Green Ghana Initiative which sought to introduce students to plant, maintain and ensure environmental cleanliness.

== Awards ==
In November 2022, the college were the winners of the Southern Zone of the National Insurance Debate for tertiary schools in Ghana.

== Departments ==
1. Mathematics/ICT
2. Languages
3. Education
4. Social Sciences
5. TVET
6. Science
7. Creative Arts

== Programmes ==
1. Agricultural Science
2. Early Grade
3. Home Economics
4. Mathematics/ICT
5. Mathematics/Science
6. Technical
7. Upper Primary
8. Visual Arts

== Principals ==
The following have been principals of the college:
Name	Years served
Mr. L.A. Creedy	1948 -1962
R.R. Okyne	1962-1971
Rev. C.K. Assiaw-Dufu	1972-1978
Mr. J.A. Walker (Ag)	1978-1981
Mr. Robert Mensah	1981-1986
Jane A. Zormelo	1986-1992
Mr. Isaac Kismet Sagoe (Ag)	1992-1993
Mrs. Rose Newman	1993-1999
Mr. J.K. Sekum (Ag)	1999-2000
Mr. J.K. Dadzie	2000-2006
Ms. Gladys Annan Noonoo	2007-2014
Mrs. Comfort Sarpong Akosa	2014-2018
Mr. Samuel Kow Parker (Ag)	2018-2019
V. Rev. Prof. Kwesi Nkum Wilson	2019-
