= National Cathedral =

National Cathedral may refer to:

- Iglesia Filipina Independiente National Cathedral, a cathedral of the Philippine Independent Church in Manila
- National Cathedral of Ghana, a planned interdenominational cathedral in Accra
- National Cathedral School, an Episcopal school in Washington D.C.
- People's Salvation Cathedral, an under-construction Eastern Orthodox cathedral in Bucharest sometimes referred to as National Cathedral
- Saint Peter and Paul Cathedral, Paramaribo, a Roman Catholic church in Suriname sometimes referred to as National Cathedral
- Washington National Cathedral, an Episcopal cathedral in Washington D.C.
