= Religion in Ivory Coast =

Religion in Ivory Coast (2021 census)
1. Islam (42.5%)
2. Christianity (39.8%)
3. No religion (12.6%)
4. Traditional faiths (2.20%)
5. Other religions (0.70%)
6. Undeclared (2.20%)

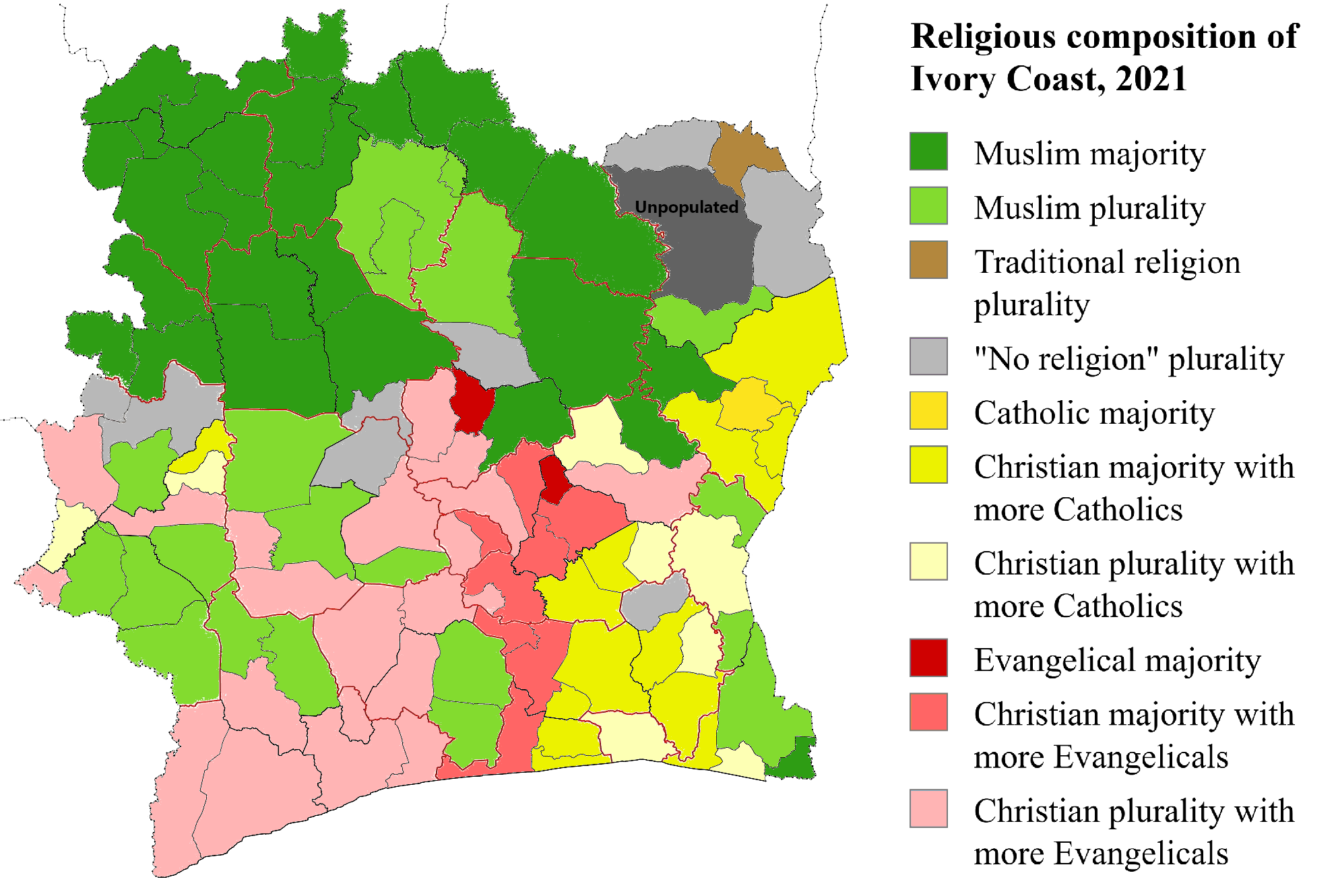
Dominant religion by department in Ivory Coast, 2021.

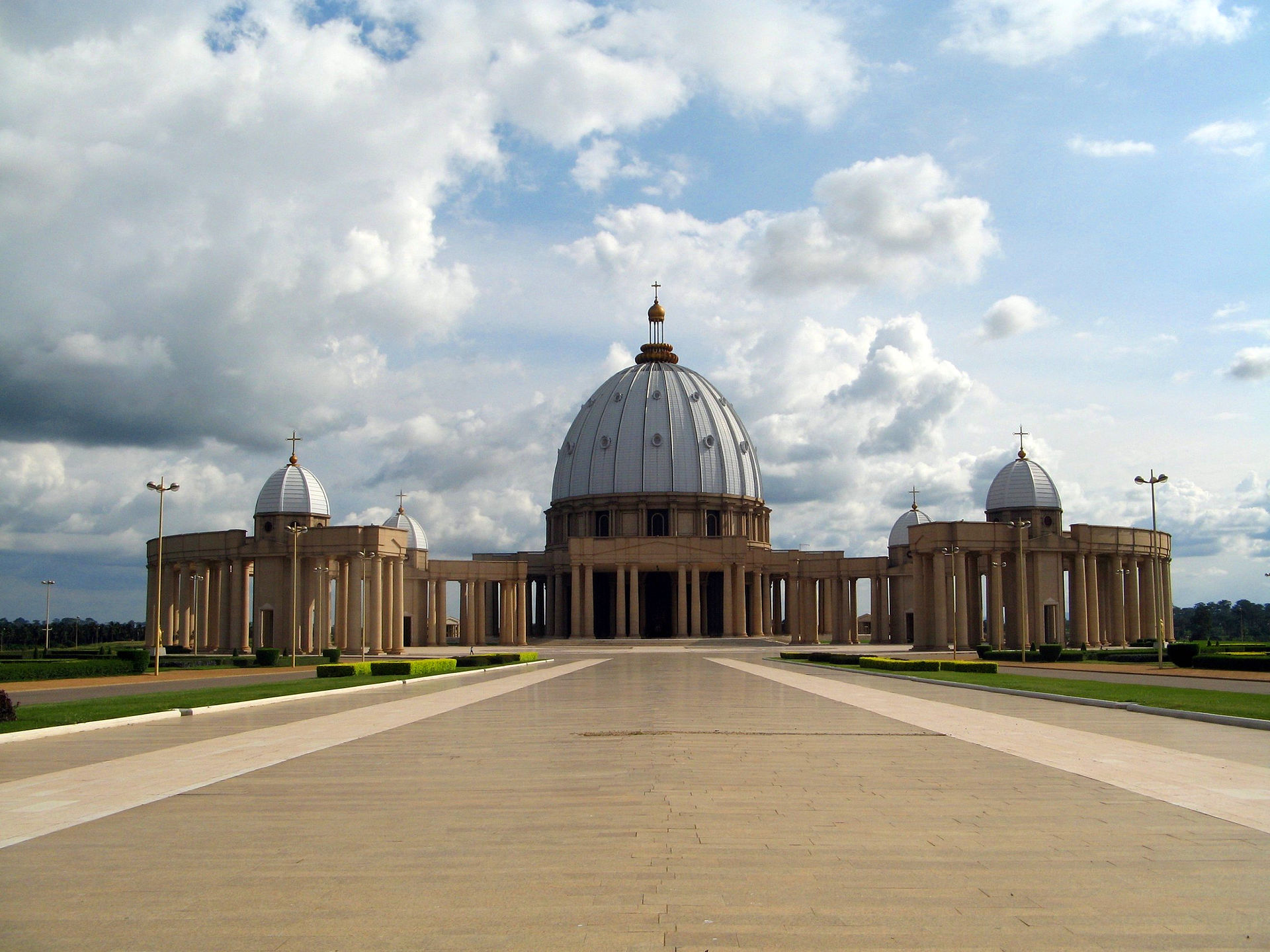
The Basilica of our Lady of Peace in Yamoussoukro; the largest Christian church and the 3rd tallest in the world.

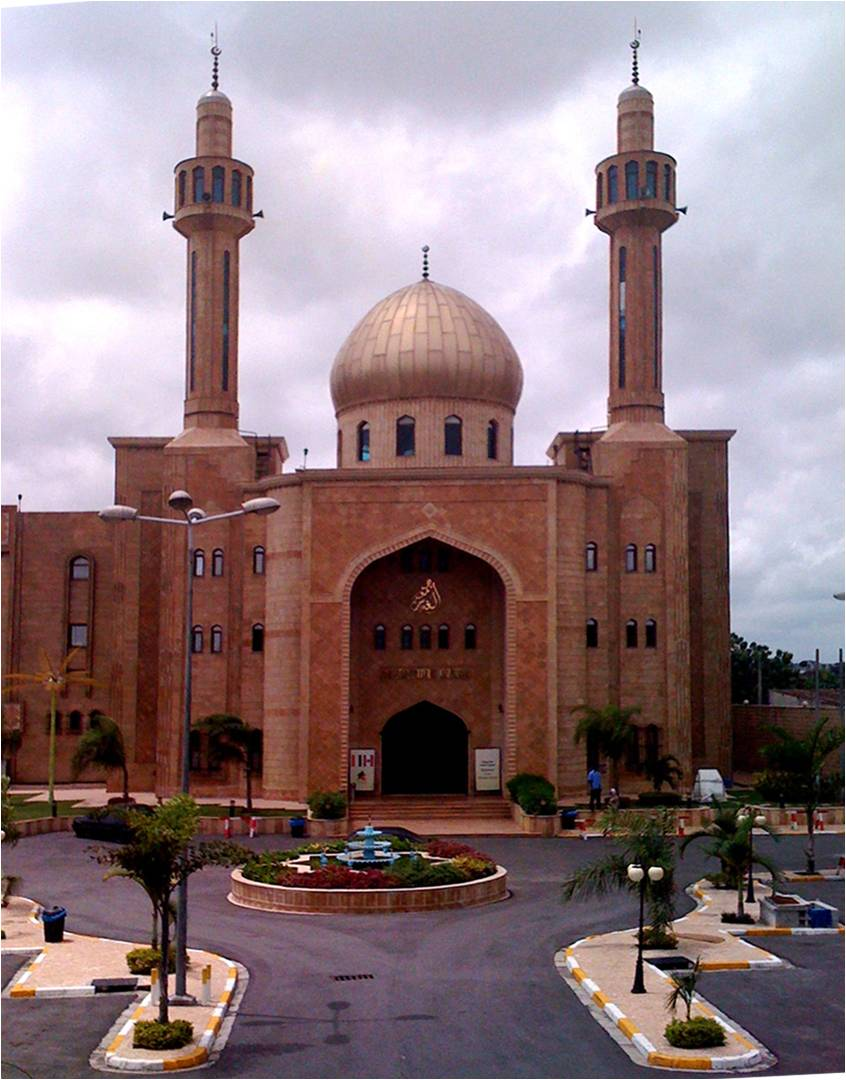
Central mosque in Marcory.

Religion in Ivory Coast is diverse, with no particular religion representing the majority of the population. According to the 2021 census, Islam (mainly Sunni) is professed by 42.5% of the total population, while adherents of Christianity (mainly Roman Catholic and Evangelical) represented 39.8% of the population. In addition, 12.6% of Ivorians reported to be non-religious and 2.2% claimed to follow Animism or traditional faiths. Between the 2014 and 2021 censuses, the share of Christians increased from 33.9 to 39.8 percent, while the share of Muslims declined from 42.9 to 42.5 percent of the total population.

Christianity is practised in a variety of forms throughout the country though mostly in the south. Islam has been practised in the far north for roughly seven centuries, shifting in influence over time due to contact with the Muslim areas to the north and immigration. Christian missionaries arrived at the coast in the 17th century but did not win converts in large numbers until the 19th century. Christianity's appeal was strongest among educated Africans and those who sought advancement through European contact.

== Local religions ==
Indigenous African religions offer explanations for life's dilemmas in a local cultural context. Local religions reassure people that they are living in harmony with the universe and that this harmony can be preserved by maintaining proper relationships with all beings. For this reason, separating religion from other aspects of life serves to distort, rather than clarify, its meaning.

Spiritual beings—a creator, ancestral spirits, and spirits associated with places and objects—can influence a person's life and luck. This is the major premise on which belief and practice are based. The distinction between the spiritual and physical "worlds," in Western secular terms, is unimportant in the face of what is interpreted as overwhelming evidence that physical events may have spiritual causes.

Lineages are also important in understanding the organization of many Ivorian religions. The spiritual unity of the descent group transcends distinctions among the unborn, the living, and the deceased. In this context, religious differences are not based on disagreements over doctrine. Rather, groups living in different social and physical environments encounter different spiritual and physical dangers, and their religious needs differ accordingly. This diversity accounts, in part, for early missionaries in West Africa who often described the spiritual "chaos" they encountered, when they were actually observing different social groupings, each with different spiritual obligations to ancestral and other spirits, acting in accordance with common beliefs about the nature of the universe.

=== Religions of the South ===
Most Akan believe in a supreme being, Nyame, who created all things and from whom lesser gods derive their power. Nyame is not worshiped directly but is approached through intermediaries. These lesser gods (abosom) may inhabit lakes, streams, rivers, or trees. Below them are minor deities whose power is invoked through amulets or charms (suman) worn for protection.

Ancestral spirits (samanfo) surpass these deities in importance among most Akan people, as it is the ancestors who safeguard the prosperity of the lineage and provide assistance in meeting daily challenges. Ancestral spirits are often consulted, offered food and drink, and reminded that people are depending on them, in the hope that an individual will be able to act with confidence, especially in dealing with others in the lineage. Failure to perform sacrifices to ancestral spirits not only damages a person spiritually but also brings forth the wrath of the ancestor and can result in tragedy or unhappiness.

An individual's spirit, or soul (elaka among the Agni; okra among the Abron or Baoulé), is immortal and indestructible. A living individual also possesses other spiritual substances, including sunsum, which is adaptable and determines a person's character, and mogya, which determines a person's membership in a matrilineage. Through transgressions—failure to perform rituals or obey moral precepts—an individual can damage the soul or lose it entirely. Upon death, the soul (or in some areas, part of the soul) may enter the kingdom of the dead, where its existence is happy and peaceful, or it may reenter a human being to continue on its path toward fulfillment.

Akan religious practitioners include lineage heads, village chiefs (when the head and the chief are not the same individual), and priests who officiate at ritual observances for cults honoring specific deities. These priests (akomfo) undergo extensive training as apprentices to established practitioners. Priests can also act as diviners, and the most esteemed among them are believed to be clairvoyant, able to locate the source of spiritual difficulty for their clients, who consult them for a fee. They also give instructions for coping with adversity. Priests sometimes act as doctors, since many diseases are believed to have spiritual causes.

Sorcerers (obayifo) are spiritual practitioners who, in the Akan worldview, bring about evil. Their actions are believed to be motivated by envy or hatred, and, it is feared, they may be employed by one's enemies. Sorcery often consists of poisoning, which may be counteracted by a priest or detected by a diviner, but one of the hazards of dealing with the spiritual realm is that sorcerers are sometimes disguised as priests or diviners. A person may use amulets or other objects to ward off the evil effects of sorcery, but these are sometimes powerless.

Collective religious ceremonies are important to the life of many Akan peoples. The most important of these is the yam festival, which serves several functions. It is a memorial service for the dead and begs for their protection in the future; it is a time of thanksgiving for good harvests; and it is a ritual of purification that helps rid the group of evil influences. It also provides an opportunity to recall the discovery of the yam—now an important part of the diet of many Akan people—and to salute the Akan chief who, it is said, risked his life by tasting this unknown food before others in his chiefdom. The yam festival is considered vital to the group's survival, and it serves important social functions—it defines the group, symbolizes its unity, and reminds people of their obligations to others.

Religion among the Kru peoples of the southwest resembles that of the Akan, with an important difference in the presence of a second powerful deity alongside the creator. This second god is an evil deity or devil, who works against the creator god, producing a duality that is an important theme in Kru culture. All individuals exhibit a balance of good and evil, in this view, and maintaining this balance is important both to the individual and to the entire universe.

=== Religions of the North ===
Northern religions contain the notion of dual deities found in the southwest, although the two often complement rather than oppose each other. Ancestral spirits are especially important, because it is believed that they can directly influence an individual's fortunes in this life.

The cosmology of the Mandé peoples of the northwest is described in their myth of origin, variants of which are retold throughout the region. The myth recounts God's creation of the universe and of four sets of twins from seeds. They were commanded to populate the earth and teach their offspring how to grow crops. They used the first music to plead for rain, and the Niger River was formed from the resulting series of floods. Each area along the river is associated with a wild animal that either prevented the sowing of seeds or protected the fields. Features of the river and surrounding terrain are also associated with activities of the first ancestors, reinforcing the bond between the group's spiritual existence and the land—a bond that has confused foreign missionaries, government officials, and development workers in recent decades.

In Lobi society in the northeast, divination is important as a means of determining the cause of death, disease, or other misfortune. Diviners do not predict the future; rather, they prescribe a course of action that emphasizes accepted social values in an effort to help people cope with present-day dilemmas. The diviner's role is similar to that of a counselor or confessor, who reminds people of the need to maintain proper relationships with all beings and provides them with a new perspective on relationships that have gone wrong.

Secret societies are found in several areas of northern Ivory Coast. They serve important functions in the initiation and education of the young, and they provide vehicles for preserving beliefs about the past. Senior members are responsible for ritual instruction of new members and for the observance of funerals and ceremonies to ensure agricultural prosperity. Blacksmiths have secret societies of their own, and in some areas this occupational group is believed to have special spiritual powers. Medical and ritual specialists also undergo apprenticeships with established practitioners, thereby reinforcing their status.

== World religions ==
=== Islam ===
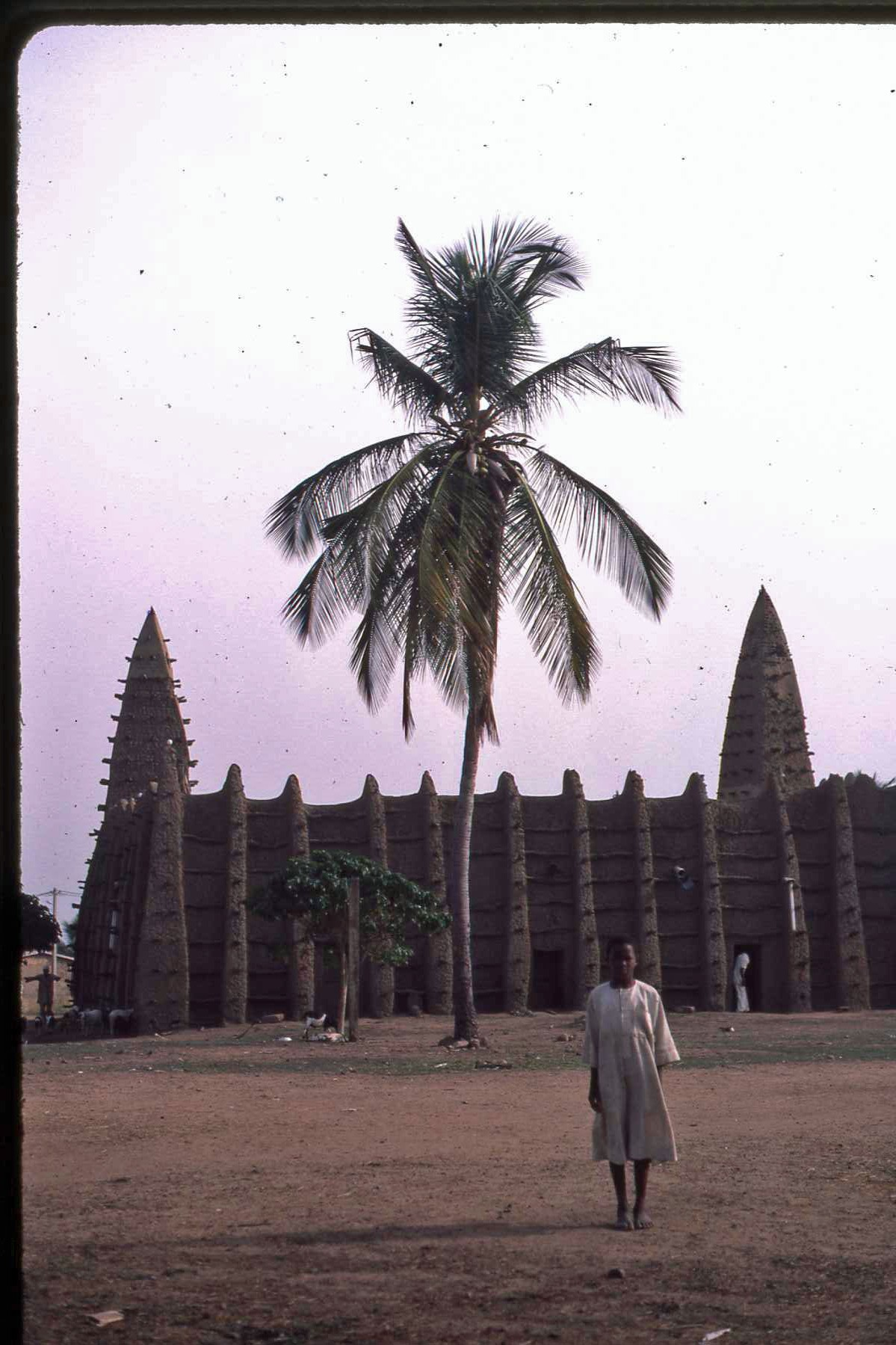
A mosque with a Sahelian architectural style in Kong

Most Ivoirian Muslims are Sunni, following the Maliki school of Islamic law. Sufism, involving the organization of mystical brotherhoods (tariqa) for the purification and spread of Islam, is also widespread, laced with indigenous beliefs and practices. Muslims primarily reside in the North of the country. Many also live in towns like Abidjan, Bouake and Yamoussoukro. Huge number of Muslims belong to Mande speaking ethnic groups people like the Dyula and Gur speaking people like the Mossi. The four major Sufi brotherhoods are all represented in Ivory Coast, although the Qadiriya, founded in the eleventh century, and the Tidjaniya, founded in the eighteenth century, are most popular. The Qadiriya is prevalent in the west, and the Tidjaniya, in the east. The other two major Islamic brotherhoods have few adherents in Ivory Coast. The Senoussiya is identified with Libya, where its influence is substantial. The Ahmadiyya, a sect originating in nineteenth-century India, is the only non-Sunni order in Ivory Coast.

The significant religious authority is the marabout. He is believed to be a miracle worker, a physician, and a mystic, who exercises both magical and moral authority. He is also respected as a dispenser of amulets, which protect the wearer—Muslim or non-Muslim—against evil. The influence of marabouts has produced a number of reactions in Ivoirian society, among them a series of reformist movements inspired by Wahhabist puritanism, which originated in nineteenth-century Saudi Arabia. These reform movements often condemn Sufism and marabouts as un-Islamic.

Hamallism began as an Islamic reform movement in the French Sudan early in the twentieth century, and has provided a channel for expressing political and religious discontent. Its founder, Hamallah, was exiled from the French Sudan to Ivory Coast during the 1930s. He preached Islamic reform tempered by tolerance of many local practices, but he condemned many aspects of Sufism. Orthodox brotherhoods were able to convince the French authorities in Ivory Coast that Hamallah had been responsible for earlier political uprisings in the French Sudan. Authorities then expelled Hamallah from Ivory Coast and banned his teachings.

According to the 2021 census, about 42.5% of the population is Muslim, making Islam the largest religion in the country. Between the 2014 and 2021 censuses, the Muslim share of the population slightly decreased from 42.9% to 42.5%. This coincides with the declining share of foreign migrant workers, most of whom being Muslim.

=== Christianity ===
The Cathédrale Saint-Augustin in Yamoussoukro.

About one-eighth of the population was Christian in the 1980s; more recent census put the Christian population at about 39.8% of the population. In general, Christianity is practiced by the middle class and in urban centers of the south. It is most prevalent among the Agni and Lagoon cultures of the southeast, least so among the Mandé of the northwest. Catholicism is the largest Christian denomination, but Methodist, Baptist, and a number of smaller mission churches also exist.

Between the 2014 and 2021 censuses, the Christian share of the population increased from 33.9% to 39.8%.

==== Roman Catholicism ====
Interior of the Basilica of Our Lady of Peace in Yamoussoukro.

About 17% of the population is Catholic. Catholicism made a brief appearance in Ivory Coast in the mid-seventeenth century and reappeared two centuries later when French missionaries began to work among the Agni. The first African Catholic mission in Ivory Coast was established in 1895, and the first African priest was ordained in 1934. In the 1980s, the Catholic Church operated seminaries and schools throughout the country. Although Ivory Coast is officially a secular state, the president expressed pride in Abidjan's large Catholic cathedral and alone funded construction of a basilica at Yamoussoukro, his birthplace, by 1990. Some villages have also adopted patron saints, whom they honor on both secular and religious holidays.

=== Baháʼí Faith ===
The Baháʼí Faith was first established in the country in the 1950s and given a push in 1990 of the arrival of about 200 Liberian refugees, by 1993 there was a small community of around 1000 Baháʼís living under the guidance of 25 local spiritual assemblies in Ivory Coast.

=== Hinduism ===
Hinduism has a small presence in the country.

The Ananda Marga runs a school in Abidjan. There is a Brahmakumari Ashram and a Satya Saibaba Group in Abidjan. The International Society for Krishna Consciousness (ISKCON) has a presence in this country.

There are about 250 families of Indians in Ivory Coast, most of them businessmen of Sindhi and Gujarati origin, professionals in trading and manufacturing companies owned by NRI-PIOs and officials working with the UN.

== Syncretic religions ==
Both Islam and Christianity have been adapted to indigenous religions in a variety of ways. Beyond these localized versions of world religions, however, are complex systems of belief and practice that incorporate many elements of more than one religion. Most widely recognized among these syncretic religions are numerous offshoots of Harrism along the coast, where new prophets, preachers, and disciples blend traditional beliefs, Harrism, and modern-day political advice to help deal with the problems of everyday life.

Syncretic religions are generally more common among minorities in a particular area or among groups that perceive themselves to be resisting political domination by their neighbors. The Agni have remained heavily Catholic, for example, whereas the neighboring Baoulé have evolved a variety of syncretisms, following prophets that promise good fortune as a reward for allegiance to them. Small groups in the far northeast have also evolved a variety of belief systems to maintain their traditions, incorporate selected aspects of Islam, and resist domination by outsiders.

== Relations between religions ==
Religious communities generally coexist peacefully. No world religion has been embraced by a majority of people. Conversions have been an individual matter in most cases, and many families include Muslims and Christians living together. Religious tolerance is also part of government policy. The president personally contributes to the cost of building mosques and churches, and he encourages both Muslims and Christians to assist in projects undertaken by other religious communities. Religious practitioners have also earned substantial goodwill through the services they offer their communities, especially in health and education, and by their overall contribution to social harmony.

The Constitution calls for a secular state, although this is not interpreted as strict separation of church and state. Officials often attend religious ceremonies as representatives of the state, and some mission schools receive government aid. Missionaries are generally welcomed throughout the nation, although their teachings seldom replace centuries-old systems of spiritual belief and practice that form the basis of cultural unity.

== Demographics ==
=== Census data ===
Religions at censuses (excluding the 'Not stated' category)
RELIGION	1975		1998		2014		2021	
Animists	30.2%		12.0%		3.6%		2.2%	
Christians	29.0%		30.6%		33.9%		39.8%	
Christians	Catholics: 22.2%	Other Christians: 6.8%	Catholics: 19.5%	Other Christians: 11.1%	Catholics: 17.2%	Other Christians: 16.7%	Catholics: 17.0%	Other Christians: 22.8%
Muslims	33.5%		38.9%		42.9%		42.5%	
Not religious	6.2%		16.8%		19.1%		12.6%	
Other religions	1.1%		1.7%		0.5%		2.9%	
Sources: 1975 and 1998 censuses,2014 census, 2021 census.

=== Other estimations ===
Year	Islam	Catholic	Protestant	Traditional/Animist	Without religion	Others
1994 (DHS estimates)	32.6%	24.1%	18.4%	5.7%	19.2%	
1998-99 (DHS estimates)	34.7%	24.3%	16.3%			24.7%
2005 (DHS estimates)	37.1%	21.1%	12.0 + 12.9 (other Christians) %			16.9%
2014-15 (DHS estimates)	40.2%	20.4%	26.3 (all other Christians) %			14.2%

== See also ==
- Abonsam
- History of the Jews in Ivory Coast
