= Titus Awotwi Pratt =

Ghanaian Methodist minister

The Most Reverend Titus Awotwi Pratt

Presiding Bishop, Methodist Church Ghana
- In office 1 October 2015 – 1 October 2018

Personal details
- Born: 5 December 1947 (age 78) Ghana
- Relations: Charles Awotwi Pratt (father)
- Education: Komenda College; Trinity Theological Seminary, Legon
- Occupation: Educator; Methodist minister

Titus Awotwi Pratt is a Ghanaian educationist and minister. He was the Presiding Bishop of the Methodist Church Ghana. He has served as the head of the Methodist Church in The Gambia as well as the Bishop of Accra. He spent the early years of his ministry as an assistant minister at Roundhay Methodist Church in Leeds, United Kingdom.

== Early life and education ==
Titus Awortwi Pratt was born to Charles Awotwi Pratt and Grace Awotwi Pratt on 5 December 1947. He was the sixth out of ten children born to his parents. His father was also a Methodist minister and served as the forth president of the autonomous Methodist Church Ghana in 1977. Awortwi Pratt had his basic and secondary education at Wesley Grammar School in Accra. He was awarded his professional teacher's certificate after three years of training at Komenda Teachers Training College.

== Methodist minister ==
Pratt attended the Trinity Theological Seminary at Legon in 1973. He was commissioned as a Methodist minister upon successful completion of his training in 1977. His father, who was the head of the Methodist Church at the time of his graduation, commissioned him. Pratt's first ministry station was as a Chaplain at Fijai Secondary School in Sekondi in 1977. After his probation as a minister, he was ordained as a full minister of the Methodist Church Ghana in 1979.

He spent the next three years after his probation as an assistant minister at Roundhay Methodist Church, Ladywood, Leeds, and later at Manchester and Salford Circuit. He returned to Ghana in 1982 to serve as Chaplain of Prempeh College. Subsequent ministerial postings sent him to several other churches and circuits including Kumasi, Ajumako, and Cape Coast.

== Work in The Gambia ==
In late 1980s, Awortwi Pratt was sent to serve as a Ghanaian Superintendent minister in the newly formed district of the Methodist Church Ghana in The Gambia. He served as Synod Secretary of the Gambia District Synod till 1994. He was eventually elected as Chairman and General Superintendent of the Methodist Mission in the country. His reign as the Head of the Gambian mission ended in 2003 when he was recalled to Ghana.

== Bishop of Accra ==
He served as Superintendent Minister of the Dansoman Circuit and later the Kwashieman Circuit both in the Accra Diocese of the Methodist Church Ghana. In 2011 Pratt was elected the Methodist Bishop of Accra. In 2015, with two years to go until the end of his term as Bishop of Accra, he was elected the Presiding Bishop of the Methodist Church Ghana.

== Presiding Bishop ==
During the Methodist Church Conference of 2014, Pratt was elected as Presiding Bishop of the church. He obtained 198 votes versus the 131 votes polled by the runner-up, Paul Boafo, the chaplain at the Kwame Nkrumah University of Science and Technology. He was inducted into office on 1 October 2015. He replaced Emmanuel Asante who had ended his six-year term as presiding bishop. Pratt became the fourth person to occupy the position since the church begun the episcopal system in the year 2000. His election to the high office of Presiding Bishop marked the first time a father and son had headed the church since 1835. As presiding bishop, he oversees all activities of church evangelism, growth and expansion. He is also a member of the clergy advisory team which meets with the President of Ghana to advise him on various matters.
