= Komenda-Edina-Eguafo-Abirem (Ghana parliament constituency) =

Constituency in the Central Region of Ghana

Komenda-Edina-Eguafo-Abbrem
- constituency for the Parliament of Ghana
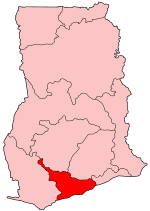
- District: Komenda/Edina/Eguafo/Abirem District
- Region: Central Region of Ghana

Current constituency
- Party: National Democratic Congress
- MP: Samuel Atta Mills

Komenda-Edina-Eguafo-Abbrem is one of the constituencies represented in the Parliament of Ghana. It elects one Member of Parliament (MP) by the first past the post system of election. Komenda-Edina-Eguafo-Abbrem is located in the Komenda/Edina/Eguafo/Abirem district of the Central Region of Ghana.

== Boundaries ==
The seat is located entirely within the Komenda/Edina/Eguafo/Abirem district of the Central Region of Ghana. Both the district and the constituency share common borders. It is in the south western corner of the region. It shares its northern and western borders with the Western Region of Ghana. To the north east is the Hemang Lower Denkyira constituency and to the east, the Cape Coast constituency. The Atlantic Ocean or Gulf of Guinea is to the south.

== Members of Parliament ==
Election	Member	Party	Ref
1992			
1996	Ato Quarshie	National Democratic Congress	
2004	Paa Kwesi Nduom	Convention People's Party	
2008	Dr Joseph Samuel Annan	National Democratic Congress	
2012	Dr Stephen Nana Ato Arthur	New Patriotic Party	

== Elections ==
2008 Ghanaian parliamentary election: Komenda-Edina-Eguafo-Abbrem Source:Ghana Home Page
Party	Candidate	Votes	%	±%
National Democratic Congress	Dr Joseph Samuel Annan	22,746	48.8	+15.6
New Patriotic Party	Stephen Nana Ato Arthur	19,288	41.4	
Convention People's Party	Joachim Bruku Eshun	4,545	9.8	−57.0
Majority		3,468	6.4	—
Turnout				—

As Paa Kwesi Nduom, who was a Minister of state in the New Patriotic Party Kufuor government was contesting the elections, the NPP decided not to field a candidate in this constituency but to back Nduom of the CPP instead.

2004 Ghanaian parliamentary election: Komenda-Edina-Eguafo-Abbrem Source:National Electoral Commission, Ghana - Page 145
Party	Candidate	Votes	%	±%
Convention People's Party	Paa Kwesi Nduom	30,981	66.8	23.1
National Democratic Congress	Veronica Essuman Nelson	15,427	33.2	−13.1
Majority		15,554	33.6%	—
Turnout		47,347	86.2%	—

2000 Ghanaian parliamentary election: Komenda-Edina-Eguafo-Abbrem Source:Adam Carr's Election Archives
Party	Candidate	Votes	%	±%
National Democratic Congress	Ato Quarshie	16,908	46.3	—
Convention People's Party	Paa Kwesi Nduom	15,941	43.7	—
New Patriotic Party	George Manso-Howard	3,477	9.5	—
People's National Convention	John K. Assifuah-Nunoo	178	0.5	—
Majority		967	2.6	—
Turnout		36,504	59.4%	—

== See also ==
- List of Ghana Parliament constituencies
- Komenda/Edina/Eguafo/Abirem District
