= Ato Quarshie =

Ghanaian politician

Member of parliament for Komenda-Edina-Eguafo-Abirem Constituency
- In office 7 January 2000 – 6 January 2005
- Preceded by: John Kufuor

Member of parliament for Komenda-Edina-Eguafo-Abirem Constituency
- In office 7 January 1993 – 6 January 1997
- Preceded by: John Jerry Rawlings

Member of parliament for Komenda-Edina-Eguafo-Abirem Constituency
- In office 7 January 1997 – 6 January 2001
- President: John Jerry Rawlings

Personal details
- Born: 28 October 1944 ElminaKomenda, Central Region, Ghana
- Died: 26 April 2019 (aged 74)
- Party: National Democratic Congress
- Occupation: Politician
- Profession: Minister

Dr Ato Quarshie is a Ghanaian politician and a former member of the First, Second and Third Parliament of the Fourth Republic of Ghana representing the Komenda Edina Constituency in the Central Region of Ghana.

== Early life and education ==
Quarshie was born in Komeda in the Central Region of Ghana. He attended University of Hohenheim where he obtained his Bachelor of Science, Master of Science, and Doctor of Philosophy degrees in Agricultural Economics, Agricultural Economics, Development Economics respectively.

== Politics ==
Quarshie was first elected into Parliament during the December 1992 Ghanaian General Elections on the ticket of the National Democratic Congress for the Komenda Edina Constituency in the Central Region of Ghana.

In 1996, he polled 26,671 votes out of the 42,444 valid votes cast representing 49.80% against Catherine B.Aubyn a CPP member who polled 14,083 votes, Benjamin Kweku Prah a PNC member who polled 1,690 votes and Francis William Boham who also polled 0 votes.

He polled 16,903 votes out of the 36,499 valid votes cast representing 46.30% in the 2000 Ghanaian general elections. Other persons contested with him to win the Komenda Edina constituency seat. These persons represented their respective political parties in the elections. Dr. Paa Kwesi Nduom of the CPP won 15,941 votes, George Manso Howard of the NPP won 3,477 votes, the PNC won 178 votes which was represented by John K. Assifuah-Nunoo and Robert Mensah Emmanuel of the NRP won 0 votes.

Dr. Quarshie retained the seat three consecutive times from 1992 to 2000 until he lost in 2004 party primary elections. In the year 2012, Dr Ato Quarshie, a founding member of the National Democratic Congress (NDC) was asked by the people of Komenda Edina Eguafo Abirem (KEEA) to contest for the 2012 parliamentary election as an independent candidate. This was attributed to the Dr J.S. Annan, the incumbent MP's ineffectiveness, and who opted to run for a second term on the NDC ticket.Dr. Ato Quarshie defeated incumbent MP Dr. J.S. Annan in the 2012 election, however NDC votes were split between two NDC candidates allowing Dr. Ato Arthur of the National Party (NPP) to win the KEEA parliamentary seat.

== Career ==
Quarshie was the former Minister for Roads and Highways. He is also the member of Parliament for the Komenda Edina Constituency in the Central Region from 1992 to 2005.
