= Islam in Ivory Coast =

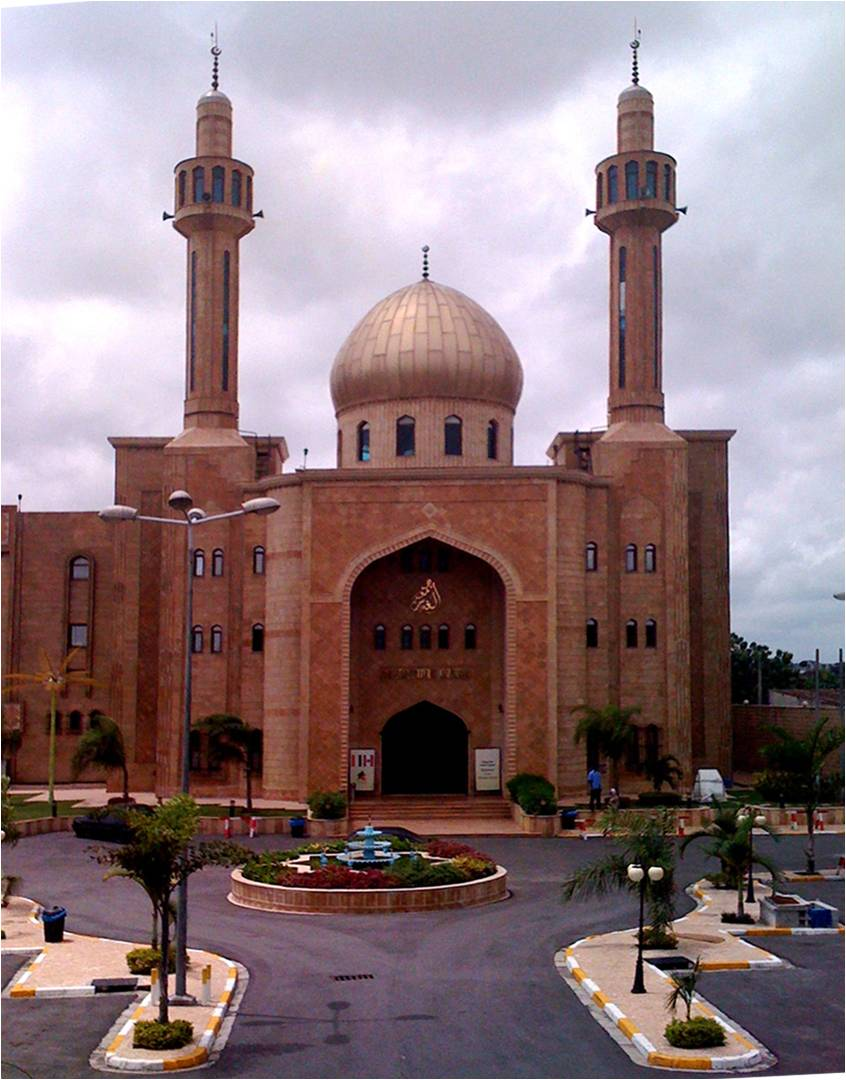
Central mosque in Marcory.

Islam is the first Abrahamic monotheistic religion to have reached present-day Ivory Coast, primarily through trans-Saharan trade routes and the influence of Muslim merchants and scholars from neighboring regions. As of the 2021 national census, 42.5% of the population identify as Muslim.

By the late 1980s, levels of religious observance among Ivorian Muslims varied. While many engaged in core practices such as daily prayer, fasting during Ramadan, and almsgiving (zakat), the pilgrimage to Mecca (Hajj) was generally accessible only to those with the necessary financial resources.

The majority of Ivorian Muslims adhere to Sunni Islam, particularly the Maliki school of jurisprudence. Sufism also holds a notable presence in the country, particularly through organized tariqas (Sufi brotherhoods), which combine Islamic mysticism with localized cultural traditions. Among these, the Qadiriyya (widespread in the west) and Tijaniyya (prevalent in the east) are the most prominent. The Senoussiya and other smaller Sufi orders have fewer followers. The Ahmadiyya Muslim Community maintains a small but visible presence in the country.

A significant figure within Ivorian Islamic culture is the marabout—a religious leader often seen as a healer, spiritual guide, and provider of protective amulets. While many view marabouts with reverence, especially among poorer communities, some Islamic reform movements have criticized certain Sufi and marabout practices as being inconsistent with orthodox Islamic teachings.

One such reformist current is Hamallism, which emerged in the early 20th century in French Sudan (present-day Mali). Its founder, Shaykh Hamallah, was exiled to Ivory Coast in the 1930s. While advocating for Islamic reform, he showed tolerance for select local customs but was critical of Sufism. His movement was eventually banned by colonial authorities under pressure from rival religious factions.

The demographic growth of Islam in Ivory Coast was further reinforced by migration from neighboring Muslim-majority countries, especially Burkina Faso and Mali.

Estimates regarding Shia Muslim representation in Ivory Coast vary. According to the Pew Research Center, Shia Muslims constitute less than 1% of the Muslim population, whereas the Imam Husayn (as) Encyclopedia suggests the figure may be closer to 5%.

- Religion in Ivory Coast
