= Charles Awotwi Pratt =

Ghanaian Methodist minister

Charles Awotwi Pratt was a Ghanaian theologian and priest. He served as the fourth chairman of the Methodist Church Ghana from 1977 to 1981. He was the father of the Titus Awotwi Pratt, the Presiding Bishop of the Methodist Church Ghana from 2014 to 2018.
