= Victor Kusi Boateng =

Ghanaian theologian

- Born: 7 September 1971 (age 55); Kumasi, Ghana
- Spouse: Anita Kusi Boateng
- Children: 4 Breanna; Beyonce; Victor Brian; Breindelle

Ecclesiastical career
- Religion: Christianity
- Church: Power Chapel Worldwide
- Congregations: Power Chapel Worldwide kumasi
- Offices held: Head Pastor, Power Chapel Worldwide
- Title: Founder, Power Chapel Worldwide; Head Pastor

Victor Kusi Boateng (born September 7, 1971) is a Ghanaian theologian, philanthropist, motivational speaker. He is the founder of Power Chapel Worldwide, headquartered in Kumasi, Ghana. He has spoken internationally at various conferences and churches.

== Personal life ==
Victor Kusi Boateng was born on September 7, 1971, in the Ashanti Region of Ghana. He is married to Anita, and they have four children.

He started the Power Chapel Worldwide in Kumasi with the help of his spiritual father, Archbishop Nicholas Duncan Williams in the Ashanti Region of Ghana.

He is spiritual father to many men of God across Africa including popular Zimbabwe prophet Emmanuel Makandiwa of UFIC church in Chitungwiza,Zimbabwe. Victor Boateng has been present for the official opening of Emmanuel Makandiwa church building and many other conferences including the Jesus Conference held in August of 2026 during the church's 18th annivessary.

Victor Kusi Boateng currently serves as the Head Pastor of the Power Chapel Ministries and has been awarded for his work in various fields. He was awarded the Africa Legendary Awards, and in February 2018, he was listed as the 9th most influential pastor on social media.

He currently serves as the Secretary of the Board of Trustees of the failed National Cathedral Project in Ghana.

== Philanthropist ==
Boateng along with his VKB ministries, has over the years donated to orphanages and other institutions.

== Publications ==
Boateng has published several books, including:

- Blood for blood
- Wisdom Capsules for Survival
- Manasseh before Ephraim
