= Wesley Methodist Cathedral (Accra) =

Methodist church in Accra

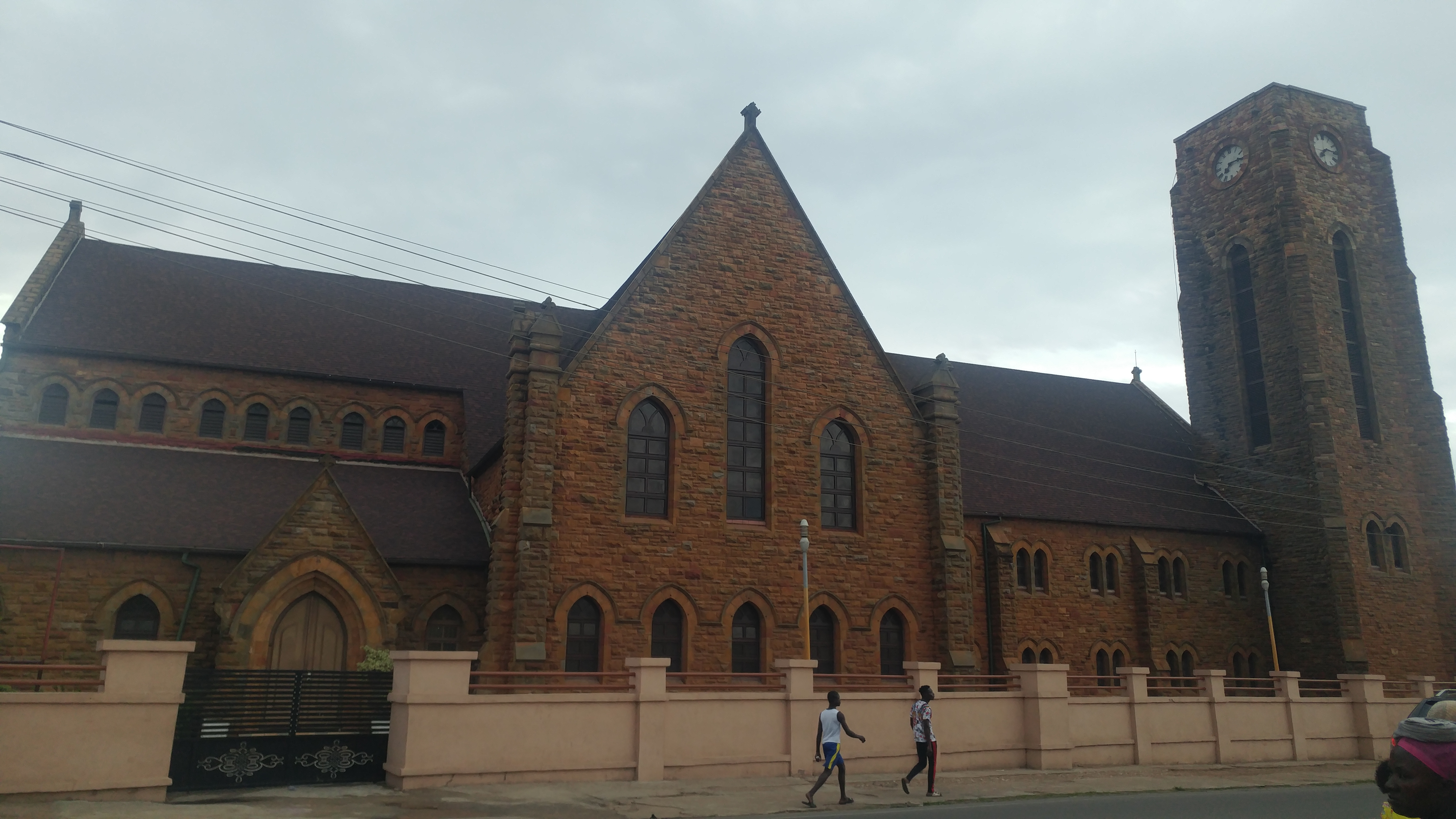
- Wesley Methodist Cathedral in Accra, Ghana
- Wesley Methodist Cathedral
- Country: Ghana
- Denomination: Methodist
- Website: Wesley Methodist Cathedral

History
- Status: Cathedral
- Founded: 1922; 104 years ago
- Dedicated: 1960

Architecture
- Functional status: Active

The Wesley Methodist Cathedral is a church in Accra, the capital of Ghana.

The church lies on Asafoatse Nettey Road, in Adedainkpo, a district of the Jamestown area of the city. It was designed by W. F. Hedges. Construction began in 1922, with Frederick Gordon Guggisberg laying the foundation stone, although it was not dedicated until 1960.

In 2000, the church was made a cathedral, part of the Methodist Church Ghana. It is the seat of both the Bishop of Accra, and of the Presiding Bishop of Ghana.
