= Emmanuel Asante (theologian) =

Ghanaian theologian

Emmanuel Asante is a Ghanaian academic, theologian and priest. He served as the third Presiding Bishop of the Methodist Church Ghana from 2009 to 2015. He is the chairman of the Ghana Peace Council.

In 2022, United Nations Secretary-General António Guterres appointed Asante to the ten-member Advisory Group of the United Nations Peacebuilding Fund for a term of two years.
