= Wesley Methodist Cathedral (Kumasi) =

Cathedral in Kumasi, Ghana

Coordinates: 6.69361°N 1.62333°W

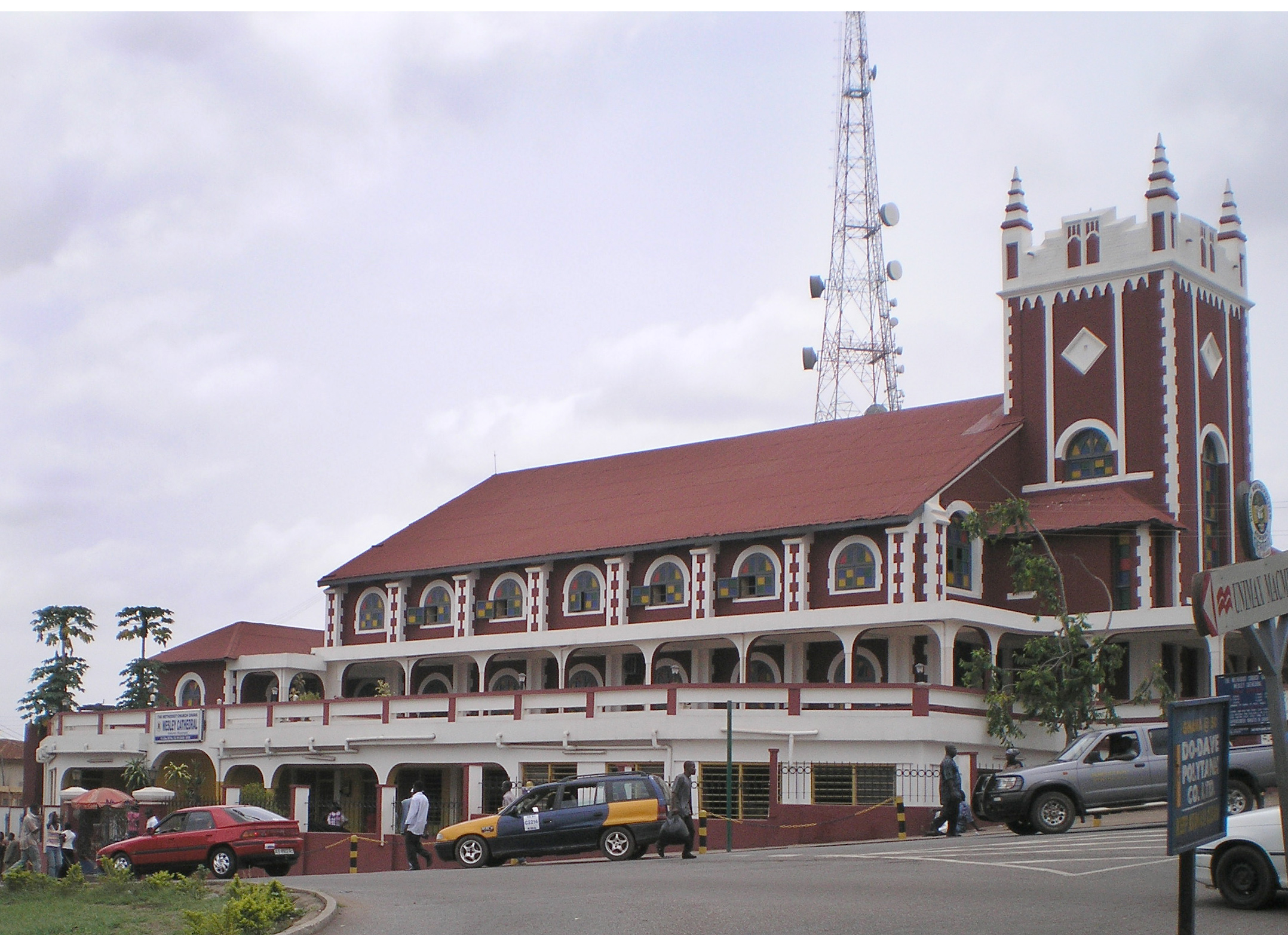
- Wesley Methodist Cathedral, Kumasi

Religion
- Affiliation: Methodist Church Ghana
- Leadership: The Right Reverend Professor Emmanuel Kwaku Asante
- Status: Active

Location
- Location: Kumasi, Ghana
- Interactive map of Wesley Methodist Cathedral

Architecture
- Type: Cathedral

Wesley Methodist Cathedral is a Methodist cathedral located in Kumasi, Ghana. Wesley is the largest Methodist church in the area, and is the center of the episcopal area in Adum, Kumasi. The cathedral is named after John Wesley, one of the founders of the Methodist church.
