= Nana Ato Arthur =

Ghanaian politician

- Born: December 24, 1961 (age 64)
- Known for: Parliament
- Children: 3

Nana Ato Arthur is the member of parliament for Komenda-Edina-Ehuafo-Abirem in the Central region of Ghana.

== Personal life ==
Nana is married with three children and is a Christian (Catholic).

== Early life and education ==
Nana was born on 24 December 1961 in Abrem Berase in the Central region. He earned an MSc in Development Planning and Management from KNUST and a PG Dip in Regional Planning and Management from Universitat Dortmund in Germany. He also obtained a BSc in Eng from South China Agricultural University in Guangzhou, China, and a PhD in Development Studies from the Centre for Development Research at the University of Bonn, Germany, in 2012.

== Politics ==
Nana is a member of the New Patriotic Party. He served as Regional Minister of the Central Regional Coordinating Council in Cape Coast from May 2006 to January 2009, Deputy regional Minister from May 2005 to May 2006, and DCE of the Komenda-Edina-Eguafo-Abrem District Assembly in Elmina from March 2001 to May 2005.

== Employment ==
He was an Engineer at the Ghana Irrigation Development Authority (GIDA) in Accra from March 1991 to December 1998, and a Management Consultant at the State Enterprises Commission in Accra from December 1998 to March 2001. He is the current Vice-president of the Commonwealth Association for Public Administration and Management (CAPAM),
