= Abonsam =

Abonsam is the name of a malevolent spirit from the Gold Coast region of West Africa and Ghana. When accidents, disease, etc. afflict an area and local shamans have determined that Abonsam is to blame, the spirit is driven into the sea in a ritual that begins with four weeks of total silence, followed by removing all furniture from the homes involved. The interior of the homes are then beaten with sticks, and loud noises are created by shouting and gun fire.
