= Methodist Church Ghana =

Protestant denomination in Ghana

The Methodist Church Ghana
- The Methodist Church Ghana logo
- Classification: Methodist
- Orientation: Mainline
- Scripture: Holy Bible
- Theology: Wesleyanism
- Polity: Episcopal (Connexionalism)
- Associations: Christian Council of Ghana; All Africa Conference of Churches; World Council of Churches
- Region: Ghana
- Founder: John Wesley
- Origin: 1 January 1835 190 years ago Cape Coast, Ghana
- Branched from: Methodist Church of Great Britain
- Official website: www.methodistchurch.org.gh

The Methodist Church Ghana is one of the largest and oldest mainline Protestant denominations in Ghana. It traces its roots back to the landing of the Rev. Joseph Dunwell on 1 January 1835 in Cape Coast, in the Gold Coast (now Ghana). The Rev. T. B. Freeman, another missionary, took the Christian message beyond Cape Coast to the Ashanti Empire, to Nigeria, and to other parts of the region to become the father of Methodism in West Africa.

For the most part, The Methodist Church Ghana follows the same Sunday worship practices as other Methodist Church branches. The Methodist Church Ghana separates itself from the mainline Methodist Church of Great Britain in approach through the addition of Charismatic elements to the worship services. This approach to worship displays a more vibrant and energetic form of praise.

The Methodist Church Ghana is responsible for a large part of its community's outreach. Like many other mainline Protestant churches, the church provides formal education through schooling for Ghanaians. This educational role for Methodist Church Ghana in particular has helped the country provide a strong educational system that can accommodate the Ghanaian population, which is pivotal because the options for university in Ghana are scarce and competitive.

The Methodist Church Ghana is a big medical care provider in its area, as well. The medical work done by The Methodist Church Ghana has served a vast part of the local community by offering important health services to Ghanaians. The Methodist Church Ghana also took initiative to remodel and reconstruct a local hospital to broaden its outreach and possibilities for medical care for its community.

Ethnic divisions plagued the administration of The Methodist Church Ghana in the past but this has been addressed. These problems arose from differences in ethnicity regarding power positions and church format. For instance, during an election for the presidency of the denomination in the 1980s, people were vouching for their own ethnic president and a conflict of interest between some ethnic groups occurred.

== History ==
In the mid-1800s many European missionaries traveled to new countries to spread religious influences. Gold Coast (now Ghana) was already known for its big reserves of gold and as a major port for the trans-Atlantic slave trade. The Asante people ruled large portions of Gold Coast, and in 1824 British forces invaded and defeated many Asante forces. This shifted the Gold Coast towards British control, subjecting the current citizens to British influence. By 1835, many other European nations had taken an interest in the resources of the land. This brought many missionaries, including Protestants from the Netherlands and Catholics from Portugal and France. As part of this wave of missions, the Missionary Committee of the British Methodist Conference sent Rev. Joseph Rhodes Dunwell to be the first Methodist missionary in Gold Coast. His mission began in 1835 in the prominent fishing city of Cape Coast. After six months of mission work with local Christians, he succeeded in his evangelical missions and Methodist Church Gold Coast (Methodist Church Ghana after independence was gained in 1957) was founded. This influence spread throughout the country, and as a result the British claimed Gold Coast as a colony in 1867.

By 1854, the church was organized into circuits, a collection of ambient Methodist churches that formed an administrative coalition, forming a district, or an area with Methodist control; T. B. Freeman served as chairman. Freeman was replaced in 1856 by William West. The district was divided and extended to include areas in Gold Coast and Nigeria, also a British colony at the time, by the synod, an administrative church council, in 1878, a move confirmed at the British Conference. The districts were Gold Coast District, with T. R. Picot as chairman, and Yoruba and Popo District, with John Milum as chairman. Methodist evangelisation of Northern Gold Coast began in 1910.

After serving as a district in the British Methodist Conference, The Methodist Church Ghana attained full independence from that British body on 28 July 1961. It adopted an episcopal structure at the Koforidua Conference in August 1999. Currently, The Methodist Church Ghana has 22 dioceses headed by bishops. Between 2003 and March 2008, 406 new congregations were started and ministry was initiated in the neighboring country of Burkina Faso.

The current presiding bishop is the Most Reverend Prof. J Asamoah Gyedu the sixth presiding bishop and the thirteen person to lead The Methodist Church Ghana. The administrative bishop is the Right Reverend Dr Mpere Gyekye , and the lay president is Mr. Kwesi Atta Antwi.

Emmanuel Asante and Araba Ata Sam shortly after their elections as presiding bishop and lay president at the Winneba Conference in 2008

Kow Egyir as the Administrative Bishop leads in liturgy as the College of Bishops looks on

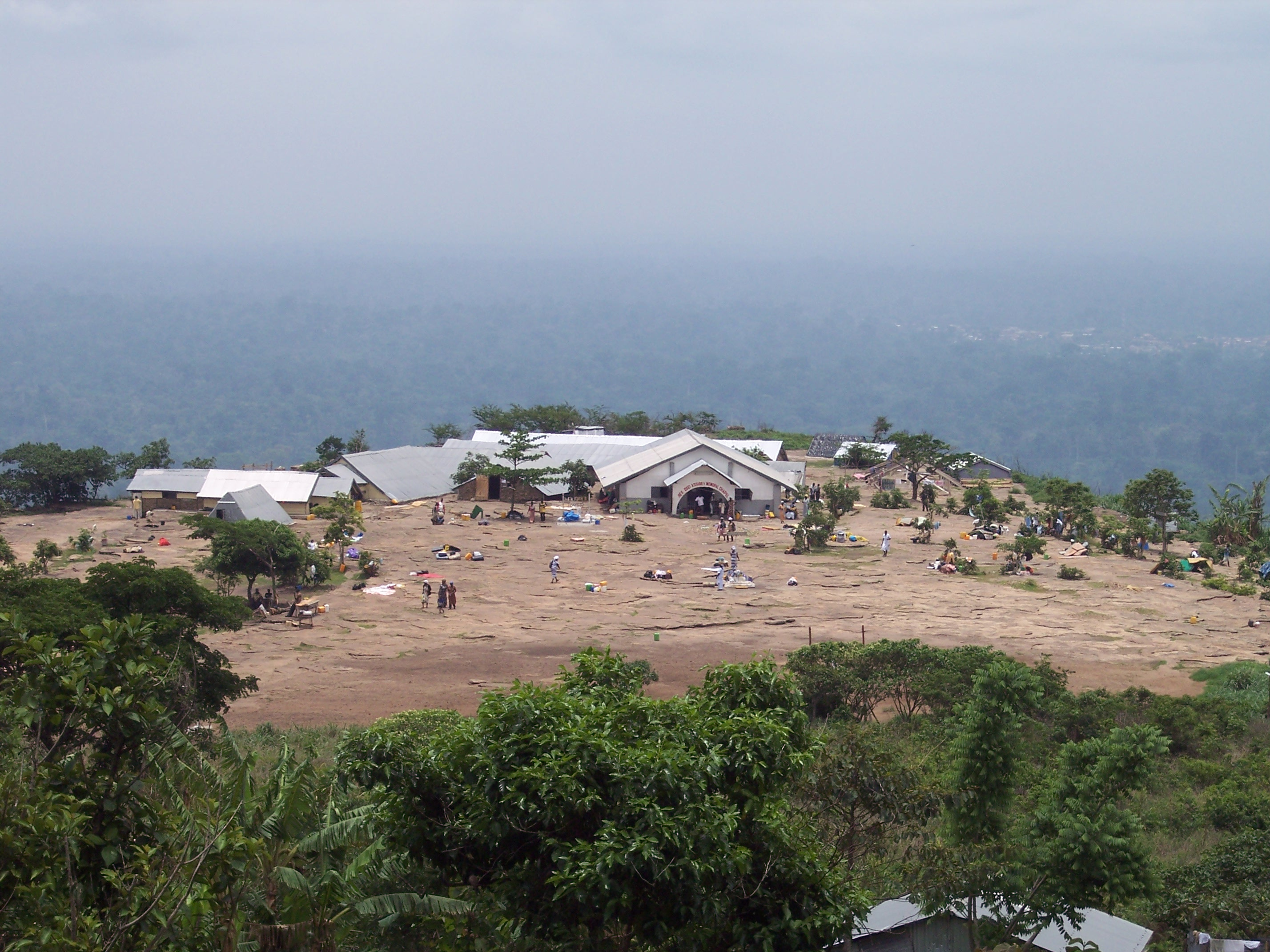
Abasua Methodist Prayer Camp

Missions Conference held in Kumasi, 2008

Wesley House, The Headquarters of the Methodist Church Ghana, Accra

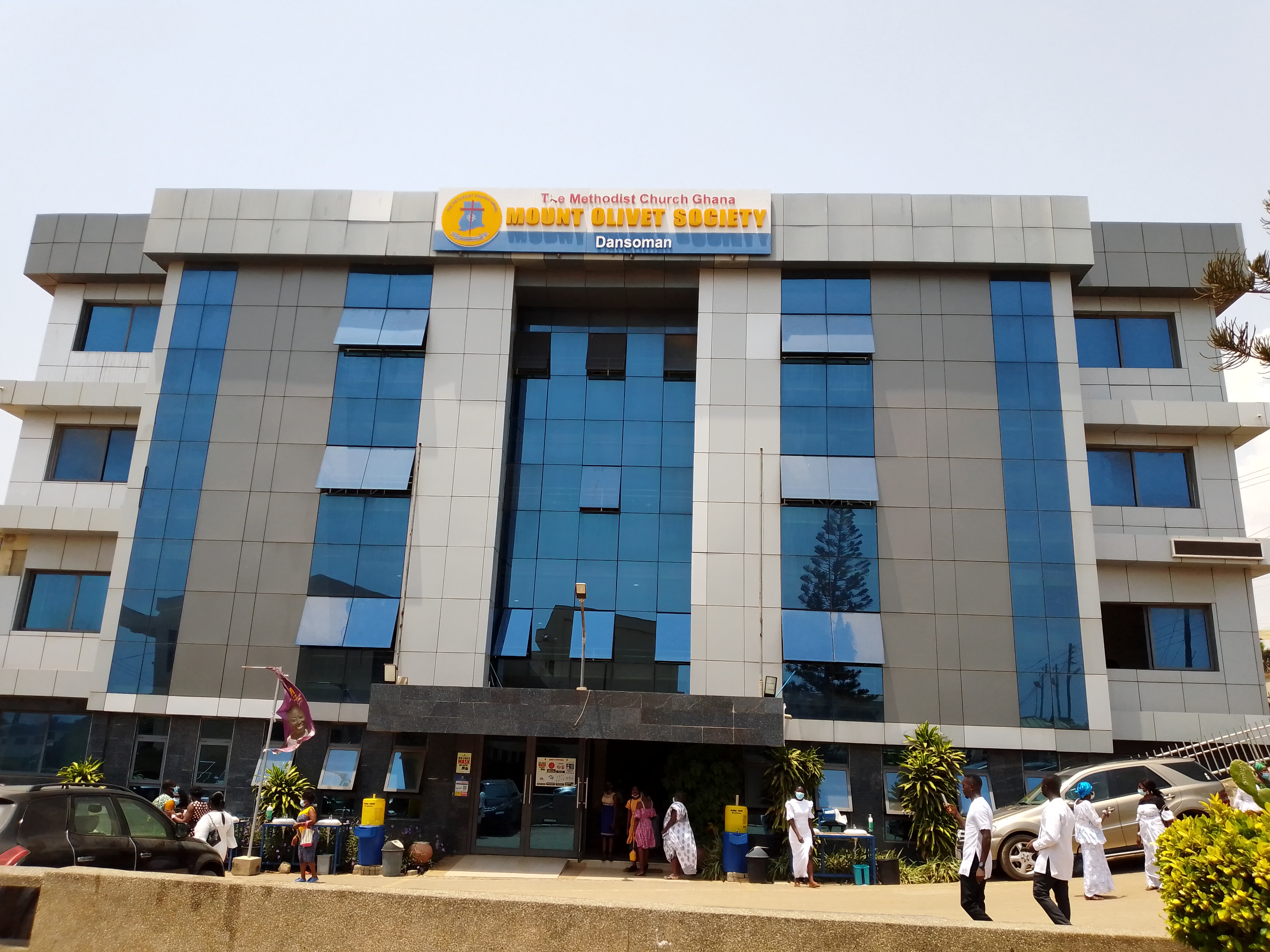
Mount Olivet Methodist Church in Dansoman

== Practices ==
The practices of The Methodist Church Ghana mostly mirror those common among other Methodist churches. Sunday mornings are typically worship services. These services are where the Bible is read, sermons are given, and offerings are donated to the church. There can also be a first and second service, where the difference is one service uses English and the other service uses the native language of the area.

The Methodist Church Ghana uses the same hymn book that is approved and used by the British Methodist church. Some time in the 1990s, the Kumasi Metropolitan Assembly translated the English hymns into the now used and locally understood Twi-language version. Following this change, multiple Methodist churches in Ghana translated the main British hymns into their own native languages, including Ewe and Ga. The Methodist Church was the first to add native songs to praise and worship services in Ghana.

The first liturgy accepted was a 1936 version of the English liturgy. This liturgy was limited in ways of worship and expression. The liturgy was then revised in 2000. The changes were intended to match the Ghanaian character on display during services, and the new liturgy cover topics such as what the choir would wear and the general setup of buildings. This new and more charismatic liturgy was intended to allow the worshipers to add a more vibrant and jubilant interpretation of praise, intended to make a more spiritual presence for services.

== Charismatic Movement ==
In the late 1960s, Charismatic Christianity spread into Ghana. This new form of Christianity was a faster-paced, more vibrant, and more kinetic form of Christianity. Many West Africans found this form of Christianity more appealing than the more staid church services favored by older congregations. At this time, many religious churches were competing for African locals as congregation members, and the adoption of charismatic Christianity was a major distinction between churches. This charismatic spread allowed any church that used this method of practice to gain a boost in congregation members and this left any church not following suit at a loss or stagnancy in terms of turnout. The first charismatic praise group arose in Kumasi: the Methodist Prayer Fellowship, which began in 1984. A few years after its first national assembly, the Methodist Church Ghana wanted to replicate this charismatic worship service. This decision encouraged the church to spread the charismatic movement throughout the whole congregation instead of just one focused group. With this idea came the Methodist Prayer and Renewal Program (MPRP), a group dedicated to making certain that the charismatic methods touched every area of the church. This group not only spread the charismatic movement throughout the mainline Protestant Methodist church in Ghana's cities, but also to smaller churches in villages. Due to the influence of the movement, some non-ordained charismatic leaders were formally appointed as evangelists due to their commitment to their work.

As part of the charismatic movement, clergy and congregants have incorporated more in-church prayer. Churches regularly hold short fasting and prayer events every Friday, with certain monthly prayer meetings beginning early and proceeding through the night. These events have resulted in a boost in attendance, which has contributed to member participation. The numbers show over five-hundred people a day in attendance at some congregations. This new movement has added a homelike and curative aspect through these consistent meetings. Congregation members note that these events bring the gift of healing and there are reports from the National Crusade organized by the Methodist Church Ghana.

Most charismatic meetings were promoted through media advertisements, breaking news reports, the creation of artistic banners, guest shout outs and advertisements on radio stations, the handing out of flyers and pamphlets, and most effectively through word of mouth.

== Role in health and education ==
In the 1970s in Ghana, being admitted into university was a difficult proposition due to the small number of schooling options and the extremely low admittance rate, since there were far more applicants than available slots. This led the Ghanaian government to look towards non-governmental associations to make higher education more accessible. In 1974, Dr. John Kofi Agbeti, the first Ghanaian Methodist minister to earn a Ph.D., wanted to create a higher educational establishment that would accept and support all variations of Christianity. In 1998 during their yearly conference, Methodist Church Ghana made Dr. Agbeti's suggestion for a university a reality and the decision resulted in Methodist University College Ghana, being constructed on a two-square-mile plot with classes beginning in 2000.

The Methodist Church University, Ghana illustrated its core values and ideals with a seven piece plan:

First, to avail a safe educational environment where students could utilize its programs and resources to learn a liberal and technical education to fit the needs of the country. Second, to sponsor research in order to harvest knowledge for application towards any problem. Third, to develop the student's ability to critically think and problem solve. Fourth, to be a home for all students regardless of gender, religion, or racial identity. Fifth, to give students the top professional and innovative training possible. Sixth, to promote hard work and strengthen the student's connection to their African background. Seventh, to spread Christianity and endorse the giving of the student's life to God.

Another important school that the Methodist Church Ghana constructed was Cape Coast's Mfantsipim. This school was responsible for educating John Mensah Sarbah, the head of the Aborigines Rights Protection Society, Joseph Ephraim Casely Hayford, a leader in the founding of the West African Congress, and other prominent figures in African history.

The Methodist Church Ghana has placed an importance on its medical work since its construction. With the help of the government, for multiple decades The Methodist Church Ghana has contributed health-care services. The division of Health and Sanitation is under the Methodist Church Ghana Board of Social Responsibility and Rural Development. Miriam Hornsby Odoi, a worker for the Diocese who directs The Methodist Church Ghana's health programs, states that the church's involvement in medical work comes from Jesus Christ when his disciples were local healers and spirit purifiers. Odoi also states that the importance of the medical work is to complete mental, social, and physical well-being. The church controls the Ankaase Methodist Faith Hospital. A congregational member, J. K. Manu, modeled, designed, and built the two-story medical center. A representative of the church then negotiated with the administration for the proper rights to operate and run the hospital. After expanding the property and adding medically trained professionals, on 24 September 1988 the hospital opened to the public. This church uses a combination of westernized medicine with spiritual healing. Since then the church has convinced many investors to contribute monetary donations to the hospital and the church has implemented chaplains to run the medical center. This is now a prominent health center in Ghana.

The Methodist Revival was a movement held by the Methodist Church Britain to reach citizens who felt neglected by the Church of England. Because many Ghanaian churches also serve as a local school, The Methodist Church Ghana incorporated this movement for the locals and used this opportunity to educate students about its religion and taught any citizen, young or old to read and write. This also helped educate citizens who previously couldn't afford schooling.

== Challenges ==
The Methodist Church Ghana has not always had success in its endeavors. The church has faced congregation-dividing problems. The Methodist church of Ghana originally regarded itself as an Akan-dominated church, but this idea was challenged. One issue arose due to differences in ethnic backgrounds among congregants. In the 1920s, Methodist Church Ghana had three congregations in Accra. Many of these congregation members were of the Ga ethnicity, followed in population by Fante people. Many Sunday schools used Fante-Akan as the primary language for service, so Ga people had to accommodate themselves to Fante preferences. In 1965 the Fante people made their own church building, called themselves the Cavalry Society, and placed their building in an area that would change their closest proximity circuit, Wesley Circuit, to the Adabraka Circuit. In an attempt to be impartial, The Methodist Church Ghana assigned neutral parties within its church council to decide on a sanction for the Calvary Society's infraction. In an attempt to act impartially, The Methodist Church Ghana assigned expatriate parties to give opinions on the matter. The proposal from the neutral parties suggested that the circuits be reorganized to accommodate language barriers within the circuits. This suggestion was declined and the Calvary Society petitioned to become its own separate circuit. After a long struggle with some bureaucratic policies, Calvary Society's request to become a circuit was approved and the name changed to the North-Accra circuit.

Another ethnic problem manifested by way of cultural leadership. In the 1980s there was a conflict between two ethnic groups, as a Fante native and a Ga native debated which of these two ethnic groups should control the conference's presidency. Another problem became the struggle for power between the people's democratic control and the hierarchical control of the church. Many conferences were called to sort out the power struggle and arguments about certain interpretations of the church's constitution arose. Many times the ethnic-bias issue was exposed, and other times the underlying thought served as a basis for other arguments. These debates about the constitution's clarifications came at a price, as the debates led to the suspension and resignation of church ministers.

== Presidents and presiding bishops ==
- Francis C.F. Grant (1961–1966)
- T. Wallace Koomson (1966–1973)
- Charles K. Yamoah (1973–1977)
- Charles Awotwi Pratt (1977–1979)
- Samuel B. Essamuah (1979–1984)
- Charles Awotwi Pratt (1984–1985)
- Jacob S. A. Stephens (1985–1990)
- Kwesi A. Dickson (1990–1997)
- Samuel Asante Antwi (1997–2003)
- Robert Aboagye-Mensah (2003–2009)
- Emmanuel Kwaku Asante (2009–2014)
- Titus Awotwi Pratt (2014–2018)
- Paul Boafo (2018–2024)
- J. Kwabena Asamoah-Gyadu (2024 – present)

== See also ==
- Wesley Methodist Cathedral (Accra)
- Wesley Methodist Cathedral (Kumasi)
- Christianity in Ghana
- Religion in Ghana
