= Embassy of Ghana, Washington, D.C. =

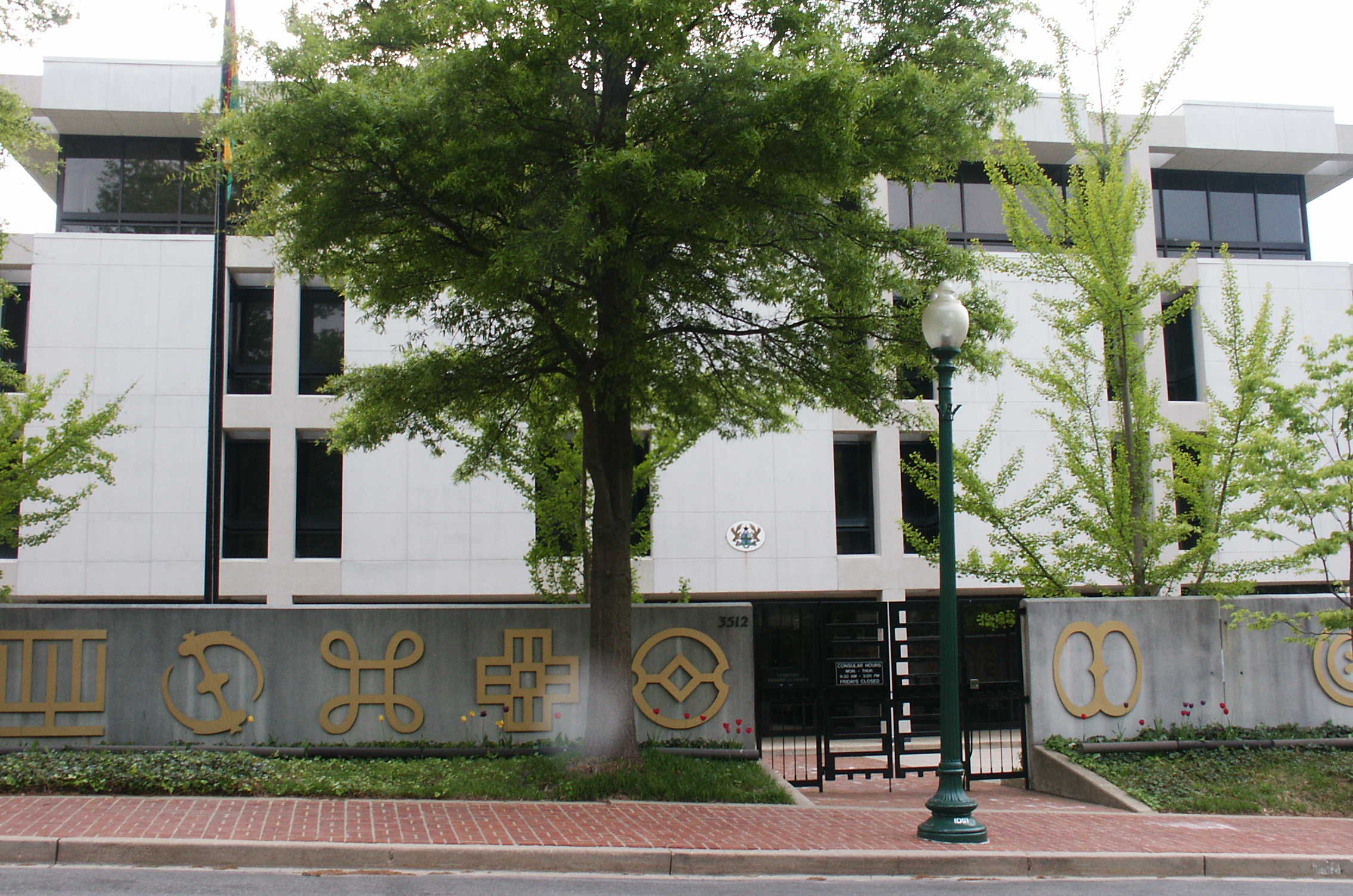
- Location: Washington, D.C.
- Address: 3512 International Drive, N.W.
- Coordinates: 38°56′32″N 77°4′5″W
- Ambassador: (Hajia) Alima Mahama
- Website: ghanaembassydc.org

The Embassy of Ghana in Washington, D.C. is the diplomatic mission of the Republic of Ghana to the United States. It is located at 3512 International Drive, Northwest, Washington, D.C., in the Cleveland Park neighborhood.

The embassy also operates a Consulate General in New York City

== List of Ambassadors ==
Appointment	Ambassador	President of Ghana	President of the United States of America
April 15, 1957	Seth Anthony	Kwame Nkrumah	Dwight D. Eisenhower
November 25, 1957	Daniel Ahmling Chapman	Kwame Nkrumah	Dwight D. Eisenhower
October 6, 1959	W.M.Q. Halm	Kwame Nkrumah	Dwight D. Eisenhower
April 19, 1963	Miguel Augustus Francisco Ribeiro	Kwame Nkrumah	Lyndon B. Johnson
August 8, 1966	Abraham Benjamin Bah Kofi	Joseph Arthur Ankrah	Lyndon B. Johnson
September 28, 1967	Ebenezer Moses Debrah	Joseph Arthur Ankrah	Lyndon B. Johnson
July 2, 1972	Johnson Kwaku Appiah	Ignatius Kutu Acheampong	Richard Nixon
July 18, 1972	Harry Reginald Amonoo	Ignatius Kutu Acheampong	Richard Nixon
May 8, 1974	Samuel Ernest Quarm	Ignatius Kutu Acheampong	Gerald Ford
January 15, 1978	Moses Kwasi Agyeman	Fred Akuffo	Jimmy Carter
February 24, 1978	Alex Quaison-Sackey	Fred Akuffo	Jimmy Carter
August 27, 1980	Joseph Kingsley Baffour-Senkyire	Hilla Limann	Jimmy Carter
January 15, 1982	Ebenezer Amatei Akuete	Jerry Rawlings	Ronald Reagan
December 9, 1982	Eric Kwamina Otoo	Jerry Rawlings	Ronald Reagan
October 18, 1990	Joseph Leo Seko Abbey	Jerry Rawlings	George H. W. Bush
August 11, 1994	Ekwow Spio-Garbrah	Jerry Rawlings	Bill Clinton
November 7, 1997	Koby Arthur Koomson	Jerry Rawlings	Bill Clinton
November 2, 2001	Alan John Kyerematen	John Agyekum Kufuor	George W. Bush
August 4, 2004	Fritz Kwabena Poku	John Agyekum Kufuor	George W. Bush
September 5, 2006	Kwame Bawuah-Edusei	John Agyekum Kufuor	George W. Bush
December 7, 2009	Daniel Ohene Agyekum	John Evans Atta Mills	Barack Obama
October 16, 2014	Joseph Henry Smith	John Dramani Mahama	Barack Obama
June, 2017	Baffour Adjei Bawuah	Nana Akufo-Addo	Donald Trump
June, 2021	(Hajia) Alima Mahama	Nana Akufo-Addo	Joe Biden

== See also ==
- Ghana–United States relations
- Embassy of the United States, Accra
