= J. L. S. Abbey =

Ghanaian diplomat

Ghana Ambassador to the United States of America
- In office 17 December 1990 – 11 August 1994
- Appointed by: John Jerry Rawlings
- Preceded by: Eric Kwamina Otoo
- Succeeded by: Ekwow Spio-Garbrah

Ghana High Commissioner to the United Kingdom
- In office 30 September 1986 – 17 December 1990
- Appointed by: John Jerry Rawlings
- Preceded by: Kenneth Dadzie
- Succeeded by: K. B. Asante

Ghana High Commissioner to Canada
- In office 6 March 1984 – 30 September 1986
- Appointed by: John Jerry Rawlings
- Preceded by: William Bedford Van Lare
- Succeeded by: Oliver Kenneth Kofi Lawluvi

Commissioner for Economic Planning
- In office May 1978 – September 1979
- Appointed by: Ignatius Kutu Acheampong
- Preceded by: Robert K. A. Gardiner
- Succeeded by: Amon Nikoi

Personal details
- Born: Joseph Leo Seko Abbey; 15 August 1940 (age 85) Gold Coast
- Parent: Robert Abbey
- Education: London School of Economics; Iowa State University; University of Western Ontario

Joseph Leo Seko Abbey (born 15 August 1940) was a Ghanaian economist, politician and diplomat. He served as Ghana's Commissioner for Economic Planning from 1978 to 1979. He was Ghana High Commissioner to Canada from 1984 to 1986, Ghana High Commissioner to the United Kingdom from 1986 to 1990, and Ghana Ambassador to the United States of America from 1990 to 1994.

== Early life and education ==
Abbey was born on 15 August 1940 in Accra, Gold Coast, the son of Robert Mensah Abbey, a Ghanaian politician and Member of Parliament during the first republic.

Abbey had his secondary education at Mfantsipim School and later entered the London School of Economics in 1961 where he obtained his bachelor's degree in economics in 1964. In 1965, he enrolled at the Iowa State University for his graduate studies in statistics. In 1967 he was awarded a master's degree in statistics, and in 1968 he was awarded his doctorate degree in statistics. In 1971, he joined the University of Western Ontario as an Associate Research Fellow. In 1973, he obtained a master's degree in economics from the university.

== Career ==
After obtaining his bachelor's degree from the London School of Economics, he joined the Central Bureau of Statistics as an Assistant Statistical Officer. Following his studies at the Iowa State University, Abbey joined the University of Ghana as a lecturer in economics. From 1973 to 1974, he worked at the United Nations Conference on Trade and Development (UNCTAD) in New York as a research fellow. Upon his return to Ghana in 1974, he appointed by the then Supreme Military Council (SMC) government to serve in the Economic Planning Commission while doubling as a government statistician and economist. Following the retirement of Robert K. A. Gardiner in May 1978, Abbey was appointed Commissioner for Economic Planning (now Minister for Finance and Economic Planning). He held this post until September 1979.

In the Limann government that lasted from 1979 to 1982, Abbey had no direct involvement in government administration, however, he was a member of the economic team that was responsible for the 1981–1982 budget that was rejected by parliament. According to parliament, the budget was "unrealistic and did not address the problems of the country". He later became the chairman of the Premier Bank and an economic consultant for the United Nations Development Programme (UNDP) and the United Nations Economic Commission for Africa (ECA).

Following the 31 December 1981 coup d'état by Jerry John Rawlings, Abbey was appointed member of the National Economic Review Committee, he served in this capacity from 1982 to 1983. In June 1983, he became the Executive Secretary of the Policy Monitoring and Implementation Committee, and also acting Secretary for Trade in the Provisional National Defence Council (PNDC) government.

During the 1983 drought period, he played a major role in launching Ghana's Economic Recovery Programme, 1983–1986, a programme that advocated the use of orthodox financial and fiscal means to tackle the crippling economy. According to him "Ghana had been declared a "worst case situation" by the World Bank. But the Bank and the IMF were prepared to help in return for serious economic restructuring".

He later requested for a diplomatic appointment and on 6 March 1984, he was appointed Ghana's High Commissioner to Canada. He held this post until 30 September 1986 when he was made Ghana's High Commissioner to the United Kingdom. On 17 December 1990 he was appointed Ghana's Ambassador to the United States of America. He served in this capacity until 11 August 1994.

== See also ==
- Embassy of Ghana in Washington, D.C.
