= Ebenezer Akuete =

Ghanaian diplomat (born 1935)

Ebenezer Amatei Akuete

Chargé d'affaires to the Embassy of Ghana in the United States of America
- In office 15 January 1982 – 9 December 1982
- President: Jerry John Rawlings
- Preceded by: Joseph Kingsley Baffour-Senkyire
- Succeeded by: Eric Kwamina Otoo

Personal details
- Born: Ebenezer Amatei Akuete; 8 December 1935 (age 90) Gold Coast
- Education: Accra Academy; University of Ghana (BA); Ghana Institute of Management and Public Administration (PGDip); Johns Hopkins University (MA)
- Occupation: Diplomat; Economist; Consultant

Ebenezer Amatei Akuete (born 8 December 1935) is a Ghanaian diplomat and economic consultant. He served as chargé d'affaires of the Ghana Embassy in the United States of America from January 1982 to December 1982.

== Early life and education ==
Akuete was born on 8 December 1935. He had his early education at Osu Presbyterian Boarding School, Salem where he completed in 1951. In 1952, he won a Director of Education scholarship to study at the Accra Academy and he graduated in 1955. From 1958 to 1961, he studied at the University of Ghana on a Ghana Government Scholarship. There, he graduated with a bachelor's degree in economics. He later enrolled at the Ghana Institute of Management and Public Administration to pursue a post-graduate diploma in public administration which he obtained in 1962. In 1968, Akuete was a Fulbright scholar at Paul H. Nitze School of Advanced International Studies, Johns Hopkins University where he was awarded his Master of Arts degree in international relations in 1970.

== Career ==
Akuete entered the Ghana Foreign Service in September 1961. He served as chargé d'affaires of the Ghanaian permanent mission to the United Nations based in Havana, Cuba. He was responsible for Ghana's diplomatic relations with Cuba. He was later made counsellor and head of chancery of the Ghana Embassy to Brazil in Rio de Janeiro. He served as minister-counsellor of the Ghanaian Embassy in France with concurrent accreditation to UNESCO and Spain from 1972 to 1974, and from 1974 to 1976, he was Minister-Counsellor of the Ghana Embassy in West Germany, Bonn.

In 1976, he was appointed superintendent director of the Africa Bureau of the Ministry of Foreign Affairs. He served in that capacity until 2 September 1978 when he was appointed deputy chief of missions for the Embassy of Ghana in Washington, D.C. He succeeded Moses Kwasi Agyeman who was then minister-counsellor of the embassy. He became Ghana's ambassador to the United States of America on 15 January 1982, and served in this capacity until 9 December 1982 serving in this capacity as chargé d'affaires. He was succeeded by Eric Kwamina Otoo. Akuete became a principal secretary at the Ministry of Foreign Affairs in September 1983.

From 1970 to 1972, he worked as a part-time lecturer at the Ghana Institute of Management and Public Administration. In 1983, he set-up and managed Bethel Consultants Ltd., an economic consulting firm in Washington, D.C. that offered services in management support and economic development. In 1990, he joined AMEX International, Inc., a consulting firm based in Washington, D.C. He was responsible for the firm's public policy and macro-economic analysis. He also oversaw all of the firm's projects outside the United States of America as director and manager. He worked with the firm from 1990 to 2004.

== Personal life ==
Akuete is married with three children. He speaks the Spanish and English languages fluently, and has a working knowledge of the Portuguese and French languages. As a Ga, he played an active role in the Ga-Dangme Association of Washington, D.C. from 1983 until his return to Ghana in 1997. He was the association's president for five years. Upon his return to Ghana in December 1997, he played an active role in the affairs of the Ghana Dangme council, and was appointed vice-president and later president of the council, succeeding K. B. Asante. Akuete is a Christian and a member of the Presbyterian Church of Ghana. He volunteers for the church locally (Osu) and at national levels.

== See also ==
- Embassy of Ghana in Washington, D.C.
