= High Commission of Ghana, London =

Diplomatic mission of Ghana to the United Kingdom

High Commission of Ghana in London
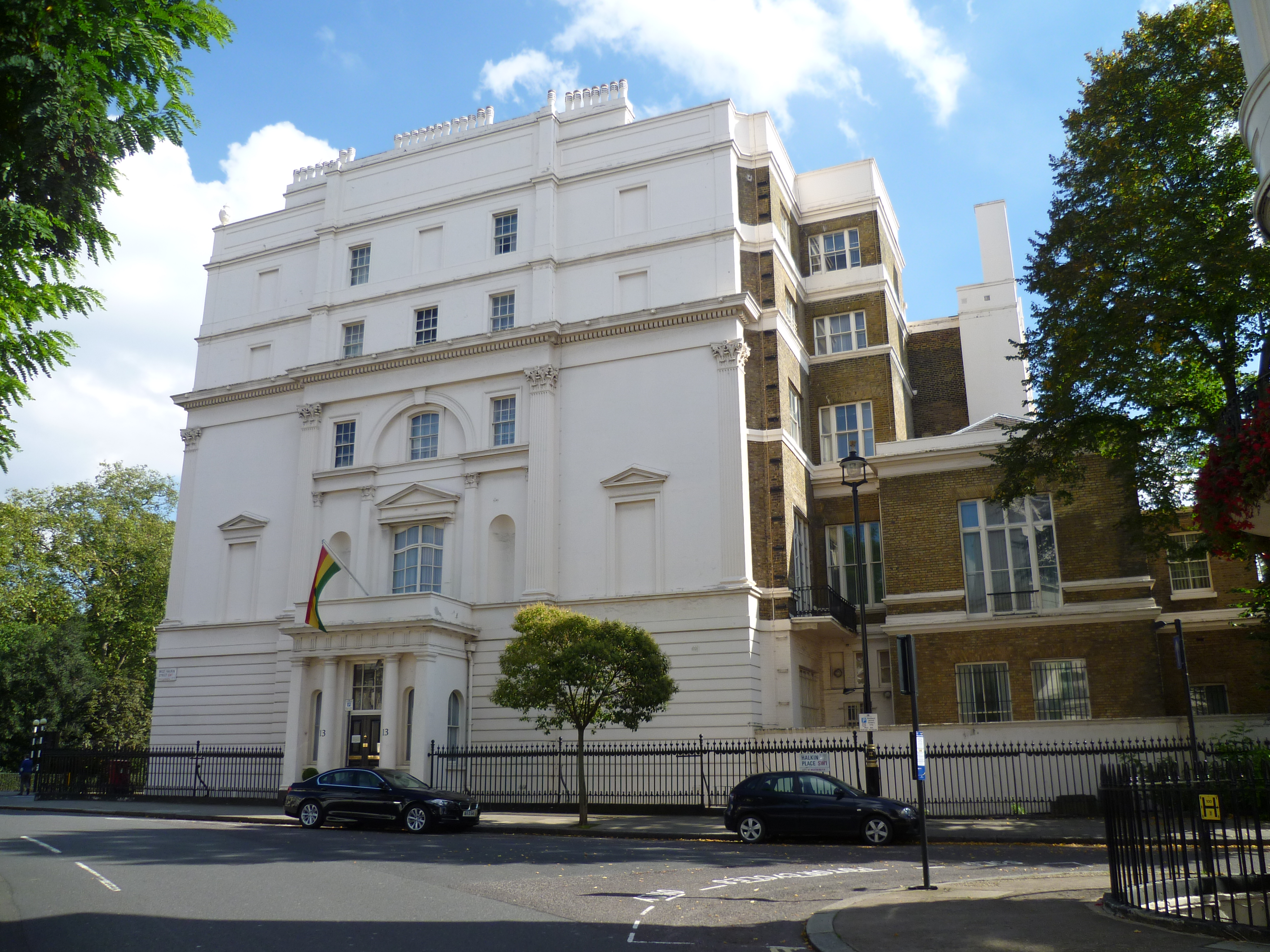
- Location: Belgravia, London
- Address: 13 Belgrave Square, London, SW1X 8PN
- Coordinates: 51°29′55.7″N 0°9′18.9″W
- High Commissioner: Papa Owusu-Ankomah
- Website: ghanahighcommissionuk.com

The High Commission of Ghana in London is the diplomatic mission of Ghana in the United Kingdom.

The High Commission operates two separate offices: at 13 Belgrave Square, London, SW1X 8PN, and at Cromwell House, 104 Highgate Hill, London N6 5HE, as well as an Honorary Consulate in 17 Bellevue Road, Ayr KA7 2SA Glasgow, Scotland, and a Consulate at 1 Marine Terrace, Dun Laoghaire, Dublin A96 KD86, Ireland.

The Passports, Immigration, Recruitment, Education, Trade & Investment, Police Liaison and International Maritime Organization Sections are all located in the building at 104 Highgate Hill, Highgate.

The exterior of the building was filmed as the residence of the character Anna Kalman, played by Ingrid Bergman in the 1958 film, Indiscreet.

== List of high commissioners ==
Appointment	Term ended	High Commissioner	President of Ghana
1957	1962	Edward Asafu-Adjaye	Kwame Nkrumah
1962	1965	Kwesi Armah	Kwame Nkrumah
1965	1966	J. E. Bossman	Kwame Nkrumah
1966	1969	Major Seth Anthony	Joseph Arthur Ankrah
1970	1972	A. B. Attafua	Edward Akufo-Addo
1972	1974	H. V. H. Sekyi	Ignatius Kutu Acheampong
1975	1978	Samuel McGall Asante	Ignatius Kutu Acheampong
1978	1980	E. M. Debrah	Fred Akuffo
1980	1982	Francis Badgie	Hilla Limann
1982	1985	K. K. S. Dadzie	Jerry Rawlings
1986	1990	J. L. S. Abbey	Jerry Rawlings
1991	1993	K. B. Asante	Jerry Rawlings
1994	1995	K. K. S. Dadzie	Jerry Rawlings
1996	1997	Patrick R. D. Hayford (Note: Acting High Commissioner)	Jerry Rawlings
1997	2001	James Aggrey-Orleans	Jerry Rawlings
2001	2001	Chris Kpodo (Note: Acting High Commissioner)	Jerry Rawlings
2001	2006	Isaac Osei	John Kufour
2006	2009	Annan Cato	John Kufuor
2009	2014	Kwaku Danso-Boafo	John Atta Mills
2014	2017	Victor Emmanuel Smith	John Mahama
2017		Papa Owusu-Ankomah	Nana Akufo-Addo

== Gallery ==
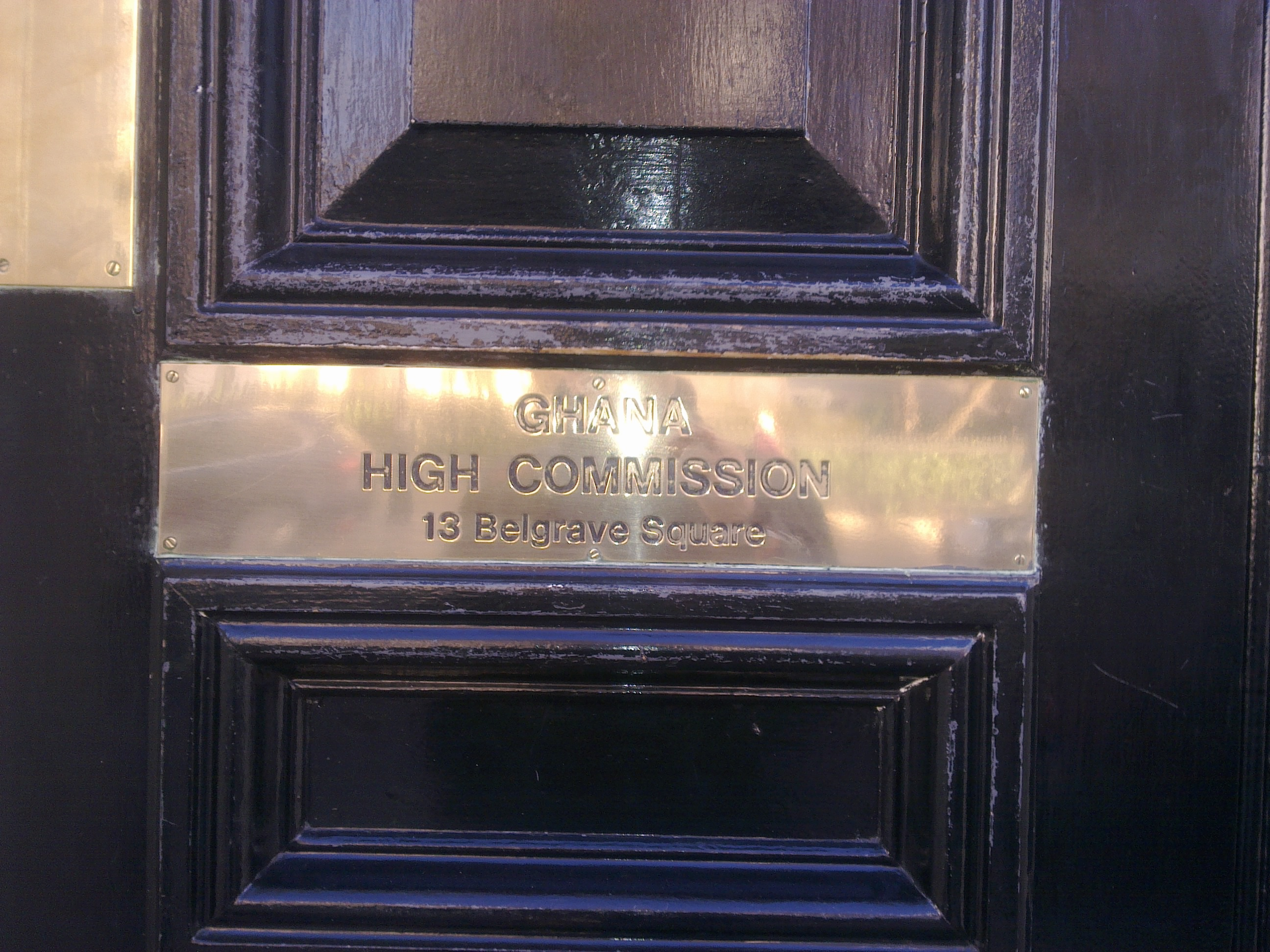
Plaque outside the High Commission

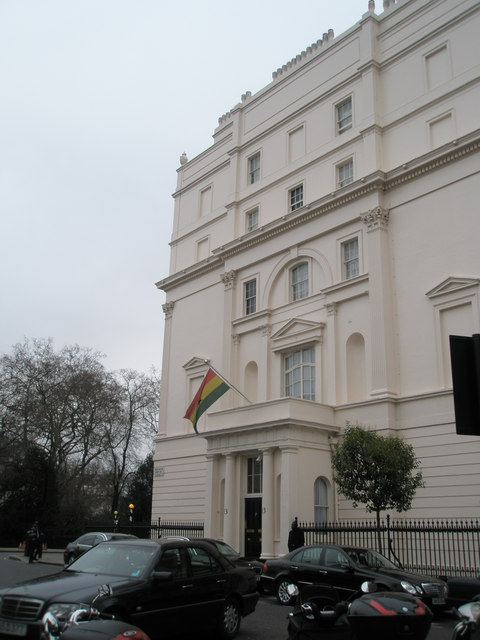
The High Commission seen from Halkin Place
