= Moses Kwasi Agyeman =

Ghanaian diplomat (1935–2022)

Ghana Ambassador to the United States of America
- In office 15 January 1978 – 24 February 1978
- Appointed by: Ignatius Kutu Acheampong
- Preceded by: Samuel Ernest Quarm
- Succeeded by: Alex Quaison-Sackey

Personal details
- Born: 1935 Gold Coast
- Died: 4 April 2022 (aged 86)
- Occupation: Diplomat

Moses Kwasi Agyeman (1935 – 4 April 2022) was a Ghanaian diplomat. He served as Ghana's Ambassador to the United States of America from 15 January 1978 to 24 February 1978. Prior to his appointment, he was Minister Counsellor of the Embassy of Ghana in Washington, D.C. He also served as Counsellor of the High Commission of Ghana in Pakistan, Counsellor and head of chancery of the Ghana High Commission to Kenya, and First Secretary of the Ghana High Commission in London.

Agyeman was married to the late Roberta Akwele Agyeman (née Davies). Their children included Theresa, Kwame, Effie, and Kwabena "KB" Boakye. He died on 4 April 2022, at the age of 86.

== See also ==
- Embassy of Ghana in Washington, D.C.
