= Joseph Kingsley Baffour-Senkyire =

Ghanaian academic, politician and diplomat

Ghana Ambassador to the United States of America
- In office 1979 – December 1981
- Appointed by: Hilla Limann
- Preceded by: Alex Quaison-Sackey
- Succeeded by: Ebenezer Amatei Akuete

Member of the Ghana Parliament for Duayaw Nkwanta
- In office 1965 – 24 February 1966
- Preceded by: New
- Succeeded by: Constituency abolished

Personal details
- Born: 19 March 1928 Gold Coast
- Died: 8 February 1999 (aged 70)
- Party: Convention People's Party
- Education: St. Augustine's College; Purdue University
- Occupation: politician; diplomat
- Profession: Academic

Joseph Kingsley Baffour-Senkyire was a Ghanaian academic, politician and diplomat. He was the member of parliament for the Duayaw-Nkwanta constituency from 1965 to 1966. and Ghana's Ambassador to United States of America from 1979 to 1981.

== Early life and education ==
Baffuor-Senkyire was born on 19 March 1928. He was the second child of Nana Afua Birago, the late queen mother of the Duayaw Nkwanta Traditional area and Opanin Kwame Adiyea who hailed from Adugyama. He had his early education at the Bechem Catholic Boys School and his secondary education from St. Augustine's College, Cape Coast from 1943 until 1948 when he obtained his Cambridge School Certificate. In 1958, he won a Government Scholarship to study at the American Purdue University. There, he studied Agriculture for his Bachelors' and Masters' degrees from 1956 to 1962. Baffuor-Senkyire later returned to Purdue University to pursue a doctorate degree in Agriculture and was awarded the degree in 1971. In 1979, he was awarded an honorary doctor of letters degree by Purdue University.

== Career ==
=== Academia and civil service ===
After his secondary education Baffuor-Senkyire taught at the Government School at Asem in Kumasi prior to joining the civil service. From 1954 to 1956, he worked at the Information Service Department (now the Ghana Broadcasting Corporation).

After his studies in the United States of America, he returned to Ghana in 1962 and joined the teaching staff of the University of Science and Technology (now the Kwame Nkrumah University of Science and Technology). There, he worked as a lecturer in Animal Husbandry and in 1977, he was elevated to the rank of a Senior Lecturer.

Following the overthrow of the Limann government on 31 December 1981, Baffuor-Senkyire returned to his alma mater, Purdue University as a visiting professor in the Department of Agricultural Economics on a two-year contract. He returned to Ghana in 1986 and rejoined the Faculty of Agriculture of the University of Science and Technology. He retired in 1988.

=== Politics and foreign service ===
Baffuor-Senkyire was elected into parliament to represent the Duayaw Nkwanta constituency on the ticket of the Convention People's Party (CPP) in 1965. He served in this position until the overthrow of the Nkrumah government on 24 February 1966.

At the inception of the Third Republic in 1979, Baffuor-Senkyire was appointed Ghana's Ambassador to United States of America. He held this appointment until the overthrow of the Limann government on 31 December 1981.

== Personal life and death ==
After his retirement, Baffuor-Senkyire started a funeral undertaker's business. He was taken ill on 5 February 1999 and admitted at the Bomso Clinic in Kumasi. He died on 8 February 1999. He was survived by his wife, Charlotte Baffuor-Senkyire, and five children.

== See also ==
- List of MPs elected in the 1965 Ghanaian parliamentary election
