= Abraham Benjamin Bah Kofi =

Ghanaian diplomat

Ghana Ambassador to the United States of America
- In office 8 August 1966 – 28 September 1967
- Appointed by: Joseph Arthur Ankrah
- Preceded by: Miguel Augustus Francisco Ribeiro
- Succeeded by: Ebenezer Moses Debrah

Ghana Ambassador to Pakistan
- In office 1962–1966
- Appointed by: Dr. Kwame Nkrumah
- Preceded by: New
- Succeeded by: E. R. T. Madjitey

Personal details
- Born: 1917 Gold Coast
- Education: University of Southampton; London School of Economics
- Occupation: diplomat

Aabraham Benjamin Bah Kofi (1917–unknown) was a Ghanaian diplomat and businessman who served as Ghana's Ambassador to the United States of America from 1966 to 1967.

== Early life and education ==
Bah Kofi was born in 1917 in Ghana (then Gold Coast). He received his early education in Ghana prior to entering the University College, Southampton, England for his undergraduate studies. He obtained his postgraduate degree in International Law and Institutions at the London School of Economics, a member institution of the federal University of London.

== Career ==
After his studies abroad, Bah Kofi entered the Colonial Civil Service, he worked for the Postal Service and subsequently joined the Ghana Foreign Service in 1956. in 1957, he was appointed Ghana's first chargé d' affaires in Monrovia, Liberia. He served in this capacity from 1957 to 1958. in 1959, he became the deputy Ghana High Commissioner in London. In 1960, he returned to Ghana to serve as principal assistant secretary to the Ministry of Foreign Affairs, and a year later, he was promoted to the post of principal secretary. in 1962, he became the first Ghanaian High Commissioner to Pakistan. On 8 August 1966 he became Ghana's ambassador to the United States of America. He held this appointment until 28 September 1967. He represented Ghana at several conferences and was also a member of various delegations while serving in the Foreign Service.
