= Ebenezer Moses Debrah =

Ghanaian diplomat (1928–2023)

Ghana High Commissioner to the United Kingdom
- In office 1978–1980
- Appointed by: Fred Akuffo
- Preceded by: Samuel McGal Asante
- Succeeded by: Francis Kelugu Badgie

Ghana High Commissioner to Australia
- In office 1977–1978
- Appointed by: Ignatius Kutu Acheampong
- Preceded by: Franz Abadio Yao Djaisi
- Succeeded by: Chemogoh Kevin Dzang

Secretary to the National Redemption Council & Head of the Civil Service
- In office 1973–1976
- Appointed by: Ignatius Kutu Acheampong
- Preceded by: Nathan Quao
- Succeeded by: Frank Beecham

Ghana Ambassador to the United States of America
- In office 28 September 1967 – 2 July 1972
- Appointed by: Joseph Arthur Ankrah
- Preceded by: Abraham Benjamin Bah Kofi
- Succeeded by: Johnson Kwaku Appiah

Ghana Ambassador to Ethiopia
- In office 1963–1967
- Appointed by: Kwame Nkrumah
- Preceded by: Miguel Augustus Francisco Ribeiro
- Succeeded by: Harry Reginald Amonoo

Personal details
- Born: 9 July 1928 Koforidua, Eastern Region, Gold Coast
- Died: 23 May 2023 (aged 94)
- Education: Mfantsipim School; Achimota School
- Alma mater: University of Ghana; London School of Economics
- Occupation: diplomat

Ebenezer Moses Debrah (9 July 1928 – 23 May 2023) was a Ghanaian diplomat. He served as Ghana's ambassador to Ethiopia, the United States of America, and Ghana's High Commissioner to the United Kingdom and Australia from 1963 to 1980. He was also cabinet secretary and head of the civil service from 1973 to 1976.

== Early life and education ==
Debrah was born on 9 July 1928 at Koforidua in the Eastern Region of Ghana (then Gold Coast). He had his secondary education at Mfantsipim School and Achimota School where he obtained his Cambridge School Leaving Certificate in 1950. After a short spell of teaching at Abuakwa State College, he enrolled at the University College of the Gold Coast (now the University of Ghana) in 1951, where he was awarded his Bachelor of Arts degree in history in 1954. In 1955 he studied at the London School of Economics and Political Science.

== Career ==
Following his studies at the University College of the Gold Coast, Debrah joined the Gold Coast Civil Service as an Assistant Publications Officer in the Information Services Department. He was a member of the first selected officers that formed the nucleus of the foreign cadet who were trained abroad to steer Ghana's Foreign Missions when Ghana attained independence. After his studies at the London School of Economics, he served as an Assistant to the Secretary of the Ministry of Defence and External Affairs. Following Ghana's independence, Debrah was posted to the Ghana Embassy in Monrovia, Liberia as its first Secretary. In 1959, he served in that same capacity in the Embassy of Ghana in Cairo, Egypt (then the United Arab Republic). A year later, he worked as a Counselor at the Embassy of Ghana in Washington, D.C., U.S.A. In 1962, he returned to Ghana to serve as the Director in Charge of Asia and Middle East Affairs at the Ministry of Foreign Affairs.

In 1965, Debrah was appointed Ambassador Extraordinary and Plenipotentiary of Ghana to Ethiopia. He served in that same capacity until 1967 when he was appointed Ghana's ambassador to the United States of America. in 1972, he returned to Ghana to serve as Supervising Principal Secretary in the Ministry of Foreign Affairs. In December 1973, he was made Secretary to the National Redemption Council and to the Supreme Military Council when it was established in October 1975. In 1977 Debrah was appointed Ghana's High Commissioner to Australia and a year later, Ghana's High Commissioner to the United Kingdom. He held this appointment until 1980.

In 1990, the Namibian Foreign Affairs Ministry was established with significant contributions from Debrah, following the country's independence. He provided Diplomacy training to the first, second and third groups of Namibian Heads of Mission and foreign officials.

== Death and tributes ==
Debrah died on 22 May 2023, at the age of 94. He was buried on 28 June at the Methodist Cathedral, Asafoatse Road. On 5 October, a state funeral was held in his honour. Amongst the dignitaries present at the funeral service were Ghana's president Nana Akufo-Addo, a Namibian delegation constituting Hon. Motunda; Selma Ashipala-Musavyi Namibia's ambassador to Ghana), and retired Ambassador Nicky Nashandi, who was one of the trainees of Debrah while he helped set up the Namibian Foreign Affairs Ministry following Namibia's independence.

== Publications ==
In his lifetime, Debrah has authored various articles that have been published in journals and published books. Some of which include;

- Will Most Uncommitted National Remain Uncommitted? published in the American Academy of Political and Science Journal (July 1961)
- Understanding Ghana published in the Social Science, National Academy of Economics and Political Science Journal (1966)
- The Psychology of African Nationalism published in New Voices of Africa, Georgetown University, U.S.A.

== Honours ==
- Debrah was awarded an honorary doctorate degree in law (LLD) by various American Universities, in recognition of his contribution towards the strengthening of Ghana-America relations.
- In 2019, he was honoured by the government of Ghana for his "contributions towards advancing and promoting the image of the country".
