= Patrick R. D. Hayford =

Ghanaian diplomat (born 1950)

Ghana's Ambassador to the Kingdom of United Kingdom (Acting)
- In office 1996–1997
- President: Jerry Rawlings
- Preceded by: K. B. Asante
- Succeeded by: James Aggrey-Orleans

Ghana's Ambassador to South Africa
- In office 1997–1999
- President: Jerry Rawlings
- Preceded by: Thomas Aboagye Mensah
- Succeeded by: Ellen Serwaa Nee-Whang

Personal details
- Born: Patrick Reginald Dennis Hayford; 7 August 1950 (age 76) Ghana
- Education: University of Ghana; University of Nairobi
- Occupation: Diplomat

Patrick Reginald Dennis Hayford (born 7 August 1950) is a Ghanaian retired diplomat, international affairs director and administrator. Hayford served for 40 years as a diplomat in the Ghana Foreign Service including serving as Ghana's Ambassador to South Africa. He also served as the Director of African Affairs in the Executive Office of United Nations (UN) Secretary-General Kofi Annan.

== Early life and education ==
Hayford attended primary school in Cape Coast, Accra and London from 1955 to 1962. He proceeded to the Mfantsipim School for his secondary school education from 1964 to 1970. Hayford had his tertiary education at the University of Ghana, Legon receiving a bachelor's degree in English in 1972 and at the University of Nairobi completing with a postgraduate diploma in international relations in 1980.

== Career ==
Hayford was a teacher at Achimota School from 1973 to 1974 where he taught English Language, Literature and General paper. He was also the house master in charge of the Western Compound of the school.

Hayford joined the Ministry of Foreign Affairs in September 1974. Hayford served in different capacities in his thirty-three years diplomatic career in Ghana's Foreign Service, which included tours of duty in New York, Egypt, the United Kingdom and South Africa Whilst serving at the Ministry of Foreign Affairs in Ghana, he served in a high rank position as Director of International Organizations and Conferences from 1986 to 1988 and again from 1992 to 1995. He was also at one point in time the Deputy Chief of Mission in Cairo.

=== Ambassador ===
He actively participated in commonwealth missions and activities whilst in the foreign service, serving for almost two years as Ghana's Acting High Commissioner to United Kingdom from 1996 to 1997. From 1997 to 1999, Hayford was Ghana's Ambassador to South Africa. He was also a member of the Commonwealth Observer Mission for South Africa's second multiparty General Elections in 1999.

=== United Nations ===
“I’ll put him right at the top with the Mandelas and the Nkrumahs without hesitation, Ghana has lost an icon whose work greatly boosted the image of the country

— Amb. Hayford describing UN Secreatary General Kofi Annan's impact on the world and Ghana.

Hayford later joined the United Nations (UN) and was appointed in 1999 to serve as the Director for African Affairs in the Executive Office of UN Secretary-General Kofi Annan, where he served for 6 years, from 1999 to 2005.

In August 2018, Hayford being one of the most notable Ghanaians to have worked with Kofi Annan for virtually the whole time he was the UN Secretary-General, described his former boss, on Ghanaian mainstream television station Citi TV show, the Point of View as being among the greats and top African people to have made an overall impact on the continent and the world at large.

From January 2006, Hayford served as the as Director of the United Nations Office of the Special Adviser on Africa (OSAA) at UN Headquarters till he retired in 2018. His role as the director was to ensure the mission of OSAA in enhancing international support for Africa's development and security is well met. He was also to led the office in assisting the UN Secretary-General in improving coherence and coordination of the UN system support to Africa to facilitate inter-governmental deliberations on Africa at the global level.

== Public lectures ==
Hayford since his retirement has been giving public lectures on International Affairs and Diplomacy especially in Ghana and within Africa. He was appointed as a faculty member of the African University College of Communications. In February 2020 he was one speaker for a public lecture at the Legon Centre for International Affairs and Diplomacy at the University of Ghana. He spoke on the topic "Strategies for Advancing the Interests of African Countries within the United Nations System." He was also one of the keynote speakers at the Celebratory Symposium held in honour of Kofi Atta Annan, by the Kofi Annan International Peacekeeping Training Centre (KAIPTC) and the Ministry of Foreign Affairs. During the symposium he made profound statements that the best way to eulogise and remember Kofi Annan was;

“striving for the things he believed in such as feeding the poor, educating children, empowering women, among others”

== Boards ==
Hayford is currently an advisory board member of the Teach2Teach International, a non-governmental organization and an educational charity supported by the UK aid from the British people, that seeks to response to two major global challenges; low educational attainment of primary school children, and high levels of youth unemployment. He was also a member of the Komla Dumor Memorial Foundation, a foundation set up to sustain the legacy of the late Ghanaian BBC journalist Komla Dumor, by pursuing plans he had for promoting the ideals that he stood and worked for.

== See also ==
- Under-Secretary-General of the United Nations
- Foreign relations of Ghana
