= Daniel Ahmling Chapman Nyaho =

Ghanaian academic and diplomat (1909–2001)

Ghana Ambassador to the United States of America
- In office 1957–1959
- Appointed by: Kwame Nkrumah
- Preceded by: Seth Anthony
- Succeeded by: W.M.Q. Halm

Personal details
- Born: 5 July 1909 Keta, Volta Region, Gold Coast
- Died: 13 July 2001 (aged 92)
- Education: Achimota School
- Alma mater: St. Peter's Hall, Oxford
- Occupation: diplomat
- Profession: Academic

Daniel Ahmling Chapman Nyaho (5 July 1909 – 13 July 2001) was a Ghanaian statesman, diplomat and academic. He was the first African appointee at the United Nations. He served as the Secretary to the cabinet in the first Convention People's Party government which shared the colony's administration with the colonial government. He also served as Ghana's ambassador to the United States of America and Ghana's permanent representative to the United Nations. In 1958, he became the first Ghanaian headmaster of Achimota College.

Born in Keta, a town in the Volta Region of Ghana, Chapman had his early education in his hometown, Keta and briefly in Togo. He entered Achimota School to train as a teacher through unusual circumstances and taught at his alma mater, Achimota College prior to entering Oxford University for his bachelor's degree. He returned as a senior tutor at Achimota College taking up other roles in the school.

Aside academia, Chapman developed strong interest in the sociopolitical situation of the people of his hometown and the Ewe ethnic group at large. He advocated for the unification of the Ewe people who had been dispersed into different colonial administrations by the colonial powers of the time. He was a founding member of the All-Ewe Conference (AEC) and also served as its first secretary. Through his engagements as a member of the conference, he gained appointment at the United Nations, becoming one of the earliest Africans to serve on the world's most powerful intergovernmental organization.

In 1954, Chapman returned to the Gold Coast to work as Secretary to the then Prime Minister of the Gold Coast, Dr. Kwame Nkrumah. He served in that capacity until 1957 when he was made Ghana's ambassador to the United States of America. While serving in that post, he also doubled as Ghana's permanent representative to the United Nations. Following the exit of the last expatriate Headmaster of Achimota College in 1958, Chapman returned to the school as its first Ghanaian and African Headmaster. He held this appointment until 1963. Chapman returned to the United Nations once more, and also served on various boards in Ghana following the 1966 coup d'état.

Chapman spent most of his retirement years as a consultant and a small scale farmer. He was also engaged in the activities of the Ghana Academy of Arts and Sciences of which he was a member. Chapman died in 2001 at the age of 92.

== Early life ==
=== Family background ===
Chapman was born on 5 July 1909 at Keta, a town in the Volta Region of Ghana, to Jane Atsiamesi Chapman (née Atriki) and William Chapman, a merchant and the brother of Chief James Ocloo I of Keta who served as an adviser to the paramount chief of the Anlo state, Togbi Amedor Kpeglo (1879–1906) of the Bate clan. His father, Mr. William Chapman (also known by the name of Klutse) was the son of Nyaho and grandson of Sokpui, chief of Dzelukope. His father (Klutse) was one of the first natives of the Anlo state to attend Cape Coast Castle School and it was there that he became known by the name William Henry Chapman. The name Chapman subsequently became the surname used by all the children of William Henry Chapman, including Daniel Ahmling Chapman. However, after a series of events, one in which he was asked by an American whether he did not have an African name; the other when his son was unable to gain admission into Oxford University the year he applied because authorities of the university mistakened him for an Englishman, and all places available for Englishmen had been taken leaving only vacancies for foreigners and consequently told he would be considered for admission in the next year. Daniel Ahmling Chapman resolved in 1964 to add his grandfather's name Nyaho to his name, and he became Daniel Ahmling Chapman Nyaho. He lost his father at the age of seven.

=== Early education ===
His formal education begun at the Bremen Mission School at Keta. In 1919 he spent the school year at Lome he however returned to resume schooling at Keta. At the age of nine, he learnt to play the harmonium through the aid of a primer written in Ewe by the Bremen Missionaries. At the age of 10, he was able to join the nearby AME Zion church congregation in evening services to play the harmonium. It was around this period that one of his brothers arranged for him to have violin lessons. While at senior school, he helped his headmaster teach hymns, anthems and other songs to his school mates for the purposes of important occasions such as Good Friday, Easter, Christmas, Empire Day or school concerts.

By standard four (primary 4 or grade 4), he had begun nurturing dreams of becoming a teacher and later a catechist and a religious minister. At the period of his days in primary school, there were no secondary schools or training colleges in the Volta Region, secondary school education in Cape Coast were also beyond the financial means of many parents in the village. His original plan was to enter the Presbyterian Training College at Akropong to train as a teacher however, his focus changed to Achimota College due to the astir generated by Dr. Kwegyir Aggrey in the 1920s. His admiration for Dr. Kwegyir Aggrey was one of the reasons why he aspired to become a teacher by profession and his dream of entering Achimota College was a result of him (Dr. Aggrey) becoming vice principal of the school. Another reason for his choice was the opportunity of enrolling in the school on a scholarship, thus not paying school fees and also receiving stipends while in school. Chapman consequently set site for Accra to stay with one Carl Dey in hopes of enrolling in a school in Accra to sit for his Standard Seven School Leaving Examination and secure a scholarship to study at Achimota College. Things however could not go as planned as his school authorities in Keta were unable to send him a transfer certificate to enable him to enrol in a school in Accra. Chapman decided to return to Keta but prior to his return he wrote a letter to the Director of Education which read:

"Dear Sir, I wish to go to Achimota College. If you send me I will work very hard".

All hopes of attending Achimota College at the period seemed lost when Arthur Bolton, the head of the Teacher Training Department of Achimota College confirmed that Chapman was not qualified to enter Achimota College under the circumstances. Chapman later received a telegram from the Education Department in Accra which read in part:

"Chapman's name added to Bolton's list. Apply for Bond Form, from the Director of Schools."

Mr. Bolton who doubled as the director of schools visited Keta to interview candidates who wanted to enter Achimota College from the AME Zion School and the Roman Catholic School and Mr. Jiagge, a former class teacher of Chapman ceased the opportunity to narrate the ordeal of his former pupil to Bolton. Bolton could not help at that moment however, in the same year, the Education Department of the Gold Coast had organised an essay competition as part of the visit of the Prince of Wales to the country and Chapman's essay won the first prize in 1925. Bolton saw Chapman's name and recalled the story of Chapman as narrated to him by Mr. Jiagge and therefore decided to waive the prerequisit Standard Seven Certificate in Chapman's case to enroll him at Achimota College on a scholarship.

=== Teacher training ===
In 1926, Chapman entered Achimota College which was then known as the Government Teachers' Training College prior to 1927. There, he was a year behind his brother Charles Chapman and Philip Gbeho, the famous musician, composer and educationist. Chapman's tutors included Rev. A. G. Fraser (the first principal of the school), Dr. J. E. K. Aggrey the first Assistant Vice-Principal who taught him history), W. E. F. Ward, D. T. Adams and Douglas Benzies. In school, Chapman often won awards for his academic performance. He was a student of George Steven, the art teacher who was responsible for the illustrations in R. S. Rattray's Ashanti Folk Tales. The mouse on the cover of the book was his art work. Chapman completed his studies in 1929, with distinctions in three subjects: Woodwork, Music and Teaching, and missed a distinction in arts by a mark. Aside his regular academic subjects, Chapman gained interest and took courses in wood-work, beaten metal work, and music. While in school, he participated in other extra-curricular activities including serving as the secretary of the College Social Service Society, teaching some of the young boys shorthand at the college's Accra Boys, serving as the first prefect of Guggisberg House and becoming the Entertainment Secretary of the college in 1929. He was able to pass both the School Certificate and Teacher Training examinations despite all the engagements.

== Teaching career and tertiary education ==
=== Government Boys' School and return to Achimota College ===
Chapman began his teaching career in January 1931 at the Government Boys' School in Accra. While in his third year at Achimota College, Douglas Benzies, his housemaster, encouraged him to consider studying the secondary school subjects leading to the Cambridge School Certificate concurrently with his teacher training course. He therefore spent the nights studying for the London Matriculation Examination while he taught woodwork during the day. After six months of teaching in the school, he was transferred back to Achimota College at the request of the school to become a junior member of the staff working as an assistant music master with Mr W. E. F. Ward, who was the music master. Chapman also taught Woodwork, Art, and Ewe (language, custom and institutions). At Achimota College, he sought permission to study with the regular intermediate degree students, and with the assistance of former housemaster and class teachers he prepared for the London University Intermediate B.A. degree. He obtained his University of London Intermediate B.A. in English, Latin, Economics and Geography in 1932.

=== Studies at Oxford University and return to Achimota College ===
As a junior member of the staff, he served as an assistant housemaster. Chapman taught in the school for three years and in 1934 he was awarded a scholarship to study at the University of Oxford. There, he studied at St. Peter's Hall (now St. Peter's College, a constituent college of the University of Oxford). The schorlaship scheme had been introduced by the Achimota Council in 1931 to send deserving students of the school to Oxford University and later Cambridge University to acquire further education and training similar to the type of training European administrators and senior officers received prior to their appointments in the colonies. The first recipient of the scholarship was Modjaben Dowuona. Following his results in the intermediate bachelor's degree examination and his commitment to other engagements of the school, the school's council awarded him the scholarship in 1933. Chapman was inspired to pursue Geography at undergraduate level by a Geography tutor and author called D. T. Adams. Chapman passed his preliminary courses and went on to obtain a second-class Honours degree in Geography, consequently becoming the first Gold Coast native to obtain a bachelor's degree in Geography.

Following his graduation as an undergraduate, he pursued a postgraduate programme in Pre-historic Archaeology prior to his return to Achimota School in 1937 where he took up a job as a senior Geography master. In addition to teaching Geography, Chapman was responsible for other administrative tasks, he supervised students' vacation teaching practice, served as a housemaster, a librarian, the secretary to the Principal's Advisory Committee and the staff representative on the Achimota College Council. He also took up a task of an Ewe-language examiner for the Cambridge University School Certificate Examination.

== Eweland advocacy and first UN appointment ==
=== Eweland advocacy ===
While a teacher at Achimota College, Chapman was quite concerned with the social and political issues of the people of his hometown and the Ewe people at large. In 1939 he planned on opening a secondary school he hoped would have been completed and named Keta College. He completed a building started by his brother hoping it would serve as the nucleus of the college. He bought desks and chairs, and ordered and received consignments of the books for the college. He later gave up on the plan when the Director of Education was given the power to close down schools at his own discretion.

At Achimota College, he experienced the consequences of the division of the Ewe people into different colonial and political factions. During the Second World War, his bungalow hosted many Ewe people from Togo under French Mandate who had fled into the Gold Coast for political and economic reasons. Many others had gone to settle at Anumle, a village nearby.

Chapman began writing about the problems Ewe people faced due to this division in 1944. By January 1945 he had started discussions with his elder brother, C. H. Chapman, Philip Gbeho (also a tutor at Achimota College), S. S. Newlands, an employee of the United Africa Company and others on the ways and means through which the Ewe people of French Togoland could be helped and also united. Through these discussions Chapman was inspired to start a publication on the Ewes. The maiden issue of the Ewe Newsletter appeared on the news stands in May 1945 and its readers were exhorted in the following words: "The time has come for us to make a careful study of our problems and look ahead into the future. Today Eweland is divided into a western zone under British rule, and an eastern zone under French rule. Experience and the march of events have taught us that we of the whole of Eweland. We feel the effects of the partition of our people but the colonial powers hold the key to the problem. For our part, however, it is essential that we should achieve without delay, mutual trust and cooperation within each state and among the various Ewe states". The newsletter was intended to enhance Ewe cultural consciousness and foster unity amongst its people. In addition to the newsletter, Chapman together with some friends published the Nuke Xletivi, an ewe publication. These two publications supplemented with publications such as Jonathan Savi de Gove's Le Guide du Togo helped its readers understand the trusteeship system and the problems associated with it. Through these publications, a number of Ewe businessmen and teachers from the three Ewe territories; British Togoland, French Togoland and Trans-Volta Togoland met on 31 December 1945 in Accra (what became known be the first All-Ewe Conference). The purpose of the meeting was to send a resolution on unification of Ewe people to the various metropolitan countries of Britain.

The resolution stated: "We, the undersigned, who are Ewes from various parts of the Eweland (i.e. Southeast Gold Coast, South Togoland under British Mandate and South Togo under French Mandate) have given much thought to the problems of the Ewe people with special reference to the partition of our country. We have always strongly supported our chiefs in their petitions asking for the removal of the frontiers which indiscriminately cut across Eweland. We deplore the partition of our country as this constitutes a very serious barrier to our social, economic, educational and political progress as a people and we therefore do hereby resolve: (a) That all the international frontiers cutting across be removed and all Eweland brought under a single administration; (b) that the whole of Eweland become a trust territory. (c) That Britain be invited to become the administering authority in Eweland. (d) That representatives of the Ewe people take part in the making of the trusteeship agreement. (e) That a new constitution be drawn up for the whole of Eweland taking due account of our Native Authorities and our political aspirations . We are convinced that this resolution expresses the wishes of all thoughtful Ewes in both the British and French spheres of Eweland. We wish that this resolution be published in as many newspapers as possible and also brought to the notice of: (i) The British Government, (ii) The French Government, and the United Nations."

=== All-Ewe Conference ===
In June 1946, the All-Ewe Conference (AEC) was founded and its immediate mandate was to send petitions to the British government, the French government, and the United Nations. Chapman had then been elected the first Secretary-General of the All-Ewe Conference (AEC). He sent a copy of the resolution to the Secretary of State for the Colonies and added an accompanying note of him explaining that even though the Ewe Chiefs had not signed the resolution, they had made a similar request to Colonel Oliver Stanley when he visited the Gold Coast, moreover, the 26 people who signed the resolution were representatives of the Ewe people as a whole. He further explained that it was not their (AEC) intention to disrespect the British Government in any way however, the matter was urgent. Chapman held the Secretary-General position for about a year. In 1946 he was invited by the United Nations (UN) to work as an area specialist in the Department of Trusteeship and Information from Non-Self Governing Territories. According to the letter from the UN, he had been invited because the UN wanted somebody from Africa and they were told he met the qualifications they were looking for; "somebody who had knowledge of the affairs of issues of non-self governing territories." After he had received the invitation, he asked for a study leave without pay for five years from the Achimota College Council. His request turned down as the council was unable to recommend his request to the government. As he recalled; "They gave me two options: either I stay, or I persist on going without a study leave and also losing many years' pension. In the end I opted to forego the pension and the study leave; for, to me, working at the UN will give me opportunity to advance the issues which, as AEC Secretary-General, preoccupied me."

=== First UN appointment ===
In November 1946 Chapman Nyaho went to the UN in New York with his wife, and children (then two children). Chapman's task at the United Nations was to help analyse reports on educational, social and economic conditions in non-self governing territories. He was also responsible for summarising, sifting and analysing information sent to the UN by metropolitan powers about their colonies.

While working with the UN, Chapman enrolled at the New York University and the Columbia University for evening courses in international law, European history and international organizations. He and his family were the first to move into the residential area specifically built for the UN staff in Long Island, New York. There, Chapman was made the treasurer of an association that was formed by the staff. The association founded the United Nations International School in 1947 and established playgrounds for the children. It also organised international food and dance festivals in an attempt to raise money for the school. Chapman was a management board member of the school from 1950 to 1954.

== Government and diplomatic duties ==
=== Secretary to the Cabinet ===
In 1951, the Gold Coast had made study political progress. The then government made efforts to employ more Africans in the Civil Service in anticipation of political independence. The Convention People's Party (CPP) government which began to share the colony's administration with the colonial government from 1951 began seeking qualified Gold Coast natives who were living abroad to return to the colony and contribute to the national reconstruction. Chapman was offered in succession the positions of Registrar, Vice-Principal and Acting Principal of the newly opened Kumasi College of Technology, Principal Secretary to the Ministry of Education and finally the post of the Secretary to the Cabinet between the period of 1952 and 1953.

In 1952, changes were made in the Gold Coast constitution resulting in the appointment of a Prime Minister and also the need for a secretary to the cabinet. Until the time of his appointment, the post had been combined with the job of the secretary to the Governor and this post was held by Gordon Hadow. In June 1954, Chapman returned to the Gold Coast and took up appointment as Secretary to the then Prime Minister of the Gold Coast, Dr. Kwame Nkrumah. The salary was less than half of what he was receiving at the UN yet he accepted the post. As the Secretary to the then Prime Minister, he was responsible for advising the Prime Minister on policy questions, overseeing government business for the Legislative Assembly and making sure Cabinet decisions were carried out. According to him: "When I took over as secretary to the Cabinet, the Governor stressed two things; first, that I must ensure that the Prime Minister does not disgrace himself; second that the Ministers do not quarrel among themselves. I believed I carried out religiously those two instructions, hence the great harmony in which Cabinet worked in my day."

As an advocate of Ewe unification and the participation of Ewe people in the Gold Coast and Togoland under British Trusteeship, he accompanied the (Regional) administrative Officer of the Volta Region in November 1954 to the Fourth Committee of Trusteeship Council for the discussion of the Togoland and Ewe situation as a member of the British Government delegation. He believed that Ewe unification and Ewe participation in the political advancement of the Gold Coast will aid in the colony's political independence.

=== Ambassadorial appointment ===
Following Ghana's independence in 1957, Chapman gained appointment as Ghana's ambassador to the United States and Ghana's permanent representative at the UN. He was a part of the Ghana delegation to the first Conference of Independent African States held in Accra in April 1958. As an ambassador, he was demanded to implement decisions of the Conference of Independent African States. In executing this responsibility, he led the independent Africa states mission to tour South America and the Caribbean to put present the case of Algeria. In 1959, he became the first vice-chairman of the Governing Council of the UN Special Fund.

== Headmaster of Achimota College and later life ==
=== Headmaster of Achimota ===
Following the exit of the last expatriate Headmaster of Achimota College, the then government insisted on instating a Ghanaian headmaster to steer the affairs of the school. Chapman was then appointed to assume this position in 1958. While at Achimota College, he renovated structures that had not seen repairs in years he also founded a building to help improve the condition of students as far as infrastructure was concerned. He also helped in making some courses being taught then at the school locally relevant. As headmaster of the school, he served on the Interim National Council on Higher Education and Research. He also served as the vice-chairman of the International Commission on Higher Education in Ghana between 1961 and 1962. The commission's membership was drawn broadly from Africa, Europe and the USA. Notable members of the Commission included; N. S. Torocheshnikov a scientist from the Soviet Union, E. E. Evans-Pritchard, a social anthropologist, and then professor of Anthropology at the University of Oxford, H. M. Bond, an African -American educationist; and Davidson Nicol, then principal of Fourah Bay College in Sierra Leone. The commission was known for its recommendation of the then University College of the Gold Coast (now the University of Ghana) and the Kumasi College of Technology (now the Kwame Nkrumah University of Science and Technology) being made independent universities with each having its university Council as its governing body. The commission also recommended that a third Ghanaian university be built at Cape Coast in acknowledgement of its long and distinguished educational tradition, and also recommended the establishment of an Institute of African Studies to help students understand the African civilisation, its history and its ideas. According to Chapman, he faced a number of challenges as headmaster of Achimota College. He was first concerned with what he termed an "unnecessary interference" of the government in the affairs of the school. He was also concerned about the poor feeding of students, and the government's intentions of building the School of Administration on the school's playing field."

=== Second UN appointment and later life ===
Chapman was appointed Chief of Operations by the UN Secretary-General during the period of the Congo Crisis; however, the government of Ghana refused to endorse his nomination. According to him, "Nkrumah rejected my nomination because he knew I had an abiding belief in being loyal to my employers." He was therefore appointed Director of UN Division of Narcotic Drugs by the UN Secretary-General in 1963. He was stationed in Geneva. As Director, he consulted with the national narcotics control body of various countries. He helped to organise and participated in narcotics control missions under the United Nations Technical Assistance in the field of narcotic drugs.

After the 1966 coup d'etât, Chapman returned to Ghana and was appointed a member of the Political Committee of the National Liberation Council. He was later appointed chairman of the Arts Council of Ghana and also chairman of the Kwame Nkrumah University of Science and Technology Council. He was appointed Director of the Pioneer Tobacco Company in 1967, he held this position until 1970 when he retired on the grounds of ill-health. Between 1969 and 1970, he was a Danforth visiting lecturer for the Association of American Colleges. In his retirement, he spent most of his time consulting for PTC, doing farming in a small scale and, also going for meetings of the Ghana Academy of Arts and Sciences of which he was a fellow.

== Personal life, death and tributes ==
=== Personal life ===
Chapman married Jane Efua Abam Chapman Nyaho (née Quashie), daughter of Nana Nyarko VII, Nifahene of the Peki State in 1941, together they had five daughters and two sons. His hobbies were music, walking, gardening and reading.

On his 90th birthday K. B. Asante, the former Ghanaian diplomat and one of his former students at Achimota College, eulogised him in these words as he reflected on his days at Achimota College:

"The masters and mistresses in those days entertained students to lunches and teas now and again. They did not give you extra coaching for a fee. Rather they opened your mind with broad discussion and fed you as well: Daniel Chapman would say: "Eat, you won't get this in the dining hall. It is butter, not margarine." He told us stories about Oxford and whetted our appetite for learning. He constantly encouraged you and gave the impression that he was exploring the path of knowledge with you. He was genuinely delighted when you did well. As he often put it, "if you do not do better than me then I have failed.""

=== Death, burial and tribute ===
Chapman died on Friday 13 July 2001 at the age of 92. He was scheduled to be buried on Saturday 11 August 2001 in his hometown, Keta. On Friday 10 August 2001, a state burial was held in his honour at the forecourt of the State House in Accra. He was laid to rest with Military honours at the Osu Cemetery. Present at the ceremony was the then president of Ghana, John Agyekum Kufuor, his vice, Aliu Mahama, former president, Jerry John Rawlings and his wife Nana Konadu Agyeman Rawlings. The burial ceremony was also attended by other public officials; Ministers of State, members of the Council of State and the Diplomatic Corps, Chiefs, Service Commands and old students of Achimota School.

In his tribute, which was read by the then Minister of Presidential Affairs, Jake Obetsebi-Lamptey, President Kufuor described Chapman as, "distinguished statesman who deserved national honours while he was alive."

== Honours ==
- In 1960, Chapman was a recipient of the Commander of British Empire (CBE) award (Civil Service Division).
- The Agricultural College, Greensbore North Carolina U.S.A bestowed upon him an Honorary Doctor of Laws Degree.
- In 2015, Chapman Nyaho was honoured posthumously by the Ministry of Foreign Affairs and Regional Integration for helping shape Ghana's foreign policy as Ghana's permanent representative to the UN and Ghana's ambassador to the United States of America. His name is engraved on three conference room halls in the office of the Ministry of Foreign Affairs and Regional Integration.

== Publications ==
While working as an Ewe language examiner for the Cambridge University School Certificate Examination, he observed a considerable lack of understanding of the Ewe customs among his candidates. This resulted in a publication he started together with F. K. Potakey, also a teacher at Achimota College, called Ewe Studies. Together, they worked on another book titled Anlo Constitution, which covered Ewe customs and institutions. He continued with a series of research on the history and geography of the Ewe people and this resulted in two publications by the names:

- Our Homeland (Book 1 - A Regional Geography of South East Gold Coast), (1945);
- The Human Geography of Eweland (1945).

== See also ==
- List of Ghana Ambassadors to the United States of America
- Ghana Academy of Arts and Sciences
- 1960 Birthday Honours
