= Eric Kwamina Otoo =

Ghanaian diplomat

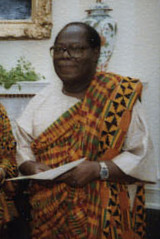
- Otoo in 1983

Ghana Ambassador to the United States of America
- In office 9 December 1982 – 18 October 1990
- Appointed by: John Jerry Rawlings
- Preceded by: Ebenezer Amatei Akuete
- Succeeded by: Joseph Leo Seko Abbey

Ghana ambassador to Germany
- In office 1972 – 6 September 1974
- Appointed by: Ignatius Kutu Acheampong
- Preceded by: Francis Lodowic Bartels
- Succeeded by: Harry Reginald Amonoo

Ghana High Commissioner to Kenya
- In office August 1970 – 1972
- Appointed by: Kofi Abrefa Busia
- Preceded by: Johnson Kwaku Djeckley Appiah
- Succeeded by: S. M. Adu Ampoma

Personal details
- Born: 1926 Koforidua, Eastern Region, Gold Coast
- Died: 1 March 2004 (aged 77–78) Accra, Ghana
- Education: University of Ghana
- Occupation: Diplomat

Eric Kwamina Otoo (1926 – 2004) was a Ghanaian diplomat. He served as Ghana's High Commissioner to Kenya from August 1970 to July 1972, Ghana's Ambassador to Germany from August 1972 to 6 September 1974, and Ghana's Ambassador to the United States of America from 9 December 1982 to 18 October 1990.

== Early life and education ==
Otoo was born on July 26, 1926, to Joseph Benjamin Kobina Asuantsi Otoo and Elizabeth Adjua Kakraba Otoo nee Annor-Cofie. He started his elementary school in Cape Coast, at Oguaa School near what became known as the Jubilee School. He was of a staunch Catholic parentage, however, in 1941, he sat for and passed the entrance exams for a Methodist Boys School - Mfantsipim School, Cape Coast and was awarded a scholarship. He entered Mfantsipim in January 1942 where he received his secondary education. Towards the end of 1946, he successfully passed with a First Grade in the University of Cambridge School Certificate and was admitted to the Wesley College of Education, in Kumasi. He completed the two years teacher training course, and passed with Certificate A - Grade I. From there he gained admission into the University of Ghana formerly Achimota College also University College of the Gold Coast, established in 1948. There he read and obtained from the University of London his Bachelor of Arts (Hons) degree in History on July 31, 1953. The University College of the Gold Coast was then a constituent college of the University of London, which meant that the University College of the Gold Coast was unable to award its own degrees.

== Career ==
Prior to joining the Ghanaian Foreign Service in April 1959, Otoo taught History, Latin, English and Current Affairs at Mfantsipim School. From 1959 to 1960, Otoo was the Chargé d'affaires in the Ghanaian embassy in Monrovia, Liberia. In 1960, he was made the secretary of the Congo Coordination Committee at the Office of the President. This was during the Congo crisis in the early 1960s. He served in this capacity until 1962. While serving at the office of the president, he was a member of a delegation appointed by the then president, Dr. Kwame Nkrumah to the Soviet Union (now Russia) in 1961. In November 1963, he was moved to the Ministry of Defence to serve as its Principal Secretary (now Deputy Minister). He held this office until the overthrow of Kwame Nkrumah in February 1966. During the tenure of the new government (NLC government), the Ghanaian military was being restructured under a new command and he was appointed secretary to the President responsible for matters of security. During this period, he was Ghana's representative at various conferences. Between May 1966 and July 1970, he was appointed Second Secretary to Ghana’s Permanent Mission at the United Nations, New York, and head of the Economic, Information, and Cultural Department of the Ministry of Foreign Affairs. He was also head of the Political Department of the said Ministry. In August 1970, Otoo was appointed Ghana's high commissioner to Kenya with accreditation to the Kingdom of Lesotho, and concurrently, High Commissioner-designate to Zambia. In August 1972, he was made Ghana's ambassador extraordinary and plenipotentiary to Germany. He served in this capacity until 26 September 1974. Upon his return to Ghana, Otoo returned to the Ministry of Foreign Affairs as a Senior Principal Secretary. He later served as head of the Ministry until his retirement on 2 September 1979. Following his retirement, he served on various boards of the United Nations and the Organisation of African Unity. His service in that capacity was rewarded with the Grand Medal (Civil Division) Orders, decorations, and medals of Ghana, in recognition for his wise counsel, selfless devotion to duty and courageous leadership in the Nation’s service. In 1981, he was made Chairman of the Ghana Broadcasting Corporation. On 9 December 1982, he was called out of retirement and appointed Ghana's ambassador to the United States of America with accreditations to Mexico, the Virgin Islands, Belize, and Saint Kitts and Nevis. He presented his credentials on 17 March 1983 and served in this capacity at the highest diplomatic rank, until 18 October 1990. In 1993, he was appointed and served as a member of the Council of State (Ghana), a constitutional body with the mandate to advise the President of Ghana; and subsequently appointed chairman of GOIL PLC Ghana Oil Company.

== Personal life ==
On April 28, 1956, Otoo married Mary Phillipa Ewuraba Brookman Otoo (née Brookman-Amissah).

== See also ==
- Embassy of Ghana in Washington, D.C.
