= Ekwow Spio-Garbrah =

Ghanaian diplomat and politician (born 1953)

The Honourable Ekwow Spio-Garbrah
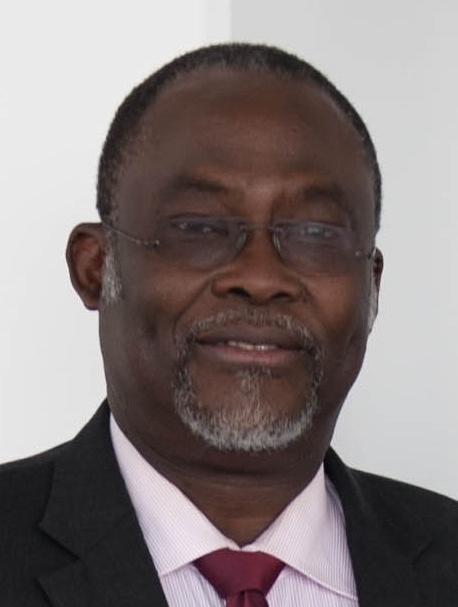

Minister for Trade and Industry
- In office 2014–2017
- President: John Dramani Mahama
- Succeeded by: Alan John Kyerematen

Minister for Education
- In office 1998–2001
- President: Jerry John Rawlings

Minister of Communications
- In office 1997–1998
- President: Jerry John Rawlings
- Deputy: John Dramani Mahama
- Succeeded by: John Dramani Mahama

Ghana Ambassador to the United States of America
- In office 11 August 1994 – 7 November 1997
- President: Jerry John Rawlings
- Preceded by: Joseph Leo Seko Abbey
- Succeeded by: Koby Arthur Koomson

Personal details
- Born: Ekwow Spio-Garbrah; 1953 (age 72–73) Kumasi, Ashanti Region, Ghana
- Party: National Democratic Congress (Ghana)
- Education: University of Ghana; Ohio University
- Occupation: Diplomat, Banker, entrepreneur and marketing and corporate communications professional

Ekwow Spio-Garbrah (born 1953) is a Ghanaian politician who was the minister for trade and industry from 2014 to 2017 in the Mahama administration. He was formerly the minister of communications, minister of education and acting minister of mines & energy in the Rawlings administration. He was Ghana's ambassador to the United States and Mexico. He is a former CEO of the Commonwealth Telecommunications Organisation.

Spio-Garbrah is chairman of the African Business Centre for Developing Education (ABCDE), based in Ghana. He has been a chairman/CEO of several Pan-African non-governmental organizations, CEO of a church, and has held senior positions in banking and financial services. He is chairman of Solarfi, a renewable energy company.

== Early life ==
Spio-Garbrah was born in Kumasi at the Okomfo Anokye Hospital to former Ghanaian ambassador Britton Spio-Garbrah and nurse/midwife and poet Elizabeth Spio-Garbrah.

He began his basic education at the King Tackie School in Accra. His father was the first headmaster and founder of the Konongu Odumase Secondary School. Both his parents are natives of the Central and Western regions of Ghana.

Spio-Garbrah was a student at Achimota School and received a B.A. in English from the University of Ghana. He completed coursework for a master's degree in communications from the same university and obtained a MA in international affairs from Ohio University in Athens. Subsequently, Ekwow received a graduate certificate for International Banking and Finance from New York University in 1984.

== Early career ==
Ekow Spio-Garbrah's early business experience included working as a mortgage banker in New Jersey, as a sales executive with Southwestern Bell, and as chairman of the Middle East Africa Group within the international public relations firm of Hill and Knowlton in New York. In that capacity, from 1979 to 1985, he provided investment, export and tourism promotion counsel to the governments of Indonesia, Turkey, the Netherlands and Austria; financial relations advice to the Hong Kong and Shanghai Bank, Crédit Agricole of France, UBAF-Arab American Bank, and energy sector intelligence to OPEC.

From 1988 to 1991, Spio-Garbrah was a Corporate Relations Officer at the International Finance Corporation, the World Bank affiliate, in Washington, DC. From 1991 to 1994 he was Head of Communication at the African Development Bank, directing the bank's global corporate and marketing communications and acting as institutional spokesman.

== Political appointments ==
=== Ambassador to the United States ===
As Ambassador to the United States from 1994 to 1997, Spio-Garbrah was noted for his success in rebuilding Ghana's image across the United States, including organising an unprecedented eight-city investment promotion programme for Ghana's then-president H.E. Flt Lt. Jerry John Rawlings in the U.S. As a result, partly of the successful bilateral programmes he executed, Ghana became the first country to be visited by U.S. president Bill Clinton during his famous five-country Africa visit in 1998 and is now a recipient of the Millennium Challenge Account. President Clinton's visit to Ghana was also followed by visits from President George Bush and Barack Obama, making it the only sub-Saharan African country to receive all three Presidents.

=== Minister of communication ===
As a minister of communication of Ghana, from 1997 to 1998, Spio-Garbrah initiated, developed and implemented policies and programmes that supported the increasing convergence of telecommunications, broadcasting, the internet, publishing, news media and postal services, all of which were under his supervision. Concurrently, as chairman of the National Communication Authority (NCA), he had responsibility for regulating all aspects of the telecom, Internet and broadcasting sectors. Ekwow Spio-Garbrah was also in charge of the Public Education Committee which successfully re-introduced the VAT to Ghana after a disastrous first attempt in the early 1990s had left several protesters dead. The VAT has since mobilized USD billions for Ghana's socio-economic and infrastructure development in Ghana.

=== Education minister ===
While education minister from 1998 to 2001, Spio-Garbrah was credited with the creation of the Ghana Education Trust Fund (GETFund), which has since mobilized over USD Billions for educational sector infrastructure, transportation, equipment and scholarships. The GETFund law has been widely praised as one of the most transformative pieces of legislation in Africa relating to the education sector.

=== Minister for Trade and Industry ===
From 2014 to January 2017 Ekwow Spio-Grabrah served as Minister for Trade and Industry for the Republic of Ghana. In this position, he led in all aspects of national policy making and initiation of legislation for various aspects of domestic and international trade as well as promoting industry and private sector/business dialogue, and collaboration for Ghana's competitiveness. He supervised agencies such as the Ghana Free Zones Board, the Ghana Export Promotion Authority, the National Standards Authority, the National Board for Small Scale Industries and the Rural Enterprises Programme.

== Other appointments ==
In September 2021 the UK-headquartered Global ECO Capacity Exchange (ECO) appointed Spio-Garbrah as its president for Africa and Global Managing Director. He joined ECO after gaining international credibility through numerous high-level appointments on the world stage for nearly 45 years.

=== CEO Christian Action Faith Ministries ===
In 2011, Spio-Garbrah was appointed chief executive officer of the Christian Action Faith Ministries International. This is a global charismatic movement with millions of members across the world. This appointment made Spio-Garbrah the first person to occupy the position of CEO of a Christian denomination in Ghana. The Church's founder, Nicholas Duncan-Williams is married to the famed US trade expert Rosa Whitaker of the Whitaker Group, once US Under Secretary to Africa.

=== President Dominion University College ===
Between 2012 and 2014, Spio-Garbrah was appointed the president of the Dominion University College, Accra, Ghana, which is a private Christian University founded by Nicholas Duncan-Williams. He was responsible for all aspects of strategic planning for the academic programmes, financial and accounting policies, and human resources and administrative systems for the operations of the private Christian University.

== Presidential bid ==
In December 2006, Spio-Garbrah contested the leadership of Ghana's main opposition party, the National Democratic Congress (NDC). Managing 8.7% of the vote, he came second to John Atta Mills, who subsequently won Ghana's 2008 presidential election. He remains a leading member of Ghana's current ruling party, the National Democratic Congress NDC. On 15 January 2010, Spio-Garbrah was elected a vice chairman of the NDC. He was named director of the communications of the party from 2001 to 2003.

Political offices
| Preceded by Edward Salia | Minister for Communications; 1997 – 1998 | Succeeded by John Mahama |
| Preceded by Christina Amoako-Nuamah | Minister for Education; 1998 – 2001 | Succeeded by Christopher Ameyaw-Akumfi |
| Preceded by Haruna Iddrisu | Minister for Trade and Industry; 2014 – 2016 | Incumbent |
