= Movement for Change (Ghana) =

Political group

The Movement for Change (M4C) is a political group founded by Alan John Kyerematen. The group was started in September 2023 after Kyerematen withdrew from the New Patriotic Party's flagbearership race to contest as an independent candidate in the 2024 Ghanaian general election. The Movement’s logo features the Monarch Butterfly (Afrafranto in Akan), symbolizing political change, transformation, hope, and positivity. As a leader, I draw inspiration from the butterfly’s representation of strength, endurance, spirituality, and trust. The Movement’s motto, “Ghana Will Rise Again,” reflects a hopeful vision for the nation's future. The Movement for Change (M4C) is a political organization whose establishment was inspired by the overwhelming demand by Ghanaians from all walks of life for change and to transform Ghana into a prosperous, united, and peaceful nation.

Alan Kyerematen is a distinguished Ghanaian leader with extensive experience in international trade, public policy, enterprise development, politics, diplomacy, and law. Born on October 3, 1955, in Kumasi to Dr. Alexander Atta Yaw Kyerematen and Mrs. Victoria Kyerematen (née Welsing), he received his secondary education at Adisadel College and Achimota School. He later earned a degree in Economics from the University of Ghana and became a qualified Barrister-at-Law from the Ghana Law School.

== Alan's Vision. ==
I envision a Ghana where all citizens have the chance to succeed. Through industrialization, innovation, and entrepreneurship supported by a skilled workforce, the country will develop a sustainable economy. Youth will be empowered to shape their futures, and communities will thrive as centers of growth and opportunity.

== Pillers of The Movement For Change ==
- Moving Ghana Beyond the Duopoly
- Establish a Government of National Unity
- Build consensus on a National Development Agenda
- Inspiring Behavioural and Attitudinal Change
- Lead the Process of Constitutional Reforms in Ghana
