= Annan Cato =

Ghanaian diplomat (born 1939)

Annan Arkyin Cato

Ghana’s High Commissioner to the United Kingdom
- In office 27 June 2006 – 2009
- President: John Kufuor
- Preceded by: Isaac Osei
- Succeeded by: Kwaku Danso-Boafo

Personal details
- Born: Annan Arkyin Cato; 6 May 1939 (age 86) Gold Coast
- Education: Achimota School
- Alma mater: University of Ghana (BA); Ghana Institute of Management and Public Administration (Dip.)
- Occupation: Diplomat; Civil Servant

Annan Arkyin Cato (born 6 May 1939) is a Ghanaian diplomat. He served as Ghana's High Commissioner to the United Kingdom from 2006 to 2009. Previously, he served as Secretary to the Cabinet in John Kufuor's first presidential term from 2001 to 2005.

== Early life ==
Annan Cato was born on 6 May 1939. He attended Achimota School from 1953 to 1959, and afterwards enrolled at the University of Ghana where he obtained a B. A. in History in 1963. Cato continued his studies at the Ghana Institute of Management and Public Administration (GIMPA) where he obtained a Diploma in Public Administration and International Affairs in 1964.

== Career ==
In 1964, Cato joined the Ghana Foreign Service. He served in Ghana's diplomatic missions in Addis Ababa, Rome, New York, Geneva and London. In London, Annan held the post of Deputy High Commissioner before assuming the post of Acting High Commissioner between 1985 and 1987. In 1987, Cato was seconded to the Osu Castle (then the seat of the Ghanaian government) as Director of State Protocol. In 1992, Cato was reassigned as Ghana's High Commissioner to Canada by Jerry Rawlings. In 1997, Cato completed this assignment and was appointed to the role of Chief Director at the Ministry of Foreign Affairs. Whilst in this post, he acted as Ghana's High Commissioner to the United Kingdom from June 2000 to February 2001. That same year, Cato retired from the Ghana Foreign Service.

In 2001, Cato was appointed by John Kufuor as Secretary to the Cabinet. Cato held office until 2005. In 2006, Cato was appointed Ghana's High Commissioner to the United Kingdom by John Kufuor. He took up duties as High Commissioner to the United on 27 June 2006. This assignment ended in 2009.
