= Harry Reginald Amonoo =

Ghanaian diplomat (born 1928)

Ghana ambassador to Germany
- In office 6 September 1974 – 1977
- Appointed by: Ignatius Kutu Acheampong
- Preceded by: Eric Kwamina Otoo
- Succeeded by: Franz Abadio Yao Djaisie

Ghana Ambassador to the United States of America
- In office 18 July 1972 – 8 May 1974
- Appointed by: Ignatius Kutu Acheampong
- Preceded by: Johnson Kwaku Appiah
- Succeeded by: Samuel Ernest Quarm

Ghana ambassador to Ethiopia
- In office 28 September 1968 – 2 July 1972
- Appointed by: Joseph Arthur Ankrah
- Preceded by: Ebenezer Moses Debrah
- Succeeded by: Annan Cato

Personal details
- Born: 1928 Gold Coast
- Died: before 2018
- Education: University of Ghana
- Occupation: diplomat

Harry Reginald Amonoo (1928–before 2018) was a Ghanaian diplomat. He served as Ghana's ambassador to Ethiopia from 1968 to 1972, Ghana's Ambassador to the United States of America from 1972 to 1974, and Ghana's ambassador to Germany from 1974 to 1977. Prior to his ambassadorial appointments Amonoo served as principal Secretary to various ministries between 1963 and 1967. Amonoo died prior to 2018.

== Early life and education ==
Amonoo was born in 1928. He studied history at the University of Ghana (then the University College of the Gold Coast), where he graduated in 1952 with a Bachelor of Arts degree in history.

== Career ==
After his tertiary education, Amonoo entered the Gold Coast Administrative Service in 1952. He joined the Ghana Foreign Service in 1955 and two years later was appointed second secretary at the embassy of Ghana in Washington. A year later, he became the first Secretary to the Ghanaian permanent mission to the United Nations. In 1963 he was made the principal Secretary to Ministry of Foreign Affairs, and the Ministry of African Affairs in 1964. In 1967 he was made principal Secretary to the Ministry of Defence. He served in this capacity until 28 September 1968, when he was appointed Ghana's ambassador to Ethiopia. Amonoo remained Ghana's ambassador to Ethiopia until 2 July 1972. On 18 July 1972, he was appointed Ghana's Ambassador to the United States of America, succeeding Johnson Kwaku Appiah who had served as Ghana's Chargé d'affaires to the United States of America from 2 July 1972, when his ambassadorial duties in Ethiopia came to end, until 18 July 1972, when he was appointed Ghana's ambassador to the United States of America. Amonoo held this office from 18 July 1972 until 8 May 1974. On 6 September 1974 he was appointed Ghana's ambassador to Germany. He held this post until 1977.

== See also ==
- Embassy of Ghana in Washington, D.C.
