= Henry Van Hien Sekyi =

Ghanaian diplomat

Permanent Representative to the United Nations in New York
- In office 1979–1981
- Appointed by: Hilla Limann

High Commissioner to United Kingdom
- In office 1972–1975
- Preceded by: A. B. Attafua

Ambassador to Italy
- In office 1970–1972

Ambassador to Australia
- In office 1966–1970
- Appointed by: Joseph Arthur Ankrah

Personal details
- Born: January 15, 1928 Cape Coast, Central Region, Gold Coast
- Died: September 15, 2005 (aged 77)
- Education: Adisadel College
- Alma mater: University of Ghana; University of Cambridge; London School of Economics
- Occupation: diplomat

Henry Van Hien Sekyi (15 January 1928 - 15 September 2005) was a Ghanaian diplomat. He was Ghana's High Commissioner to Australia from 1966 to 1970, Ambassador to Italy from 1970 to 1972, High Commissioner to United Kingdom from 1972 to 1975, Permanent Representative to the United Nations from Ghana from 1979 to 1981.

== Early life ==
Henry Van Hien Sekyi was born on January 15, 1928, in Cape Coast in the Gold Coast. His father, Kobina Sekyi, a lawyer and politician, named him after an uncle, Henry van Hien.

Sekyi had his secondary education at Adisadel College. He enrolled at the University College of the Gold Coast which granted its degrees in a special relationship with the University of London. There, Sekyi received a B. A. in Classics specializing in Ancient Philosophy with First Class in 1953. He continued his studies at King's College, Cambridge and graduated with B. A. in Classical Studies in 1955. He returned to the Gold Coast and joined the Civil Service in 1955. He received further training in international relations at the London School of Economics from 1955 to 1956.

On 18 January 1958, Sekyi married Maria Joyce Techie-Menson, a daughter of Sir Charles W. Tachie - Menson.

== Foreign Service career ==
Sekyi joined the Ghanaian Foreign Service in 1957. In 1962, Sekyi served briefly at the Ghana embassy in Rome as Counsellor. Between 1962 and 1965, he held appointments in divisions within the Ministry of Foreign Affairs in Accra before becoming Acting Principal Secretary of the Ministry of Foreign Affairs in 1965.

In 1966, Sekyi was appointed High Commission to Australia.

In 1970, Sekyi went to Italy as Ambassador and remained there until 1972.

In 1972, Sekyi was appointed High Commissioner to Britain in succession to A. B. Attafua who was recalled. Sekyi held the position of High Commissioner until 1975 when he came back to Ghana to serve as Director of the Political Affairs Department at the Ministry of Foreign Affairs in Accra. In 1976, Sekyi was promoted as Senior Principal Secretary at the Ministry of Foreign Affairs.

In 1979, Sekyi was appointed as Ghana's Permanent Representative to the United Nations in New York. That same year, he served as one of four elected vice presidents to Hugo Scheltema on the United Nations Economic and Social Council.
