= Francis Badgie =

Ghanaian diplomat (1937-2020)

Ghana’s High Commissioner to the United Kingdom
- In office 7 November 1980 – January 1982
- President: Hilla Limann
- Preceded by: Ebenezer Moses Debrah
- Succeeded by: Kenneth Dadzie

Personal details
- Born: Francis Kelugu Badgie; June 27, 1937 Gold Coast
- Died: 2020 (aged 82–83)
- Education: Tamale Secondary School
- Occupation: agriculturist

Francis Kelugu Badgie (1937-2020) was a Ghanaian public servant and diplomat who was Ghana's High Commissioner to the United Kingdom from November 1980 to January 1982.

== Early life and education ==
Francis Badgie was born on 27 July 1937 in Navrongo. He attended Tamale Secondary School and on completion went on to study agriculture at Kwadaso Agriculture College in Kwadaso.

== Career ==
Badgie was a teacher until he was appointed managing director of the Upper Regional Development Corporation. In 1980, Hilla Limann nominated and appointed Badgie as Ghana's High Commissioner to the United Kingdom. Badgie held office until January 1982 after the overthrow of Limann’s government by the Provisional National Defense Council (PNDC). In 1983, Badgie became a member of the newly founded Ghana Democratic Movement whose aim was to oust the PNDC and re-introduce multi-party democracy.
