= Koby Arthur Koomson =

Ghanaian diplomat

Ghana Ambassador to the United States of America
- In office 7 November 1997 – 2 November 2001
- Appointed by: Jerry John Rawlings
- Preceded by: Ekwow Spio-Garbrah
- Succeeded by: Alan John Kyerematen

Personal details
- Born: May 1951 (age 75) Gold Coast (now Ghana)
- Education: Arkansas State University
- Occupation: diplomat

Koby Arthur Koomson is a Ghanaian diplomat. He served as Ghana's Ambassador to the United States of America from 1997 to 2001.

== Biography ==
Koomson was born in May 1951 in Gold Coast (now Ghana). He had his secondary education at Ghana National College and his tertiary education at Arkansas State University. He served as Ghana's Ambassador to the United States of America from 7 November 1997 to 2 November 2001.

== See also ==
- Embassy of Ghana in Washington, D.C.
