= Alex A. Y. Kyerematen =

Ghanaian social anthropologist (1916–1976)

Commissioner for Local Government
- In office 1966–1969
- Appointed by: Joseph Arthur Ankrah
- Preceded by: Mumuni Bawumia
- Succeeded by: K. K. Anti

Personal details
- Born: 29 April 1916 Kumasi, Gold Coast
- Died: 1976 (aged 59–60)
- Children: Alan John Kyerematen
- Education: Doctorate
- Alma mater: Oxford University
- Profession: Social anthropologist

Alexander Atta Yaw Kyerematen (1916 – 1976) was a Ghanaian social anthropologist and the commissioner for local government from 1966 to 1969. Kyerematen was the first director of the Ghana National Culture Centre in Kumasi and previously also served as Town Clerk of the Kumasi Municipal Council.

== Early life and education ==
Kyerematen was born in Kumasi on 29 April 1916. He had his early education at Kumasi Government Boys School from 1923 to 1931, and his secondary education at Adisadel College in Cape Coast from 1932 to 1936. During his final year in the school, he served as head boy. Kyerematen continued his education at Fourah Bay College from 1939 to 1940. He also studied at St. Chad's College, Durham, (from 1946 to 1947) where he received his BA degree. Kyerematen also studied at Keble College, Oxford, from 1947 to 1950, and at King's College, Cambridge, from 1965 to 1966. From Oxford University he earned a diploma in Anthropology in 1948, a Bachelor of Letters in 1950 and his doctorate degree in 1966.

Kyerematen was awarded a United National Fellowship in 1952 to study federal–state or provincial–city government and diplomatic service in Canada and the United States for six months. During this period, the Canadian government awarded him a diploma in public administration. In 1960, he received a grant from the Italian government to study organization of cultural institutions for nine months. In 1963, the Federal Republic of Germany invited Kyerematen to be part of a five-man team to visit cultural institutions in Germany.

== Career ==
Kyerematen served as secretary to the Asanteman council and was a research fellow of African studies at the University College of the Gold Coast. He was also the town clerk for the Kumasi Municipal Council in the 1950s, a position which is equivalent to being a mayor.

Kyerematen established the Kumasi Cultural Centre (later the Centre for National Culture in Kumasi) and served as its first director. In this role, he aided in the acquisition of land from the Asantehene for the construction of the center and allowances required to finance projects for the center. He also directed many plays for the Centre. Kyerematen acted as vice-president of the Sociological Society of Ghana and served as chairman of the council of the University of Science and Technology in Kumasi.

Kyerematen was also a member of several associations in Ghana, such as Historical Society of Ghana, The Sociological Society of Ghana, and The Society of Town Clerks of Great Britain and Northern Ireland.

== Personal life ==
Alex A. Y. Kyerematen married Victoria Kyerematen. Together they had six children, three boys and three girls. Ghanaian politician Alan John Kyerematen is his third son. He enjoyed art, music, dance, and drama.

Alex A. Y. Kyerematen died in 1976, aged 59 or 60.

== Publications ==
- Adae-Kesie festival in Kumasi (1952)
- Asante Cultural Center (1958)
- Regalia for an Asante Durbar (1961)
- Panoply of Ghana (1964)
