= Nii Quaynor =

Ghanaian scientist and engineer

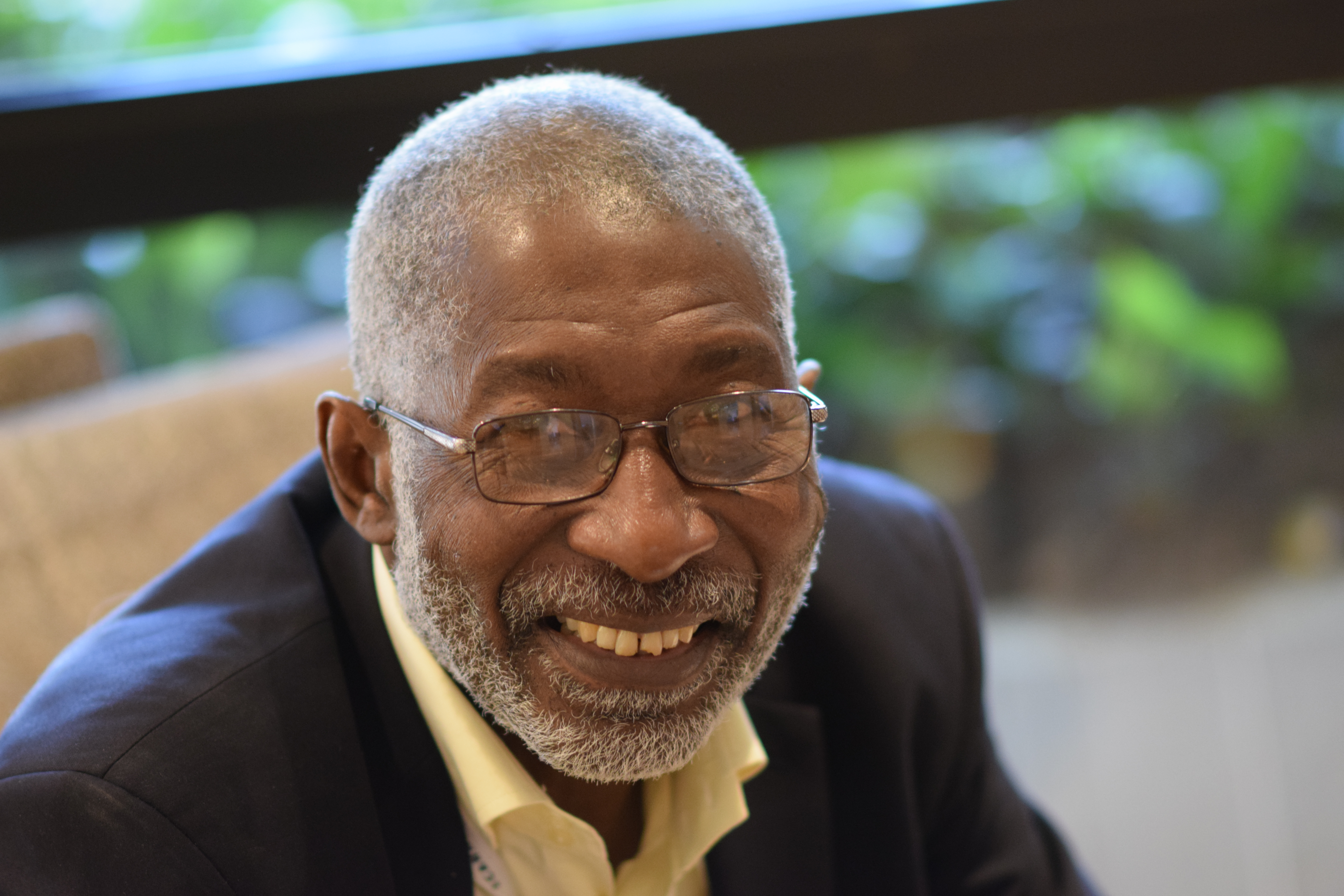
- Born: Nii Narku Quaynor; 1949 (age 76–77)
- Education: Kinbu School; Adisadel College; Achimota School; Dartmouth College (BA, Engineering Science; BSc. Engineering); Thayer School of Engineering; State University of New York at Stony Brook (M.S.; Ph.D.)
- Occupation: Computer scientist
- Known for: Developing telecommunications and internet in Africa
- Title: Professor
- Awards: Jonathan B. Postel Service Award; Internet Hall of Fame

Nii Narku Quaynor (born 1949) is a Ghanaian scientist and engineer who has played an important role in the introduction and development of the Internet throughout Africa.

== Biography ==
Quaynor attended Kinbu School, Adisadel College and Achimota School in Ghana. He graduated in engineering science from Dartmouth College in 1972, and received a Bachelor of Engineering degree from the Thayer School of Engineering in 1973. He then studied Computer Science, obtaining an M.S. from the State University of New York at Stony Brook in 1974, and a Ph.D. from the same institution in 1977.

He is one of the founding members of the Computer Science Department at the University of Cape Coast in Ghana, and continues to hold a professorship there. He is also a member of the Council of the University of Ghana.

In 2000, he became director of ICANN for the African region.

== Work with telecommunications and the internet ==
On Quaynor's return to Ghana from the United States in the early 1990s, he established some of Africa's first internet connections and was involved in setting up some key organisations, including the African Network Operators Group (AfNOG). He introduced Value Added Networks in the region through the introduction of the SWIFT, Internet and Commerce networks, and was founding chairman of AfriNIC, the African numbers registry.

Quaynor is the chairman of the Ghanaian company Network Computer Systems, and a member of the United Nations Secretary General Advisory Group on ICT, member of the ITU Telecom Board, chair and of the OAU Internet Task Force, President of the Internet Society of Ghana, and member of the Worldbank Infodev TAP.

Quaynor also serves as a Commissioner for the Global Commission on Internet Governance.

Interview with Quaynor on his time as a board member of ICANN

== Awards and recognition ==
In December 2007, Quaynor was awarded the Jonathan B. Postel Service Award from the IETF (The Internet Engineering Task Force).

On 26 June 2013, he was selected for induction into the Internet Hall of Fame by the Internet Society.

He was awarded the 2015 ICANN Multi-stakeholder Ethos Award together with Cheryl Langdon Orr
