= Samuel Ernest Quarm =

Ghanaian diplomat (born 1932)

Ghana ambassador to Switzerland
- In office 15 October 1984 – 1989
- Appointed by: Jerry John Rawlings
- Preceded by: William Ato Wilson
- Succeeded by: Kojo Amoo-Gottfried

Ghana Ambassador to the United States of America
- In office 19 August 1974 – 15 January 1978
- Appointed by: Ignatius Kutu Acheampong
- Preceded by: Harry Reginald Amonoo
- Succeeded by: Moses Kwasi Agyeman

Ghana ambassador to Algeria
- In office May 1969 – May 1970
- Appointed by: Akwasi Afrifa
- Preceded by: Anthony Korsah-Dick
- Succeeded by: Yaw Albert Osebre

Personal details
- Born: 1932 Axim, Gold Coast
- Education: Adisadel College; University of Ghana; Oxford University; National Institute for Oriental Languages and Civilizations
- Occupation: Diplomat

Samuel Ernest Quarm (born 1932) was a Ghanaian diplomat. He served as Ghana's ambassador to Algeria from 1969 to 1970, Ghana's ambassador to France from 1970 to 1974, Ghana's Ambassador to the United States of America from 1974 to 1978, and Ghana's ambassador to Switzerland from 1984 to 1989.

== Early life and education ==
Quarm was born in 1932 at Axim, Gold Coast. He had his secondary education at Adisadel College and proceeded to the University of Ghana (then the University College of the Gold Coast). He later studied at Oxford University and the National Institute for Oriental Languages and Civilizations.

== Career ==
Quarm joined the Ghanaian foreign service and was made head of Chancery in Liberia from 1957 to 1958, and Japan from 1960 to 1963. He was the assistant secretary, and senior assistant secretary of the Ministry of Foreign Affairs from 1958 to 1960 and from 1963 to 1964 respectively. From 1964 to 1965, he was the counsellor for the USSR and a year later, he was appointed deputy High Commissioner to the United Kingdom. He served in this capacity until the overthrow of Kwame Nkrumah in 1966.

During the tenure of the then new government (NLC), Quarm was appointed director of the International National Organisations Department of the Ministry of Foreign Affairs. A year later, he was made the deputy permanent representative of Ghana to the United Nations. In May 1969, Quarm was appointed Ghana's ambassador to Algeria. He served in this capacity until May 1970 when he was made Ghana's ambassador to UNESCO. In 1972, he became the Supervising Director of the Political Department and acting senior principal secretary of the Ministry of Foreign Affairs. He was appointed Ghana's Ambassador to the United States of America from 19 August 1974 to 15 January 1978.

He returned to Ghana in 1978 to head the Political Department of the Ministry of Foreign Affairs and also serve as principal secretary of the ministry. In October 1984, he was appointed Ghana's ambassador to Switzerland, and held this office until 1989.

== Personal life ==
Quarm is married, with four children. He speaks French fluently.

== See also ==
- Embassy of Ghana in Washington, D.C.
