= Joe Lartey =

Ghanaian journalist and commentator (1927–2024)

- Born: Joachim Awuley Lartey; 6 June 1927; Accra, Gold Coast (now Ghana)
- Died: 26 April 2024 (aged 96); Ghana
- Education: Accra Academy; Wolsey Hall, Oxford
- Occupations: Presenter; Commentator; Journalist
- Years active: 1961–1973, 1978–1990
- Employer(s): Ghana Broadcasting Corporation (1961–1973, 1990); Federal Radio Corporation of Nigeria (1978–1990)
- Spouse: Emily Lartebia Adjei

Joachim Awuley Lartey (6 June 1927 – 26 April 2024) was a Ghanaian commentator and journalist. He worked with the Ghana Broadcasting Corporation from 1961 to 1973 and 1990, and with Federal Radio Corporation of Nigeria between 1978 and 1990. Lartey was ranked amongst the top five African football commentators by Goal, an international association football news website. He was the first president of the Sports Writers Association of Ghana (SWAG).

== Early life and education ==
Lartey was born on 6 June 1927 at Lutterodt Street in Accra to Emmanuel Akushey Lartey and Madam Emma Araakua Lartey. His father worked with the Treasury Department.

Lartey started his education at Accra Royal School around 1933. Not long after, his father was transferred to Cape Coast and he went with him. However, before he could find another school, his father took ill and was brought back to Accra.

In 1935, his father was transferred to Tamale. He decided to go alone because of the distance. A journey to Tamale from Accra at the time lasted three days. Lartey, his younger brother and his mother were left behind. A few months later, his younger brother took ill and died, without ever recovering. His father had to come for him and his mother. At Tamale, Lartey enrolled at the Tamale Middle Boarding School, but his father sought permission for him to be a day student, since he fell sick often.

In 1938, his father returned to Accra and Lartey was sent to Government Senior Boys School at Kinbu to continue his education. He completed middle school in 1943 and was admitted to the Accra Academy in 1944. He followed events of the Second World War by listening to the war speeches of British Prime Minister Sir Winston Churchill, on radio, and by reading magazines.

After less than a year at the Accra Academy, he left home for Takoradi to join the British Royal Navy. He was sent to Free Town, Sierra Leone for further training. In 1945, the war had ended and his group was demobilised in 1946.

== Career ==
Lartey first got a job as a clerk at the Accra Town Council, working under the Town Clerk Major McDougel. He then pursued a course on his own with Wolsey Hall to prepare for Cambridge Certificate (O’Level).

There was a special resettlement package for those discharged from the British Royal Navy, as part of which, Lartey was given a scholarship to train as a teacher. He did the Certificate "B” at Winneba Training College, passing out after two years. Because of the Cambridge Certificate he obtained from Wolsey Hall, he was able to do his post-certificate training at Wesley College, Kumasi. He spent five years teaching at Larteh, Kwanyako, Swedru, Nyakrom and Accra until 1961.

=== GBC ===
in 1961, Lartey joined Ghana Broadcasting Corporation, spending two years in the Talks and Features Department before being sent to the Sports Department on relieving duties. Festus Addae, who headed the department, refused to let Lartey go back to the Talks and Features Department.

Lartey flourished as a commentator at the Sports Department. He and Addae handled commentary together, and this was when the phrase "over to you Joe Lartey" became popular. Any time Addae was handing over to Lartey, he would use the expression.

Lartey was also involved in trade unionism while at GBC. He was divisional secretary of the Public Service Workers Union for six years, directly working under Kwesi Pratt Snr, the General Secretary and father of Kwesi Pratt Jnr.

=== Politics ===
Lartey left the GBC in 1973 and joined the Food Distribution Corporation that same year as a public relations practitioner, but he left in 1978 to go into private practice.

During the era of the Supreme Military Council (Ghana), he was involved in the activities of the People's Movement for Freedom and Justice (PMFJ) that opposed UNIGOV under Gen. Ignatius Kutu Acheampong, working in the trenches with Nana Akufo-Addo, Komla Agbeli Gbedemah and others. He moved to Lagos, Nigeria when the leaders of the movement were being pursued, and stayed there until 1990.

=== FRCN ===
During his 12-year spell with the Federal Radio Corporation of Nigeria, Lartey worked with Ishola Folorunsho, the ace Nigerian commentator, who was well known in Ghana and also a good friend of his. Aside handling some programmes on Radio Nigeria, he also taught at the FRCN Training School at Ikoyi, where he had the opportunity to train young Nigerian broadcasters in public speaking and public relations.

=== Return to GBC ===
On his return in 1990, he hosted programmes such as Sports Digest and Hall of Fame on GTV while teaching public speaking to various groups.

Lartey was the first president of the Sport Writers Association of Ghana (SWAG), of which he was a patron.

Lartey taught presentation at the Accra Film School.

== Honours and legacy ==
On 12 June 2022, Lartey was honoured with the "A Life in Sports" award by the International Sports Press Association (AIPS) in Doha, Qatar, for his contribution to sports in Africa. "Over to You Radio and TV Sports Broadcast Excellence" is an award ceremony named in his honour for his service in sports broadcasting and journalism. He was also awarded the Lifetime Achievement Award at the 2022 Exclusive Men of the Year Africa Awards.

== Death ==
Lartey died on April 26, 2024, at the age of 96.
