= Kenneth Dadzie =

Kenneth K. S. Dadzie

Secretary General of the United Nations Conference on Trade and Development
- In office 1 January 1986 – 31 March 1994
- Preceded by: Alister McIntyre (Officer-in-Charge)
- Succeeded by: Carlos Fortin (Officer-in-Charge)

Ghana High Commissioner to United Kingdom
- In office 1994–1995
- President: Jerry Rawlings
- Preceded by: K. B. Asante

Ghana High Commissioner to United Kingdom
- In office 1982–1985
- President: Jerry Rawlings
- Preceded by: Francis Badgie

Personal details
- Born: Kenneth Kweku Sinaman Dadzie; 10 September 1930
- Died: 25 October 1995 (aged 65) London, UK
- Profession: Diplomat

Kenneth K. S. Dadzie (10 September 1930 — 25 October 1995) was a Ghanaian diplomat. He served twice as the Ghanaian High Commissioner to the Court of St James's (UK) and was also the Secretary-General of the United Nations Conference on Trade and Development (UNCTAD) between 1986 and 1994.

== Career ==
Dadzie joined the diplomatic service of the Gold Coast in 1952. He continued with the service after Ghana became an independent nation in 1957. He held several positions in the service and was seconded to senior positions within the United Nations Secretariat both in Geneva and New York. He has also served as Ghana's Permanent representative to the United Nations Office in Geneva. During that tenure, he also served as Ghana's ambassador to Austria and Switzerland.

He was appointed by Jerry Rawlings as Ghana's High Commissioner to the United Kingdom during the era of the Provisional National Defence Council in 1982 and continued in this position till the end of 1985. After retiring from UNCTAD in 1994, he was appointed by the Rawlings government as Ghana's High Commissioner to the UK once again.

== UNCTAD ==
Dadzie became the Director-General for Development and International Economic Cooperation within UNCTAD between 1978 and 1982. He became the fifth Secretary-General of UNCTAD on 1 January 1986. He was the first African to serve in this capacity. He is credited by UNCTAD as having been influential during his time in office in securing the adoption of the Final Act of UNCTAD VII in Geneva which helped establish "consensus on international development cooperation thereby breaking through the barriers of the North-South divide." He was also instrumental in the organisation adopting a "New Partnership for Development" at UNCTAD VIII in 1992 in Cartagena, Colombia.

== Death ==
Kenneth Dadzie died in London aged 65, after a stroke, while still serving as the Ghana High Commissioner to UK. A special meeting of the Economic and Social Council was held during which tributes were paid to his immense contribution to the United Nations and especially UNCTAD.

== See also ==
- United Nations Conference on Trade and Development

Diplomatic posts
Preceded by Alister McIntyre (Officer-in-Charge)	Secretary General of the United Nations Conference on Trade and Development; 1986 – 1994	Succeeded by Carlos Fortin (Officer-in-Charge)
Preceded by K. B. Asante	High Commissioner to United Kingdom; 1994 – 1995	Succeeded by ?
Preceded by Francis Badge	High Commissioner to United Kingdom; 1982 – 1985	Succeeded by ?
