= Tudu, Ghana =

Coordinates: 5°33′N 0°12′W

Tudu
- Urban area
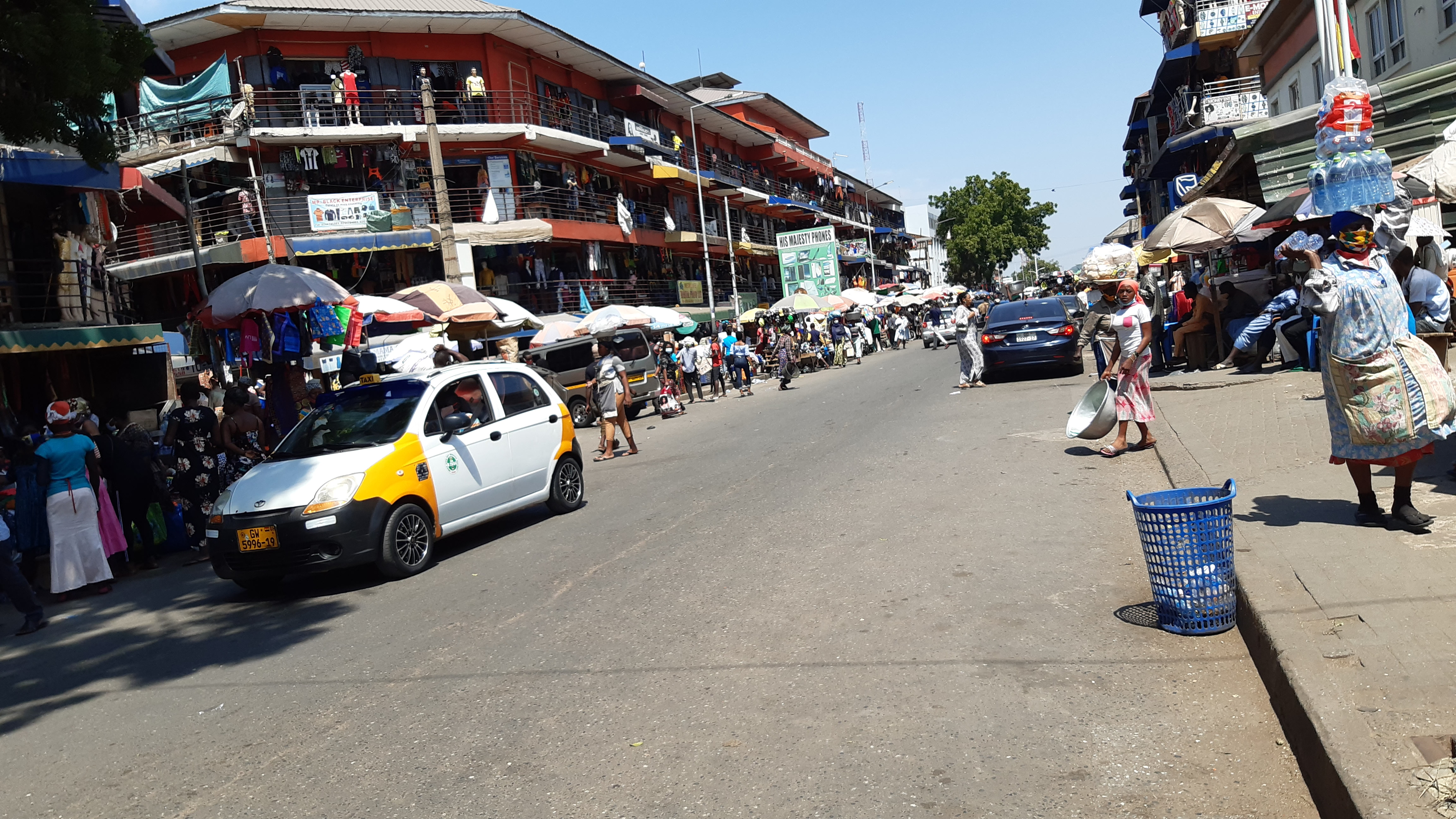
- The main tudu area

- Location within Ghana
- Country: Ghana
- Region: Greater Accra Region
- District: Accra Metropolitan
- Elevation: 187 ft (57 m)
- Time zone: GMT
  - Summer (DST): GMT

Tudu is a suburb of Accra in the Greater Accra Region of Ghana.

== Location ==
Tudu is located within the central business district of Accra.

== Education ==
The Accra Polytechnic and Kinbu Secondary Technical School both located at Kinbu.
