= Alan John Kyerematen =

Ghanaian politician

Alan John Kwadwo Kyerematen
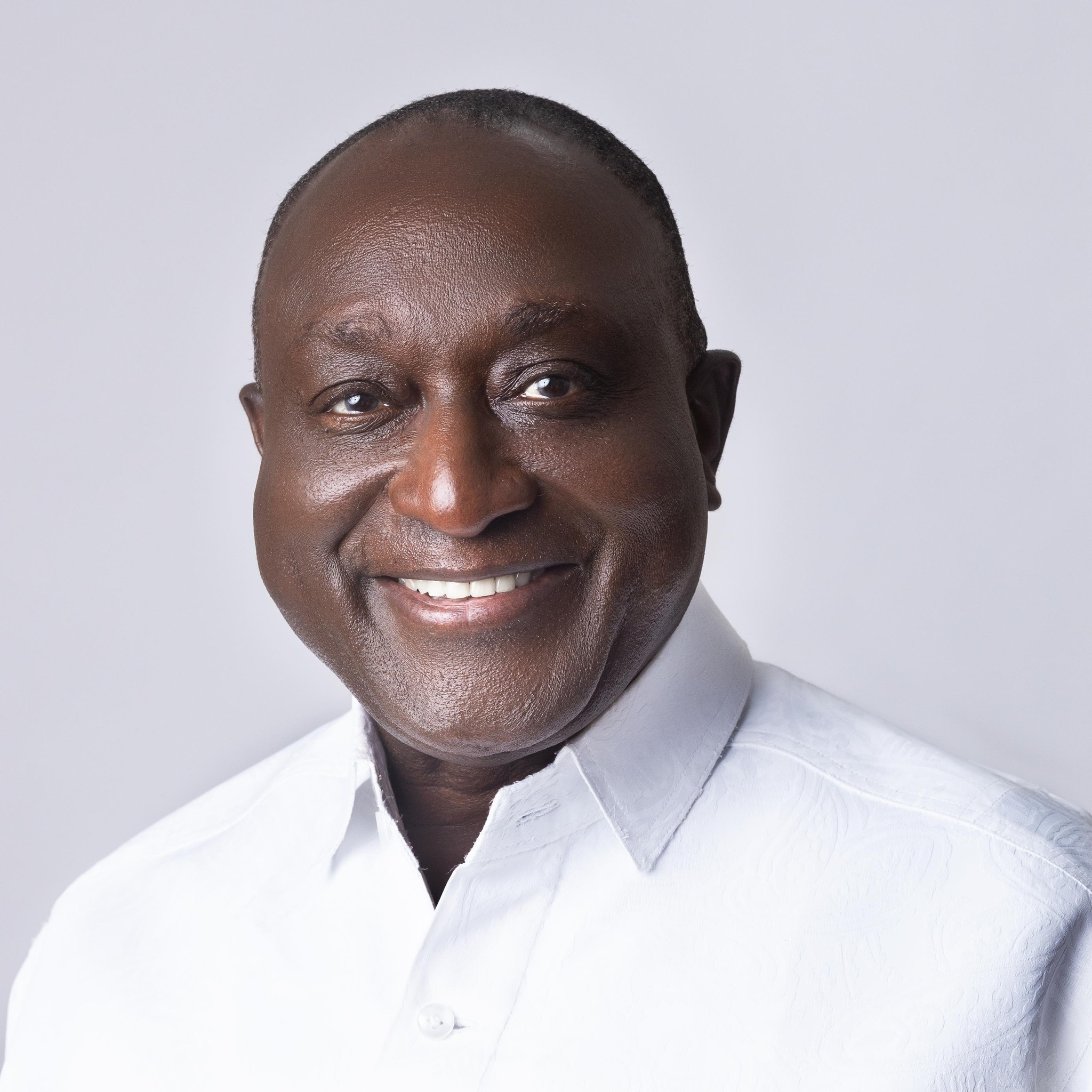

Minister of Trade and Industry
- In office 28 January 2017 – 16 January 2023
- President: Nana Akufo-Addo
- Preceded by: Ekwow Spio-Garbrah
- Succeeded by: Ken Ofori-Atta (acting)

Minister of Trade, Industry, Private Sector Development (PSD) and the Presidential Special Initiatives (PSI)
- In office 2003–2007
- President: John Agyekum Kufuor

Ambassador of Ghana to the United States of America
- In office 7 January 2001 – 2003
- President: John Agyekum Kufuor
- Preceded by: Koby Arthur Koomson
- Succeeded by: Fritz Kwabena Poku

Personal details
- Born: 3 October 1955 (age 71) Kumasi, Ghana
- Party: Movement for Change
- Spouse: Patricia Christabel Kyeremanten
- Relations: Alex A. Y. Kyerematen (father)
- Children: 2
- Education: Adisadel College; Achimota School; University of Ghana; Ghana School of Law; University of Minnesota
- Occupation: Corporate executive lawyer
- Website: https://alankyerematen.org/

Alan John Kwadwo Kyerematen (born 3 October 1955) is a Ghanaian politician, a corporate executive, and a former member of the New Patriotic Party. He was Ghana's Minister for Trade and Industry from 2017 to 2023. He was also Ghana's Ambassador to the United States from 2001 to 2003 and later as Minister of Trade and Industry, Private Sector Development (PSD), and Presidential Special Initiatives (PSI) during the John Kufuor's administration. Kyerematen has served as a trade advisor at the United Nations Economic Commission for Africa (ECA) in Addis Ababa, Ethiopia, where he coordinated the African Trade Policy Centre (ATPC).

In September 2023, Alan John kwadwo Kyerematen parted ways from the current party New Patriotic Party after losing the party's flagbearership race. He then proceeded to form his own political party named Movement for Change, an Independent political movement that will contest the 2024 general elections with him as Presidential Candidate.

== Early life ==
Alan John Kwadwo Kyerematen was born on Monday, 3 October 1955 to Alexander Atta Yaw Kyerematen, a social anthropologist from Pataasee, Kumasi and Victoria Kyerematen (née Welsing) from Elmina and Ejisu. He was named after an archbishop in the Church of England, Alan John Knight, who was his father's mentor and the headmaster of the all-boys Anglican boarding school, Adisadel College in Cape Coast in the 1930s. Alexander A. Y. Kyerematen, Alan's father was then a student at the school and later, a boys prefect in his final year.

In 1951, his father was the founder and first director of the Centre for National Culture located in Kumasi of the Ashanti Region and later on, he was appointed the mayor of Kumasi and then Commissioner for local government between 1966 and 1969 during the regime of the National Liberation Council.

Alan Kyerematen attended Adisadel College for his secondary education, entering the institution at the age of nine years after starting at then Asokore Mampong Secondary School, now Kumasi Academy. He attended Achimota School afterward for his sixth form education.

He is a graduate of Economics from the University of Ghana and a barrister-at-law from the Ghana Law School. He is a Hubert Humphrey fellow of the School of Management at the University of Minnesota in America, having completed a year management studies under the Fulbright Fellowship program.

== Corporate career ==
Alan John Kyerematen has had a career in both the private and public sectors for over two decades. He began his career as a junior manager where he rose to become senior corporate executive at the age of twenty-two with a subsidiary of Unilever Ghana, becoming one of the youngest individuals to hold such a position. He also worked for several years as a principal consultant and head of Public Systems Management with the Management Development and Productivity Institute (MDPI).

In 1998, Kyerematen was appointed by the UNDP as the first regional director of Enterprise Africa, which was an Africa-wide, flagship initiative for the development and promotion of small and medium enterprises. Under that framework, he established enterprise support institutions and programmes in 13 Sub-Saharan Africa countries, including Botswana, Benin, Cameroon, Democratic Republic of Congo, Ethiopia, Mauritius, Mozambique, Namibia, Nigeria, Senegal, South Africa and Uganda. Over 4,000 African entrepreneurs and small businesses have benefited from these programmes.

In 1990, Kyerematen established and managed the EMPRETEC Programme in Ghana, a business development programme sponsored by the United Nations and Barclays Bank. EMPRETEC turned from a UN project into an independent foundation, with him as its founding chief executive. Between 1984 and 1990, he participated in and managed several major private and public sectors consulting assignments in Ghana, as a principal consultant and head of Public Systems Management with the Management Development and Productivity Institute (MDPI).

Kyerematen is a member of the Council of Governors of the British Executive Service Overseas (BESO) in the UK and also a board member of other organizations in Ghana.

In 1994, Kyerematen was listed by the Time magazine as one of the 100 global leaders for sector millennium, alongside Bill Gates, John F. Kennedy Jr., and others.

== Diplomacy and international public service ==
Kyerematen was appointed Ghana's ambassador to the U.S. when the NPP came into office from 2001 to 2003. He served as a trade advisor at the UN Economic Commission for Africa (ECA) in Addis Ababa, Ethiopia. He headed the African Trade Policy Centre (ATPC); a centre created by the ECA with the main objective of strengthening the human and institutional capacities of African governments to formulate and implement sound trade policies and participate in trade negotiations at the bilateral, regional and multilateral levels.

Kyerematen is one of the members of the technical team that provided strategic guidance and support to the African Union Commission in developing and elaborating an Action Plan for Boosting intra-African Trade and preparing a framework for the establishment of a Continental Free Trade Area. As part of this effort, he was designated as a Special Envoy of the African Union to hold consultations with selected African Heads of State prior to the 18th African Union Summit of Heads of State and Government in January 2012.

Ghana, on 17 December 2012, nominated Kyerematen for the post of WTO Director-General to succeed Pascal Lamy, whose term of office was due to expire on 31 August 2013. His candidature received the backing of the Africa Union (AU) but he did not make the final shortlist for the position.

== Politics ==
=== Party advocacy ===
Kyerematen is a founding member of the New Patriotic Party (NPP) and has also served on the highest decision-making bodies of the NPP both in opposition and in Government.

He served as a member on the NPP National Executive Committee from 1992 to 2001. He has also served as a member of the Economic Management Team and member of the party's Finance Committee. He is also a Founding Member of the Young Executive Forum (YEF), a youth advocacy and lobbying group of the NPP. He was Chairperson of the forum from 1992 to 2001.

Kyerematen has been one of few to have held membership on the National Executive Committee for years and under the successive Chairpersons including B.J. DaRocha, Peter Ala Adjetey, Samuel Odoi-Sykes and Haruna Esseku. As a result of his contribution to strategy development, he was appointed a Member of the NPP/CPP Great Alliance Negotiating Team.

Kyerematen made an attempt at the leadership of the New Patriotic Party in 2007, capturing 32.30% of votes cast. He was first runner-up to Nana Addo Dankwa Akufo-Addo who gained 47.96% of votes cast. He made another attempt in 2010 where he placed second with 20.40% of total valid votes cast to Nana Akufo-Addo's 77.92%. In 2014, he once again came second to Akufo-Addo in the presidential primaries to elect a flag-bearer to lead the NPP in the 2016 general elections. At the congress organised to shortlist the number of prospective candidates from 7 to 5, Kyerematen polled 7.97% of the valid votes cast compared to Akufo-Addo's 80.81%. In the final presidential primary to select the flagbearer, Kyerematen was first runner-up with 4.75% of the votes while archrival Akufo-Addo received 94.35% of the votes to win the contest.

He has been nicknamed as Alan Cash. Once asked by a journalist how he became known in the Ghanaian media and political landscape as "Alan Cash," Kyerematen said it happened because in his political campaigns, he stressed the importance of creating jobs and "real cash" for the people. On 25 September 2023 Alan Kyeremanten quit NPP and decided to contest 2024 general election as an independent candidate.

=== Cabinet minister ===
In 2003, Alan Kyerematen was appointed as the Cabinet Minister with responsibility for Trade, Industry and the President's Special Initiatives (PSI) with additional responsibility for Private Sector Development (PSD). In that capacity, he spearheaded the development and implementation of innovative programmes which have become new strategic pillars of growth for the transformation of the Ghanaian economy.

His tenure as Trade Minister saw the establishment of an $8.5 million cassava processing factory to produce high grade industrial starch from for export to key markets in Europe, Africa and Asia. The starch initiative created over 10,000 jobs and piloted a new innovative approach to rural industry development based on the concept of Corporate Village Enterprises. In addition, it was considered as a model in linking developing countries into the global supply chain through industrial agro-processing. The first industrial starch company was certified as a global supplier of high grade starch to Nestle operations worldwide.

He also led the construction of a multimillion-dollar enclave within the Tema Free Zone, dedicated to garments manufacturing for the export market by Ghanaian entrepreneurs. The enclave is also being extended and converted to accommodate similar facilities for Furniture Manufacturing and an ICT Park, thus converting part of the Free Zones into a multi-purpose Industrial Park. Alan also oversaw the establishment of Export Trade Houses, the establishment of a "Furniture City" at Tema - an enclave for manufacturers of wood export products, the establishment of product galleries to promote Made-in-Ghana goods and the establishment of a Technology Innovation Center for Capital Goods Manufacturing. He helped in the revival of the Oil Palm industry in Ghana achieved growth in seedlings: supply rose from 250,000 seedlings per annum in 2001 to 4 million as at the end of 2004, from twelve nursery sites. Programme initiated under which over 102,000 hectares of Oil palm plantation is being cultivated. He also mobilized new investments to expand Salt mining operations in Ghana and provide a stable raw material base for the development of a caustic soda industry to feed other manufacturing industries. Ghana's non-traditional export sector has grown from $400 million in 2000 to the level of $800 million in 2005. He ensured the roll-out and implementation of the Districts Industrialisation Programme, a comprehensive programme for rural industrialization involving the setting up of at least one medium-sized factory in each administrative district in Ghana.

As Minister for Trade and industry, he has coordinated the Government of Ghana's trade policy agenda in respect of multilateral trade negotiations, including WTO, EU-ACP Economic Partnership Agreement and ECOWAS. He played lead roles in both the regional preparatory process towards the WTO Cancun and Hong Kong Ministerial Meetings, particularly during the latter, in which he was one of the privileged few amongst Trade Ministers in the World, to have been appointed as a member of the Chairman's Consultative Group. He was also the only Trade Minister from Africa to have been selected as a panelist on Trade during the 2006 World Economic Forum in Davos. He was one of the lead negotiators for Africa in the WTO Ministerial Conference in Cancun in 2003, and also participated in the high-level “Green Room” consultations during the Hong Kong WTO Conference in December 2005.

He led the negotiation and development of bilateral trade and economic relations between the Government of Ghana and its major trading partners, including the UK, US, Canada, Germany, France, Italy, Japan, China, Denmark, South Africa, Nigeria, etc. He had been a leading member of the NPP Government team promoting Ghana abroad and attracting and facilitating foreign direct investment into the country and has also been responsible for developing a comprehensive internal trade and import management portfolio aimed at enhancing the competitiveness of local products, promoting fair trade and protecting consumer interests as well as promoting Made-in-Ghana products through campaigns such as the highly successful "National Friday Wear" programme.

Under his direction, a comprehensive Ghana Trade Policy was launched as a major plank in the government's strategy for accelerating and sustaining economic growth and increasing incomes and employment. He led the process of preparing a $200-million implementation blueprint, called the Trade Sector Support Programme (TSSP), which was launched in October 2005.

He also negotiated a $45 million facility with the World Bank to promote small and medium enterprise development in Ghana. Another major achievement of Kyerematen was to develop the Trade Ministry into a professional service organization with the Ministry being restructured into strategic business units with an efficient programme coordination and management system.

Additionally, as part of a government investment delegation, Alan Kyerematen was instrumental in the negotiation of the contract that led to the arrival of US start-up company, Kosmos Energy, to Ghana to explore and discover oil in commercial quantities. In May 2017, President Nana Akufo-Addo named Alan Kyerematen as part of the nineteen ministers who would form his cabinet. The names of the 19 ministers were submitted the Parliament of Ghana and announced by the Speaker of the House, Rt. Hon. Aaron Mike Oquaye.

His other accomplishment is the development the Trade Ministry into a professional service organization with the Ministry being restructured into strategic business units with an efficient programme coordination and management system.

=== Resignation as a Cabinet Minister ===
On Saturday, 7 January 2023, Alan Kyeremanten took to Twitter now X to announce his resignation as cabinet minister responsible for trade and industry effective 16 January. Sources indicate that he wrote to the presidency indicating his intention to resign effective from 16 January 2023 and this was accepted by President Akufo-Addo.

=== Flagbearership ===
On Wednesday, 11 January 2023, Alan John Kyerematen officially announced his intention to contest the NPP’s flagbearership and underwent a successful vetting process on Monday, 3 July. On 26 August 2023, the former Trade Minister placed third with 95 votes, representing 10.29% of total votes cast qualifying him for the New Patriotic Party presidential primaries in November. However, he took to social media on 5 September to announce his decision to resign from contesting his party's national delegate congress which was slated for 4 November 2023.

==== Resignation From New Patriotic Party (NPP) ====
On Monday, 25 September 2023, Alan John Kyerematen resigned from New Patriotic Party (NPP), after resigning from NPP's flagbearership with immediate effect to contest as an independent presidential candidate (Movement For Change) for the presidential race in the 2024 Ghanaian general election to be held in December. As he said: "My intention to contest as an independent presidential candidate will not affect NPP."

=== Movement for Change ===
The movement for change came as a result of Alan John Kyerematen resignation from the New Patriotric Party (NPP) to contest as an independent candidate for the 2024 General Election. The brand logo for the MOVEMENT is the Monarch Butterfly, which politically symbolizes change and transformation, hope, and positivity. It also communicates strength, endurance, spirituality, and trust, which are key traits that I cherish as a Political Leader. In Akan, it is known as Afrafranto. The brand motto of the MOVEMENT is “Ghana Will Rise Again,” which symbolizes hope for the future of Ghana. The four dominant themes for the change agenda that will be pursued by the MOVEMENT are as follows:

- Change the political status quo by moving Ghana beyond the duopoly of the two main political parties in Ghana; the NPP and NDC.
- Promote the establishment of a Government of National Unity
- Build consensus on a National Development Agenda
- Inspire behavioral and attitudinal change in the people of Ghana

== Personal life ==
Coming from a mixed Akan ancestry of the Asante and Fante ethnic subgroups, he speaks Twi and Fante fluently. In addition, he speaks Ga and is proficient in French. He is married to Patricia Christabel Kyerematen (née Kingsley-Nyinah), the daughter of Joseph Kingsley-Nyinah who was an Appeal Court Judge and the Electoral Commissioner for Ghana between 1978 and 1981, including 1979 presidential election. They have two children - Alexander and Victor. Alan Kyerematen's sister Bridget Kyerematen – Darko died in a gas explosion in January 2017. Alan Kyerematen along with his elder brother Stephen Kyerematen are managing directors of A Wealth of Women Ghana BKD (Bridget Kyerematen Darko), led by Dr. Sandi Williams, PhD a foundation formed to support their late sister's work and legacy. The foundation is affiliated to A Wealth of Women.
