= Miguel Augustus Francisco Ribeiro =

Ghanaian diplomat

Ghana Ambassador to Italy
- In office 1966–1970

Ghana Ambassador to United States of America
- In office 25 April 1963 – 8 August 1966
- Preceded by: William Marmon Quao Halm
- Succeeded by: Abraham Benjamin Bah Kofi

Ghana Ambassador to Germany
- In office 1962–1963
- Preceded by: Theodore Owusu Asare
- Succeeded by: George Eric Kwabla Doe

Ghana Ambassador to Ethiopia
- In office 2 September 1959 – 3 April 1962
- Succeeded by: Ebenezer Moses Debrah

Personal details
- Born: Miguel Augustus Francisco Ribeiro; 2 February 1904 Cape Coast
- Occupation: Diplomat

Miguel Augustus Francisco Ribeiro (born 2 February 1904 in Cape Coast) was a Ghanaian diplomat.

== Early life and education ==
Ribeiro was born on 2 February 1904 in Cape Coast. He is a member of the Tabom family, a family that traces its roots from Brazil.

He had his early education at Winneba and Elmina Methodist Elementary Schools, and continued at Mfantsipim School from 1919 to 1923 for his secondary education. He had his tertiary education at the Institute of Education, University of London from 1938 to 1939.

== Career ==
After his secondary education, Ribeiro taught at Mfantsipim School from 1924 to 1931, and Achimota College as a junior staff member from 1931 to 1939.

Ribeiro was the first ambassador of Ghana to Ethiopia between 2 September 1959 and 3 April 1962. From 1962 to 1963 he succeeded Theodore Owusu Asare to become Ghana's ambassador to Germany. On 25 April 1963, Ribeiro was appointed Ghana's ambassador to the United States of America, he held that appointment until 8 August 1966.

As Ghana's ambassador to the USA, he represented the Ghanaian government to sign the Treaty to ban nuclear weapons testing in the atmosphere, in space and under water in August 1963. Following his work in the United States, Ribeiro was appointed as Ghana's ambassador to Italy from 1966 to 1971.
