= Kinbu Senior High Technical School =

Mixed second cycle institution in Accra, Ghana

Information
- Motto: Knowledge, Skills and Aptitude
- Established: 1874; 152 years ago
- Head of school: Mrs. Sylvia Letcher-Teye

Kinbu Secondary Technical School in Ghana has a history which dates back to 1874 in the era of Governor Rowe. The school was set up to make provision for the mulattoes who found it difficult to mix with the whites at that time. It was told that the mulattoes felt more closeness to the indigenous people than to the whites, this actually made it possible for the establishment of the school. During the colonial regime, it was called government Boy's Senior School (Rowe-Road's School and later became Kinbu Middle Boys School).

With the introduction of the Educational Reform Programme in 1976, The Kinbu Middle Boys School faced out for the establishment of the first ten Experimental Junior Secondary Schools as a pilot programme in Ghana. Currently, it offers courses such as science, technical science, metal work, woodwork, building construction, visual arts, home economics, general arts and business. It is next to Ghana Education Service, Tudu.

Head of School : Mrs. Sylvia Letcher-Teye

Motto: Knowledge, Skills and Aptitude

Governing Body: Board of Governors

Status: Day

== Notable alumni ==
- Jonathan Nii Tackie Kommey, teacher and politician
- Alfred Jonas Dowuona-Hammond, politician and state minister
- Joe Lartey, commentator and journalist
- Nii Quaynor, scientist and engineer
