= Ghana Free Zones Authority =

The Ghana Free Zones Authority (GFZA), is a Ghanaian government-controlled institution formed on 31 August 1995 to facilitate the setting up of Free Zone in Ghana to improve the economic development and to regulate its related activities. It was enacted by an Act of Parliament, the Free Zone Act 1995 (Act 504).

The authority was planned to improve the processing and manufacturing of goods through the formation of Export Processing Zones (EPZs) to boost the development of commercial and service activities at the sea and airport areas. It was also intended to make Ghana available to possible investors who have the freedom of using the free zones to boost the production of goods and services for foreign markets. In essence therefore, the whole of Ghana is accessible to potential investors who have the opportunity to use the Free Zones as focal points to produce goods and services for foreign markets.

== Structure ==
=== The Board ===
The President in deliberation with the Council of State appointed nine members of the Free Zones Authority which was presided over by the Minister of Trade and Industry. It started in September 1996 and the board worked under the regulation (L.I. 1618). The main aim of the board was to facilitate, regulate and monitor the activities in the free zones.

The Board which was the top of the organizational structures was supported by other committees. These committees were

- Finance and Administration Committee
- Project Evaluation, Licensing and Legal Committee
- Works and Acquisition Committee
- Compliance Committee
- Corporate Affairs and Investment Committee

The Ghana Free Zones Authority's new CEO is now Dr. Mary Awusi., who was chosen by President Mahama.

== Operation ==
In order to promote investments and increased economic activity within the economy, free zones are places where businesses are taxed at extremely low rates or none at all. As a result of the establishment of free zones, products imported by businesses operating in them are generally considered to be outside of the customs territory and are therefore tax-exempt. Essentially, all transactions with Customs take place "outside jurisdiction" in Free Zones. The GFZA was established to facilitate the establishment of free zones in Ghana and to oversee activity inside those zones. In Ghana, businesses that are registered with the GFZA are subject to 1% income tax during the first ten (10) years of operation and 15% tax thereafter.

A company operating in a free zone must export at least seventy percent (70%) of its annual output. Additionally, no more than 30% of total annual output may be sold to the local market. It must be emphasised that local market sales are subject to Ghanaian customs law and are consequently taxable. As long as they are not ecologically dangerous, a licensed free zone firm is allowed to create any kind of goods or services for export.

To be eligible for licensing under the free zones programme, a firm needs to be recognised as a body corporate under the Companies Act 1963 (Act 179) or as a partnership under the Private Partnership Act 1962 (Act 152).

== Partners and Stakeholders ==
The agency works with other government agencies. Some of these agencies it works with includes Bank of Ghana, Ghana Ports and Harbours Authority, Ghana Revenue Authority, Ghana Immigration Service, Lands Commission, Driver Vehicle And Licensing Authority(DVLA) and many others.
