= Gordon Hadow =

Sir Gordon Hadow (23 September 1908 – 1993) was deputy governor of the Gold Coast from 1954 to 1957, and coordinated its transition to independence. At the time this was considered the model for independence from Great Britain in Africa.

Gordon Hadow was born in Cairo, Egypt, where his father, Frank Burness Hadow was a Church Missionary Society missionary. He returned to England aged seven whilst his parents were working in Calcutta. He attended Marlborough College and Trinity College, Oxford. He began working in the Gold Coast in 1932. He was knighted in the 1956 New Year Honours.

After Ghana's independence, Hadow spent ten years on special commissions for the United Nations and British government, mainly in Africa.
