= Johnson Kwaku Appiah =

Ghanaian diplomat

Johnson Kwaku Djeckley Appiah

Ghana Ambassador to the United States of America
- In office 2 July 1972 – 18 July 1972
- Appointed by: Ignatius Kutu Acheampong
- Preceded by: Ebenezer Moses Debrah
- Succeeded by: Harry Reginald Amonoo

Ghana High Commissioner to Kenya
- In office 1969–1970
- Appointed by: Joseph Arthur Ankrah
- Preceded by: J. L. Appah-Sampong
- Succeeded by: Eric Kwamena Otoo

Personal details
- Born: Gold Coast
- Occupation: diplomat

Johnson Kwaku Djeckley Appiah was a Ghanaian diplomat who served as head of Ghana's mission to the United States of America. He served as Ghana's Charge de Affair to the United States of America from 2 July 1972 to 18 July 1972. Prior to this appointment, he was Ghana's High Commissioner to Kenya from 1969 to 1970, and First Secretary to the Ghana permanent mission to the United States of America from 1962 to 1964.
