= Alex Quaison-Sackey =

Ghanaian diplomat (1924–1992)

Hon. Alex Quaison-Sackey
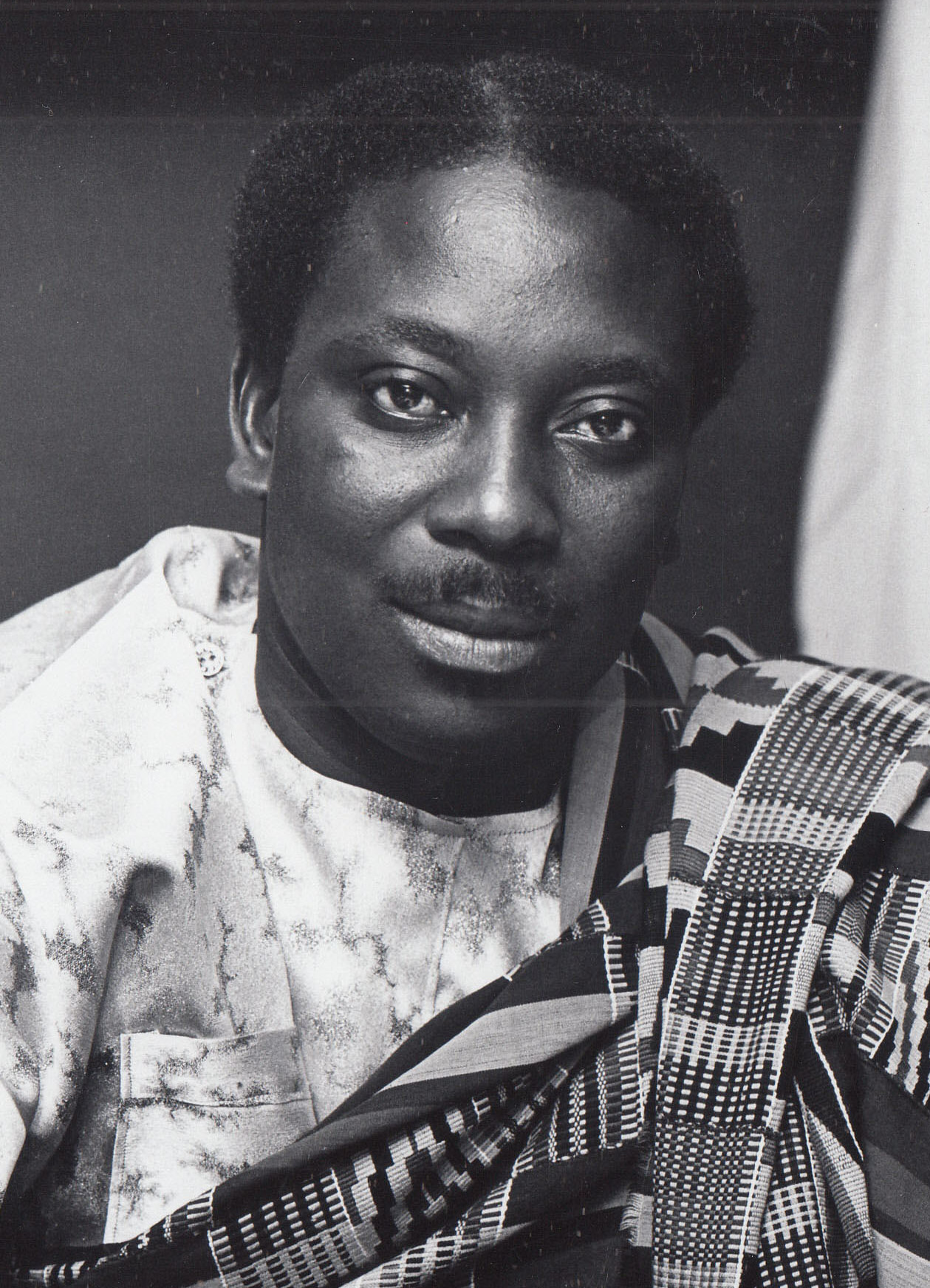
- Quaison-Sackey in 1964

Minister for Foreign Affairs
- In office 1965–1966
- President: Kwame Nkrumah
- Preceded by: Kojo Botsio
- Succeeded by: Lt Gen Joseph A Ankrah

19th Session President of the United Nations General Assembly
- In office 1964–1965
- Preceded by: Carlos Sosa Rodriguez
- Succeeded by: Amintore Fanfani

2nd Ghana Permanent Representative to the United Nations
- In office 30 June 1959 – 1965
- President: Kwame Nkrumah
- Preceded by: Daniel Chapman
- Succeeded by: Fred Arkurst

Personal details
- Born: 9 August 1924 Winneba
- Died: 21 December 1992 (aged 68) Accra
- Party: Convention Peoples' Party
- Spouse: Elsie Annie Blankson
- Children: Egya, Nana, Awo, Kweku Bondzie, Nenyi (Nii) and Yaaba
- Occupation: Diplomat

Alex Quaison-Sackey (9 August 1924 – 21 December 1992) was a Ghanaian diplomat who served during the first and third republics. He was the first black African to serve as president of the United Nations General Assembly.

== Early life and education ==
Quaison-Sackey was born at Winneba in the Central Region of Ghana. He received his secondary education in Ghana at Mfantsipim School at Cape Coast in the Central Region and studied at the Intermediate Department at Achimota College near Accra. He then went to the United Kingdom, where he studied Philosophy, Politics and Economics at Exeter College, Oxford University, graduating with an honours degree. He also studied international relations and international law at the London School of Economics after being appointed one of Ghana's first Foreign Service officers.

== Diplomatic service ==
He served as Ghana's second ambassador and permanent representative to the United Nations from 30 June 1959 to 1965. He served as President of the United Nations General Assembly from 1964 to 1965, becoming the first black African to hold that position. During that time, Quaison-Sackey was also Ghana's ambassador to Cuba from 1961 to 1965 and ambassador to Mexico from 1962 to 1964. In 1965, he became foreign minister of Ghana, but served in that position for only a few months, as he was dismissed when President Nkrumah was overthrown in February 1966. He was again appointed Ambassador to the United States in 1978 by the Supreme Military Council led by Lt. General Fred Akuffo.

== Politics ==
Quaison-Sackey was appointed Minister for Foreign Affairs in Kwame Nkrumah's Convention People's Party government. He was on a trip to North Vietnam with Nkrumah when the government was overthrown by a military coup d'état leading to the formation of the National Liberation Council on 24 February 1966 led by Lt. General Joseph Arthur Ankrah.

== Death ==
Quaison-Sackey died aged 68 at Korle Bu Teaching Hospital in Accra, following a pulmonary embolism on 21 December 1992.

== Family ==
Quaison-Sackey's parents were Alex Emmanuel Sackey (1902–1972) and Alberta Quaison. He married Elsie Annie Blankson (1927–2003). Together, they had six children.

== Publications ==
Quaison-Sackey later wrote about his experiences of diplomatic issues in Ghana's early days in a book called Africa Unbound: Reflections of an African Statesman, which was published by Praeger in May 1963. In it he describes his concept of "Negritude" - "Acceptance and affirmation of the quality of blackness. It is a psychological gathering together of all black peoples in the spiritual bonds of brotherhood."

Diplomatic posts
Preceded by Carlos Sosa Rodriguez	President of the United Nations General Assembly; 1964–65	Succeeded by Amintore Fanfani
Preceded by Daniel Chapman	Permanent Representative to the United Nations; 1959–65	Succeeded by Fred Arkurst
Preceded by	Ambassador to Cuba; 1961–65	Succeeded by
Preceded by	Ambassador to Mexico; 1962– 64	Succeeded by
Preceded by	Ambassador to the United States; 1978–80	Succeeded by
Political offices
Preceded by Kojo Botsio	Foreign Minister; 1965–66	Succeeded by Lt. Gen. Joseph A. Ankrah
