= Asrifi Bonsu Attafua =

Ghanaian diplomat

High Commissioner of Ghana

Personal details
- Died: 1997 Ghana

Asrifi Bonsu Attafua (died 1997) was a Ghanaian diplomat and High Commissioner.

== Career ==
Attafua served at the United Nations Development Program in Nigeria and Uganda.
