= K. B. Asante =

Ghanaian diplomat (1924–2018)

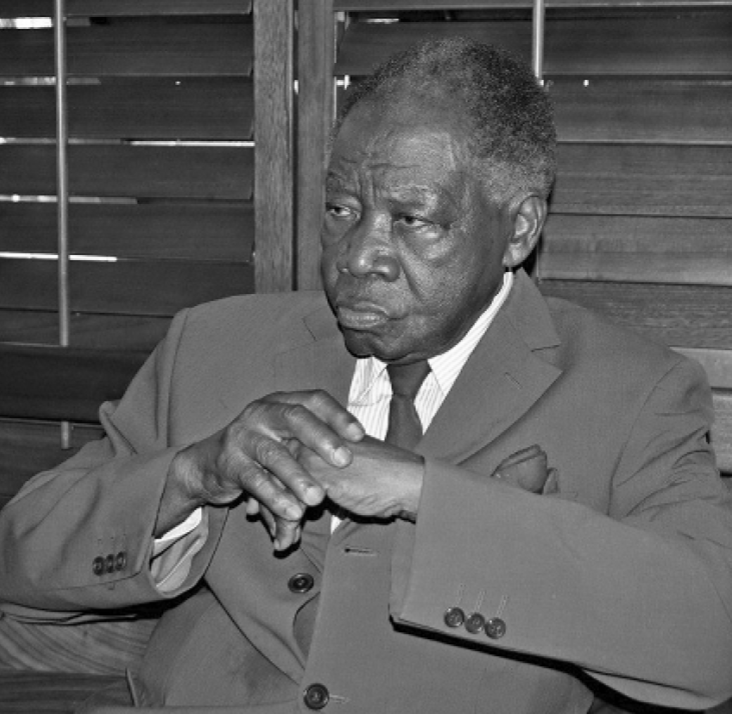

Ambassador of Ghana to Belgium
- In office 1976–1978

Ambassador of Ghana to Switzerland
- In office 22 August 1967 – 7 July 1972
- Preceded by: Richard Akwei
- Succeeded by: Osei-Tutu

Personal details
- Born: Kwaku Baprui Asante; 26 March 1924 Greater Accra Region, Gold Coast
- Died: 21 January 2018 (aged 93) Greater Accra Region, Ghana
- Spouse: Dzagbele Matilda Asante
- Children: 5
- Education: Achimota College; University College, Durham (BSc)
- Occupation: Diplomat

Kwaku Baprui Asante (26 March 1924 – 22 January 2018) was a Ghanaian diplomat, government official and writer. Asante served as the Principal Secretary at the African Affairs Secretariat from 1960 to 1966. He then held several foreign service posts before being appointed a PNDC Secretary. He was Ghana’s High Commissioner to the United Kingdom from 1991 to 1993.

Asante was educated at Achimota School and later returned there to teach Mathematics.

== Early life and education ==
Born in Accra, Gold Coast, on 26 March 1924, K. B. Asante attended the O'Reilly Educational Institute, Tudu, Government Junior Boys' School, Adabraka, and Government Senior Boys’ School, Kinbu, from 1927 to 1937. From 1938 to 1942, he attended Achimota College Upper Primary and Secondary School, where also he taught mathematics (1945–48). He then proceeded to Durham University in Britain, where he obtained a BSc Mathematics degree in 1952.

== Career ==
Asante became a member of the Institute of Statisticians in 1953, before returning to Achimota College, where from 1953 to 1955 he taught mathematics.

He worked for six years at The Flagstaff House, and was Principal Secretary at the African Affairs Secretariat (1960–66). From 1967 to 1972, he was Ghana's Ambassador to Switzerland, also with concurrent to Australia, and from 1976 to 1978 he served as Ambassador to Belgium, Luxembourg, and the European Economic Community.

=== Provisional National Defence Council government ===
Between 1982 and 1986, Asante served as Secretary for Trade and Tourism in the Provisional National Defence Council (PNDC) government led by Jerry Rawlings. Asante also served as Secretary for Education and Culture between 1986 and 1990. Between 1991 and 1993, he was High Commissioner to the United Kingdom and Ireland.

Asante wrote a weekly column, "Voice from Afar", in the national newspaper, the Daily Graphic. In 2003, a collection of his weekly articles was published as a book with the same title as his column.

== Personal life ==
He married Dzagbele Matilda Asante and they had five children. Asante was a lifelong congregant of the Anglican Church. He was also a Freemason, belonging to the District Grand Lodge of Ghana under the United Grand Lodge of England.

== Death and funeral ==
Asante died on 22 January 2018, at the age of 93. He was accorded a ceremonial burial at the Forecourt of the State House in Accra.
