= St. John's School, Sekondi =

St. John's School
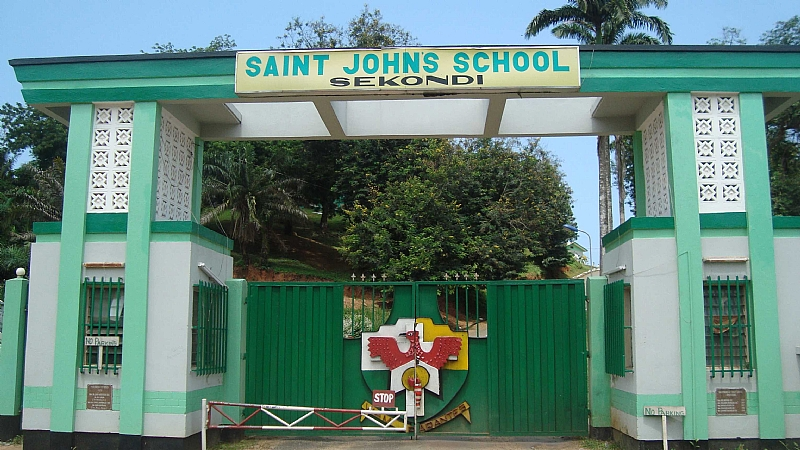
- Main school gate

Location
- P. O. Box 492; Sekondi, Western Region western region Ghana; 4°55′58″N 1°43′42″W

Information
- School type: boys Public high school
- Motto: Viam Parantes (Preparing the way)
- Religious affiliation: Christianity
- Denomination: Roman Catholic
- Patron saint: St. John the Evangelist
- Established: 29 January 1952 (74 years ago)
- Founder: Most Rev. William Thomas Porter, S.M.A.
- Status: Active
- Sister school: Archbishop Porter Girls Secondary School
- School district: Sekondi Takoradi Metropolitan Assembly
- Oversight: Ministry of Education
- Principal: Rev. Fr. George Eduayaw Ansah
- Gender: Boys
- Age: 14 to 18
- Classes offered: Business, general arts, general science, visual arts
- Language: English
- Campus type: Suburban
- Houses: 12
- Colours: Maroon, Yellow and Green
- Slogan: The Saints, The Best
- Song: "St John beloved apostle"
- Sports: Basketball
- Mascot: Koliko (Saint with a halo)
- Nickname: The Saints
- Rival: G.S.T.S; FIJAI
- Alumni: Old Saints
- Website: stjohnsschool.edu.gh

St. John's School is an all-boys' second-cycle Roman Catholic school located at Sekondi in the Western Region of Ghana. The current curriculum falls within the Senior High School system in Ghana, with overall oversight by the Ghana Education Service. Graduates of St. John's School are known as "Old Saints".

== History ==
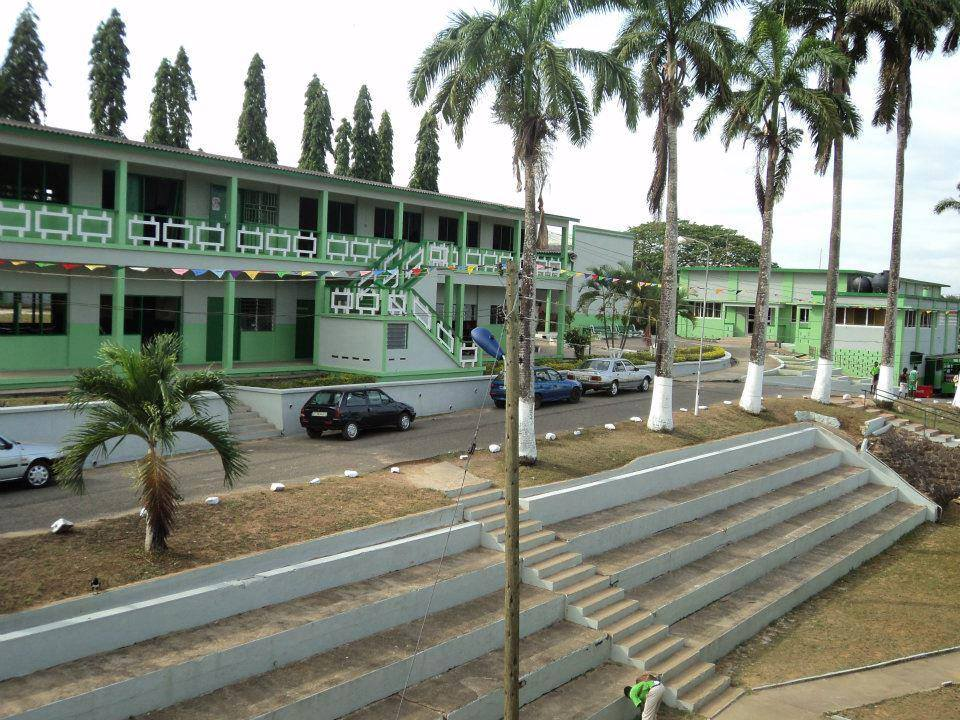
St John's School

St. John's School was founded on January 29, 1952, by Arch bishop William Thomas Porter of the Society of African Missions in response to the government's Accelerated Education policy of 1951. It was founded as a private secondary school and was the first secondary school to be established in the western region. It was named after Rev. John Beenker, the first headmaster of the school. Shortly after assuming the post, Beenker became seriously ill. Rev. Father Donelley served as interim head, and Rev. Father Francis Kwamena Buah was recalled from postgraduate studies at Cork University in Ireland to head the school. The school started with three teachers, F. K. Buah, Donelley, and John Quansah and 47 students in two temporary classrooms.

== Students ==
The students are known as "The Saints" and the past students are known as "Old Saints".

Old Saint Kwesi Kwansa Kennedy, 2018 won the Henry Godson-Afful award of the best performing WASSCE student and was also adjudged the 3rd Best in West Africa 2018 with 8A's

== Headmasters ==
Name	Tenure of office
Rev. Fr. George Eduayaw Ansah	2022 till date
Mr. Anthony J. Mensah	2015-22
Rev. Bro. Sylvester Quaye	2010–15
Rev. Bro. Joseph K. B. Annan, C.S.C.	2001–10
Mrs. Rebecca Efiba Dadzie	2001 (March–July) Acting
Mr. K.A. Afful	1997–2001
Mr. R. A. Sackey	1991–96
Mr. J. S. Honny	1979–90
Mr. B. A. K. Griffin	1974–78
Bro. Raymond Papenfuss, C.S.C.	1973–74
Bro. Frederick McGlynn, C.S.C.	1967–73
Bro. Jerome Chandler	1963–67
Bro. Rex. Hennel, C.S.C.	1959–63
Rev. Fr. F. K. Buah	1952–58

== Houses ==
1. St. Francis
2. St. Edwards
3. St. George
4. St. Augustine
5. St. Ignatius
6. St. Bro. Andre
7. St. Stephen
8. Blessed Fr. Moreau
9. Bro. Jerome
10. Bro. Fredrick
11. Holy Cross
12. Rev. Bro. J.B.K Annan

== Notable alumni ==
=== Sports ===
- Solomon Amegatcher - Olympic Athlete
- Samuel Inkoom - Ghanaian Footballer

=== Politics and law ===
- John Frank Abu - Former Western Regional Minister
- Joseph Kofi Adda - Former Member of Parliament and Minister of Energy
- Yaw Owusu Addo - Former acting Director General of the Ghana Broadcasting Corporation, Municipal Chief Executive of the Kwahu West Municipal District
- P.A.V. Ansah - Ghanaian Politician and Journalist
- Wilson Arthur - Politician and CEO of Skyy Media Group
- Anthony Forson Jnr. - Justice of the Supreme Court of Ghana
- Samuel Johnfiah - Former MP for Ahanta West (Ghana parliament constituency)
- Derrick Nkansah- A member of the National Democratic Congress(NDC) communication Team
- Hon. Frederick Festinous Faidoo - Mayor of Sekondi-Takoradi (2025- Present)

=== Academics ===
- Prof. Ebow Bondzie Simpson - Professor of Law, Barrister, Solicitor and Rector of GIMPA
- Prof. Wisdom Tettey - 17th President and Vice-Chancellor of Carleton University in Canada
- Prof. Kwame Awuah Offei - Professor of Mining Engineering and a member of the 38-member advisory board on mineral and Energy Royalty Policy committee by the United States Secretary of Interior
- Prof. James Hawkins Ephraim - Physical inorganic Chemist and Former Vice Chancellor of Catholic University College of Ghana
- Ellis Owusu-Dabo - Prof. Epidemiology and Global Health and former Pro-Vice Chancellor of Kwame Nkrumah University of Science and Technology

=== Science, Tech and Medicine ===
- Dr. Felix Anyah - Former CEO of the Korle-Bu Teaching Hospital and Owner of the Holy Trinity Spa and Health Farm
- Dr. Charles Owubah - CEO of Action Against Hunger USA
- Eric Asubonteng - President of the Ghana Chamber of Mines and MD for Anglogold Ashanti

=== Military ===
- Peter Faidoo - Chief of Naval Staff of the Ghana Armed Forces
- Major Maxwell Mahama - Late Major of the Ghana Armed Forces lynched by a mob
- Lt-Col Ato Enninful - Pioneer School Prefect and Former Director of Public Relations - Ghana Armed Forces (1974-1980)
- Capt(GN) J.W. Boateng-Chief of Naval Staff (Jan 1982-March 1982)

=== Journalism ===
- David Ampofo - Ghanaian Journalist
- Fiifi Adinkra - Ghanaian blogger and Journalist
- Ato Kwamena Dadzie - Ghanaian writer and Journalist of Joy FM
- Philip Osei Bonsu - Broadcast Journalist, Corporate communications executive and Entrepreneur
- Kojo Frimpong of joy fm npp candidate mp for wench

=== Creative Arts ===
- Joe Beecham- Gospel musician
- Aka Blay - Guitarist and Musical artist
- Shasha Marley - Reggae Musician
- Papa Nii (Osoephagus) - Veteran Ghanaian Actor
- Albert Mensah - Bestselling Author and the only West African listed on the World’s Top 60 Motivational speakers
- Keche - Hiplife Musical Duo

== See also ==
- Education in Ghana
- List of senior high schools in Ghana
- Roman Catholicism in Ghana
