= Kwabena Sarpong-Anane =

Ghanaian academic, lawyer and broadcast executive

Director-General of the GBC
- Acting; 2011–2010
- President: John Atta Mills
- Preceded by: William Ampem-Darko
- Succeeded by: Berifi Afari Apenteng

Personal details
- Education: Prempeh College
- Alma mater: University of Cape Coast; Ghana School of Law; Kwame Nkrumah University of Science and Technology
- Occupation: General manager & Director-General of the GBC (2010–2011); Public Servant
- Profession: Academic; Lawyer

Kwabena Sarpong-Anane is a Ghanaian academic, lawyer and public servant. He served as the acting Director General of the Ghana Broadcasting Corporation from 2010 to 2011.

Prior to his appointment, he was the deputy Director General of the Ghana Broadcasting Corporation.

== Education ==
Sarpong-Anane had his secondary education at Prempeh College and his tertiary education at the Kwame Nkrumah University of Science and Technology, and the University of Cape Coast. He also qualified as a barrister-at-law at Ghana School of Law.

== Career ==
Sarpong-Anane began as a legal practitioner in 1993. While in legal practice he gained employment at the University of Cape Coast where he taught at the School of Business, at the university's College of Distance Education. He taught there from 2002 to October 2021. Prior to his appointment as acting Director General of the Ghana Broadcasting Corporation, he served as the Central Regional Director of Broadcasting Corporation and head of Radio Central (Cape Coast), and in 2007, became the deputy Director General of the Ghana Broadcasting Corporation. From 2010 to 2011, he was the acting Director General of the Ghana Broadcasting Corporation when William Ampem-Darko was relieved of his duties as Director General of the Ghana Broadcasting Corporation. When the National Media Commission appointed Berifi Afari Apenteng as the substantive head of the broadcasting corporation, Sarpong-Anane resumed his duties as deputy Director General of the Ghana Broadcasting Corporation. He served in this capacity until 2013.
