= Hesse family =

Ghanaian family

- Current region: Accra, Ghana
- Origin: Denmark; Germany
- Founded: Arrival on the Gold Coast; 18th century, Osu, Accra
- Founder: Lebrecht Wilhelm Hesse
- Members: List: Regina Hesse; L. J. Chinery-Hesse; Chris Tsui Hesse; L. W. Fifi Hesse; Virginia Hesse; Adukwei Hesse; Herman Chinery-Hesse
- Connected members: List: Mary Chinery-Hesse; Afua Adwo Jectey Hesse
- Connected families: Clerk family
- Distinctions: broadcast journalism; cinematography; civil service; diplomacy; education; filmmaking; law; medicine; ministry; public administration; technology entrepreneurship; trade
- Traditions: Presbyterian

The Hesse family (/ˈhɛsə/) is a Ghanaian family of Dano-German origins. The progenitor of the family was Dr. Lebrecht Wilhelm Hesse, a German medical doctor and a subject of the Danish Crown under King Christian VII. Hesse was an employee of the Danish colonial administration. After qualifying in medicine and surgery, he sailed to the Gold Coast as a young bachelor in the late 1700s to treat chaplains from the Church of Denmark and its latter affiliate, the Danish Missionary Society, civil servants and garrison soldiers stationed at the Christiansborg Castle, now called the Osu Castle. He married a local Ga woman, Lamiorkai, from Osu Amantra in Accra.

During the nineteenth century, the Euro-Ga descendants of Dr. L. W. Hesse were influential in commerce in the Gold Coast colony. Family members later branched into other occupations, becoming bureaucrats and ministers. Additionally, the Hesse family is directly related to the Clerk family through Dr. Hesse's granddaughter, Pauline Hesse (1831–1909), a trader who was married to Alexander Worthy Clerk (1820–1906), a Jamaican Moravian teacher. Clerk was among 24 individuals from the West Indies recruited by the Basel Mission of Switzerland in 1843 and sent to Ghana to establish Protestant churches and schools.

== Notable members ==
- Herman Chinery-Hesse (1963–2024), technology entrepreneur and founder of theSOFTribe
- L. J. Chinery-Hesse (1930–2018), parliamentary draftsman, Solicitor-General and Acting Attorney General (1979)
- Mary Chinery-Hesse (born 1938), international civil servant and diplomat, first woman Chancellor of the University of Ghana, Legon
- Adukwei Hesse, physician-academic, tuberculosis control expert, prison reform advocate and Presbyterian minister
- Afua Adwo Jectey Hesse, First Ghanaian woman to train as a paediatric surgeon
- Chris Tsui Hesse (born 1932), cinematographer, filmmaker, prison reform campaigner and Presbyterian minister
- L. W. Fifi Hesse (1934–2000), First black African Rhodes Scholar, Director-General, Ghana Broadcasting Corporation (GBC), 1972–1974; 1984–1988 and Member, Public Services Commission of Ghana
- Regina Hesse (1832–1898), pioneer woman educator-administrator in colonial Ghana
- Virginia Hesse (born 1944), civil servant and commercial officer at the Ministry of Trade and Industry, Ambassador of Ghana to the Czech Republic (2017–2021)

== See also ==
- Gold Coast Euro-Africans
