= Yaw Owusu Addo =

Ghanaian journalist and broadcasting executive

Director-General of the GBC
- Acting; 2007–2005
- Nominated by: National Media Commission
- President: John Kufuor
- Preceded by: Eva Lokko
- Succeeded by: William Ampem-Darko

Personal details
- Education: St. John's School
- Occupation: general manager & Director-General of the GBC (2005–2007); Public Servant; Politician
- Profession: Journalist

Yaw Owusu Addo is a Ghanaian journalist, public servant, and politician. He served as the acting Director General of the Ghana Broadcasting Corporation from 2005 to 2007.

Prior to his appointment to the helm of the corporation, he was the Director of Radio at the Ghana Broadcasting Corporation. As a journalist, Addo once served as the vice-president and later president of the Ghana Journalists Association. He was appointed Municipal Chief Executive of the Kwahu West Municipal District in 2017.
