= Kabral Blay Amihere =

Ghanaian journalist and diplomat

Kabral Blay-Amihere
- Born: Ekwe, Western Region, Ghana
- Education: St. Augustine's College (Cape Coast); University of Ghana
- Occupations: Journalist, Lecturer, Editor
- Known for: Journalist, Diplomat

Kabral Blay-Amihere is Ghanaian journalist and diplomat. He is currently the Chairman of the National Media Commission of Ghana, a constitutional body charged with promoting a free and responsible press in his country.

== Early life ==
Kabral was born at Ekwe, a village in the Western Region (Ghana). At age 28, he became the director of the Ghana Institute of Journalism.

== Education ==
Kabral attended St. Augustine's College (Cape Coast). He is an alumnus of the University of Ghana, Legon, the London School of Economics and is a Nieman Fellow of Harvard University. He was awarded an honorary doctorate degree in civil law by the University of Sierra Leone in 2007

== Career ==
He previously served as Ghana's High Commissioner to Sierra Leone (2001-2005) and Ambassador to Côte d'Ivoire (2006-2009). He was replaced by Mokowa Blay Adu-Gyamfi as the High Commissioner of Ghana to Sierra Leone. He worked as a journalist for 25 years before his transition to the world of diplomacy. During this period, he edited a number of publications in Ghana and was publisher/editor at The Independent, established in 1989. He also contributed to several international publications. He was at one time general secretary and president of the Ghana Journalists Association, president of the West African Journalists Association and executive member of both the Commonwealth Journalists Association and the International Federation of Journalists. A former director of the Ghana Institute of Journalism and part-time lecturer at Fourah Bay College, Sierra Leone.
