= William Ampem-Darko =

Ghanaian politician and broadcast executive

William Ampem Darko

13th Director-General of the GBC
- In office 2007–2010
- Nominated by: National Media Commission
- President: John Kufuor
- Preceded by: Yaw Owusu Addo (acting)
- Succeeded by: Kwabena Sarpong-Anane (acting)

Personal details
- Occupation: General manager & Director-General of the GBC (2007–2010); Public Servant; Politician

William Ampem Darko is a Ghanaian politician and civil servant. He was the Director General of the Ghana Broadcasting Corporation from 2007 to 2010.

Prior to joining the Ghana Broadcasting Corporation, he was the chairman of the New Patriotic Party's Eastern Region Finance Committee. In 2004, he unsuccessfully stood for the Kade seat during the parliamentary primaries. He lost to Ofosu Asamoah.
