= Eva Lokko =

Ghanaian Engineer and Television Executive

12th Director-General of the GBC
- In office August 2002 – November 2005
- Nominated by: National Media Commission
- President: John Kufuor
- Preceded by: Seth Ago-Adjetey
- Succeeded by: Yaw Owusu Addo (acting)

Personal details
- Born: Eva Naa Merley Lokko
- Died: 6 October 2016 (aged 64)
- Party: Progressive People's Party
- Spouse: Nii K. Bentsi-Enchill
- Children: 2
- Education: Wesley Girls' High School
- Occupation: Civil Servant; Politician
- Profession: Engineer

Eva Naa Merley Lokko (died 6 October 2016) was a Ghanaian civil servant, engineer and politician. She was the first woman to be chosen as the vice-presidential candidate of the Progressive People's Party (PPP).

She partnered the flagbearer of the PPP, Paa Kwesi Nduom in the 2012 presidential and parliamentary elections. She was also the first female Director General of the Ghana Broadcasting Corporation.

== Early life and education ==
Lokko was from a Ga-Adangbe ethnic group. Lokko attended Wesley Girls' High School in Cape Coast, where she was a student athlete and sports captain who competed and won trophies in hurdles, javelin 100-metres, relays and high jump. She was an engineer by profession and held master's degree in Satellite Communications Engineering from the then Soviet Union (USSR) and a master's degree in Intelligent Management Systems, System Analysis and Design from the United Kingdom.

== Working life ==
Lokko was the first satellite communications engineer and the first woman engineer to be employed at the Ghana Broadcasting Corporation (GBC) in 1972. She was part of the engineering team that installed and maintained Ghana's first colour television infrastructure in 1985.

She worked in more than forty countries across the world in various capacities. She served as regional programmes coordinator of the United Nations Development Programme initiative for Internet development in Africa. She also served with the United Nations for thirteen years and as chair of the UN Federation of International Civil Servants Association and the United Nations Staff Council and as a member of the UNDP News Advisory Board.

In 2002, she was appointed Director-General of the GBC, becoming the first and only woman to hold that position since the corporation was established in 1953. She worked in that role until 2005 when she was replaced by Yaw Owusu Addo.

Lokko was also the chief executive officer of Totally Youth, a non-governmental organization (NGO) based in Accra, Ghana.

She was a member of the Regent University College of Science and Technology council, and after her death the university honored her memory by instituting a scholarship scheme "Eva Lokko Scholarship" for highly capable but needy female students.

== Political career ==
=== Vice presidential bid ===
She was a member of the Progressive People's Party. In the lead up to the 2012 Ghanaian presidential election, she was chosen by the founder and flagbearer of the Progressive People's Party, Paa Kwesi Nduom as his running mate, making her the first woman to be selected as a vice presidential candidate for the party. At the end of the elections the incumbent president, John Dramani Mahama of the National Democratic Congress emerged winner with 5,574,761 votes whilst the PPP placed third with 64,362 votes.

=== Member of parliament bid ===
Ahead of the 2016 elections, Lokko had declared her intention to stand for the parliamentary elections for Klottey Korley Constituency on the ticket of the PPP. Until her death she was billed to compete in a tough contest against Zanetor Agyeman-Rawlings of the National Democratic Congress (NDC), daughter of Jerry Rawlings, and Philip Addison of the New Patriotic Party (NPP). The election was subsequently won by Zanetor Agyeman-Rawlings.

== Religious life ==
Eva Lokko was a Christian and a member of the Methodist Church of Ghana. She was a member of the highest decision-making bodies of the church—Conference and Synod. She was also the chairperson of the Youth Advisory Board and served on other committees of the church in various capacities. She also served as the church's National ICT consultant.

== Personal life ==
Lokko hailed from the Greater Accra Region of Ghana and was fluent in several local and international languages. She spoke Ga, Twi, English, Russian and French. She was married to Nii K. Bentsi-Enchill and together they had two children.

== Death and burial ==
She died on 6 October 2016 at the age of 64, in the United States of America, where she was receiving treatment after a short battle with ill-health. She was buried on 18 November 2016 at the Osu cemetery after a memorial service was held at the forecourt of the State House. The service was attended by notable politicians and civil servants including the flagbearer of PPP, Paa Kwesi Nduom and his running mate Brigitte Dzogbenuku, Naana Jane Opoku Agyeman the then Minister of Education, Stephen Adei a former rector of the GIMPA and her contenders for the Klottey Korle constituency, Zanetor Agyeman-Rawlings of the NDC, daughter of former president Rawlings and Phillip Addison of the NPP.
