= Albert Don-Chebe =

Ghanaian soldier, academic, lawyer and broadcasting executive

15th Director-General of the GBC
- In office 2013–2016
- President: John Mahama
- Preceded by: Berifi Afari Apenteng
- Succeeded by: Kwame Akuffo Anoff-Ntow

Personal details
- Education: St. Augustine's College; Tamale Senior High School
- Alma mater: University of Ghana; University of Manchester; Defense Information School; Ghana School of Law
- Occupation: General Manager & Director-General of the GBC (2013–2016); Public Servant
- Profession: Soldier; Lawyer

Albert Don-Chebe is a Ghanaian lawyer, retired soldier, and public servant. He was the Director General of the Ghana Broadcasting Corporation from 2013 to 2016.

== Education ==
Don-Chebe had his secondary education at St. Augustine's College, Cape Coast, and Tamale Senior High School for his Ordinary Level (O-Level) Certificate and his Advanced Level Certificate (A-Level) respectively. He continued at the University of Ghana where he obtained his bachelor's degree, and the University of Manchester where he was awarded his master's degree in English. He holds a Postgraduate Diploma in Public Affairs from the Defense Information School, and a Barrister-at-law certificate from the Ghana School of Law. He was called to the Bar in 2003.

== Career ==
Don-Chebe worked as a lecturer in English language at the University of Ghana. For 15 years, he had worked at the Directorate of Public Relations of the Ghana Armed Forces. Prior to his voluntary retirement from the Ghana Armed Forces in 1999, he had been involved in five peace-keeping operations under the supervision of the United Nations. He began as a Lieutenant and retired as a Major. Following his retirement from the Ghana Armed Forces, he joined the Ghana Breweries Limited as the Corporate Affairs Manager. In 2005, he was employed by the Ministry of Public Sector Reforms as a Communications Consultant. He was later appointed Head of Corporate Communication and Customer Care at Ghana Telecom (which later became Vodafone Ghana). Don-Chebe gained employment at the Millennium Development Authority in 2009 as the Director of Community and Public Outreach. Prior to his appointment as the Director General of the Ghana Broadcasting Corporation, he was the Director of Corporate Planning and Communication at the Export Development and Agricultural Investment Fund (EDAIF). He is a member of the Institute of Public Relations and once served as its president.

Don-Chebe was appointed Director General of the Ghana Broadcasting Corporation on 14 May 2013 by the National Media Commission. His three-year contract ended on 16 May 2016. He however proceeded on his accumulated leave in February 2016, and refused to return to the Ghana Broadcasting Corporation due to worker agitations at the corporation. He was succeeded by Kwame Akuffo Annof-Ntow. While serving as Director General of the Ghana Broadcasting Corporation, he was elected president of the African Union of Broadcasting. He is the chairman of the Northern Development Forum.

== Personal life ==
Don-Chebe is married with children.
