= Lebrecht James Chinery-Hesse =

Ghanaian lawyer (1930–2018)

Lebrecht James Chinery-Hesse GM
- Born: Lebrecht James Nii Tettey Chinery-Hesse; 19 October 1930; Jamestown, Accra, Gold Coast
- Died: 30 August 2018 (aged 87); Accra, Ghana
- Education: Accra Academy; Adisadel College; University of Hull; Inner Temple
- Occupations: Lawyer; Civil Servant; Diplomat
- Spouse: Mary Chinery-Hesse
- Children: Annabelle Busia; Herman; Naa Bortei-Doku; Mary-Maude
- Relatives: Hesse family; Robert Samuel Blay (father-in-law)

Lebrecht James Nii Tettey Chinery-Hesse, GM (19 October 1930 – 30 August 2018) was a Ghanaian lawyer and civil servant. He served as a specialist in legislative drafting in the service of Uganda, Ghana, Zambia and Sierra Leone. He is a former Solicitor-General of Ghana and once Acting Attorney General of Ghana.

== Early life and education ==
L.J. Chinery-Hesse was born on 19 October 1930 in Jamestown, Accra. His father was Herman Wilhelm Hesse and his mother was Emily Naa Chinery. He was the first of their nine children.

He had his early education at the Government Junior Boys’ School in Accra and the Osu Salem Presbyterian Boarding School. He was further educated at the Accra Academy and Adisadel College. In 1950, he proceeded to the United Kingdom for his tertiary education. He studied Classics initially at the University of Hull. Although he obtained the best prize in Classics, he decided to switch his academic interest to law. He enrolled at the Inner Temple and passed his law examination in 1956.

== Career ==
Chinery-Hesse was called to the English Bar at the Inner Temple in 1956. On his return to Ghana in the year of Ghana's independence in 1957, he became a private legal practitioner for a year. In 1959, he entered the Ghanaian public service as an assistant state attorney and rose to become a principal state attorney in 1964. Thereafter, in 1966, he was made chief parliamentary draftsman in Ghana. In 1969, Nicholas Yaw Boafo Adade was appointed the Attorney-General, and Chinery-Hesse was made to combine his role as chief parliamentary draftsman with an appointment to act as Solicitor-General. In 1972, he became a member of the Ghana Council for Law Reporting. In 1979, he was the acting Attorney General of the Republic of Ghana. Chinery-Hesse left office as chief parliamentary draftsman at the Attorney General's department in 1982.

In 1982, Chinery-Hesse left Ghana for Sierra Leone where he served as a First Parliamentary Counsel until 1987. He spent the next three years in legal draftsmanship roles in Zambia. From 1989 to 2014, he worked as an expert in legislative drafting in the Ministry of Justice in Kampala, Uganda.

Chinery-Hesse was a member of the Committee of Experts under the chairmanship of Nana S. K. B Asante that did work towards the 1992 Constitution of Ghana between June 1991 and July 1991.

== Personal life ==
He married Mary Chinery-Hesse (née Blay), a Ghanaian diplomat and international civil servant and the first woman chancellor of the University of Ghana. She is the daughter of Robert Samuel Blay (1901–1979), a barrister, jurist and a Justice of the Supreme Court of Ghana during the First Republic. They had a son, Herman Chinery-Hesse (1963–2024), who was a technology entrepreneur.

== Death and funeral ==
He died on 30 August 2018 and was buried in Accra, Ghana after his funeral service at the Accra Ridge Church. A separate memorial service was held at All Saints Cathedral in Nakasero, Uganda on 14 September 2018 in remembrance of him. He belonged to the Ghana Club and the Accra and Kampala chapters of the Rotary Club. His hobbies were reading, golf, swimming and table tennis.
