= Herman Chinery-Hesse =

Ghanaian software businessman (1963–2024)

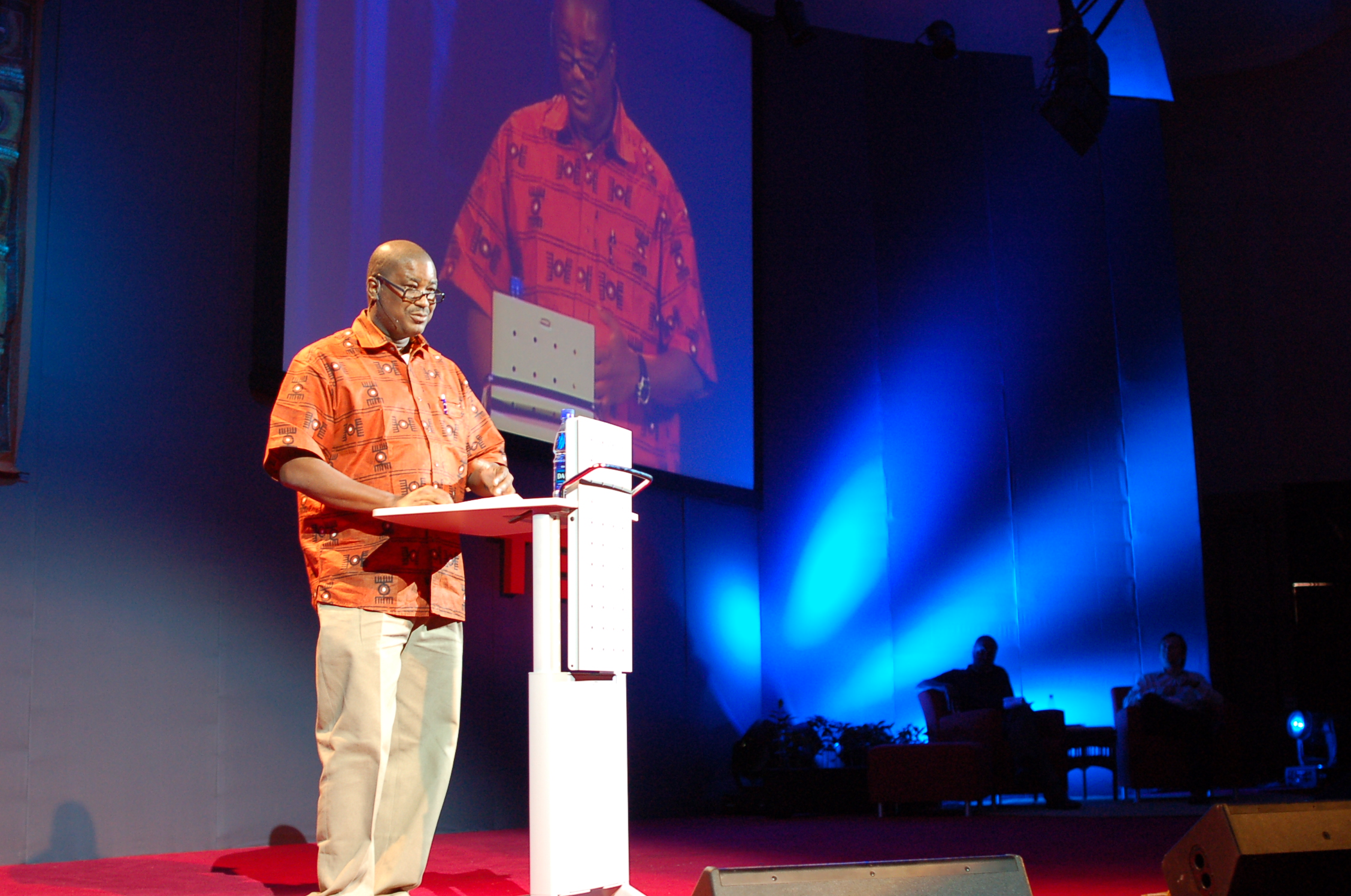
- Born: 18 November 1963; Dublin, Ireland
- Died: 17 September 2024 (aged 60); Accra, Ghana
- Citizenship: Ghanaian
- Education: Mfantsipim School; Westlake High School; Texas State University
- Occupations: Founder and Chairman of theSOFTtribe
- Spouse: Sadia Chinery-Hesse
- Children: 2
- Parents: Lebrecht James Chinery-Hesse (father); Mary Chinery-Hesse (mother)
- Relatives: Hesse family; Clerk family; Robert Samuel Blay (grandfather)

Herman Eamon Owula Kojo Chinery-Hesse (18 November 1963 – 17 September 2024) was a Ghanaian technology businessman and the founder of theSOFTtribe, the oldest and largest software company in Ghana. He was popularly known as "the Bill Gates of Africa". Chinery-Hesse also made the list of 15 Black STEM Innovators. In March 2019, he was introduced as the Commonwealth Chair for Business and Technology Initiatives for Africa.

== Biography ==
Chinery-Hesse was born in Dublin, Ireland on 18 November 1963 to Lebrecht James Nii Tettey Chinery-Hesse and Mary Chinery-Hesse, née Blay. His maternal grandfather was Robert Samuel Blay, a judge of the Supreme Court of Ghana in the First Republic.

He was educated at the Ridge Church School in Accra and Mfantsipim School in Cape Coast, Westlake High School in Austin, Texas and Texas State University, from which he graduated with a Bachelor of Science Degree in Industrial Technology.

In 1991 Chinery-Hesse co-founded theSOFTtribe, an African software house.

Chinery-Hesse was married to lawyer, Sadia Chinery-Hesse (née Clarke) and they had two children.

== Death ==
He died on 17 September 2024, at the age of 60, after reportedly suffering a cardiac arrest. He was buried at the Graceland Memorial Garden, in Berekuso, located at the foothills of the Aburi ridge, near Accra.

== Recognition ==
Chinery-Hesse and his company have won the Ghana Millennium Excellence Award for IT, He also won the Distinguished Alumnus Award from Texas State University, the first African recipient of the award.

He was also named the Microsoft African Partner of the Year.

Chinery-Hesse was a TED speaker

He was named one of "20 Notable Black Innovators in Technology", one of Africa's "Top 20 Tech Influencers", among the 2Top 100 Most Influential Africans of our Time", and one of the "Top 100 Global Thinkers" by Foreign Policy Magazine.
