= Henry Harding (actor) =

Ghanaian Actor

- Other name: Papa Nii
- Citizenship: Ghanaian
- Education: St. Martins preparatory, Bagabaga Middle School, Ofori Panyin, St. Johns
- Occupation: Actor
- Known for: Taxi Driver, The Arthurs, The adoteys Dada boat, Multi Kolour

Henry Harding also known as Pattington Papa Nii Papafio or Oesophagus is a Ghanaian film actor. He is best known for the role he played in the Taxi Driver TV series using a large vocabulary.

== Education ==
He started his basic education at St. Martins Preparatory, Mamprobi in Accra. He continued to Bagabaga Middle School in Tamale and then did his O'Level at Ofori Panyin in the Eastern Region and before doing his A-Levels at St. Johns in Sekondi.

== Career ==
During his acting career he was also a broadcaster at GBC doing sports beats and also has worked with Happy Fm (Ghana) and ETV Ghana doing sports. He was ordained as a pastor at the Lifted Yoke Chapel at Korle Gonno.

== Filmography ==
List of movies:

- Taxi Driver
- Adults in Education
- Dada Boat
- Hotel St. James
- Home Sweet Home
- The Arthurs
- The Adoteys
- Multi Kolour
