= Kofi Adoma Nwanwani =

Ghanaian journalist

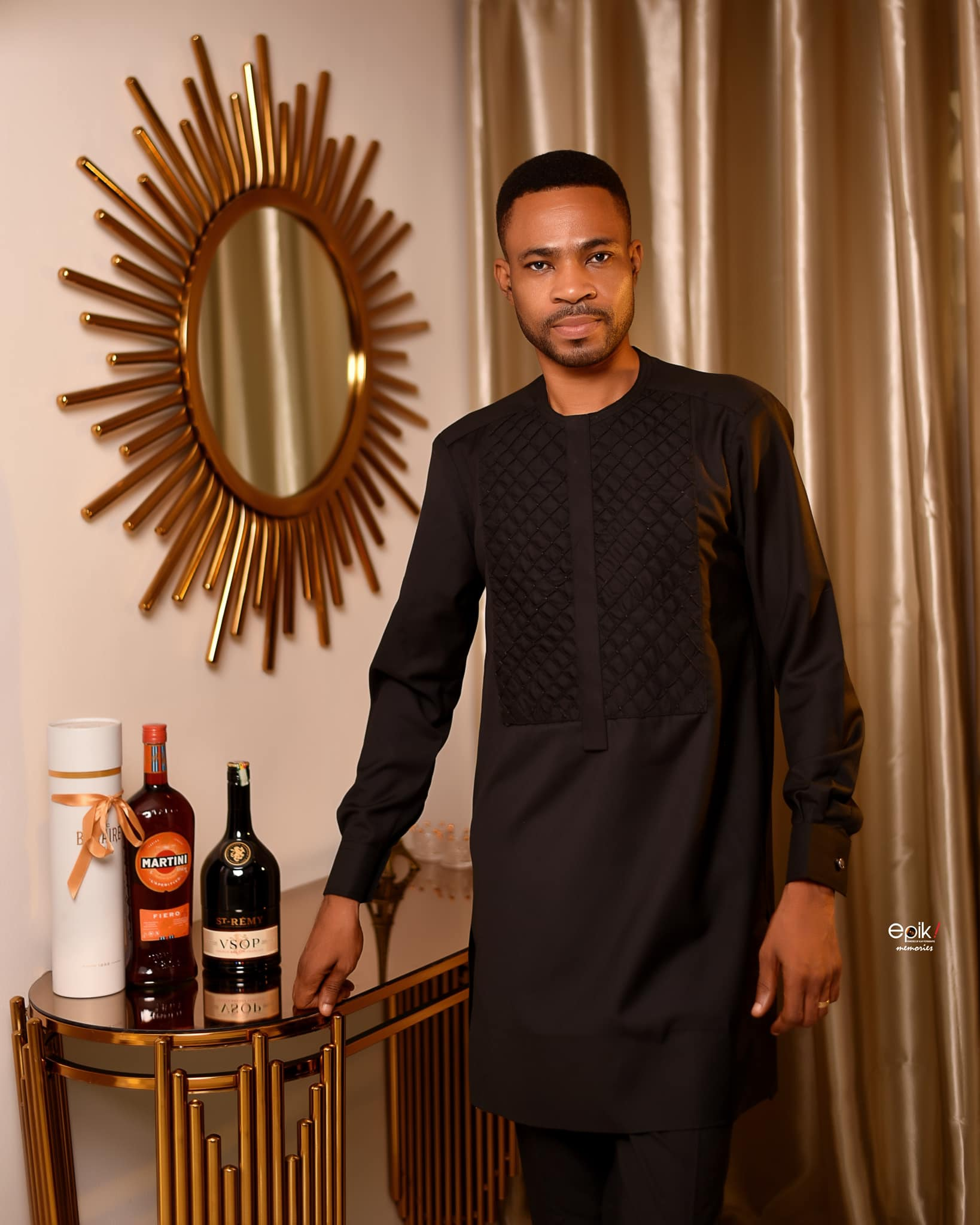
- Born: Stephen Kofi Adoma; 20 July; Berekum
- Occupation: Journalist
- Organization(s): CEO, KOFI TV
- Television: ABN Ghana
- Spouse: Miracle Adoma (M. 2004-Date)
- Website: www.kofitvinternational.com

Stephen Kofi Adoma known professionally as Kofi Adoma Nwanwani (born July 20) is a Ghanaian journalist, teacher and philanthropist. He currently works as the director of news for the Angel Broadcasting Network (ABN). He is the founder and CEO of Kofi TV. He was born in Berekum, a suburb of Bono Region of Ghana. In 2004, He married Miracle Adoma.

He was shot in the eye and sustained several injures by unknown gunmen in January 2025.

== Early life ==
Nwanwani was born and raised in Berekum in the Bono region of Ghana

== Career ==
Kofi started his career as a trained teacher in Ghana. After few years of teaching he developed interest in journalism of which he started his first radio hosting at Shalom Radio in Berekum, through Volta Star Radio (GBC Ho), Fox FM in Kumasi then to Hot FM in Accra.

He later joined Adom FM and Adom TV of the Multimedia Group Limited as the lead news anchor of their 6pm evening news. In his 10 years experience with Multimedia Group Limited he served as the host of Pampaso, editor and producer of Adom Kasee and a standby host of Dwaso Nsem. While working with Multimedia Group, he started his own network called Kofi TV, a YouTube channel he uses to interview politicians, pastors and celebrities.

In 2020, he joined Angel FM after two years of parting ways with Adom FM. He is currently the lead news anchor and morning show host at Angel FM/TV.
