= Amin Alhassan =

Ghanaian lawyer and broadcasting executive

17th Director-General of the GBC
- Incumbent
- Assumed office 2019
- Nominated by: National Media Commission
- President: Nana Akufo-Addo
- Preceded by: Kwame Akuffo Anoff-Ntow

Personal details
- Education: Navrongo Senior High School; Tamale Senior High School
- Alma mater: Ghana Institute of Journalism; Concordia University; University of Tampere
- Occupation: General Manager & Director-General of the GBC (2018–); Public Servant; Lawyer

Amin Alhassan is a Ghanaian academic, journalist and public servant. He is the incumbent and seventeenth Director General of the Ghana Broadcasting Corporation. He succeeded Kwame Akuffo Anoff-Ntow on the role on 1 October 2019.

== Early life and education ==
Alhassan was born and raised in Tamale even though his parents hail from Savelugu.

He had his early education at the Tishigu Anglican Primary School, and later the Tishigu Anglican Middle School in Tishigu, a suburb of Tamale. He had his secondary education at Navrongo Senior High School for his Ordinary Level Certificate (O-Level), and Tamale Senior High School for his Advanced Level Certificate (A-Level). He then proceeded to the Ghana Institute of Journalism for his tertiary education. He obtained his post graduate degrees from Concordia University and the University of Tampere.

== Career ==
After graduating from the Ghana Institute of Journalism, Alhassan joined the Ghana Broadcasting Corporation's GBC Radio News, and the Ghana News Agency. Following his postgraduate studies, he began as a lecturer at McGill University in 2003. In 2004 he joined York University in Toronto as an associate professor at the department of Communication Studies. He later joined the University for Development Studies in 2012, and became the founding dean of the Faculty of Agribusiness and Communication Sciences. He served as the Principal for the Wa campus in 2018, and in October 2019 he was appointed Director General of the Ghana Broadcasting Corporation.

== Honours ==
In 2021 he was awarded the Most People Focused CEO award during the Human Resource Excellence Awards.
