= David Ampofo =

Ghanaian journalist, communications expert and social entrepreneur

David Ampofo (born 14 June 1961) is a Ghanaian journalist, broadcaster, communications expert and author. He is the founder of Channel Two Communications.

== Early life and education ==
Ampofo was born at Takoradi in the Western Region of Ghana. He attended the Takoradi International School. In 1972, on completion of his Common Entrance exam, he began his secondary school education at St. John's School, Sekondi run by the Brothers of the Holy Cross from the USA. In 1982, he won a Ghana Government scholarship to pursue his university education in Cuba at the elite political leadership school Escuela Nico Lopez.

In 1990 he won the Flagship Britannia Award to pursue a Masters degree in journalism at the University of Wales.

== Career ==
Ampofo began his journalism career at the Ghana Broadcasting Corporation in 1986. In 1987 he was named Best Television Reporter and in 1988 he was named Ghanaian Journalist of the Year, for which he visited the UK as a guest of the Foreign Office. Whilst in the UK he also interned with The Observer and public affairs firms Hill and Knowlton and Walter Judds. Between 1987 and 1992, he was the host of Searchlight, a prime-time news and current affairs programme, and had many interviews with several world leaders, including Nelson Mandela, Yasser Arafat, Kenneth Kaunda and Sam Nujoma. He was a Presidential Correspondent and travelled extensively with Jerry Rawlings.

He was a correspondent for CNN's World Report and in 1990 the Columbia Journalism Review did a piece on outstanding foreign correspondents in which Ampofo was named. In 1991, he spent three months as an intern with CBS News in New York City.

Ampofo left the Ghana Broadcasting Corporation in 1992 and founded Channel Two Communications, a public relations consultancy. He launched the television show Time with David in 1995 and has conducted over 500 television interviews. He is a filmmaker and has produced over 200 promotional documentaries and investigative reports. He has also served as Public Affairs Counsel for notable organizations and personalities including former CEO of Ashanti Goldfields, Sam Jonah and Dr Papa Kwesi Nduom, a leading Ghanaian entrepreneur and Presidential candidate.

The editorial pieces produced by Channel Two Communications are as follows:

- Time with David - talk show. Created in 1995, it is a series of interviews with politicians, influential businessmen and leading thinkers.
- Special Report - a series of documentaries aimed at providing insight into the social challenges that Ghanaians confront.
- Business Report - a series of documentaries that showcase the different challenges facing the business sector and provide insight into Ghana's business climate.

In 1995 he was selected as Africa correspondent for M-Net's actuality programme Carte Blanche.

Ampofo currently serves as the chief executive officer of the Ghana Upstream Petroleum Chamber, where he leads the strategic direction of the country’s upstream oil and gas industry and serves as a bridge between industry operators, government, regulators, and the public.

== Family ==
Ampofo is one of eight siblings. His father, Thomas Edward Ampofo, worked with the Forestry Department and retired as the Chief Inspector of Timber. Ampofo is married to Sylvia Dadzie and they have three children. He also has two older children from his first marriage.
