= Samuel Johnfiah =

Ghanaian politician

MP for Ahanta West
- In office 7 January 2009 – 6 January 2013
- President: John Evans Atta Mills
- Preceded by: Samuel Kwofie
- Succeeded by: George Kwame Aboagye

Personal details
- Born: 9 September 1952 (age 74)
- Party: New Patriotic Party
- Education: University of Ghana, GIMPA
- Occupation: Politician
- Profession: Bank manager

Samuel Johnfiah (born 9 September 1952) is a Ghanaian politician who served as a member of parliament for the Ahanta West constituency in the 5th parliament of the 4th republic of Ghana.

== Early life and education ==
He was born on 9 September 1952. He hails from Hotopo in the Western Region of Ghana. He obtained his National Diploma in General Agriculture from University of Ghana in 1984. He also had his Executive Masters in Governance & Leadership (EMGL) from Ghana Institute Management and Public Administration in 2008.

== Career ==
Before becoming a parliamentarian, he was the Deputy general manager for Ahantaman Rural Bank.

== Politics ==
His political career begun in 2001 after he emerged winner of the 2000 Ghanaian General Elections and was sworn in on 7 January 2001. He served as the member of parliament representing the Ahanta West constituency in the 5th parliament of the 4th republic of Ghana.

He was elected in the 2008 Ghanaian general elections with 20,871 votes out of the 38,798 total valid votes cast, equivalent to 53.8%. He was elected over Joseph Jones Amoah of the National Democratic Congress, Comfort Amoo of the Democratic Freedom Party and David Oscar Yawson of the Convention People's Party. These obtained 24.21%, 4.61% and 17.38% respectively of total valid votes cast.

He lost the seat in 2012 Ghanaian general election for George Kwame Aboagye from National Democratic Congress. He is a member of the New Patriotic Party.

In the year 2000, Johnfiah won the general elections as the member of parliament for the Ahanta West constituency of the Western Region of Ghana. He won on the ticket of the New Patriotic Party. His constituency was a part of the 9 parliamentary seats out of 19 seats won by the New Patriotic Party in that election for the Western Region of Ghana. The New Patriotic Party won a majority total of 99 parliamentary seats out of 200 seats.

He was elected with 16,478 total valid votes cast. This was equivalent to 60.90% of the total valid votes cast. He was elected over William Cudjoe S. Kingsford of the National Democratic Congress, Joseph A. Eddie Mensah of the Convention People's Party, Joseph Kweku Arthur of the People's National Convention, Eva Parker of the National Reformed Party and Joseph Jones Amoah of the United Ghana Movement. These won 8,107, 1,358, 509, 416 and 170 votes out of the total valid votes cast respectively. These were equivalent to 30.00%, 5.00%, 1.90%, 1.50% and 0.06% respectively of total valid votes cast.

== Personal life ==
Johnfiah is married with six children. He is a Christian and a member of the Methodist Church.
