= Berifi Afari Apenteng =

Ghanaian lawyer and broadcasting executive

14th Director-General of the GBC
- In office 2011–2013
- Nominated by: National Media Commission
- President: John Atta Mills (2011–2012); John Mahama (2012–2013)
- Preceded by: Kwabena Sarpong-Anane (acting)
- Succeeded by: Albert Don-Chebe

Personal details
- Education: Mfantsipim School; Labone Senior High School
- Alma mater: University of Ghana; Ghana School of Law
- Occupation: General Manager & Director-General of the GBC (2011–2013); Public Servant; Lawyer

Berifi Afari Apenteng is a Ghanaian lawyer, journalist, and civil servant. He was the Director General of the Ghana Broadcasting Corporation from 2011 to 2013.

== Education ==
Apenteng had his secondary education at Mfantsipim School and Labone Senior High School. He then proceeded to the University of Ghana to study Modern History and Archeology, earning his Bachelor of Arts degree (combined honours) in 1974. In 1976, he obtained a graduate diploma from the School of Journalism and Communications, University of Ghana. He later enrolled at the Ghana School of Law where he was called to the bar in 1981. Apenteng holds Executive MBA degree from the University of Ghana Business School, he was also a John S. Knight Journalism Fellow at Stanford University.

== Career ==
Apenteng joined the Ghana Broadcasting Corporation as a Senior Reporter for the Ghana Broadcasting Corporation Television News department in November 1976. He was later made an editor, and in 1981, he was appointed head of Television News, succeeding E. A. Dentu who had retired in May that year.

Prior to his appointment as the Director General of the Ghana Broadcasting Corporation, he had served as Director of Radio and Deputy Director of Television at the Ghana Broadcast Corporation. He was also General Manager of TV3 Network Limited, and Managing Director of the Graphic Communications Group Limited. He worked as the Managing Director of TV Africa on a part-time basis.

== Personal life ==
Apenteng is married with children.
