= Mavis Kuukua Bissue =

Ghanaian politician

Hon. Mavis Kuukua Bissue MP

Member of Parliament for Ahanta West
- Incumbent
- Assumed office 7 January 2025
- Preceded by: Ebenezer Kojo Kum

Personal details
- Party: National Democratic Congress

Mavis Kuukua Bissue is a Ghanaian politician who is a member of the National Democratic Congress (NDC). She is the member of parliament elect for the Ahanta West constituency. She is the first female Member of Parliament for Ahanta West constituency.

== Politics ==
In May 2023, she stood for the National Democratic Congress primaries for Ahanta West. She won the primaries accumulating 805 votes to win the contest ahead of Emmanuel Okumi Andoh with 668 votes.

In the 2024 General Elections, Bissue contested the Ahanta West constituency against Francis Eric Pobee, the candidate for the New Patriotic Party (NPP). She secured 28,227 votes (58.94%), narrowly defeating Francis Eric Pobee, who garnered 19,663 votes (41.06%).
