= Kelvinside Academy =

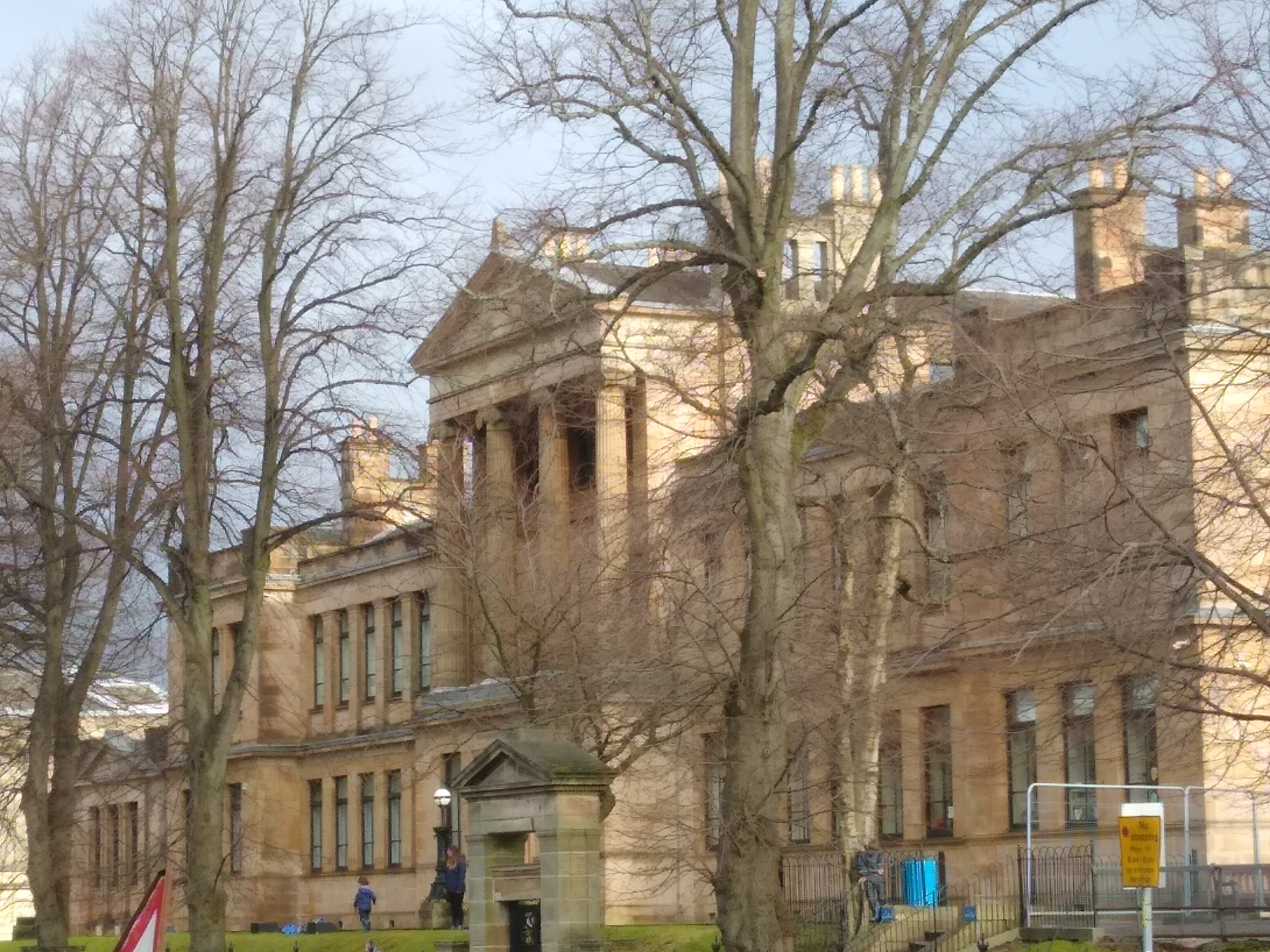

Location
- 33 Kirklee Road; Glasgow, G12 0SW; Scotland; 55.88293°N 4.29464°W

Information
- Type: Private day school
- Motto: Ever To Be The Best
- Religious affiliation: Non-denominational Christian
- Founded: 1878
- Rector: Dan Wyatt
- Deputy Rector: Lucy Hay
- Academic Deputy: Michael Smith
- Staff: 120
- Gender: Mixed
- Age: 3 to 18
- Enrolment: 640
- Colours: Navy Blue and Silver
- Mascot: Minerva
- Website: http://www.kelvinside.org/

Kelvinside Academy is a private day school in Glasgow, Scotland, founded in 1878. It has a capacity of over 600 pupils and spans two years of Nursery, six years of Junior School (primary school), a transition year of Senior Preparatory, and six years of Senior School (secondary school), comprising fifteen years in all. Kelvinside was founded as a private school and remained so until the late 1940s when, like many similar schools, it became 'grant-aided' until 1985 when it reverted to its fully independent roots once more. Formerly for boys only, the school became fully co-educational in 1998.

== The School ==
Kelvinside Academy is in the Kelvinside area of the north of Glasgow, near the Glasgow Botanic Gardens. It has a large main building, which is category A listed and was designed by James Sellars, with some modern additions. The original building was opened on 2 September 1878 and cost £21,698 11s; this included the construction of both roads and sewers.

The School crest shows Minerva with the motto ΑΙΕΝ ΑΡΙΣΤΕΥΕΙΝ which translates as "Ever To Be The Best". This has also been given a "modern" translation of "The Best You Can Be". Minerva appears prominently in carved stone above the main entrance, and in a bronze medallion set in the perimeter wall. Unlike many of the surrounding buildings, the School retains much of its original cast iron fences despite the metal shortages during the Second World War.

There is a well-established house system, which divides all the pupils into four different houses, each represented by a colour: red for Stewart House, yellow for Buchanan House, green for MacGregor House and blue for Colquhoun.

The School opened a new Nursery at its Balgray Campus in August 2013.

In 2018, Kelvinside merged with Craigholme School to form the Glasgow Schools Trust, which was created to share resources between both schools and preserve both schools due to falling pupil numbers.

== Notable alumni and staff ==
- John Joy Bell, journalist and author
- Robert Browning, Byzantinist
- Brigadier General John Charteris
- Sir Hugh Fraser, 2nd Baronet, of the House of Fraser department store chain (1936–1987)
- Richie Gray, Scottish International Rugby Union player currently playing for Glasgow Warriors
- Brigadier Alastair Pearson, Parachute Regiment, DSO***, MC
- Air Vice Marshal Sandy Johnstone
- James Broom Millar – first Director General of the Ghana Broadcasting Corporation (1954–1960)
- Boyd Muir, EVP & CFO, President of Operations, Universal Music Group
- Ian Livingston, Baron Livingston of Parkhead
- Sir George Macdonald, archaeologist, teacher at the school 1887–1892
- Sir Donald MacDougall, economist
- Donald Orr, cricketer
- Alan Rodger, Baron Rodger of Earlsferry (1944–2011)
- Craig Wright, cricketer.
- Sandy Wylie, Lord Kinclaven, Judge of the Supreme Courts
- Scott Cummings, Scottish International Rugby Union player currently playing for Glasgow Warriors
- Douglas Gairdner, paediatrician
- Rennie Keith, cricketer
- Colin Neill, Former President Cricket Scotland, Current Chairman of The Forty Club
- Craig Whyte, former owner of Rangers FC

== Related publications ==
- Kelvinside Academy, 1878–1978 by Colin Mackay
- Kelvinside Academy, 1878–1923 by William Brodie
- Kelvinside Academy, 1878–1928 by David Morrice Low
- Minerva, termly newsletter

== Sources ==
- "James Sellars (1843–88), architect, a biography". glasgowsculpture.com.
- "King's College London – Library Services". kcl.ac.uk. Archived from the original on 21 November 2005.
- http://pmsa.courtauld.ac.uk/pmsa/GW/KS-002.htm
- "Kelvinside Academy | Glasgow | Glasgow, Scotland | G12 0SW". isbi.com. Archived from the original on 27 September 2007.
