= Virginia Hesse =

Ghanaian civil servant and diplomat

Ambassador of Ghana to the Czech Republic
- In office 2 August 2017 – 6 January 2021
- President: Nana Akuffo-Addo
- Preceded by: Zita Okaikoi
- Succeeded by: James Komla Nyasembi

Personal details
- Born: 31 July 1944 (age 82) Ghana
- Relations: Lebrecht Wilhelm Fifi Hesse (brother)
- Children: 1 daughter
- Education: Achimota School; University of Ghana, Legon
- Profession: Civil servant; Diplomat

Virginia Hesse (born 31 July 1944) is a Ghanaian civil servant and diplomat who served as Ghana's ambassador to the Czech Republic from 2017 to 2021. She spent a majority of her professional career in the Ghanaian public service.

== Family life and education ==
A native of Osu, Accra, Virginia Hesse is a member of the notable Hesse family. Her brother, Lebrecht Wilhelm Fifi Hesse (1934 – 2000) was the first black African Rhodes Scholar, two-time Director-General of the Ghana Broadcasting Corporation and a member of the Public Services Commission of Ghana. Her other brother, Christian Hesse served as Ghana's ambassador to the Soviet Union and later to Russia in the 1980s and 1990s. She is an alumna of Achimota School and the University of Ghana, Legon.

== Career ==
She worked at the Ministry of Trade and Industry in Accra, as a commercial officer and at the ministry's diplomacy department. She was Ghana's Deputy Trade Commissioner at the Court of St James's. In the private sector, she also worked for a Swiss international firm as a project manager and later, for water supply and sewage treatment plants. She was also the President of the Accra chapter of the women's empowerment global non-profit, Zonta International.

=== Diplomatic career ===
She was sworn into office as the Ghanaian Ambassador to the Czech Republic, together with four other envoys, on 2 August 2017 by Nana Akufo-Addo, the president of Ghana. She was also among 20 Ghanaian women ambassadors selected that year. As ambassador, she had concurrent accreditation to North Macedonia, Romania and other Visegrád Group nations, Hungary and Slovakia. She was also the Dean of the African Group of the Czech Republic. She finished her four-year term in 2021.

== Personal life ==
Virginia Hesse has one daughter, Gyankroma Akufo-Addo whose father is Nana Akufo-Addo. Hesse is a lifelong Presbyterian and a member of the Ebenezer Presbyterian Church, Osu.
