= Ebenezer Kojo Kum =

Ghanaian politician

Hon Ebenezer Kojo Kum
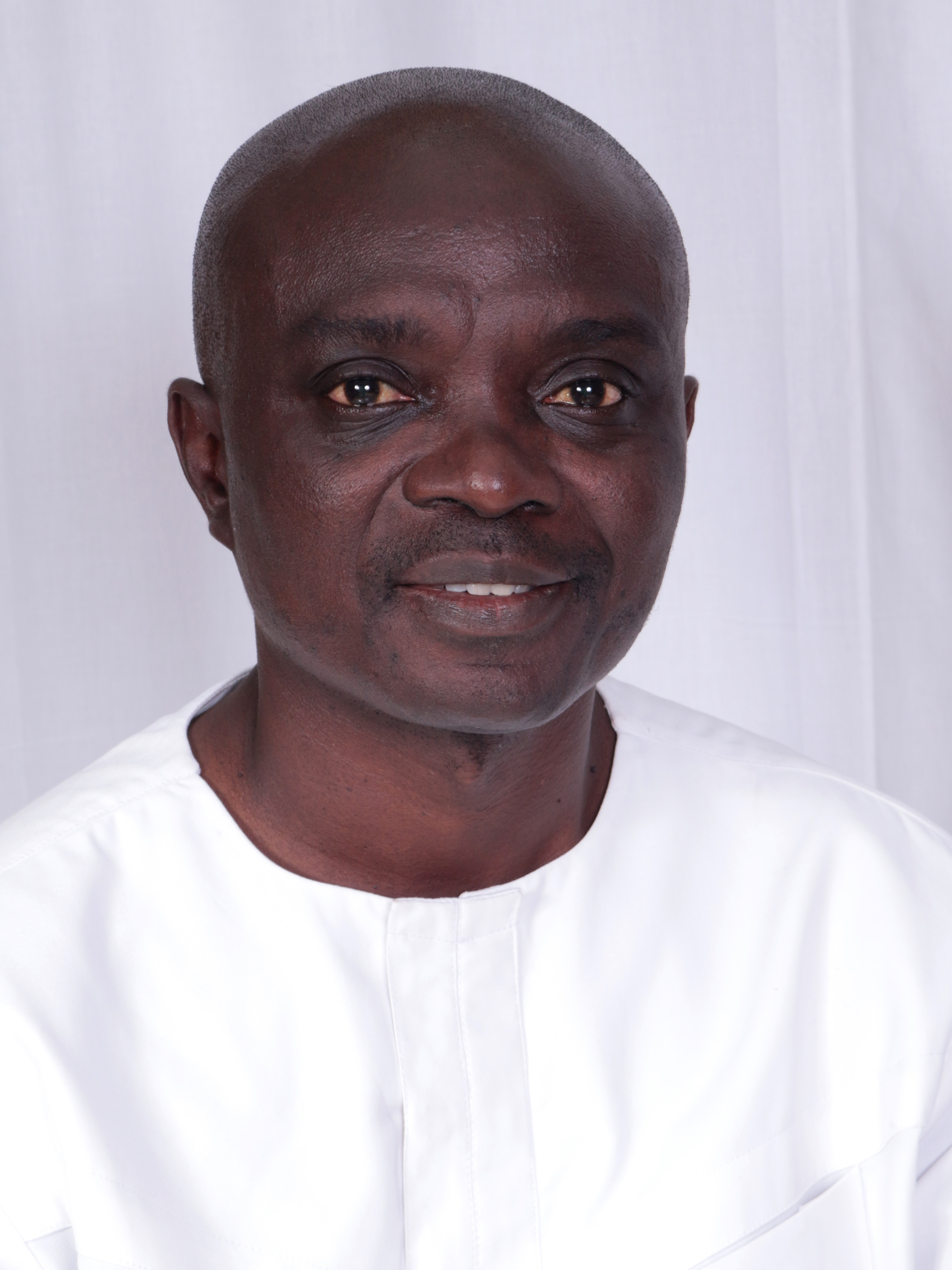

Member of the Ghana Parliament for Ahanta West
- Incumbent
- Assumed office 7 January 2017
- Succeeded by: Mavis Kuukua Bissue

Personal details
- Born: Ebenezer Kojo Kum; 17 April 1967 (age 59) Dixcove
- Party: New Patriotic Party
- Occupation: Politician
- Committees: Judiciary Committee, Trade, Industry and Tourism Committee

Ebenezer Kojo Kum (born Monday 17 April 1967) is a Ghanaian politician, a lawyer who was a member of the Seventh Parliament of the Fourth Republic of Ghana and currently a member of the Eighth Parliament of the Fourth Republic of Ghana representing the Ahanta West Constituency in the Western Region of Ghana on the ticket of the New Patriotic Party.

== Early life and education ==
Ebenezer Kojo Kum was born and hails from Dixcove in the Western Region of Ghana. Ebenezer Kojo Kum obtained his Ordinary Level(O - Level) in 1984 and Advanced Level(A - Level) in 1986. Ebenezer Kojo Kum proceeded to have his Bachelor of Arts(Hons) and Diploma in Education, all from the University of Cape Coast in 1991 and Barrister-at-Law (General Practice) at Ghana School of Law in the year 2020.

== Career ==
Ebenezer Kojo Kum was the Deputy Director/Principal Cultural Officer/Senior Cultural Officer from 1992 to 2005 at the Centre for National Culture.

Ebenezer Kojo Kum was also a junior lawyer from 2000 to 2002 at Kendicks Law Firm, an Associate partner from 2002 to 2007 as well as the General Manager from 2007 to 2016 at the Kendicks Law Firm.

Ebenezer Kojo Kum is now working as the Member of Parliament (MP) for Ahanta West Constituency in the Western Region of Ghana on the ticket of the New Patriotic Party.

== Political Life ==
Ebenezer Kojo Kum contested and won the 2016 NPP parliamentary primaries for Ahanta West Constituency in the Western Region of Ghana. Ebenezer Kojo Kum proceeded to win the parliamentary seat in his constituency (Ahanta West Constituency) in the Western Region of Ghana during the 2016 Ghanaian general elections on the ticket of the New Patriotic Party to join the Seventh (7th) Parliament of the Fourth Republic of Ghana with 30,596 votes (68.1%) against George Kwame Aboagye(Late) of the National Democratic Congress who had 13,784 votes (30.7%) and Isaac Kweku Annan of the Convention People's Party(CPP) who had 546 votes (1.2%).

Ebenezer Kojo Kum again contested and won the 2020 NPP parliamentary primaries for Ahanta West Constituency in the Western Region of Ghana with 472 votes(65.46%) against Kwesi Biney who had 249 votes (34.54%). Ebenezer Kojo Kum again proceeded to win in the 2020 Ghanaian general elections on the ticket of the New Patriotic Party to join the Eighth (8th) Parliament of the Fourth Republic of Ghana with 27,946 votes (51.60%) against Dr. Emmanuel Okumi Andoh (a former Pro-Vice Chancellor of the Takoradi Technical University) of the National Democratic Congress who had 23,957 votes (44.24%), Ismail Buadii of the Ghana Union Movement (GUM) who had 1,797 votes (3.32%), Ebo Mensah of the Convention People's Party (CPP) who had 214 votes (0.40%), Nathaniel Adusei of the All People's Congress (APC) who had 139 votes (0.25%) and Dominic Akalga of the People's National Convention (PNC) who also had 101 votes (0.18%).

Ebenezer Kojo Kum is the Minister of Chieftaincy and Religious Affairs.

=== Committees ===
Ebenezer Kojo Kum is a member of the Judiciary Committee . He is also a member of the Trade, Industry and Tourism Committee of the Eighth (8th) Parliament of the Fourth Republic of Ghana.

== Personal life ==
Ebenezer Kojo Kum is a Christian and a member of the Anaji Christ the King Methodist Church in Takoradi. Ebenezer Kojo Kum is happily married with a child.

== Philanthropy ==
Ebenezer Kojo Kum donated some medical equipments to the Ahanta West health directorate in the Ahanta West Constituencyon Friday, 24 January 2020. The equipment which worth thousands of cedis included two motorbikes, two motor tricycle (popularly known as Mahama Canbu), pieces of bed sheets, and a 55inches Samsung Television set were handed over to the Municipal Health Director, Madam Caroline Efah Otoo.

Ebenezer Kojo Kum presented Ten Thousand, Seven Hundred and Eighty Eight Ghana Cedis(10,788) to Sankor Senior High School in his constituency (Ahanta West Constituency) to purchase thirteen (13) marker boards with graph.

Ebenezer Kojo Kum again fulfilled a promise he made to the Christian Divine Church in Dixcove. He made a cash donation of GHS 5,400 in a visit to the church prior to the 2020 general election to support the work of the Lord. This was after the Head Pastor, Paul Essien prophesied a victory for him in the election.
