= Seth Ago-Adjetey =

Ghanaian accountant and broadcasting executive

11th Director-General of the GBC
- In office 2000–2002
- Nominated by: National Media Commission
- President: John Jerry Rawlings
- Preceded by: Gilbert Komla Adanusa (acting)
- Succeeded by: Eva Lokko

Personal details
- Education: University of Ghana; Leeds Beckett University
- Occupation: General Manager & Director-General of the GBC (2000–2002); Public Servant
- Profession: Accountant

Seth Ago-Adjetey is a Ghanaian accountant and civil servant. He was the Director General of the Ghana Broadcasting Corporation from 2000 to 2002.

== Early life and education ==
Ago-Adjetey was born on 4 April 1945. He studied Business Administration at the University of Ghana graduating in 1971. He holds an ACCA certificate which he obtained while studying at the School of Accountancy and Applied Economics, Leeds Polytechnic (now Leeds Beckett University).

== Career ==
Ago-Adjetey began as an Assistant Accounts Manager at the Ghana Industrial Holding Corporation from July 1971 to September 1971. He later joined the State Hotels Corporation from 1971 to 1974, where he worked as an assistant accountant and later accountant. In March 1978, Ago-Adjetey was a Cost Accountant at Metal Box Limited, a company located in Shipley-Bradford, UK.

Ago-Adjetey returned to the Ghana where he gained employment as a Cost Accountant at the Tema Food Complex Corporation in April 1978. He later became acting managing director of the company from 1983 to 1987. In 1989, he joined E. O. Mensah & Co (Chartered Accountants) as a Junior Partner. Prior to his appointment at the Ghana Broadcasting Corporation, he was a Managing Partner of the firm. Ago-Adjetey served as the Director General of the Ghana Broadcasting Corporation from 15 September 2000 until he was relieved of his duties in August 2002. It is alleged that his contract was terminated by the National Media Commission without an explanation. He was succeeded by Eva Lokko.

Ago-Adjetey has acted as a Bank of Ghana consultant for the World Bank Rural Banks Restructuring Programme, the USAID and also, the European Union Micro-projects. He has also served on various boards of several public organisations since 1972.
