= Donald Orr (cricketer) =

Scottish cricketer

Personal information
- Full name: Donald Anderson Orr
- Born: 11 June 1967 (age 59); Glasgow, Lanarkshire, Scotland
- Batting: Right-handed
- Role: Wicket-keeper

Domestic team information
- Years: Team
- 1992–1995: Scotland

Career statistics
Competition	First-class	List A
Matches	3	2
Runs scored	37	9
Batting average	37.00	4.50
100s/50s	–/–	–/–
Top score	23*	9
Catches/stumpings	3/3	–/–
- Source: Cricinfo, 29 June 2022

Donald Anderson Orr (born 11 June 1967) is a Scottish former cricketer.

Orr was born at Glasgow in June 1967 and was educated in the city at Kelvinside Academy. As a club cricketer, Orr initially played for Poloc Cricket Club, and later played for the West of Scotland Cricket Club and Clydesdale Cricket Club. It was while playing for Clydesdale that he was selected to play for Scotland in a first-class match against Ireland at Dundee in 1992. Orr made two further first-class appearances for Scotland against Ireland in 1994 and 1995. A wicket-keeper, Orr took three catches and stumpings apiece in his two matches, while as a batsman he scored 37 runs with a highest score of 23 not out. In addition to playing first-class cricket for Scotland, Orr also played two List A one-day matches; the first came in the 1993 Benson & Hedges Cup against Essex at Forfar, while the second came in the 1st round of the 1995 NatWest Trophy against Nottinghamshire at Trent Bridge. He continued to play minor matches for Scotland until 1998, the year in which he was selected for a 2-day match against the Marylebone Cricket Club at Lord's.
