= William Frank Kobina Coleman =

Ghanaian engineer and broadcasting executive (born 1922)

2nd Director-General of the GBC
- In office 1960–1970
- President: Kwame Nkrumah
- Preceded by: J. B. Millar
- Succeeded by: Stephen Bekoe Mfodwo

Personal details
- Born: William Frank Kobina Coleman; 21 March 1922 Kano, Kano State, Northern Region, Nigeria
- Education: Adisadel College; Igbobi C. M. S./Methodist Secondary School
- Alma mater: Achimota College; University of London; University of Southampton
- Occupation: General Manager & Director-General of the GBC (1960–1970)

William Frank Kobina Coleman (born 21 March 1922) was a Nigerian-born Ghanaian engineer. He was the first Ghanaian to serve as the Director General of the Ghana Broadcasting Corporation, he served in this capacity from 1960 to 1970.

== Early life and education ==
Coleman was born in Kano, the capital of Kano State, Nigeria (then Northern Nigeria) on 21 March 1922. His father was then a civil servant residing in Kano. He had his early education at the Holy Trinity School in Kano where he passed his third Standard in 1932. A year later, he left Kano for the Gold Coast, where he resumed his education at E. C. M. Senior School at Saltpond. He enrolled at Adisadel College, Cape Coast in 1936 but returned to Nigeria a year later to join his parents. Coleman gained admission at the Igbobi C. M. S./Methodist Secondary School where he graduated in 1940.

== Career ==
In 1941, Coleman gained employment at the Nigerian Railways but left for the Gold Coast after a year of service. He took up a teaching job in 1942 at St. Edward's Seminary, a school which was then located at Adabraka, a suburb of Accra. He later joined the Treasury as a second Decision Clerk prior to entering Achimota College to pursue an Intermediate bachelor's degree in engineering. Upon passing his External Degree Examinations, Coleman was attached to the Gold Coast Broadcasting Service (now the Ghana Broadcasting Corporation) for a brief period of time after which he joined the Achimota College teaching staff. In 1948, he won a scholarship to study a post graduate course in the United Kingdom. He studied at the University of Southampton (where he obtained a diploma in Electronics), the University of London (where he obtained his bachelor's degree in engineering), and also had an attachment course with the British Broadcasting Corporation, and Messrs Marconi, a radio company then in the United Kingdom. Coleman returned to the Gold Coast after his studies abroad to join the Gold Coast Broadcasting Service once again. He began as an engineer, and was later promoted to the post of a Deputy Chief Engineer in 1955. In 1958, he became the Chief Engineer and later the deputy director when the position was regraded. In August 1960, Coleman was appointed Director General of the Ghana Broadcasting Corporation, succeeding J. B. Millar. Coleman served in this capacity from 1960 to 1970. He was succeeded by Stephen Bekoe Mfodwo in August 1970. Coleman remains the longest serving Director General of the Ghana Broadcasting Corporation. He once served as the vice president of the Ghana Institution of Engineers.

== See also ==
- Ghana Broadcasting Corporation
