= Garden City Radio =

- Kumasi; Ghana
- Broadcast area: Ashanti Region
- Frequency: 92.1 MHz,

Programming
- Languages: English, Twi
- Format: Local news, talk and music

Ownership
- Owner: Ghana Broadcasting Corporation

History
- First air date: 1994

Garden City Radio is a public radio station in Kumasi, the capital town of the Ashanti Region of Ghana. The station is owned and run by the Ghana Broadcasting Corporation.
