= Kwame Karikari (journalist) =

Ghanaian academic, journalist, and broadcasting executive

6th Director-General of the GBC
- In office 1982–1984
- President: Jerry John Rawlings
- Preceded by: John Yaw Assasie
- Succeeded by: Lebrecht Wilhelm Fifi Hesse

Personal details
- Born: Kwame Karikari; 16 July 1945 (age 81) Akim-Awisa, Gold Coast
- Education: Komenda College of Education
- Alma mater: University of Education, Winneba; City College of New York; Columbia University
- Occupation: General Manager & Director-General of the GBC (1982–1984)

Kwame Karikari (born 16 July 1945) is a Ghanaian academic and journalist. He is a professor of Journalism and Mass Communication. He was the Director General of the Ghana Broadcasting Corporation from 1982 to 1984. He currently serves as Chairman of the Graphic Communications Group Limited.

== Biography ==
Karikari was born on 16 July 1945 at Akim-Awisa in the Eastern Region of Ghana. He studied at Komenda Training College where he graduated as a teacher.

After his studies at the training college, Karikari began teaching at the Wenchi Experimental Primary School, Ashanti-Akim. He later enrolled at the Advanced Teacher Training College in Winneba (now the University of Education, Winneba) for his diploma and taught at Navrongo Secondary School in 1970. In 1971, Karikari left for the United States to study at the City College of New York. He graduated from City College in 1975 with a bachelor of arts degree in philosophy and political science. He then proceeded to Columbia University, where, in 1976, he obtained a master's degree in journalism.

After his graduate studies, he worked with a number of newspapers until 1979 when he returned to Ghana to join the University of Ghana staff as a lecturer. At the University of Ghana, he taught at the School of Communication Studies from 1979 until 1982 when he was appointed acting and later substantive Director General of the Ghana Broadcasting Corporation. He served in this capacity from 1982 to 1984. After his stint at the Ghana Broadcasting Corporation, he returned to academia and taught at the University of Ghana where he attained professorship status, and served as Director for the School of Communication Studies. Kwame Karikari later joined the Wisconsin University in Ghana as Dean of Communications Studies.

As an activist of freedom of expression, social justice and democracy in Africa, Karikari served as the Executive Director of the Media Foundation for West Africa (MFWA), he has also served various boards and international organisations that champion human rights. He is also on the editorial board of academic publications. He is the Chairman of the Graphic Communications Group Limited.

== Publications ==
- The Paradox of Voice Without Accountability in Ghana, (2014)
