= James Broom Millar =

British broadcasting executive

1st Director-General of the GBC
- In office 1954–1969
- Monarch: Elizabeth II
- Prime Minister: Kwame Nkrumah (Prime Minister and head of Government Business)
- Governor: Charles Noble Arden-Clarke
- Preceded by: Position established
- Succeeded by: William Frank Kobina Coleman

Personal details
- Born: James Broom Millar; 1909 Baldernock, Stirling, Scotland
- Died: 19 August 1986 (aged 76–77)
- Education: Kelvinside Academy; Loretto School
- Alma mater: St. John's College, Cambridge
- Occupation: General Manager & Director-General of the GBC (1954–1957)

James Broom Millar OBE (1909–1986) was a British Foreign Service personnel, a World War II veteran, and Media executive. He was the Director General of the Gold Coast Broadcasting Service from 1954 to 1957 and the Director General of the Ghana Broadcasting Corporation from 1957 to 1960. He was consequently the first Director General of the Ghana Broadcasting Corporation.

== Early life and education ==
Millar was born in 1909 at Baldernock, Stirling. He was the first child of four children, and his father was an architect. He was educated at Kelvinside Academy, Loretto School, and St. John's College, Cambridge, for his tertiary education, where he studied economics under the tutelage of John Maynard Keynes. He graduated with his bachelor's degree in 1930.

== Career ==
Following his studies at Cambridge, Millar joined the staff of George Morton and Company (his grandfather's business in Glasgow). In 1938 he was employed by the British Foreign Office due to his knowledge in French and German. He was sent to Berlin in Germany, and later Zagreb in Croatia. There, he was made vice consul at the beginning of the second world war. When the Germans invaded Yugoslavia in 1941, Millar was made liaison officer to the Yugoslav partisans due to his knowledge of Germany. He was also made liaison officer in the Middle East and later in Bari, Italy. In Italy, Millar was responsible for training troops for parachute jumping and also improve relations with partisans. He stayed in Bari until 1945.

In 1946, Millar was employed by the British Broadcasting Corporation's Eastern European Service as a Programme Organiser, he later became an Assistant Head of the Service. He left for Yugoslavia in 1948 to study and understand the broadcasting needs of under-developed territories. The Colonial Office at the time was focused on improving broadcasting and a special post of Broadcasting Officer was created. Millar applied to be seconded in 1949, as he recalled, "I must say I never expected to get it". He however gained the appointment and became very keen on overseeing broadcasting schemes under Colonial Development and Welfare funds. He worked together with Tom Chalmers the then Director of Broadcasting in Nigeria upon secondment by the British Broadcasting Corporation.

Millar returned to the administrative side of the British Broadcasting Corporation as a Senior Administrative Assistant, External Broadcasting in 1951. When an opening came along for Director of the Gold Coast Broadcasting Service, he was seconded by the British Broadcasting Corporation to take up the position on 1 August 1954. Upon his secondment for the post, broadcasting had grown from under the wing of the Department of Information (which was then responsible for everything related to broadcasting in the Gold Coast) to become a department on its own. Millar served as the Director of the Gold Coast Broadcasting Service from 1954 until 1957 when the department was renamed the Ghana Broadcasting Corporation upon Ghana's independence. Millar then became the Director General of the Ghana Broadcasting Corporation from 1957 to 1960. He was succeeded by William Frank Kobina Coleman.

== Death ==
Millar died on 19 August 1986 in Bournmouth.

== See also ==
- Ghana Broadcasting Corporation
