= Gilbert Adanusa =

Ghanaian engineer and broadcasting executive

Gilbert Komla Adanusa

Director-General of the GBC
- Acting; 2000–1999
- President: John Jerry Rawlings
- Preceded by: Kofi Frimpong
- Succeeded by: Seth Ago-Adjetey

Personal details
- Occupation: General Manager & Director-General of the GBC (2000–1999); Public Servant
- Profession: Engineer

Gilbert Komla Adanusa is a Ghanaian engineer and civil servant. He was president of the Ghana Institution of Engineering from 1988 to 1989, and the acting Director General of the Ghana Broadcasting Corporation from 1999 to 2000.

Adanusa served as Director of Engineering of External Communications at the Ghana Post and Telecommunications (now divided into Ghana Post and Vodafone Ghana) from 1984 to 1992. In 1998 he became a member of the International Institute of Communications. Prior to his appointment as acting Director General of the Ghana Broadcasting Corporation, he was an advisor to the Ministry of Transport and Communications, and a member of the Ghana Broadcasting Corporation board.
