= Kwame Akuffo Anoff-Ntow =

Ghanaian academic, journalist and broadcasting executive

16th Director-General of the GBC
- In office 2016–2018
- President: John Mahama (November 2016-January 2017); Nana Akufo-Addo (January 2017-January 2018)
- Preceded by: Albert Don-Chebe
- Succeeded by: Amin Alhassan

Personal details
- Education: University of Calgary
- Occupation: General Manager & Director-General of the GBC (2016–2018); Public Servant
- Profession: Academic

Kwame Akuffo Anoff-Ntow is a Ghanaian journalist, academic and public servant. He was the 16th Director General of the Ghana Broadcasting Corporation from 2016 to 2018.

Anoff-Ntow was born in October 1964. He holds a doctorate degree (Doctor of Philosophy) in Communications Studies from the University of Calgary, Canada, where he used the Ghana Broadcasting Corporation as a case study for his thesis; "Public Broadcasting and the politics of media in Ghana: a case study of GBC". As an academic, his research interests are in the sphere of newsroom journalism, the politics and public broadcasting in Africa, communication policies and the politics involved in visual representation.

He is a member of the International Public Television (INPUT) forum, the Ghana Journalists Association, and the Canadian Communication Association. He also serves on the board of the African Centre for Parliamentary Affairs (ACEPA).
