= Obonu FM =

Tema; Ghana
- Broadcast area: Greater Accra Region
- Frequency: 96.5 MHz,

Programming
- Languages: Ga, English
- Format: Local news, talk and music

Ownership
- Owner: Ghana Broadcasting Corporation

Obonu FM is a public radio station in Tema, a town of the Greater Accra Region of Ghana. The station is owned and run by the state broadcaster - the Ghana Broadcasting Corporation.
