= Radio Savannah =

Tamale; Ghana
- Broadcast area: Northern
- Frequency: 91.2 MHz,

Programming
- Languages: English, Dagbanli, Gonja
- Format: Local news, talk and music

Ownership
- Owner: Ghana Broadcasting Corporation

Radio Savannah is a public radio station in Tamale, the capital town of the Northern region of Ghana. The station is owned and run by the state broadcaster - the Ghana Broadcasting Corporation. Programme content is mostly English, Dagbanli and Gonja
