= Ellis Owusu-Dabo =

Ghanaian academic and Pro Vice-Chancellor (born 2000)

- Born: 30 April 1968 (age 58); Kumasi, Ghana
- Education: KNUST (BSc. MB ChB, MSc.) University of Nottingham (PhD)
- Occupation: Public Health Expert

Ellis Owusu-Dabo is a Ghanaian academic and pro-vice-chancellor of the Kwame Nkrumah University of Science and Technology.

== Education ==
Owusu-Dabo attended the St. John's School, Sekondi, and then proceeded to St. Augustine's College (Cape Coast). He then had his BSc. human biology and MB ChB-medicine and surgery from the Kwame Nkrumah University of Science and Technology. He went on to obtain an MSc. in health services planning and management from the same institution. His admirable passion and commitment to academia and health motivated him further towards the acquisition of a PhD in epidemiology and public health from the University of Nottingham, UK.

== Career ==
As a professor of epidemiology and global health, his area of expertise is in medical epidemiology and applied public health technologies, and is a former director of the Kumasi Centre for Collaborative Research. His research interest is in mainly non-communicable diseases in low-income country settings and also has considerable interest in population genomics of pulmonary tuberculosis. Ellis has secured and managed multimillion United States dollar research grants from principal granting institutions such as the European Union, National Institutes of Health, World Bank Group, and the Bill & Melinda Gates Foundation as well as many bilateral organizations. He serves on several boards at both local and international levels. Owusu-Dabo has published over 200 research articles in peer-reviewed journals and is an international scholar at the Perelman School of Medicine at the University of Pennsylvania. He jointly developed patentable knowledge regarding the use of Granzyme B serum levels as biomarker to discriminate between sepsis and severe malaria (BNI009). He has been one of the leading voices on Ghana's Coronavirus fight in terms of advancing data-driven research on the subject. In September 2022, he was re-elected as the Pro Vice-chancellor.

== Awards ==
Owusu-Dabo has received awards from the Africa Network for Drug and Diagnostic Initiative (ANDI), KCCR, Seeding Labs/Novartis, Teaching and Learning Innovation Fund (World Bank Award) and a PhD Fellowship from Cancer Research UK. He was awarded the Africa Role Model in Academic Excellence Lifetime Achievement at the 13th Transform Africa Conference & Africa Role Model Awards in September 2022.

== Professional memberships and affiliations ==
Owusu-Dabo is a fellow of the West African College of Physicians, Ghana College of Physicians and Surgeons and a member of the American Society of Tropical Medicine and Hygiene, Convention of Biomedical Research, Ghana (CobreG), Ghana Medical and Dental Council and the Ghana Medical Association.

== Books and selected publications ==
- Author, book chapter; Review of Non-Communicable Disease Epidemiology in Ghana, 2014
- Author, Seeing through the smoke: The Global Smoking epidemic-a Snapshot of smoking cessation trends, 2008
- Ofori-Acquah, Solomon; Hazra, Rimi; Orikogbo, Oluwaseun O; Crosby, Danielle; Flage, Bethany; Ackah, Ezekiel Bonwin; Lenhart, Diane; Tan, Roderick J; Vitturi, Dario A; Paintsil, Vivian; Owusu-Dabo, Ellis; Ghosh, Samit; SickleGenAfrica, Network. (10 February 2020). "Hemopexin deficiency promotes acute kidney injury in sickle cell disease". Blood. 135 (13): 1044–1048. doi:10.1182/blood.2019002653. PMC 7218735. PMID 32043112.
- Kaminski, Lea-Christina; Riehn, Mathias; Abel, Annemieke; Steeg, Christiane; Yar, Denis Dekugmen; Addai-Mensah, Otchere; Aminkiah, Francis; Owusu Dabo, Ellis; Jacobs, Thomas; Mackroth, Maria Sophia (11 December 2019). "Cytotoxic T Cell-Derived Granzyme B Is Increased in Severe Plasmodium Falciparum Malaria". Frontiers in Immunology. 10: 2917. doi:10.3389/fimmu.2019.02917. PMC 6918797. PMID 31921176.
- Frickmann, Hagen; Wiemer, Dorothea Franziska; Wassill, Lars; Hinz, Rebecca; Rojak, Sandra; Wille, Andreas; Loderstädt, Ulrike; Schwarz, Norbert Georg; von Kalckreuth, Vera; Im, Justin; Jin Jeon, Hyon; Marks, Florian; Owusu-Dabo, Ellis; Sarpong, Nimako; May, Jürgen; Eibach, Daniel; Dekker, Denise (February 2019). "Loop-mediated isothermal amplification-based detection of typhoid fever on an automated Genie II Mk2 system – A case-control-based approach". Acta Tropica. 190: 293–295. doi:10.1016/j.actatropica.2018.12.004. PMID 30528158.
- Falgenhauer, Linda; Imirzalioglu, Can; Oppong, Kwabena; Akenten, Charity Wiafe; Hogan, Benedikt; Krumkamp, Ralf; Poppert, Sven; Levermann, Vinzent; Schwengers, Oliver; Sarpong, Nimako; Owusu-Dabo, Ellis; May, Jürgen; Eibach, Daniel (15 January 2019). "Detection and Characterization of ESBL-Producing Escherichia coli From Humans and Poultry in Ghana". Frontiers in Microbiology. 9: 3358. doi:10.3389/fmicb.2018.03358. PMC 6340976. PMID 30697208.
- Chilunga, Felix P; Henneman, Peter; Meeks, Karlijn AC; Beune, Erik; Requena-Méndez, Ana; Smeeth, Liam; Addo, Juliet; Bahendeka, Silver; Danquah, Ina; Schulze, Matthias B; Spranger, Joachim; Owusu-Dabo, Ellis; Klipstein-Grobusch, Kerstin; Mannens, Marcel MAM; Agyemang, Charles (December 2019). "Prevalence and determinants of type 2 diabetes among lean African migrants and non-migrants: the RODAM study". Journal of Global Health. 9 (2) 020426. doi:10.7189/jogh.09.020426. PMC 6815658. PMID 31673340.
- Dekker, Denise; Eibach, Daniel; Boahen, Kennedy G.; Akenten, Charity Wiafe; Pfeifer, Yvonne; Zautner, Andreas E.; Mertens, Eva; Krumkamp, Ralf; Jaeger, Anna; Flieger, Antje; Owusu-Dabo, Ellis; May, Jürgen (May 2019). "Fluoroquinolone-Resistant Salmonella enterica, Campylobacter spp., and Arcobacter butzleri from Local and Imported Poultry Meat in Kumasi, Ghana". Foodborne Pathogens and Disease. 16 (5): 352–358. doi:10.1089/fpd.2018.2562. PMC 6529854. PMID 30907631.
- Nyaaba, Gertrude Nsorma; Stronks, Karien; Meeks, Karlijn; Beune, Erik; Owusu-Dabo, Ellis; Addo, Juliet; de-Graft Aikins, Ama; Mockenhaupt, Frank; Bahendeka, Silver; Klipstein-Grobusch, Kerstin; Smeeth, Liam; Agyemang, Charles (September 2019). "Is social support associated with hypertension control among Ghanaian migrants in Europe and non-migrants in Ghana? The RODAM study". Internal and Emergency Medicine. 14 (6): 957–966. doi:10.1007/s11739-019-02075-7. PMC 6722196. PMID 30912002. S2CID 85517939.
- Acheampong, Godfred; Owusu, Michael; Owusu-Ofori, Alex; Osei, Isaac; Sarpong, Nimako; Sylverken, Augustina; Kung, Hung-Jui; Cho, Shu-Ting; Kuo, Chih-Horng; Park, Se Eun; Marks, Florian; Adu-Sarkodie, Yaw; Owusu-Dabo, Ellis (December 2019). "Chromosomal and plasmid-mediated fluoroquinolone resistance in human Salmonella enterica infection in Ghana". BMC Infectious Diseases. 19 (1): 898. doi:10.1186/s12879-019-4522-1. PMC 6819380. PMID 31660876.
- Mohammed, Aliyu; Acheampong, Princess Ruhama; Otupiri, Easmon; Osei, Francis Adjei; Larson-Reindorf, Roderick; Owusu-Dabo, Ellis (December 2019). "Mobile phone short message service (SMS) as a malaria control tool: a quasi-experimental study". BMC Public Health. 19 (1): 1193. doi:10.1186/s12889-019-7336-6. PMC 6716929. PMID 31464623. S2CID 201664424.
- Kwarteng, Alexander; Arthur, Yarhands Dissou; Yamba, John Kanyiri; Sylverken, Augustina A.; Kini, Priscilla; Ahuno, Samuel Terkper; Owusu-Dabo, Ellis (December 2019). "Influence of seasonal variation on reported filarial attacks among people living with lymphedema in Ghana". BMC Infectious Diseases. 19 (1): 442. doi:10.1186/s12879-019-4084-2. PMC 6528377. PMID 31109288.
