= Samuel Kwofie =

Ghanaian politician

Samuel Kwofie Samuel Kwofie

Member of parliament for Ahanta West constituency
- In office 7 January 1997 – 6 January 2001
- President: John Jerry Rawlings

Personal details
- Born: Ahanta West, Western Region, Ghana)
- Party: New Patriotic Party
- Occupation: Politician

Samuel Kwofie is a former Ghanaian politician and a member of the Second Parliament of the Fourth Republic representing the Ahanta West constituency in the Western Region of Ghana.

== Early life ==
Samuel was born at Ahanta West in the Western Region of Ghana.

== Politics ==
Samuel was first elected into Parliament on the ticket of the New Patriotic Party for the Ahanta West Constituency in the Western Region of Ghana. During the December 1996 Ghanaian general elections. He defeated Isaac K. Brace of the People's National Congress, Francis M.Fynn of the National Democratic Congress, Kaku Aluade of the Convention People's Party and Moses Andoh of the National Congress Party. He was defeated by Samuel Johnfiah during his Party Parliamentary Primary Elections.
