= John Yaw Assasie =

Ghanaian soldier and broadcasting executive

5th Director-General of the GBC
- In office 1975–1981
- President: Ignatius Kutu Acheampong
- Preceded by: Lebrecht Wilhelm Fifi Hesse
- Succeeded by: Kwame Karikari

Personal details
- Born: John Yaw Assasie Gold Coast
- Education: Takoradi College
- Alma mater: Ghana Military Academy
- Occupation: General Manager & Director-General of the GBC (1975–1981)

John Yaw Assasie was a Ghanaian soldier. He served as Chairman of the Northern Region Committee of Administration (Northern Regional Minister) during the NLC regime, and the Director General of the Ghana Broadcasting Corporation from 1975 to 1981.

== Early life and education ==
Assasie had his early education at Sekondi E. C. M, Takoradi Methodist School, Berekum Catholic School and finally at Konongo Catholic School. He had his secondary education at Takoradi College after which he enlisted in the Gold Coast Army as a private in 1950. He continued his education through correspondence courses and the Army Education Corps. He also attended the Officers course at the Ghana Military Academy, Teshie (then called the Military Academy Training School). He left for the United Kingdom for further studies at Aldershot after which he was commissioned Lieutenant in 1959.

== Career ==
He served on the third Battalion of the Ghana Army from 1960 to 1961, and from 1961 to 1967, he worked with the Airborne Training School and the Parachute Battalion in Tamale. He served as the second in Command at the Airborne Training School and Commander of the Parachute Battalion.

During the NLC regime, he served as the Chairman of the Northern Region Committee of Administration (Northern Regional Minister). He retired from the military in September 1968. Following his retirement, he worked as a private businessman and a farmer until his appointment as Director of the Cargo Handling Company in May 1972. In 1975, he was appointed Director General of the Ghana Broadcasting Corporation. He served in this capacity until 1981. During the PNDC regime, he was appointed Political Counsellor for the Economic Development of Committees for the Defence of the Revolution (CDRs).

== Personal life ==
He is married to Christiana Assasie. Together, they have seven children. His hobbies include football (he played the number 6 position for the Ghana Army football team), volleyball, hockey, swimming, table tennis, and athletics.
