= Stephen Bekoe Mfodwo =

Ghanaian academic and broadcasting executive

3rd Director-General of the GBC
- In office 1970–1972
- President: Edward Akufo-Addo
- Prime Minister: Kofi Abrefa Busia
- Preceded by: William Frank Kobina Coleman
- Succeeded by: Lebrecht Wilhelm Fifi Hesse

Personal details
- Born: Stephen Bekoe Mfodwo; 18 July 1930 Akuapem Akropong, Gold Coast
- Died: 2015 (aged 84–85)
- Education: Achimota School
- Alma mater: University of Ghana
- Occupation: General Manager & Director-General of the GBC (1970–1972)

Stephen Kofi Bekoe Mfodwo (18 July 1930 – 2015) was a Ghanaian public servant. He served as the Director General of the Ghana Broadcasting Corporation from 1970 to 1972.

== Early life and education ==
Born on 18 July 1930, Mfodwo hailed from Akropong Akuapem in the Eastern Region of Ghana (then the Eastern Colony of the Gold Coast). He was given the name of his maternal grandfather, Nana Mfodwo, who was then the Adumhene of Akuapem. He enrolled at Achimota College in January 1945 for his secondary education on a government scholarship. There, he was made to join the second year students instead of those in their first year. In December 1948, Mfodwo obtained his Cambridge School Certificate, and continued with his sixth form education at Achimota College in January 1949. Following the completion of his sixth form education, he obtained his Cambridge Higher School Certificate in December 1950. He was later admitted to the University of Ghana in October 1951 to read English. He graduated in June 1954 and was awarded a bachelor's degree. He returned to the University of Ghana in October 1955 for his postgraduate studies, he completed the program in June 1955 and was awarded a Post-Graduate Certificate in Education.

== Career ==
Mfodwo joined the Gold Coast Broadcasting System (now Ghana Broadcasting Corporation) in early 1956. Later in 1956, he was sent to the United Kingdom for a one-year attachment with the British Broadcasting Corporation. After spending about six years with the Ghana Broadcasting Corporation, Mfodwo gained employment at the University of Ghana as an Assistant Registrar in April 1962. In 1970, he returned to the Ghana Broadcasting Corporation working as the Director General. He served in this capacity until August 1972. He consequently returned to the University of Ghana as a Senior Assistant Registrar and later, a Deputy Registrar. He was succeeded by Lebrecht Wilhem Fifi Hesse. He remained in the position of a Deputy Registrar until his retirement.

== Honours and death ==
Mfodwo was awarded an honorary doctorate degree by the University of Ghana. He was a Christian and a member of the Presbyterian Church of Ghana. He was married to Esther (née Sao), and together, they had three children. Aside from the English language, Mfodwo was knowledgeable in the Twi and Ga languages. He died in 2015.
