= Mokowa Blay Adu-Gyamfi =

Ghanaian diplomat and doctor

- Preceded by: Kabral Blay Amihere

High Commissioner of Ghana to Sierra Leone
- In office 2009–2005

Presidential advisor on HIV/AIDS at the Office of the President of Ghana
- Incumbent
- Assumed office 2021

Personal details
- Born: Sekondi, Western Region
- Spouse: Yaw Adu-Gyamfi
- Education: Wesley Girls' Senior High School; University of Ghana Medical School; Glasgow University
- Occupation: Medical doctor
- Profession: Diplomat

Mokowa Blay Adu-Gyamfi is a former Ghanaian diplomat. In the 1960s, she was part of the first batch of doctors to be trained in Ghana. As at 2022, she is the Presidential advisor on HIV/AIDS at the Office of the President of Ghana.

== Early life and education ==
Adu-Gyamfi hails from Sekondi in the Western Region of Ghana. She attended the Wesley Girls' where she completed her 'O' levels in 1959 and further had her 'A' level. She is an alumna of University of Ghana. In 1969, she had both her Bachelor of medicine and Bachelor of surgery from the University of Ghana Medical School. She also has a certificate in Family Planning from the Family Planning Association of Great Britain. She also has a postgraduate degree in family and community medicine, venereal diseases and family planning from the Glasgow University in the United Kingdom.

== Career ==
Adu-Gyamfi is a medical doctor by profession. In 2002, she was the National co-ordinator on AIDS program at the Korle-Bu Teaching Hospital in Accra. She is also a founding fellow of the Ghana College of Physicians and Surgeons and also a fellow of the West African College of Physicians.

In 2017, she was appointed by Nana Akufo-Addo as the Director-General at the Ghana AIDS Commission.

She is also a board member of Joberg Foundation, an NGO of Joberg Ghana Limited, a construction company.

=== Notable work ===
- Family Planning as a Means of Promoting Health

== Ambassadorial role ==
Adu-Gyamfi was the High Commissioner of Ghana to Sierra Leone from 2005 to 2009. She replaced Kabral Blay-Amihere as the High Commissioner of Ghana to Sierra Leone.

== Personal life ==
Adu-Gyamfi is married to Yaw Adu-Gyamfi, a Ghanaian professor. She is a descendant of R. S. Blay.
