= Sunrise FM (Ghana) =

- Koforidua; Ghana
- Broadcast area: Eastern region
- Frequency: 106.7 MHz,102.1 MHz

Programming
- Languages: English, Twi
- Format: Local news, talk and music

Ownership
- Owner: Ghana Broadcasting Corporation

Sunrise FM is a public radio station in Koforidua, the capital town of the Eastern region of Ghana. It is located in Effiduase a suburb of the Koforidua township. The station is owned and run by the state broadcaster, the Ghana Broadcasting Corporation.
