= URA Radio =

Bolgatanga; Ghana
- Broadcast area: Upper East Region
- Frequency: 89.7 MHz,

Programming
- Languages: English, French, Guruni, Kusaal, Kasem, Buli and Bissa
- Format: Local news, talk and music

Ownership
- Owner: Ghana Broadcasting Corporation

URA Radio is a public radio station in Bolgatanga, the capital town of the Upper East Region of Ghana. The station is owned and run by the state broadcaster – the Ghana Broadcasting Corporation.
