= Uniiq FM =

- Accra; Ghana
- Broadcast area: Greater Accra Region
- Frequency: 95.7 MHz

Programming
- Languages: English, Ga language
- Format: Local news, talk and music

Ownership
- Owner: Ghana Broadcasting Corporation

History
- First air date: 1994

Uniiq is a public radio station in Accra, the capital town of the Greater Accra Region of Ghana. The station is owned and run by the state broadcaster - the Ghana Broadcasting Corporation.
