= Rennie Keith =

Scottish cricketer (born 1971)

Personal information
- Full name: Rennie Alexander Keith
- Born: 19 August 1971 (age 55); Glasgow, Lanarkshire, Scotland
- Batting: Right-handed
- Bowling: Right-arm medium

Domestic team information
- Years: Team
- 1999: Scotland

Career statistics
Competition	List A
Matches	1
Runs scored	24
Batting average	24.00
100s/50s	–/–
Top score	24
Catches/stumpings	–/–
- Source: Cricinfo, 22 October 2022

Rennie Alexander Keith (born 19 August 1971) is a former Scottish cricketer.

Keith was born at Glasgow in August 1971, where he was educated at Kelvinside Academy. A club cricketer for Clydesdale, he was noted as being the most improved cricketer on the Scottish club circuit in 1996. He was later selected to play for Scotland in a List A one-day match against Dorset at Glasgow in the 2nd Round of the 1999 NatWest Trophy, with the Scottish side being described as a "second string". Opening the batting alongside Bryn Lockie, he scored 24 runs before being dismissed by Vyvian Pike; Scotland went on to win the match by 76 runs.
