= Donald MacDougall =

Scottish economist and civil servant

Sir George Donald Alastair MacDougall, CBE, FBA (26 October 1912 – 22 March 2004) was a Scottish economist and civil servant who influenced UK public policy during the 1960s.

== Early life ==
MacDougall was born in Glasgow in 1912, the son of a family with a china business, and was educated at Kelvinside Academy, Shrewsbury School and Balliol College, Oxford.

During the Second World War, he worked in the Prime Minister's Statistical Branch, and was appointed a CBE in the 1945 Prime Minister's Resignation Honours.

== Career ==
Dougall headed the Government Economic Service and, between 1969 and 1973, acted as chief economic adviser to Chancellors of the Exchequer Roy Jenkins, Iain Macleod and Anthony Barber. He predicted in about 2000 that the euro currency could not work and that the EU Stability and Growth Pact would not be enforced.
