= Lebrecht Wilhelm Fifi Hesse =

Ghanaian public servant and broadcasting executive

4th and 7th Director-General of the GBC
- In office 1972–1975
- President: Ignatius Kutu Acheampong
- Preceded by: Stephen Bekoe Mfodwo
- Succeeded by: John Yaw Assasie
- In office 1984–1988
- President: Jerry John Rawlings
- Preceded by: Kwame Karikari
- Succeeded by: George Aryee

Personal details
- Born: Lebrecht Wilhelm Fifi Hesse; 16 November 1934 Gold Coast
- Died: 18 October 2000 (aged 65) Accra, Ghana
- Spouse: Charity Caeser
- Relations: Virginia Hesse (sister)
- Children: Leonora, Ruby Lebrecht
- Education: Accra Academy; Achimota School
- Alma mater: University College of Ghana/ University of London; Oriel College, Oxford
- Occupation: Public Servant; General Manager & Director-General of the GBC (1972–1975 and 1984–1988)
- Known for: First black African Rhodes Scholar

Lebrecht Wilhelm Fifi Hesse (16 November 1934 – 18 October 2000) was a Ghanaian public servant and the first black African Rhodes Scholar. He served as Director-General of the Ghana Broadcasting Corporation on two occasions. He was also a member of the Public Services Commission of Ghana.

== Early life and education ==
A member of the notable Hesse family, L. W. Fifi Hesse was born on Friday 16 November 1934. He had his early education at Osu Presbyterian Boarding School, Salem and his secondary education at the Accra Academy. In 1952, while at the Accra Academy, he won a national essay competition that was organised by the then Gold Coast authorities to mark the coronation of Queen Elizabeth II. Two years later, he won a competition that was organised by the New York Herald Tribune to select students for the newspaper's annual World Youth Forum which was held in New York City. Through this experience, he was able to obtain visits to Israel, Egypt and India. At school, his favourite subjects were Latin, Literature and History, he also served as the president of the school's branch of the United Nations Students Association (GUNSA).

He was abroad when he was informed he had gained admission into Achimota School for his sixth form education. In 1957, he gained admission to the University College of Ghana on a Shell Ghana Independence Scholarship, awarded to only four students nationally to mark Ghana's independence. At the time, the university was a constituent college of the University of London external system. He completed in 1960 with his bachelor's degree in history, awarded by the University of London. That same year, he applied for postgraduate study and won a Rhodes Scholarship to Oxford University, becoming the first black African and the first Ghanaian for that matter to achieve this feat. He read Politics, Philosophy and Economics at Oriel College, Oxford from 1960 to 1962.

== Career ==
On his return to Ghana, he was asked by Kwame Nkrumah to join Dr. W. E. B. Dubois to work on the Encyclopedia Africana which was being funded by Kwame Nkrumah. He worked as a research officer and later became an editorial secretary. In 1972, he was appointed director-general of the Ghana Broadcasting Corporation. He served in that capacity until 1975 when he was appointed Principal Assistant Secretary for the Ministry of Education and Culture as an administrator in the Ghana Civil Service. Fifi Hesse was moved to be a member of the Administrative Corps of the Osu Castle which was the Ghanaian seat of government. He served as the Principal Secretary of the Provisional National Defence Council (PNDC) Coordinating Secretary's Office and in 1984 he was posted back to the Ghana Broadcasting Corporation again as director-general until 1988. In 1988, he was appointed member of the Public Services Commission, he served in that capacity until his death in 2000.

== Personal life ==
Hesse's hobbies were swimming and reading. He was also a theatre fan and loved to read books he had seen filmed earlier in theatres.

He married Charity Caeser, a fashion designer, in 1963 and together they had two daughters, a physician and a lawyer, as well as a son, a commercial pilot. L. W. Fifi Hesse's brother, Christian Hesse, served as Ghana's ambassador to the Soviet Union and subsequently to Russia in the 1980s and 1990s while his sister, Virginia Hesse was appointed the Ghanaian ambassador to the Czech Republic in 2017, serving in that position until 2021.

== Death and funeral ==
He died of cancer on 18 October 2000. Hesse's funeral service was held at the Ebenezer Presbyterian Church, Osu, where he was the Senior Presbyter, after which his remains were buried at the Basel Mission Cemetery in Osu, Accra.
