= David Anaglate =

Ghanaian diplomat, public servant and broadcasting executive

Ghana Ambassador to Togo
- In office 1996–2001
- Appointed by: John Jerry Rawlings
- Succeeded by: Kwabena Mensah-Bonsu

9th Director-General of the GBC
- In office 1992–1995
- President: Jerry John Rawlings
- Preceded by: George Aryee
- Succeeded by: Kofi Frimpong

Personal details
- Born: 1935 Gold Coast
- Died: 12 September 2022 (aged 86–87)
- Education: Ghana Senior High Technical School (Takoradi)
- Alma mater: Kwame Nkrumah University of Science and Technology; Ryerson University; University of Ghana; Ghana School of Law
- Occupation: General manager & Director-General of the GBC (1992–1995); Public Servant; diplomat
- Profession: Journalist; Lawyer

David Kwasi Anaglate was a Ghanaian journalist, lawyer and public servant. He was the Director General of the Ghana Broadcasting Corporation (GBC) from 1992 to 1995, and Ghana's ambassador to Togo from 1996 to 2001. He is the Chairman of the Ghana Association of past Broadcasters of GBC (GASBROAD), and head of the Anaglate family.

== Early life and education ==
Anaglate had his secondary education at the Ghana Senior High Technical School (Takoradi) prior to obtaining his Intermediate bachelor's degree from the Kwame Nkrumah University of Science and Technology (then Kumasi College Technology) in 1959. He later studied Radio-TV Arts at Ryerson University (then Ryerson Polytechnical Institute) in Toronto, Canada. In 1980, he obtained his bachelor of laws degree (LLB) from the University of Ghana. He later entered the Ghana School of Law where he graduated in 1981 as a Barrister-at-Law.

== Career ==
After his studies at the Kwame Nkrumah University of Science and Technology, he joined Graphic Corporation, and also taught French and Mathematics until 1962 when he joined the Ghana Broadcasting Corporation (GBC). At GBC, he worked as a newsman. He was later put in charge of Programmes, News and Current Affairs in 1982, and six years later, he was appointed deputy Director-General of the Ghana Broadcasting Corporation.

As a journalist, he was elected a member of the executive body of the Ghana Journalists Association (GJA) in 1976. He was elected to serve on the Ghana Press Commission as one of the Ghana Journalists Association's two representatives.

In 1992 Anaglate was appointed Director General of the Ghana Broadcasting Corporation. He served in this capacity until 1995. Prior to his retirement in 1995, he was relieved of his duties and replaced by Dr. Kofi Frimpong who acted as Director-General for the period. Anaglate was later reinstated as Director-General until his retirement in 1995. He was succeeded by his then deputy, Dr. Kofi Frimpong. A year later, he was appointed Ghana's ambassador to Togo. He held this post from 1996 to 2001. He was succeeded by Mr. Kwabena Mensah-Bonsu.
