= Biadan =

Coordinates: 7°26′N 2°36′W

- Interactive map of Biadan
- Country: Ghana
- Region: Bono region

Biadan is a town in the Bono Region of Ghana. The town is known for the Methodist Secondary Technical School. The school is a second cycle institution.
