= Kofi Frimpong (diplomat) =

Ghanaian diplomat, academic and broadcasting executive

Dr Kofi Sarpong Frimpong

Ghana High Commissioner to Namibia
- In office 2000–2001
- Appointed by: John Jerry Rawlings
- Succeeded by: Maureen Abla Amematekpor

10th Director-General of the GBC
- In office 1995–1999
- President: Jerry John Rawlings
- Preceded by: David Anaglate
- Succeeded by: Gilbert Adanusa (acting)

Chief Manager, Social Security and National Insurance Trust

Political Specialist, American Embassy

Director, Structural Adjustment Programme Secretariat

Personal details
- Born: Gold Coast
- Died: 5 January 2005
- Education: Adisadel College, University of Ghana
- Occupation: General manager & Director-General of the GBC (1995–1999); Public Servant; diplomat
- Profession: Academic

Dr. Kofi Sarpong Frimpong was a Ghanaian public servant and diplomat. He was the Director General of the Ghana Broadcasting Corporation from 1995 to 1999, and Ghana's High Commissioner to Namibia from 2000 to 2001. He died on 5 January 2005 in Rockville, Maryland, USA.

== Career ==
Dr Kofi Frimpong was the host of the programme, Periscope from 1970 to 1978. He was the originator and the quiz master for the popular Television and Radio quiz show, What do you know (which was then on radio) from 1972 to 1983. As a Political Scientist, he served as a senior lecturer at the University of Maiduguri's Political Science department. He also served as a senior lecturer at the Political Science Department at the University of Ghana, Legon. He also worked at the Social Security and National Insurance Trust in Accra as the Chief Manager responsible for Public Affairs. In 1987, he was the Director for the Structural Adjustment Programme Secretariat. He served in this capacity until 1991. A year later, he was appointed Special Assistant to the Ghana Secretary for Finance and Economic Planning on Global Coalition for Africa. He worked at the American Embassy in Accra as a Political Specialist from 1993 until his appointment as the Director General of the Ghana Broadcasting Corporation in 1995. He served in position from 1995 to 1999. Frimpong was 56 years old at the time of his appointment in 1995.

In 2000 Frimpong was appointed Ghana's High Commissioner to Namibia. He served in this post for about one year. He died on 5 January 2005 in Rockville, Maryland, USA.
