= Radio Upper West =

Wa; Ghana
- Broadcast area: Upper West Region
- Frequency: 90.1 MHz,

Programming
- Languages: English, French
- Format: Local news, talk and music

Ownership
- Owner: Ghana Broadcasting Corporation

Radio Upper West is a public radio station in Wa, the capital town of the Upper West Region of Ghana. The station is owned and run by the state broadcaster - the Ghana Broadcasting Corporation.
