= George Aryee =

Ghanaian public servant and broadcasting executive

8th Director-General of the GBC
- In office 1991–1992
- President: John Jerry Rawlings
- Preceded by: Lebrecht Wilhelm Fifi Hesse
- Succeeded by: David Anaglate

Personal details
- Born: George Aryee Gold Coast
- Education: Adisadel College; Wesley College of Education, Kumasi
- Alma mater: University of Cape Coast; University of Ottawa
- Occupation: Public Servant; General Manager & Director-General of the GBC (1991–1992)

George Aryee is a Ghanaian public servant. He served as the Director General of the Ghana Broadcasting Corporation from 1991 to 1992.

== Early life and education ==
Aryee had his secondary education at Adisadel College, Cape Coast, and later continued at Wesley College, Kumasi to train as a teacher in 1959. After his teacher training, he enrolled at the University of Cape Coast where he graduated with a bachelor's degree in 1969. A year later he obtained a Canadian International Development Agency (CIDA) sponsored scholarship to study at the University of Ottawa, Canada, where he obtained his Master's degree in Administration.

== Career ==
Following his studies abroad, Aryee joined the Advanced Teacher Training College, Winneba (one of the colleges that were merged to create the University of Education, Winneba) as a lecturer. He later worked at Central Regional Development Corporation as its Managing Director, and the African Timber and Plywood company as a Training and Development Manager and later its Public Relations Manager. Prior to his appointment as Director General of Ghana Broadcasting Corporation, he was the managing director of a food processing company called Tema Food Complex. Aryee served as the Director General of the Ghana Broadcasting Corporation from 1991 to 1992.

== See also ==
- Ghana Broadcasting Corporation
