= Berekum Sports Stadium =

Sports venue in Berekum, Ghana

Golden City Park
- Berekum Sports Stadium
- Interactive map of Golden City Park
- Full name: Berekum Golden City Park
- Location: Berekum, Bono Region, Ghana
- Coordinates: 7.4538°N 2.585°W
- Capacity: 5,000

Tenants
- Berekum Arsenal; Berekum Chelsea

Berekum Golden City Park, also known as Berekum Sports Stadium, is a multi-use stadium in Berekum, Bono Region, in Ghana. It is managed by the Berekum Municipal Assembly. The grounds are mainly used for football matches. The stadium has a capacity of 5,000.

== Pitch conditions ==
Best known as the home grounds of Berekum Chelsea F.C., in March 2025 Golden City Park was rejected by the Ghana Football Association (GFA) Licensing Committee due to safety issues and the substandard condition of the pitch. Pitch conditions and maintenance have long been an issue at Golden City Park; in 2020, critics complained that it was "browning and sand-filled". The GFA had previously restored the conditional license for Golden City Park in April 2021 due to improvements made by both Berekum Chelsea and Berekum Arsenal F.C.

In 2010, the stadium was renovated in preparation for Berekum Chelsea FC's CAF Champions League matches. Philanthropists donated a new borehole pump at Golden City Park to provide access to water supply for pitch maintenance in 2017.

== Other developments ==
In 2017, a visiting club official alleged that fans were allowed to smoke marijuana at Golden City Park, while police looked the other way. In 2019, Berekum Chelsea were temporarily banned from using Golden City Park after a violent incident in which a visiting official fired a gun and home fans pelted him with stones. In 2024, the stadium at Berekum Golden City Park was raided by thieves who stole lighting equipment.
