= Twin City Radio =

Sekondi; Ghana
- Broadcast area: Western
- Frequencies: 94.7 MHz, and 88.1 MHz

Programming
- Languages: English, French, Nzema and Fante languages
- Format: Local news, talk and music

Ownership
- Owner: Ghana Broadcasting Corporation

History
- First air date: 1994

Links
- Website: http://www.gbcghana.com and www.twincityradio.com

Twin City Radio is a public radio station in Sekondi-Takoradi, the capital town of the Western of Ghana. The station is owned and run by the state broadcaster - the Ghana Broadcasting Corporation.
