= Radio BAR =

- Sunyani; Ghana
- Broadcast area: Brong Ahafo Region
- Frequency: 93.5 MHz,

Programming
- Languages: English, French, Twi
- Format: Local news, talk and music

Ownership
- Owner: Ghana Broadcasting Corporation

Radio BAR is a public radio station in Sunyani, the capital town of the Brong Ahafo Region of Ghana. The station is owned and run by the state broadcaster - the Ghana Broadcasting Corporation.
