= Regina Hesse =

Gold Coast educator

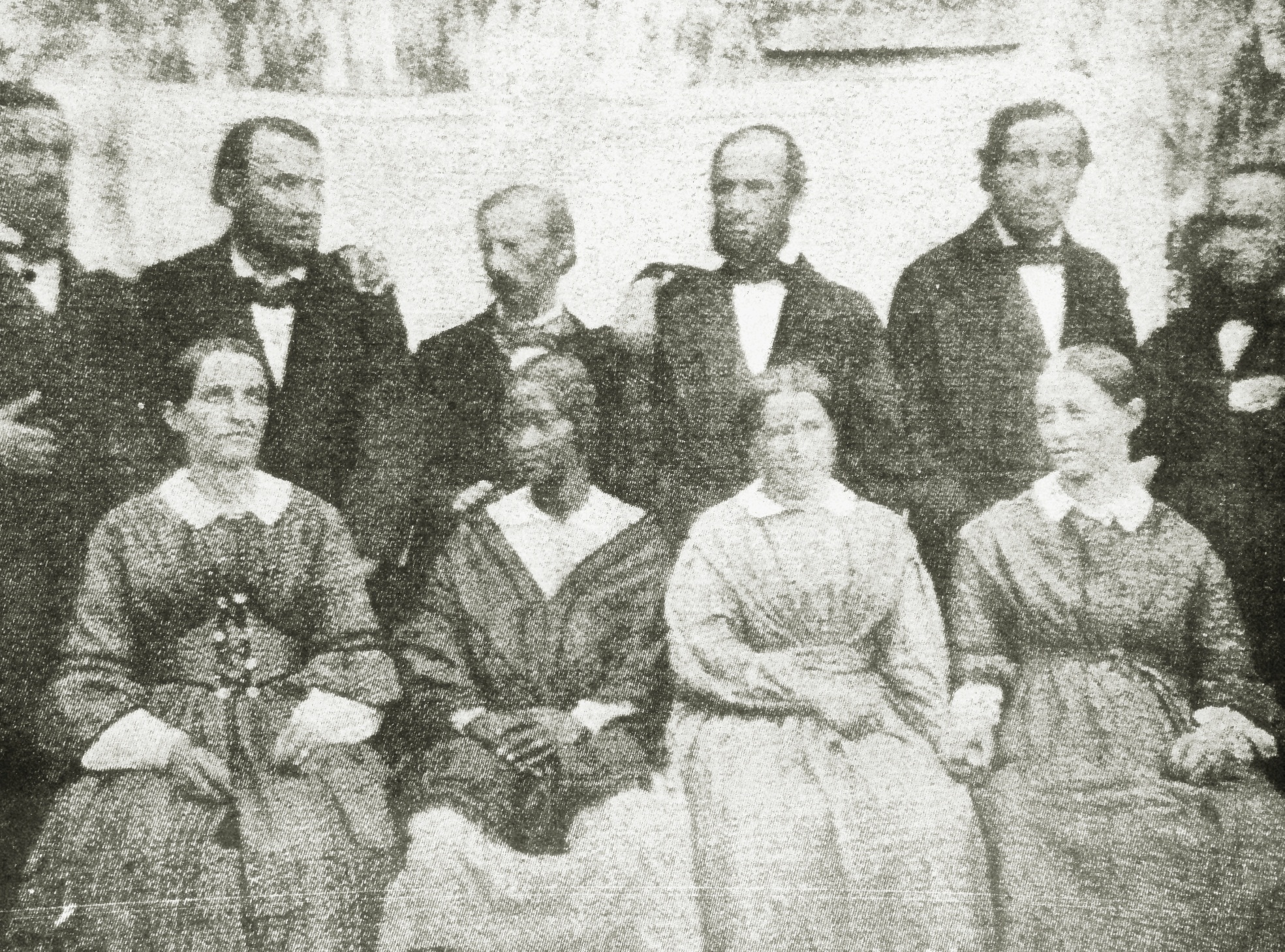
- Regina Hesse, seated second from left, with her husband, Hermann Ludwig Rottmann, standing behind her, Christiansborg, c. 1860
- Born: 1832; Accra, Gold Coast
- Died: 1898 (aged 65–66); Basel, Switzerland
- Education: Christiansborg Castle School; Basel Mission Girls' School
- Occupations: Schoolteacher; Education administrator
- Known for: Pioneer in women's education on the Gold Coast; Empowerment of women on the Gold Coast
- Spouse: Hermann Ludwig Rottmann (m. 1857)
- Children: 8
- Parents: Herman Hesse (father); Charlotte Lamiorakai (mother)
- Relatives: Hesse family; Alexander Worthy Clerk (brother-in-law)

Regina Hesse (1832–1898), also Rottmann, was a Euro-African schoolteacher in colonial Ghana. As an educationist, she was one of first women exemplars on the Gold Coast to become a school administrator. Hesse was trained by the Angolan-born Jamaican Moravian pioneer woman teacher, Catherine Mulgrave who set up three girls’ specialist boarding schools at Osu, Abokobi and Odumase and was active in the women's Christian ministry in Christiansborg, Accra.

== Early life and education ==
Regina Hesse was born in Christiansborg, Accra in 1832 to a Euro-African merchant, Herman Hesse and a Ga woman, Charlotte Lamiorkai, who hailed from a trading family at Shai Hills. The Hesse family was an influential Euro-African trading family from Osu Amantra with German-Danish ancestry and active in coastal commerce. Hesse's paternal grandfather, Dr. Lebrecht Wilhelm Hesse, was an eighteenth century German-Danish physician. Her sister, Pauline Hesse (1831–1909), was a trader whose husband, Alexander Worthy Clerk, a Jamaican Moravian missionary-educationalist co-founded the Salem School, Osu. Clerk had arrived on the Gold Coast in 1843 with a group of 24 West Indian mission recruits under the sponsorship of the Basel Mission and leadership of the Danish minister, Andreas Riis. Regina Hesse also had other sisters, Mary (Mrs. Richter) and Wilhelmina, who later became Mrs. Briandt. Her brother, William Hesse (1834–1920) was a minister of the Basel Mission. Regina Hesse also had a brother, John Hesse who was a trader. In 1854, after the British authorities bombarded Osu using the naval vessel, “HMS Scourge”, over the refusal of indigenes to pay the poll tax, another brother John Hesse, fled inland to Akropong and engaged in petty trading, together with other Ga-Dangme trader–refugees who had also been displaced by the conflict. Regina Hesse was educated at the Basel Mission School at the Christiansborg Castle in 1847 when Catherine Mulgrave was appointed the director of the institution after the society took over the operations of the school. Earlier, one of her schoolmates was the Gold Coast Basel Mission pastor and historian, Carl Christian Reindorf (1834–1934), whose seminal book, The History of the Gold Coast and Asante, was published in 1895. The castle school, originally opened in 1722 and owned by the Danes, was handed over to the Basel Mission after the Danish colonial administration sold its assets on the Gold Coast to British authorities in 1850. Danish was the original medium of instruction at the Christiansborg School before a switch to the English language after the Basel Mission took over the operations of the school. A similar school existed at the Cape Coast Castle that primarily served mulatto children of Euro-African families on the coast. Regina Hesse was a polyglot - fluent in the Ga, English, Danish, German and Twi.

== Women’s education and Christian ministry ==
In 1850, when Regina Hesse was about eighteen years old, she was confirmed in the Basel Mission Church, Christiansborg and promoted from monitor to teacher. The following year in 1851, she moved into the household of her protégée, Catherine Mulgrave and her husband, Johannes Zimmermann. She later became the de facto headmistress of Catherine Mulgrave's girls' school at Osu. Additionally, Hesse had a great working relationship with her Mulgrave's official successor, Rosina Stanger. Thus, Regina Hesse was influential in shaping the framework for the girls’ education programme through her efficient management and administration of the school. After her marriage in 1857, she became a full time missionary wife. She was also active in the women's Christian ministry and fellowship which led to a significant increase in congregants, including her own extended family, in her home church, the Basel Mission Church, Christiansborg, now known as the Ebenezer Presbyterian Church, Osu. Under her tutelage in the 1880s, more women participated in activities relating to Bible study and prayer meetings.

== Personal life ==
In 1857, Regina Hesse married German native, Hermann Ludwig Rottmann, the first Basel missionary-trader in Christiansborg and the founder of the Basel Mission Trading Company, first entered in the Commercial Register of Basel in 1859, under its German name, "Missions-Handlungs-Gesellschaft Basel". Rottmann's father was a German tobacco manufacturer. H. L. Rottmann had earlier completed his education in commerce in Hamburg, Germany's "Gate to the Seven Seas." After arriving on the Gold Coast in 1854, he opened a hardware shop in Christiansborg, selling goods and building materials for the local burgeoning construction industry: ropes, wires, hammers, saws, nails, bolts, hinges and door handles. This shop evolved into the Basel Mission Trading Company. The trading company was originally financed by Basel patricians, industrialists and politicians such as Daniel Burckhardt, Karl Sarasin and Christoph Median-Burckhardt. Like Johannes Zimmermann, Rottmann saw Africa as his home, a view he communicated to his supervisors on the Gold Coast and to the Home Committee in Basel. In approving his marriage to Regina Hesse, the committee saw the Hesse family's local mercantile connections as beneficial to Basel Mission trading activities. The couple had eight children but three died at an early age. All surviving children worked with the Basel Mission in one capacity or the other. The oldest son became an employee of the Basel Mission Trading Company while her two younger sons went to the Basel Mission Seminary in Switzerland and were consecrated as Pietist priests. They both married German women and lived in Württemberg, Germany for the rest of their lives. Regina Hesse's two daughters, Bertha and Theodora both married German missionary-traders and were widowed shortly after their marriages. Bertha Rottmann's second marriage ended in divorce while her sister, Theodora was widowed again in 1895 after her second husband, Hermann Lieb passed away. Theodora Rottmann eventually relocated to Korntal, Germany. Thus, only Regina Hesse's eldest son lived on the Gold Coast for his entire professional career. Regina Hesse often went to Europe with her husband, Hermann Rottmann on his yearly furloughs. In 1897, the Hesse-Rottmann couple travelled to Basel to seek medical treatment for illness.

== Death and legacy ==
Regina Hesse died in 1898 in Basel, Switzerland. As an educator, she was both a teacher and a spiritual mentor to a generation of young Euro-African and Ga-Dangme women of Christiansborg and played a major role in increasing the female literacy rate in the town.
