= Radio Central =

Cape Coast; Ghana
- Broadcast area: Central region
- Frequency: 92.5 MHz,

Programming
- Languages: English, Fante
- Format: Local news, talk and music

Ownership
- Owner: Ghana Broadcasting Corporation

Radio Central is a public radio station in Cape Coast, the capital town of the Central of Ghana. The station is owned and run by the state broadcaster - the Ghana Broadcasting Corporation.
