= Mary Chinery-Hesse =

Ghanaian politician and university administrator

Mary Chinery-Hesse FAAS, OSG
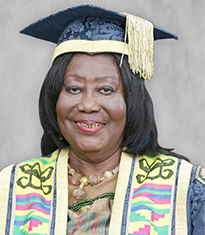

Chancellor of the University of Ghana
- Incumbent
- Assumed office 1 August 2018
- Preceded by: Kofi Annan

Personal details
- Born: Mary Blay; 29 October 1938 (age 87)
- Spouse: L.J. Chinery-Hesse
- Children: 3, including Herman Chinery-Hesse
- Parents: Robert Samuel Blay (father); Marjorie Lady Mould (mother)
- Education: Wesley Girls' High School; University of Ghana, Legon; Trinity College Dublin
- Occupation: International civil servant; Diplomat
- Known for: First woman Deputy Director-General, ILO; First woman Chancellor, University of Ghana
- Awards: Order of the Star of Ghana; Gusi Peace Prize

Mary Akuokor Chinery-Hesse, née Blay (born 29 October 1938) is an international civil servant and diplomat, serving as the first woman Chancellor of the University of Ghana, inducted on 1 August 2018. She was the first female Deputy Director-General of the International Labour Organization She was also the first woman to attain the rank of Under-Secretary-General of the United Nations .

== Early life and education ==
Mary Blay was born to Robert Samuel Blay, a barrister, jurist, and Justice of the Supreme Court of Ghana during the First Republic. Her mother was Marjorie Lady Mould of Jamestown, Accra. Her maternal great-grandfather was John van der Puije, the Gold Coast merchant, newspaper publisher, traditional ruler and politician. She had her secondary education at the Wesley Girls' Senior High School in Cape Coast. She also holds a BA (Hons) in Sociology and Economics and a Doctor of Laws (honoris causa) from the University of Ghana, and she did postgraduate training in Development Economics at Trinity College Dublin. At the World Bank Institute in Washington D.C., she was inscribed as a Fellow of the Institute.

== Career ==
In her early career, Mary Chinery-Hesse was a principal secretary at the Ministry of Finance and Economic Planning and secretary of the National Economic Planning Council. She joined the UN in 1981, where she held the appointment of the first African woman Resident Coordinator of the United Nations System and Resident Representative of UNDP to many countries, including Sierra Leone, Tanzania, the Seychelles, and Uganda. She headed the Consultative Committee on Programme and Operational Questions (CCPOQ) of the United Nations from 1993 to 1998, the Commonwealth Expert Group of Eminent Persons on Structural Adjustment and Women, and was instrumental in the published report, Engendering Adjustment. She belonged to the Council of African Advisers of the World Bank between 1992 and 1998. In the 1990s, she chaired the High-Level Panel of Eminent Persons on Review of Progress in the Implementation of the Programme for the Least Developed Countries. She was a member of the Eminent Persons’ Advisory Panel of the African Union and served on the Zedillo Commission, more formally known as the Distinguished High-Level Panel of Eminent Persons on Financing for Development.

In 1989, she was appointed as the first woman Deputy Director-General of the International Labour Organization in Geneva, Switzerland. She served as an advisor to John Kufour, the former President of Ghana. She was the vice chairman of the National Development Planning Commission.

She has served on several boards, including those at the Centre for Policy Analysis and the Voluntary Fund for Technical Cooperation of the UN High Commissioner for Human Rights. She was also a Commissioner at the Public Utilities Regulatory Commission and at the Commission on HIV/AIDS and Governance in Africa.

She was appointed Chancellor of the University of Ghana succeeding Kofi Annan, former UN Secretary-General. She assumed this position on 1 August 2018 and served for the first 5-year term. She was reappointed in July 2023 and is currently serving a second term which commenced on 1 August 2023 and would conclude 31 July 2028.

She serves as the Chair of the Goodwill Ambassadors of the Kofi Annan International Peacekeeping Training Centre and is also the Chair of the Board of the Centre for Regional Integration in Africa.

== Chinery-Hesse Committee ==
She was commissioned by the erstwhile Government of former President John Kufour to determine the end-of-service benefits and emoluments of Article 71 officer holders.

== Personal life ==
She was married to Lebrecht James Chinery-Hesse (1930–2018), a Ghanaian lawyer and former principal state attorney who had done international stints in Sierra Leone, Zambia, and Uganda and was awarded the Grand Medal by the Ghanaian government. Their son, Herman Chinery-Hesse, was a software entrepreneur.

== Works ==
- Chinnery-Hesse, Mary et al. (1989), "Engendering adjustment for the 1990s : report of a Commonwealth expert group on women and structural adjustment" London: Commonwealth Secretariat

== Legacy ==
From 2010 to 2013, she was a member of the Panel of the Wise, a consultative body of the African Union for West Africa and the board chairman for Zenith Bank, Ghana.

She was the first African woman to become an Undersecretary-General of the United Nations and the first to become a UN Resident Coordinator.

== Awards and recognition ==
Chinery-Hesse received the highest national award in Ghana the Order of the Star of Ghana. She was also awarded the Gusi Peace Prize for International Diplomacy and Humanitarianism in Manila, Philippines, on 24 November 2010. In 1991, the University of Ghana bestowed an Honorary Doctor of Law degree upon Chinery-Hesse, making her the first female graduate of the University of Ghana to receive this prestigious honor. In November 2021 she was awarded an Honorary Doctorate by the University of London for her contributions to public service.

Chinery-Hesse launched the Council on Foreign Relations-Ghana (CFR-Ghana) Memoirs Project Fund.
