= P.A.V. Ansah =

Ghanaian freedom fighter

- Born: Paul Archibald Vianney Ansah; 20 February 1938
- Died: 1993 (aged 54–55)
- Other names: PAVA; PAV
- Occupation: Freedom fighter

Paul Archibald Vianney Ansah (20 February 1938 – 14 June 1993), popularly called P.A.V. Ansah, was a Ghanaian freedom fighter. He was once described as "the uncaged bird in Ghana's politics", at a time when press freedom was denied. He was affectionately called PAVA.

He is specifically credited with setting the tone for the study and practice of mass communications in Ghana.

Ansah died on 14 June 1993.

A collection of Ansah's writings between 1991 and 1993, comprising articles published in his column in the Ghanaian Chronicle, together with his contributions to other publications, was published in 2013 with the title Going to Town: The Writings of P.A.V. Ansah, edited by Professors Kwesi Yankah, Kwame Karikari and Audrey Gadzekpo.

== Legacy ==
The Ghana Journalists Association has honoured him at their annual awards meant to recognize extraordinary work as the best journalist in the country. EMY Africa has also named the best communicator award after PAV Ansah.

== Publication ==
- Kwame Nkrumah and the Mass Media
- Going to Town: The Writings of P.A.V. Ansah
