= Volta Star =

Volta Star Radio
- Ho; Ghana
- Broadcast area: Volta Region
- Frequency: 91.5 MHz

Programming
- Languages: English, French, Ewe
- Format: Local news, talk and music

Ownership
- Owner: Ghana Broadcasting Corporation

Volta Star FM is a public radio station in Ho, the capital town of the Volta Region of Ghana. The station is owned and run by the state broadcaster - the Ghana Broadcasting Corporation.

== Notable Presenters ==
- Kwame Senyo
- Eric Eli Adzie
- Tilda Acorlor
- King Freeman Xorlali Ntsukpui
- Togbe Akwensi
- Kofi Appoh
