= Robert Samuel Blay =

Ghanaian barrister and jurist

Robert Samuel Blay JSC

Justice of the Supreme Court of Ghana
- In office 1962–1964
- Appointed by: Kwame Nkrumah

Personal details
- Born: Robert Samuel Blay; April 8, 1901 Esiama, Gold Coast
- Died: 5 December 1979 (aged 78) Sekondi, Ghana
- Spouse: Dinah Blay
- Children: 16, including Mary
- Occupation: Barrister; Judge

Robert Samuel Blay, JSC was a Ghanaian barrister and judge. He was a Justice of the Supreme Court of Ghana during the First Republic. He is often referred to as the first Nzema lawyer. He was president of the Ghana Bar Association on two occasions and also a member of the first board of directors of the Bank of Ghana.

== Early life and education ==
Robert was born in April 1901 at Esiama in the Western Region of Ghana. He had his early education at the Tarkwa Methodist School in Tarkwa. He entered the Government Training Institution (was later merged with Achimota College) to train as a teacher. In 1920 he left for the United Kingdom to study law. He was called to the bar in June, 1926. As a student at the University of London Robert was actively involved in student politics. He occupied positions in various student groups. He was once president of the Union of Students of African Descent, a group that accepted nationals from the Caribbean and African colonies. He also served as an executive member of the West African Students Union. While in London he brought up the idea of the formation of the then Gold Coast Students Union.

== Career and politics ==
Robert taught for about three years at Tarkwa Methodist School after his teacher training. Upon his return to Ghana in 1926, Robert joined the Aborigines Rights Protection Society. He later became a founding member and the first Vice-Chairman of the United Gold Coast Convention, he was the third founding member. In 1958 he together with three Ghanaians and three Britons were appointed by the then prime minister; Dr. Kwame Nkrumah to constitute the first board of the Bank of Ghana. He represented Sekondi at the legislative council as its municipal member.

Aside politics and civil service, Robert was a known legal practitioner in Sekondi. He founded the Nzema Chambers in 1926 (which later became known as Blay and Associates). He was president of the Ghana Bar Association on two occasions. He became the first president of the Ghana Bar Association when he was appointed the association's president in 1957. He served as president of the association until 1959. He was succeeded by Archie Casely-Hayford. In 1960 he took office as the association's president once more, he served in that position until 1962. His fame in private practice led to his appointment as Supreme Court Judge by the then president, Kwame Nkrumah in 1962. He was dismissed together with Kofi Adumua Bossman and Edward Akufo-Addo on 2 March 1964 by the then president of Ghana; Kwame Nkrumah for protesting the dismissal of Sir. Kobina Arku Korsah and William Bedford Van Lare following the acquittal of Tawia Adamafio and others of treason charges. In 1969, he was a speaker of the constituent assembly, which drew the constitution of the second republic. Following the outcome of the 1978 Ghanaian governmental referendum he risked detention that year by filing writs of habeas corpus at the Sekondi High Court, that is; he demanded that the Supreme Military Council bring B. J. Da Rocha and K. A. Gbedemah to court and show valid reasons for their detention.

== Personal life ==
He was married to Dinah Blay of Cape Coast. He was the father of the Ghanaian international civil servant, diplomat and the first female chancellor of the University of Ghana, Mary Chinery-Hesse, and Dr. Mokowa Blay Adu-Gyamfi, former High Commissioner of Ghana to Sierra Leone and former Director General of Ghana Aids Commission. He was the father of the first female Director General of Ghana Education Service, Very Rev. Ama Afo Blay of the Methodist Church.

== Death ==
He died on 5 December 1979 at Sekondi. He was buried at his hometown; Esiama on 22 December 1979.

== See also ==
- List of judges of the Supreme Court of Ghana
- Supreme Court of Ghana
