= Ahanta West (Ghana parliament constituency) =

Ghana parliament constituency

- constituency for the Parliament of Ghana
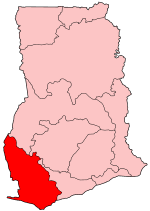
- District: Ahanta West District
- Region: Western Region of Ghana

Current constituency
- Party: National Democratic Congress
- MP: Mavis Kuukua Bissue

Ahanta West is one of the constituencies represented in the Parliament of Ghana. It elects one Member of Parliament (MP) by the first past the post system of election. Ahanta West is located in the Ahanta West Municipal District of the Western Region of Ghana. Mavis Kuukua Bissue is the member of parliament for the constituency. She was elected on the ticket of the National Democratic Congress (NDC) and won a majority.

== See also ==
- List of Ghana Parliament constituencies
