= Ghana Broadcasting Corporation =

Ghanaian public service broadcaster

Ghana Broadcasting Corporation (GBC)
- Type: Terrestrial television and radio broadcast network
- Industry: Mass Media
- Predecessor: Gold Coast Broadcasting System-31 July 1935; 91 years ago
- Founded: 1 January 1953; 73 years ago
- Headquarters: Accra, Ghana
- Area served: Ghana, 16 regions
- Key people: Professor Amin Alhassan (Director General)
- Products: Broadcasting, radio, web portals
- Services: Television, radio, online
- Owner: Government of Ghana
- Parent: Government of Ghana
- Website: gbcghanaonline.com

The Ghana Broadcasting Corporation (GBC) was established by law in 1968 with a triple mandate as a State Broadcaster, Public Service Broadcaster, and a Commercial Broadcaster in Ghana. Headquartered in the capital city, Accra, GBC is funded by grants, broadcasting television commercials and the levying of a television licence, costing 36 cedis and 60 cedis for one or more TV sets in the same house every year. TV set repairers and sales outlets are to pay an annual sum of between 60 cedis to 240 cedis.

== History ==
Established under an act by the British colonial government in 1935, the Gold Coast first operated a broadcasting outlet called Station ZOY, a relay station operated by the BBC. It later became the Ghana Broadcasting Corporation after Kwame Nkrumah changed the name Gold Coast to Ghana, upon political independence in 1957.

Broadcasting began on 31 July 1935, from a wired relay station opened in Accra. The brain behind the introduction of broadcasting into the country was the then Governor of the Gold Coast, Arnold Hodson. He was assisted by a British radio engineer, F. A. W. Byron. Gramophone records of martial and light music were relayed, and Hodson spoke the message:

One of the main reasons for introducing the Relay Service is to bring news, entertainment and music into the homes of all and sundry. This will bring to an end the barriers of isolation and ignorance in the path of progress and also to enable the people of Gold Coast to improve on their very rich cultural music.

In 1965, Kwame Nkrumah inaugurated the television division for black and white screens. Both radio and television became main components of GBC's electronic outlets for information dissemination. In 1996, the Supreme Court settled a key debate in Ghana when its ruling committed the state broadcaster to the equal opportunities doctrine in broadcasting. Thus, the corporation is obliged to be fair and grant equal publicity to all political parties in Ghana. Over time, it expanded to meet increasing expectations occasioned by population growth. As a result, the station now operates seven television channels and thirty-three radio frequencies which broadcast in twenty-five languages.

== Administration ==
The new broadcasting Service was staffed by eight technicians and housed in a small bungalow on 9th Road near the Ridge Police Station in Accra. Broadcasting first began in four Ghanaian languages, Fanti, Twi, Ga, Ewe, and later Hausa. Part-time staff were engaged to translate and announce the news in these languages until 1943 when full-time staff were appointed. Between 1946 and 1953, the organisation was administered by the Public Relation Department, now the Information Services Department.

The Director-Generals of the GBC were:

- J. B. Millar, 1954–1960
- W. F. Coleman, 1960–1970
- S. B. Mfodwo, 1970–1972
- L. W. Fifi Hesse, 1972–1975 & 1984–1990
- J. Y. Assasie, 1975–1981
- Kwame Karikari, 1982–1984
- George Aryee, 1991–1992
- David Anaglate, 1992–1995
- Kofi Frimpong, 1995–1999
- Gilbert Adanusa, 1999–2000 (acting)
- Seth Ago-Adjetey, 2000–1902
- Eva Lokko, 2002–1905
- Yaw Owusu Addo, 2005–1907 (acting)
- William Ampem-Darko, 2007–1910
- Kwabena Sarpong-Anane, November 2010–October 2011 (acting)
- Berifi Afari Apenteng, November 2011–March 2013
- Albert Don-Chebe, May 2013 - May 2016
- Kwame Akuffo Anoff-Ntow, November 2016 -January 2018
- Amin Alhassan, October 1, 2019–Present

== Legislation ==
On the recommendation of a commission set up in 1953, the Gold Coast Broadcasting Service (GCBS) was established and from there it became a department in its own right. On attainment of independence in 1957, the Gold Coast was renamed Ghana and the GCBS became Ghana Broadcasting System (GBS). The legislation that set up GBC as an establishment was National Liberation Council Degree number 226 (NLCD266) of 1968.

== Television and radio stations ==
GBC operates Ghana Television GTV (a channel for events that matter most to Ghanaians), which is broadcast nationwide on analogue terrestrial platform. Additionally, GBC runs four digital networks: GTV Sports+ (24-hour sports channel that provides premium sports programmes), GBC News (24-hour news and current affairs channel), GTV Life (Religious and cultural channel), and Obonu TV (a channel for the people of Greater Accra and window for the Ga-Dangbe). It has branches or affiliate stations across the regional capitals, partnered with other private and Public Service Broadcasters across the globe, and collaborating with other governments worldwide.

The mandate of GBC requires that it provides services for all segments of the multicultural society, with the cardinal roles being timely information, education and entertainment. It quickly set up the GTV Learning channel to broadcast to school pupils and students forced to stay home as the academic calendar was suspended at onset of the novel Coronavirus pandemic from March 2020. New cards on the table are the plans to establish radio stations in the six newly created regions in Ghana.

Regional FM stations nationwide:

- Uniiq FM
- Volta Star
- Twin City Radio
- Radio Central
- Radio Savannah
- Garden City Radio
- URA Radio
- Radio Upper West
- Sunrise FM
- Obonu FM
- Radio BAR

== Training school ==
The Ghana Broadcasting Corporation, which is also an agency overseen by the Ministry of Information, runs a training school that provides education in radio and TV broadcasting and engineering. The training school has two faculties: Broadcast Journalism and Broadcast Technology. The corporation also promotes training and educational programs and is central to fulfilling the GBC's mission to inform, educate and entertain.

== Timeline ==
Year	Event
1935	Radio ZOY Established (BH-1)
1939-1940	British Government built BH-2 (now known as Old House)
1943	Local Languages broadcast introduced
1946	Information Service Department handled Administration of GBC
1953	Gold Coast Broadcasting System Established as a Department
1955	Establishment of Engineering Training School
1956	Audience Research Department set up
1956	GBC News unit set up
1958	Broadcasting House (BH-3) built
1960	Mr W. F. Coleman appointed first Ghanaian director-general
1961	External Service
1962	GBC Reference Library established
1965	GTV inaugurated
1965	Rural Broadcasting introduced
1966	Television Licensing Decree, N.L.C.D 89
1967	Commercial Broadcasting introduced
1971	Public Relations Department set up
1975	Ghana Broadcasting Corporation (Amendment) Decree, N.R.C.D 334
1985	Colour Television Introduced
1985	URA Radio established
1986	Accra FM Radio established
1987	Apam fm station commissioned
1989	Installation of satellite TV dish to receive CNN
1991	Television Licensing Regulations, LI 1520
1994	Dormaa Ahenkro Community station commissioned
1994	Twin-city radio commissioned
1995	Radio GAR now Uniiq Fm goes stereo
1995	Radio Savanna commissioned
1996	Radio Central commissioned
1996	Radio Volta Star commissioned
1997	Installation of satellite TV dish to receive Deutsche Welle
1997	Installation of satellite TV dish to receive Worldnet
1998	Installation of satellite TV dish to receive CFI
2001	Radio BAR commissioned
2001	Radio Upper West commissioned
2002	Radio GAR re-commissioned to Uniiq FM
2002	Radio Obonu FM commissioned
2002	Radio Sunrise FM commissioned
2010	Pilot Digital Terrestrial Transmission DTT(MPEG2, DVB-T)started
2010	DDT Committee Inaugurated
2010	Upgrading and Expansion of DTT (MPEG2, DVB-T)to Greater Accra, parts of Central, Eastern and Ashanti Regions
2010	GBC marks Diamond Jubilee
2010	GTV Sports (All Sports Digital Channel) established
2011	GBC24 (24 hour News Digital Channel) established
2011	Obonu Fm marks 10th Anniversary
2011	GBC Life (All Life Digital Channel) established
2014	GTV Govern Digital Channel Established
2014	Obonu TV Digital Channel Established
2014	GBC Digital Set Top Boxes Launched
2015	GBC celebrates 80th Anniversary
2015	TV Licence Fee revised from 30p to 36 Ghana Cedis a year
