= National Media Commission =

Ghanaian government ministry

Agency overview
- Jurisdiction: Government of Ghana
- Headquarters: Accra
- Agency executive: Mr Yaw Boadu-Ayeboafoh, Chairman

Ghana has a pluralistic and free media environment with an independent statutory media regulatory body, which is the National Media Commission. The National Media Commission was set up on July 7, 1993, by an act of the Parliament of the Republic of Ghana (Act 449) in accordance with Chapter 12 of the 1992 Constitution (National Media Commission Act,1993). The commission was set up to promote and safeguard the freedom and independence of the media, encourage responsible practice and investigate, mediate and settle complaints made against the media. The National Mass Media Commission is a Government of Ghana agency mandated with the responsibility of registering, regulating and monitoring the activities of media houses in Ghana.The current chairman of the commission is Mr Yaw Boadu-Ayeboafoh. Adding to the National Media Commission members are also; Messes Patrick Boamah and Anyimadu Antwi, representing Parliament; Mrs Comfort Asare, Ghana Library Association, and Messrs Bright Blewu and Affail Monney, Ghana Journalists Association. The National Media Commission (NMC) is made up of fifteen (15)members drawn from a broad spectrum of the media, and other professional stakeholder groupings under Article 166 (1) & Section 5 of the 1992 constitution.

== Overview ==
The National Media Commission was set on July 7, 1993, by an Act of Parliament:

Act 1993, Act 449, in pursuit of the provisions of Chapter 12 of Ghana's 1992 Constitution is enjoined among others taking all measures to ensure the establishment and maintenance of the highest journalistic standards in mass media, including investigation, mediation, and settlement of complaints made against or by the press or other mass media.

== See also ==
- Ghana Library Association
- Ghana Bar Association
- Constitution of Ghana
