= Michael Osei =

Michael Osei may refer to:

- Michael Kwasi Osei, Ghanaian politician
- Michael Osei (footballer, born 1971), Ghanaian footballer and coach
- Michael Osei (footballer, born 1982)
- Michael Osei (footballer, born 2004)
