= Spoken word in Ghana =

Spoken word in Ghana begun to see growth in Ghana from 2010 through Bless The Mic and Ehalakasa.

== History ==
As is the case in the global spoken word space, in Ghana, this art form is considerably more than a means of entertainment or individual self-expression. Established and emerging players in the country continually use spoken word as a channel to bring awareness to issues across all aspects of Ghanaian life.

The poetry group Ehalakasa, led by Sir Black, holds monthly TalkParty events (collaborative endeavour with Nubuke Foundation and/ National Theatre of Ghana) and special events such as the Ehalakasa Slam Festival and end-of-year events. This group has produced spoken-word poets including Mutombo da Poet, Chief Moomen, Nana Asaase, Rhyme Sonny, Koo Kumi, Hondred Percent, Jewel King, Faiba Bernard, Akambo, Wordrite, Natty Ogli, and Philipa, Megborna.

The spoken word poets in Ghana are improving spoken word by combining it with 3D animations and spoken word video game

In Kumasi, the creative group CHASKELE holds an annual spoken word event on the campus of KNUST giving platform to poets and other creatives. Poets like Elidior The Poet, Slimo, T-Maine are key members of this group.

== See also ==
- Greek lyric
- Griot
- Haikai prose
- Hip hop
- List of performance poets
- Nuyorican Poets Café
- Oral poetry
- Performance poetry
- Poetry reading
- Prose rhythm
- Prosimetrum
- Purple prose
- Rapping
- Recitative
- Rhymed prose
- Slam poetry
- Spoken word
