= Ethel Adjorlolo Marfo =

Ghanaian male rights advocate

- Other names: BoysDocta_Ethel
- Education: University of Education, Winneba (M.Ed.)
- Occupations: Male rights advocate, educator, social entrepreneur
- Known for: Founder of Junior Shapers Africa (JSA)
- Awards: CIMG Special President's Award (2017)

Ethel Adjorlolo Marfo (also known as BoysDocta_Ethel) is a Ghanaian male rights advocate, educator and social entrepreneur. She is the founder and advocacy lead of Junior Shapers Africa (JSA), a non-profit organization for the development of males. She is Africa's first male child development activist.

== Education ==
Marfo graduated with a master's degree in Educational Leadership and Innovation at the University of Education, Winneba.

== Career ==
Marfo established the Junior Shapers Africa (JSA) on 21 September 2015 to help in the empowerment of young males in Ghana, Africa, the UK, the US and Thailand. She also founded Salon Cuties and Ghana Mompreneurs Club. She has also worked as Public Relations and Marketer for Guinness Ghana Breweries Ltd, Aviation Social Center Ltd and The Spelling Bee Ghana.

== Awards and recognitions ==
In September 2017, Marfo received an award from CIMG at the 28th edition of the Institute's National Performance Awards in Accra. She was honored because of her service to raising vulnerable young males in schools and communities.

She was also named among the Top 100 Most Inspirational Women of the Year by Glitz Magazine.

- 2021: Appointed As Faculty Member of The Prestigious EMY Africa Awards in Ghana (Exclusive Men of The Year)
- 2021: Recognised Celebrant of World Day of the Annual World of The Boy Child Celebration originated in Trinidad & Tobago
- 2019: Listed in 100 Inspirational Women in Ghana by Glitz Africa
- 2018: Member of the Counselling and Guidance team for Mary Mother of Good Counsel School (Accra, Ghana)
- 2018: Marfo received the Value Added Education Award by Educom Awards, Ghana
- 2017: Listed in 10 inspiring mompreneurs in Africa by wetracker.com based in South Africa
- 2017: CIMG Special President's Award Recipient (Acca, Ghana)
- 2016: Listed in 100 Influential women in Ghana by Womanrising.com

== Personal life ==
Marfo is married with three daughters.
