= Nathaniel Attoh =

Ghanaian announcer and journalist

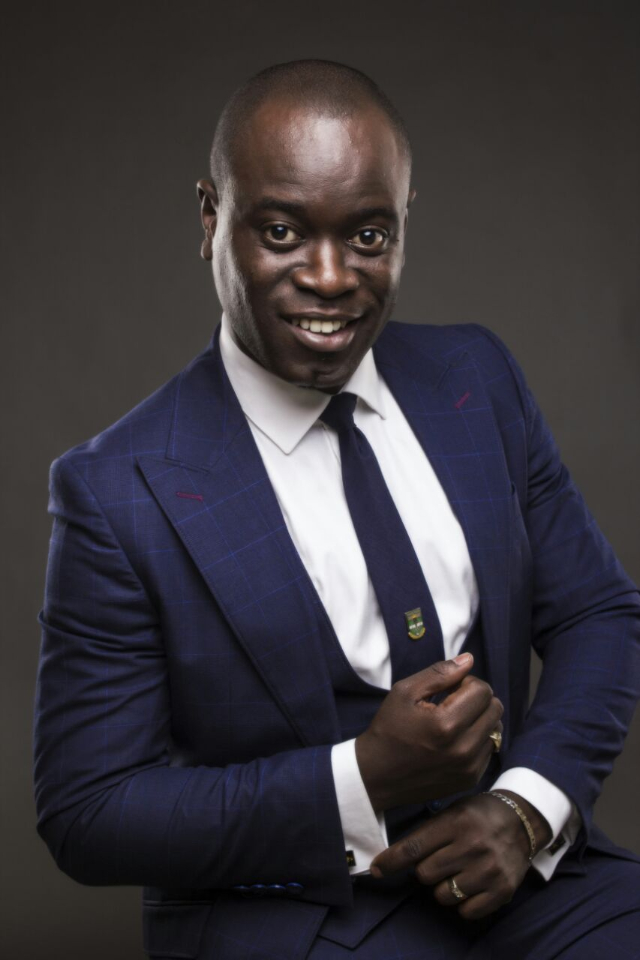
- Born: 11 March 1983 (age 43); Accra, Ghana
- Other name: Citizen Attoh
- Education: Ridge Church School; St. Augustine's College; Ghana Institute of Journalism; African University College of Communications
- Occupations: Master of ceremonies, ring announcer, TV and radio journalist
- Years active: 2003–present
- Notable credits: Joy Sports Link Host
- Spouse: Emelia Asiedu Attoh
- Children: 2

Nathaniel Attoh, also known as Citizen Attoh, (born 11 March 1983), is a Ghanaian professional master of ceremonies (mc), international boxing ring announcer, and television and radio journalist. He is known for the radio show "Joy Sports Link" on Joy 99.7 FM (the flagship brand of the Multimedia Group Limited) Ghana.

== Early life and education ==
The son of a physician, Attoh was born in Accra, Ghana. He was educated at Ridge Church School in Accra, followed by St. Augustine's College in Cape Coast, Ghana.

He received a diploma in communication studies from the African University College of Communications (then Africa Institute of Journalism and Communications) between 2003 and 2005. He later enrolled at the Ghana Institute of Journalism (GIJ), where he completed a Bachelor of Arts degree in communication studies (PR option).

== Broadcast career ==
Attoh started his journalism career with the Graphic Communications Group, where he reported for the Graphic Sports Newspaper. After 5 years, he joined the Multimedia Group (Ghana) in April 2009 as a Broadcast Journalist (Sports).

He was promoted to senior broadcast journalist and eventually editor of Joy Sports. He moved beyond sports, and presented some entertainment and lifestyle shows (Entertainment News on Drive Time on Joy FM and also "Autograph on the Joy Prime Channel on Multi TV"). He is the host of "Sports Today" on the Joy News Channel on Multi TV Ghana. He has also anchored the African Cup of Nations Broadcast, the Football Show and the English Premier league Broadcast, all on Multi TV Ghana.

== Personal life ==
Attoh married Accra-based lawyer Emelia Asiedu Attoh in July 2014; they have two children.

== Events hosted ==
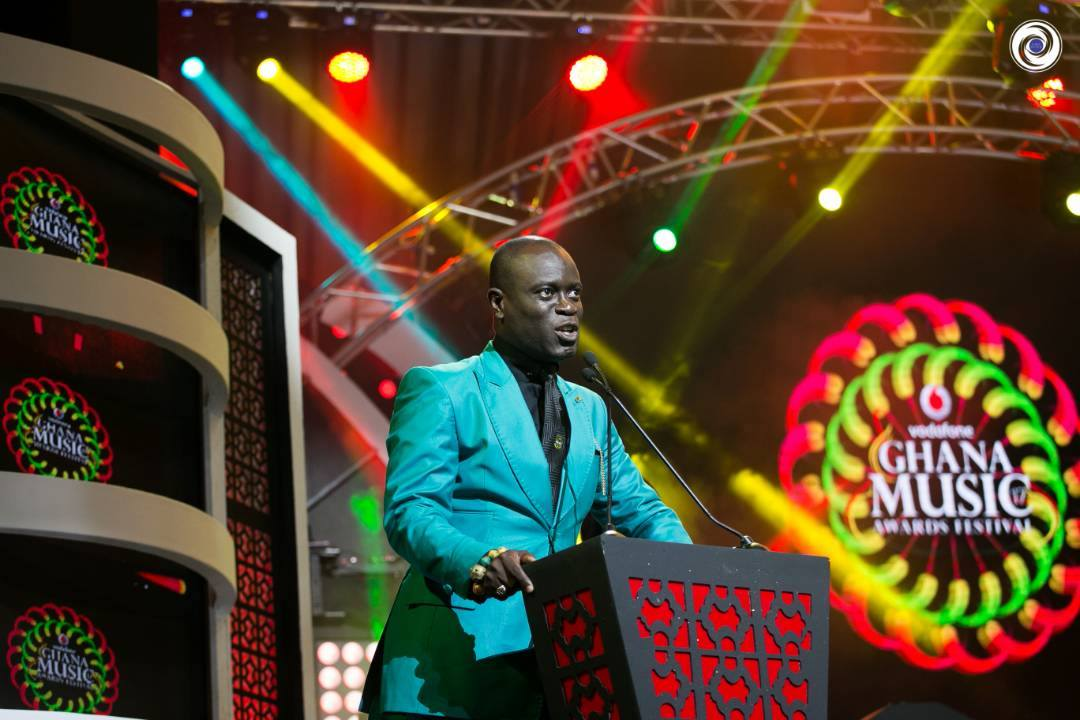
Nathaniel Attoh about to present the award for Reggae/Dancehall song of the year at the Vodafone Ghana Music Awards VGMA's 2017 at the Accra International Conference Centre

- Vodafone Ghana Music Awards 2015 Edition.
- Guinness Football Challenge Ghana (Seasons I, II and III)
- Rhythms On Da Runway.
- Miss Universe Ghana
- Host, The Rhythms on DA Runway event, 2017.
- Host Miss Universe Ghana, 2018.
- Co host Rhythms on Da Runway.
- Hosted The Spelling Bee Ghana, 2017,2020.

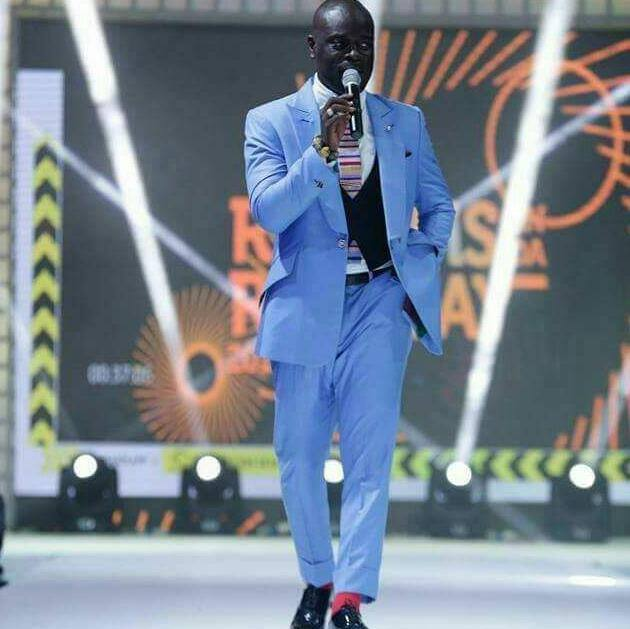
Nathaniel Attoh hosting the 2017 edition of the Rhythmz On the Runway fashion show

== Achievements and nominations ==
- Awarded, 2018 Glitz Africa Style Awards Media Personality of the year.
- Special award for contributions to Creative Arts Industry, 'Rhythms On Da Runway’ 2022.

== Modelling ==
His first experience on the runway was at the 2018 edition of the Joy Beauty and Bridal Fair, where he modeled suits and traditional marriage outfits and later at the 2019 Glitz Africa Fashion Week, in a design put together by Jay Ray Ghartey.

== Boxing announcer ==
He has announced two International Boxing Organization World Title fights: Joseph Agbeko VS Luis Melendez and a WBC World Youth World Title between Isaac Dogboe and John Neil Tabanao of the Philippines. He was the ring announcer for the Judgement Day Bout between Ghana's Bukom Banku and Ayittey Powers, which was telecast on DSTV Super Sports to over 30 African countries.

Attoh was the MC for the opening of the Bukom Boxing Arena of the Trust Sports Emporium.

== Acting ==
Nathaniel Attoh made his first appearance on Shirley Frimpong-Manso's television series Dede. Dede follows the story of a teenage girl from a rural area who is misled by her stepmother to leave her family and work as a house help in a wealthy household with many challenges.
