= Nana Araba Apt =

Ghanaian author, educator, and social worker

Personal details
- Born: Agnes Eva Ashun
- Children: Rawia Liverpool (née Shalabi)

Nana Araba Apt (1942 – 2017) was a gerontologist, researcher, author and advocate of social work education in Ghana.

She was a professor in Sociology and Social Work and founder and director of Centre for Social Policy Studies at the University of Ghana, Legon. She was also the founder of HelpAge Ghana (part of HelpAge International), the first aging advocacy organisation of its kind in Ghana and a founding member and past president of the African Gerontological Society.

Professor Apt's life-long passion began with concern for street children. This then expanded to the lack of education opportunities for girls in rural parts of Ghana. She was one of the three founders of 'College for Ama (CoFA)' in 2005, a charitable foundation that ran annual summer camps for girls to challenge them to understand the value of education and delay marriage.

After retiring from University of Ghana, Professor Apt was the founding Dean of Academic Affairs at Ashesi University.

== Early life and education ==
Nana Araba Apt (1942–2017) was born as Agness Eva Ashun in Shama, Western Ghana. She attended Holy Child School in Cape Coast.

She earned an undergraduate degree in Psychology, English and Philosophy from Queen's University, Canada in 1965; a Master's degree in Social Work from the University of Toronto in 1967; and a doctorate in Sociology from the University of Ghana in 1989.

== Bibliography ==
- Coping with Old Age in a Changing Africa: Social Change and the Elderly Ghanaian (1996)
- Learning How to Play to Win (2007)
- Positioning Ghana: Challenges and Innovations (2015)
