= Yao Tettey =

Ghanaian academic and physician

Yao Tettey FRCP, FWACP, FGCP
- Born: Yao Tettey; Ghana
- Occupation: Academic

Academic background
- Education: University of Ghana; Royal Postgraduate Medical School, University of London

Academic work
- Institutions: West African Postgraduate Medical College; University of Ghana

Yao Tettey FRCP, FWACP, FGCP is a Ghanaian academic and physician. He is a professor of Pathology at the University of Ghana, and the provost of the university's College of Health Sciences. He also works as a Consultant Pathologist at the Korle-bu Teaching Hospital. He is a fellow of the Royal College of Physicians, the Ghana College of Physicians, and the West African College of Physicians, of which he served as president from 2013 to 2014.

== Education ==
Tettey obtained his M.B, Ch.B in May 1982 from the University of Ghana. In September 1992, he was awarded his diploma in Clinical Pathology (DCP) from the Royal Postgraduate Medical School, University of London.

== Career ==
In October 1994, Tettey worked at the Faculty of Laboratory Medicine of the West African Postgraduate Medical College. He was a foundation fellow of the Ghana College of Physicians in 2003, and president of the West African College of Physicians from 2013 to 2014. He is the provost of the University of Ghana's College of Health Sciences. He once served on the Ghana Food and Drugs Board's Technical Advisory Committee on Safety and Monitoring.
