= St. Augustine's College (Cape Coast) =

Public secondary/high school in Cape Coast, Ghana

Coordinates: 5°6′13″N 1°16′48″W

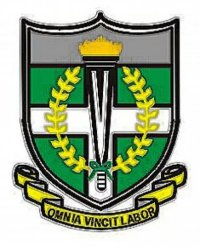
- The College, Coat of Arms animals of a shield with a white cross on a green field. The lit torch is flanked by a laurel that is represented by yellow olive branches. The grey colour- a combination of white and black – signifies the combined efforts of the society of African Missionary (SAM) Fathers (whites) and African faithful in propagating the gospel.

Location
- P. O. Box 98; Old Elmina Road; Cape Coast; Ghana

Information
- Type: Public secondary/high school
- Motto: Omnia Vincit Labor (Perseverance conquers All)
- Established: 1930; 96 years ago
- Headmaster: Rev.Fr. Patrick Godfred Appiah (PhD)
- Enrollment: 2000
- Colors: Green and white
- Athletics: Track and field
- Mascot: Hippo
- Nickname: Augusco
- Rivals: Mfantsipim School
- Affiliations: Roman Catholic
- Alumni: St. Augustine's Past Students Union
- Website: www.auguscocapecoast.edu.gh

St. Augustine’s College is a Catholic, all-male boarding academic institution in Cape Coast, Ghana. As the first catholic school established in Ghana, the school started at Amissano, a village near Elmina, in 1930. The Catholic institution was established to serve as a training college and seminary. The school was named after St. Augustine of Hippo (354 – 430 AD). The motto of the college is Omnia Vincit Labor, meaning "Perseverance conquers All". The school has a total of 12 houses.

== History ==
On 6 August 1933, Archbishop William Porter of Cape Coast felt the need for a local Catholic school and Cape Coast was found to be the most suitable location.. A commemorative foundation stone was laid in late 1935 at the present site. Fr. Maurice B. Kelly, the Dean of the Training College at Amissano which is now St. Teresa’s Seminary, Amisano, became the first Head Dean or Headmaster.

== Culture ==
St. Augustine’s College, popularly known as "AUGUSCO", calls its old students "APSUnians"

Due to the historical association and their common catholic antecedents, there is a tendency for Holy Child High School, Ghana old students (HOPSA) and St. Augustine’s old students (APSUnians) to get married. The church believes marriage between old students of the two schools will perpetuate the Catholic traditions.

== Student body ==
The students are among the highest performing in the WAEC exams

St. Augustine's College are two time winners of the National Science and Mathematics Quiz. Winners in 2007 and 2019. In the 2007 edition of the National Science and Mathematics Quiz the college won, and two out of the school's three contestants represented Ghana. Team three won the West African Science and Mathematics Quizzes.

== Participation in inter schools competitions ==
The college won the finals of the 2019 edition of the Ghana National Science and Maths Quiz. This was the second time the college had emerged winners of the competition, after having won it for the first time in 2007. Also in 2007, St. Augustine's College won the first and only edition of the West African Science and Math Quiz competition.

In 2019, the College won its second National Science and Maths trophy, exactly twelve years after winning its maiden one. To date, the College has the record of being the only school which has won the title each time it got to the grand finale.

The College also won the 2016 edition of the Sprite Ball Championship. In 2014, the College claimed the top prize at the first-ever Unicbet National Business Quiz. Jointly organized by Unicbet Limited and the Ghana Association of Business Education Teachers (GABET), the competition served as a platform for Business students throughout the Central Region to showcase and measure their academic abilities against their peers.

St. Augustine's college is set to appear in the 2025 Ghana National Science and Maths Quiz grand finale, where they will compete with defending champions Mfantsipim School and two time champions, Opoku Ware School at the SGS Auditorium, University of Cape Coast on Thursday November 6, 2025.

== Education ==
=== NSMQ 2025 ===
St. Augustine’s College (AUGUSCO) was the champion of the National Science and Maths Quiz (NSMQ) in 2007 and 2019. The school secured its place in what promises to be an electrifying grand finale of the 2025 National Science and Maths Quiz.

== Notable alumni ==
- P. A. K. Aboagye, Ghanaian poet, essayist, novelist, and historian.
- J. H. Owusu Acheampong, Ghanaian politician and member of parliament in the fourth republic
- Paul Acquah, former governor of the Bank of Ghana.
- A. K. Adu, a former diplomat
- William Kwabena Aduhene, Ghanaian politician, member of parliament in the first republic
- Kwaku Afriyie, Ghanaian politician
- Junior Agogo, former international soccer player
- Kwame Poku Agyekum, Ghanaian politician, member of parliament in the second republic
- Kwesi Ahwoi, a Ghanaian politician
- William Owuraku Aidoo, Ghanaian politician and member of parliament in the fourth republic
- Kabral Blay Amihere, a Ghanaian journalist
- Odeefuo Boa Amponsem III, 18th traditional ruler of Denkyira (Denkyirahene)
- Kenneth Andam, retired Ghanaian sprinter
- Samuel Kobina Annim, Government Statistician and former Associate Professor of Economics.
- Anane Antwi-Kusi, Ghanaian politician, and member of parliament in the second republic.
- Nana Asaase a literary coach and writer.
- Nathaniel Attoh, a radio journalist, master of ceremonies and ring announcer.
- Sammi Awuku, a Ghanaian politician and currently the National Organizer of the New Patriotic Party.
- Kofi Baako, a politician and minister in the Nkrumah government
- Joseph Kingsley Baffour-Senkyire, Ghanaian academic, politician and diplomat; member of parliament in the first republic and formerly Ghana's ambassador to the United States of America
- Joseph Kenneth Bandoh, physician; president of the West African College of Physicians (1993-1994)
- John Bilson, medical doctor and politician
- Ben Brako, leading Ghanaian Highlife Star;
- Kwesi Botchwey, Minister for Finance and Economic Planning (1982-1995)
- Albert Don-Chebe, Director General of the Ghana Broadcasting Corporation (2013-2016)
- Amu Djoleto, a Ghanaian novelist.
- John Bogolo Erzuah, a former diplomat and a politician; minister in the Nkrumah government
- Michael Essien, international football star;
- Kwame Gyawu-Kyem, Ghanaian politician and member of parliament in the fourth republic
- George Hagan (politician), a Ghanaian politician
- Kwame Sanaa-Poku Jantuah, a politician in the first and third republic
- Joseph Kodzo, a politician in the first republic
- George Kingsley Koomson, Justice of the Supreme Court of Ghana
- Bashiru Kwaw-Swanzy, a former attorney general of the first republic
- Nana Amaniampong Marfo, member of parliament in the fourth republic
- Fred McBagonluri, engineer, inventor, novelist and academic, President of Academic City University
- Paa Kwesi Nduom, former minister of Ghana, former member of parliament and entrepreneur;
- Paul Kwame Nkegbe, soldier, politician, and Minister of state in the Supreme Military Council (SMC) government
- Victoria Nyarko, Ghanaian politician, member of parliament in the first republic
- Tawia Modibo Ocran, a Ghanaian jurist; former supreme court judge of Ghana.
- Jonathan Tetteh Ofei, a politician and former member of parliament during the second republic
- Mark Okraku-Mantey, Ghanaian music producer and politician, Deputy Ministry of Tourism, Culture and Creative Arts.
- Michael Kwasi Osei, Ghanaian politician, and member of parliament in the second republic.
- Michael Edem Akafia, Ghanaian lawyer, mining executive and president of Ghana Chamber of Mines
- Hackman Owusu-Agyeman, diplomat, former minister of state, entrepreneur and member of parliament;
- Ellis Owusu-Dabo, a Ghanaian academic and Pro Vice-Chancellor of the Kwame Nkrumah University of Science and Technology.
- Patrick Kwame Kusi Quaidoo, a politician and minister in the Nkrumah government
- Arnold Quainoo, a retired Ghanaian military officer who served as the Chief of the Defence Staff (Ghana) of the Ghana Armed Forces.
- Francis Selormey, a Ghanaian novelist.
- Victor Selormey, a politician and former deputy minister of Finance and Economic Planning
- Emile Short, a Ghanaian judge and academic and the first Commissioner on Human Rights and Administrative Justice in Ghana.
- Clifford Nii Boi Tagoe, former Vice Chancellor of the University of Ghana;
- Ebo Taylor, a Ghanaian guitarist, composer, arranger, bandleader, and producer.
- Herbert Winful, engineering professor
- Nathaniel Boso, academic, corporate, and international marketing strategist
- Alexander Afenyo-Markin, Ghanaian politician and business man

== School Code ==
0030101
