= Victor Selormey =

Ghanaian politician

Deputy Minister of Finance and Economic Planning
- In office January 1993 – January 2001
- President: Jerry John Rawlings

Personal details
- Born: Victor Lawrence Kwashie Selormey; 8 December 1946
- Died: 18 April 2005 (aged 58) Korle Bu Teaching Hospital, Accra
- Party: National Democratic Congress
- Relations: Kokui Selormey (daughter)
- Education: St. Augustine's College
- Alma mater: University of Ghana; University of Wales
- Occupation: Economist

Victor Lawrence Kwashie Selormey (8 December 1946 –18 April 2005) was a Ghanaian economist and politician. He was a member of the National Democratic Congress and served as deputy Minister of Finance during the Jerry John Rawlings government.

== Early life and education ==
Victor Selormey was an Ewe and was born on 8 December 1946 as the fourth of seven children to Michael Etsevia Selormey and Florence Naa Lamile Selormey. He began his early education at the St Joseph's Catholic School at Adabraka, Accra and continued at the St Augustine's College at Cape Coast for his secondary school education. He attended the University of Ghana and graduated in 1970 with a Bachelor of Arts degree in economics. He also completed a postgraduate course in applied statistics at the University of Ghana in 1971. He later attended the University of Wales, UK on a scholarship, earning a master's degree in development economics in 1978. He enrolled in a doctorate programme at the London School of Economics but had to abandon it due to financial constraints.

== Career ==
Selormey worked with UNESCO in Paris for a short period and later joined the Ghana Civil Service as a graduate trainee in the Ministry of Finance and Economic Planning in 1971. In the late 1970s, he took on a teaching appointment as an economics tutor at Stowe Public School in Buckingham and at the Luton Polytechnic. In 1989, he returned to Ghana to work at the Ghana State Enterprises Commission but later quit to move into private practice and as a result of a business partnership opportunity, set up RABSHOLD, a property development cum property finance company.

== Politics ==
=== NDC/NCP coalition ===
Selormey was initially a member of the National Convention Party (NCP). In 1992, the Party formed an alliance into the December 1992 elections with the National Democratic Congress (NDC). Selormey served as a member of the NDC until his death.

=== Deputy Minister of state ===
In 1993, he was co-opted into the NDC/NCP coalition Government and appointed by Jerry John Rawlings to serve as deputy Minister of Finance and Economic Planning. In that role, he served on the SSNIT board as the government of Ghana's representative and other roles in government. He also served on the International Monetary Fund (IMF) as the alternative member for Ghana, serving as representative for Ghana along with the then Governor of the Bank of Ghana Kwabena Duffuor. He also accompanied the President on several trips outside the country to deliberate on issues regarding international partnerships with Ghana, most notable amongst them being trips to US, Italy and Switzerland. He held that position until Jerry John Rawlings handed over to John Kufuor in January 2001.

== Personal life ==
Victor Selormey was married to Leona Selormey and had children including Ghanaian media personality and journalist Kokui Selormey. He was a Christian and worshipped as a Roman Catholic. He was amongst the first Tarcisians of Roman Catholic Archdiocese of Accra in the 1950s along with Jerry John Rawlings, who would later serve as the president of Ghana. He died on 18 April 2005 at the Korle Bu Teaching Hospital in Accra at the age of 58 years.
