= Ridge Church School =

Preparatory day school located in Accra, Ghana

Location
- Gamel Abdul Nasser Ave and Guinea Bissau Road, Ridge, Osu; Greater Accra Region; P. O. Box GP 2316, Accra; Ghana; 5.555447°N 0.196731°W

Information
- Type: Private preparatory day school; Parochial school
- Motto: Not only with our lips but in our lives
- Religious affiliation: Interdenominational Protestant
- Denomination: Anglican; Methodist; Presbyterian
- Established: 7 January 1957; 69 years ago
- Founder: Accra Ridge Church
- School district: Accra Metropolis
- Oversight: Accra Ridge Church Council; Ghana Education Service
- Staff: 56 teachers, 22 other staff
- Grades: K – 9
- Gender: Co-educational (Boys/Girls)
- Age range: 4 to 15 years
- Enrollment: 987
- Campus type: Suburban
- Endowment: Ridge Church School Trust Fund
- Website: Ridge Church School

The Ridge Church School is an independent and parochial co-educational preparatory day school in Accra, Ghana. Situated between the Gamel Abdul Nasser Avenue and Guinea Bissau Road and opposite the Efua Sutherland Children's Park, it was founded by the Accra Ridge Church in 1957, the year of Ghana's independence from the United Kingdom. The Ridge Church School is located on the premises of the church. It was the first wholly private basic school to be established in modern Ghana. The Accra Ridge Church was the first international solely English-speaking Protestant church in Ghana. The school is inter-denominational Christian, holding ties to the Anglican, Methodist and Presbyterian churches, that assign chaplains to both the church and school. The school runs a ten–year programme from kindergarten to lower primary through upper primary to junior high and culminating in the Basic Education Certificate Examination (BECE) administered by the West African Examinations Council (WAEC). The school largely follows the prescribed curriculum and syllabus of the Ghana Education Service (GES).

== History ==
On 23 January 1955, the congregants at the Annual General Meeting of the Accra Ridge Church voted to accept the decision to establish a school. The church amended its constitution to enable the incorporation of the school in order to give the legal oversight of the school to the Church Council. Direct management of the school is undertaken by a nine-member Board of Governors which reports to the Church Council as the ultimate approving authority.

The Accra Ridge Church raised funds and the official opening of the school took place on 7 January 1957 as inter-denominational school for children of Christian expatriate church members living in Ghana. The first headmistress was Mrs. Ellen Stronge. The school's Parent-Teacher Association was formed in 1958. At the school's opening, there were thirty-three pupils in the first and second grades in two streams. The first two classes were housed in a single block of two classrooms and washrooms. Later on, more classroom blocks and other facilities were added to the school infrastructure. In the early days, there were pupils from nearly 40 countries. After the overthrow of Kwame Nkrumah in 1966, many expatriates left the country and indirectly affected the school's international make-up.

In addition, other international schools such as the Lincoln Community School, the Swiss School and Ghana International School were established. In 1978, a third stream was added to each class. The junior secondary curriculum was introduced in 1987 while the upper primary school started subject level teaching in September 2003.

== Facilities and infrastructure ==
Apart from thirty-two classrooms, the school has a multi-purpose block that houses a library, an assembly hall, a computer laboratory, washrooms and a storeroom. Other blocks have a kindergarten and a playroom, staff rooms, a school cafeteria and a canopy walkway connecting the lower secondary school to the kindergarten and primary departments. The school also owns a home economics or catering centre, an administration block, a science laboratory, an infirmary and a pre-technical skills workshop for wood and metalwork. There is also a basketball court and an AstroTurf football field on the campus.

== Learning environment ==
=== Curriculum ===
The school population is 987 pupils comprising 466 boys and 521 girls. The academic year runs on a three term calendar: Advent, Lent and Trinity terms. In 2011, the school introduced a one–year kindergarten programme for 5-year-olds. The 10-year curriculum is therefore made up of a one-year kindergarten course, 6-year primary school and three years of Junior High School. The headmistress is assisted by three assistant heads for each department: kindergarten and lower primary; upper primary and the junior high departments. The three-year (9-term) Junior High School (JHS) curriculum according to the Ghana Education Service syllabus prepares students for the Basic Education Certificate Examination (BECE) conducted by the West African Examinations Council. All pupils are trained in the Marion Richardson handwriting system. School subjects taught include languages including English, French, Ghanaian languages such as Ga and Twi, mathematics, music, natural sciences, social studies, religious and moral education, basic design and technology (pre-vocational skills, graphic design & pre-technical skills), home economics (catering & life skills), information and communications technology (ICT) and physical education. In the 1970s, all Common Entrance Examination candidates from the school were admitted to their first choice secondary school as a result of the school's selectivity and rigorous curriculum. The school has consistently obtained a 100% pass rate in the Common Entrance Examination and later, the Basic Education Certificate Examination, making it one of the best basic schools in the country and a feeder for highly selective secondary schools.

Pupils are required to take part in extra-curricular club activities every Thursday. Options include Girl and Ananse Guide, Red Cross, Good News Club, Reading Club, Sports Club, Cadet Corps, Ballet, Chess, Boys’ Scout, Science Club, Cultural Drumming and Dancing Club, Music and Drama Club. Over the years, pupils of the schools have participated in various local and international inter-school academic and sports competitions such as The Spelling Bee Ghana and the Scripps National Spelling Bee.

=== Terms ===
There are three academic terms in the year:

- The Advent Term, from early September to mid December
- The Lent Term, from mid January to late March or early April
- The Trinity Term, from late April to late June or early July

=== Staff ===
The school has 56 teachers who are diploma and first degree holders: 4 for kindergarten; 29 for primary school and 23 for the JHS department. Lower-primary teaching is done at the class level. Upper primary and junior high students are taught at the subject level. The non-teaching staff is made up of an administrative officer, an accountant, a librarian, a caretaker, a cashier, a storekeeper, a driver, six campus security men and nine other ancillary staff.

=== Section system ===
There are four sections at the Ridge Church School. From kindergarten through to the Junior High School, each pupil belongs to one of four sections: Sackey (Red), Hooper (Yellow), Stronge (Blue), Bennett (Green). The purpose of the section system is to foster healthy social contact across all pupils at the school. The section system forms the basis for inter-house competitions such as Sports (Football/Soccer, Basketball, Athletics/ Track and Field, etc.), Public Speaking (Speech and Debate), Music, Dance and Drama.

Section	Colour
Hooper	Yellow
Sackey	Red
Stronge	Blue
Bennett	Green

== School heads ==
The following individuals have served as the headmistress of the school:

Name	Tenure of office
Mrs. Ellen Stronge (Mrs. Bates)	1957
Mrs. Doreen Warman	1957–66
Mrs. Gladys Osae-Addo	1966–82
Mrs. Victoria Oddoye	1982–88
Mrs. Gladys Andrews	1988–90
Mrs. Eileen Abbam	1990–91
Mrs. Paulina Addo	1991–96
Ms. Elinor Torto	1997–03
Mrs. Afua Dake	2003–19
Mrs. Nana Ama Badasu	2019–

== Notable alumni ==
- Junior Agogo, footballer
- Joseph Samuel Annan, MP, Parliament of Ghana (2009–13)
- Nathaniel Attoh, professional master of ceremonies, international boxing ring announcer, and television and radio journalist
- D-Black, musician
- Herman Chinery-Hesse, technology entrepreneur
- Joe Ghartey, lawyer, academic and politician
- Gisela Abbam, Global Senior Executive and Chair of Pharmacy regulator
- Nana Oye Lithur, barrister, gender advocate and politician
- Jean Adukwei Mensa, Electoral Commissioner of Ghana
- Florence Oboshie Sai-Coffie, media executive and politician
- Kokui Selormey, media personality
- Mabel Simpson, fashion designer

== See also ==
- Education in Ghana
