= Joseph Samuel Annan =

Ghanaian politician

Hon. Joseph Annan
- Constituency: Komenda/Edina/Eguafo/Abrem

Member of Parliament
- In office 7 January 2009 – 6 January 2013
- President: John Atta Mills
- Succeeded by: Stephen Nana Ato Arthur
- Constituency: Komenda/Edina/Eguafo/Abrem
- Majority: NDC

Personal details
- Born: 18 December 1953 (age 72)
- Party: National Democratic Congress
- Children: 3

Joseph Annan (born 18 December 1953) is a Ghanaian politician. He was the Member of Parliament representing the Komenda/Edina/Eguafo/Abrem constituency in the 5th parliament of the 4th republic of Ghana.

== Early life and education ==
Annan was born on 18 December 1953 in Komenda in the Central Region of Ghana. He had his basic education at the Ridge Church School in Accra. After obtaining his GCE A and O levels certificates he studied Sociology, Psychology, statistics and Zoology at the Chelsea College. He became a dental surgeon after his studies in dental surgery at the Royal London Hospital Medical College in 1977. He studied also for a Master of Science in economics, Health Planning and Financing from the London School of Economics and London School of Hygiene and Tropical Medicine.

== Career ==
Annan worked as an oral surgeon from 1978 to 1982 and as a dental surgeon from 1982 to 1988. From 1988 to 1992 he worked as a senior governmental dental officer and maxillo-facial surgeon at the Ministry of Health in Zimbabwe. From 1994 to 2002 he worked as the executive director of JSA Consultants Int. in Ghana.

== Politics ==
Annan represented the Komenda/Edina/Eguafo/Abrem constituency as the Member of Parliament in the 5th parliament of the 4th republic of Ghana. This was after he was elected on the ticket of the National Democratic Congress in the 2008 general elections in Ghana. He obtained 48.83% of total valid votes cast. Stephen Nana Ato Arthur of the New Patriotic Party and Joachim Bruku Eshun of the Convention People's Party lost by obtaining 41.41% and 9.76% of total votes cast respectively.

== Personal life ==
Annan is married with three children. He is a Christian (Methodist).
