= Maame Esi Acquah Taylor =

Ghanaian model and fashion entrepreneur

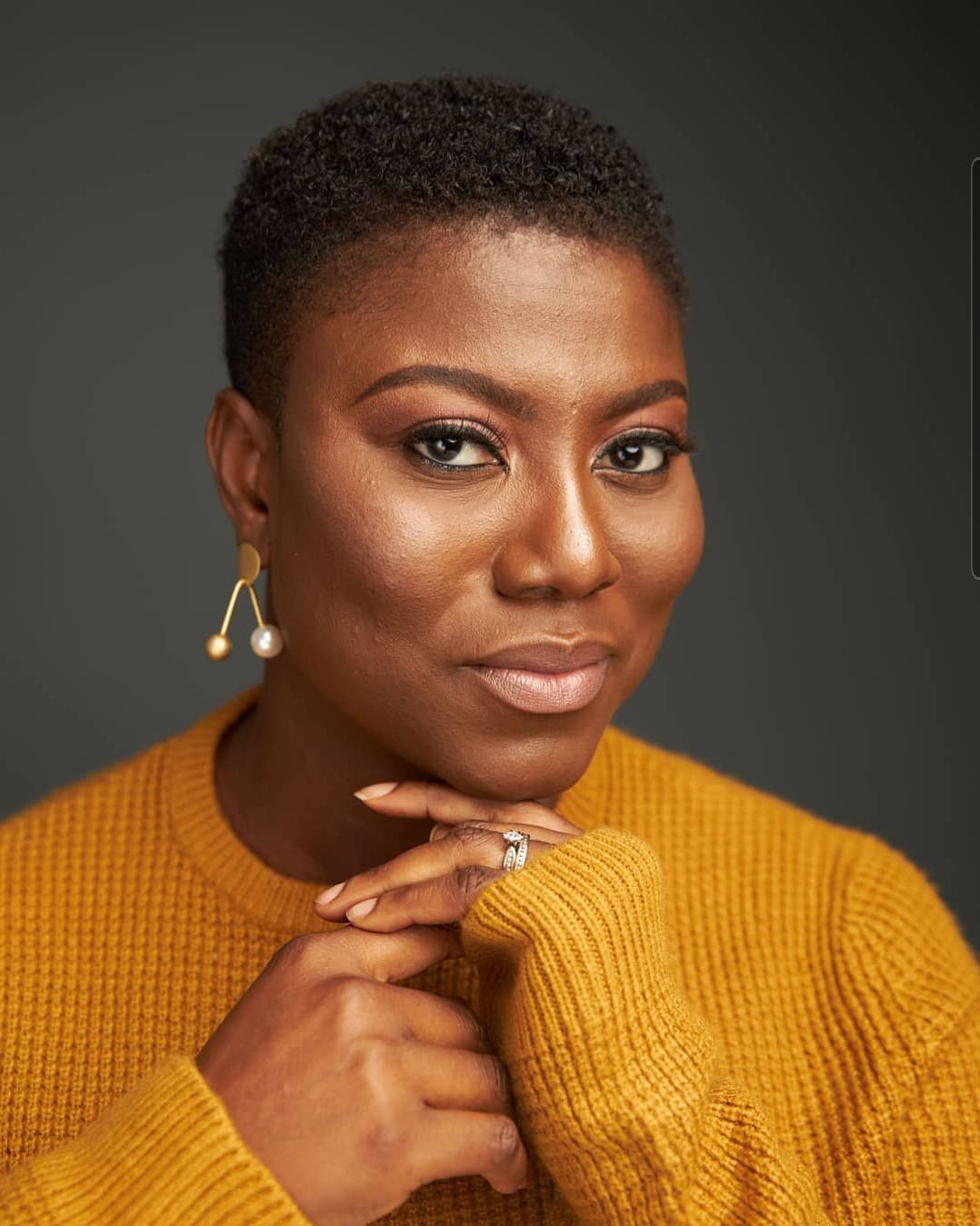
- Portrait of Maame Esi Acquah Taylor
- Born: Maame Esi Acquah; 1980 (age 45–46); Cape Coast, Central Region, Ghana
- Education: Holy Child High School; University of Cape Coast
- Occupation: Fashion entrepreneur

Maame Esi Acquah Taylor is a Ghanaian fashion entrepreneur and beauty pageant titleholder. She was crowned Miss Universe Ghana in 2000 and represented Ghana at the Miss Universe 2000 pageant in Cyprus. She is currently the founder and chief executive officer (CEO) of Aha Brands. Born and raised in Cape Coast, Central Region, Ghana. She is a graduate of the University of Cape Coast.

== Early life and education ==
Maame Esi Acquah Taylor was born in 1980 at Cape Coast, in the Central Region of Ghana. She started her early education from St Monica's Primary and Cape Coast University JSS between 1986 and 1994 before furthering to secondary school at Holy Child Secondary School in Cape Coast. She offered General Arts during her study at Holy Child and later undertook a degree program at the University of Cape Coast.

== Miss Universe Ghana ==
In 2000, Taylor was crowned the Miss Universe Ghana which qualified her to represent Ghana at the Miss Universe pageant in Cyprus.

== Career ==
Taylor kickstarted her career in the media landscape by working as a broadcast journalist and news achor at Citi FM which is an Accra-English based radio station. She further freelanced with the State Broadcasting Corporation, Ghana Television where she co-presented 'The Breakfast Show' with Gifty Anti.

She had served as a Senior Banking officer at Zenith Bank, Ghana. In September 2020, she served as a judge in the Accra Mall Future Fashion Fund were Edzordzinam Agrosah was awarded the winner of the second edition.

Her foundation Aha Pink Warriors established in 2018 aimed at fighting breast cancer. She established Aha Brands in 2012 which deals in accessories, lingerie, swimwear and Lawen Taylor's

== Personal life ==
Taylor is married and has six children.
