= Tawia Modibo Ocran =

Academic and Supreme Court Judge

Supreme Court Judge
- In office 2004–2008
- Appointed by: John Kufuor

Personal details
- Born: September 12, 1942 Nsuaem, Tarkwa, Ghana
- Died: October 27, 2008 (aged 66) Akron, Ohio
- Spouse: Adelaide Ocran
- Children: 5

Professor Justice Tawia Modibo Ocran (September 12, 1942 – October 27, 2008) was an academic and a Supreme Court Judge in Ghana.

== Early life and education ==
Justice Professor Tawia Modibo Ocran was born on September 12, 1942, at Tarkwa-Nsuaem in the Western Region of Ghana. Christened John Tawia Ocran, he was the last child of the late Mr. Joseph Samuel Ocran, an elementary school headteacher, and Madam Ama Amireku Ocran, a housewife. Justice Ocran had his elementary school education at Tarkwa-Nsuaem Methodist School and Tarkwa Catholic School from 1949 to 1956. He entered St. Augustine's College, Cape Coast, in 1957, where he completed both the Ordinary- and Advanced-level exams at the top of his class in 1961 and 1963 respectively. He also became the Acting School Prefect in 1962 and the House Prefect of St. Luke's House in 1962/63. He was admitted to the Law Faculty of the University of Ghana, Legon, in 1963, and graduated with an LLB. (Hon) in 1966 and a Barrister at Law (BL.) Diploma in 1967. He proceeded immediately to the University of Wisconsin, Madison, United States, from where he obtained a master's in Legal Institutions (M.L.I.) from the Law School in 1968 and an interdisciplinary Ph.D. in law and Development Studies in 1971. He also did a postgraduate research fellowship at the University of California Los Angeles (UCLA) Law School in 1968/69. He was called to the Ghana Bar in 1967.

== Career ==
=== Academia ===
From Wisconsin, Ocran embarked on a distinguished professional career spanning a range of experiences as an academic, national government executive, United Nations civil servant, and a jurist. As an academic, he taught for 20 years as a professor of law at the University of Akron School of Law in Ohio, USA, retiring from there, as holder of an endowed research professorship in law and professor emeritus, upon his appointment to the Supreme Court of Ghana in 2004. Earlier, he had been a lecturer in law at the University of Zambia (1970–73) and an associate professor of business law and finance at Jackson State University, Mississippi (1982–84). He was also an adjunct lecturer in law at the University of Ghana (1976–78); a guest lecturer at the International Law Institute in Washington, D.C., in the mid-1980s, and at the International Development Law Institute (IDLI) in Rome, Italy, in the 1980s and 1990s.

Since joining the Supreme Court in 2004, he was an adjunct professor of law at the University of Ghana; and a visiting jurist at overseas institutions, including the University of Akron School of Law in Ohio, Loyola University Law School in Chicago, Northern Illinois University Law School in DeKalb, Illinois, Washburn University School of Law in Topeka, Kansas, and the Nelson Institute for International & Foreign Affairs, James Madison University, Virginia, USA. In 2008, Ocran was elected as a Fellow of the Ghana Academy of Arts & Sciences.

Outside academia, he held a number of important positions in Ghana and elsewhere, including chief executive of the Ghana Investments Centre (1981–82); chief legal officer of the Capital Investments Board of Ghana (1975–78); legal/economic affairs officer of the UN Economic Commission for Africa and the Regional Office of the UN Centre On Transnational Corporations in Addis Ababa, Ethiopia (1978–81). In January 1977, he was appointed to the Committee on "Unigov" that drew up the programme for implementation of a "National Government instead of Unigov", established by the Supreme Military Council government. He served as a senior political affairs officer of the United Nations Peacekeeping Force for Former Yugoslavia (UNPROFOR) in Croatia in 1994–95. He was a member of the 1978 Constitutional Commission that worked on the Ghana Constitution of 1979.

In addition to the publication of several articles on international investments and international law in professional journals in the U.S. and Africa, Justice Professor Ocran has authored three books: Law in Aid of Development: Issues in Legal Theory, Economic Development and Institution-Building in Africa (Ghana Publishing Corporation, 1978); The Legacy of Kwame Nkrumah in Contemporary Ghana (1992); and The Crisis of Peacekeeping in Former Yugoslavia (2002), which carries a foreword by the former UN Secretary General, Kofi Annan.

=== International organizations ===
Ocran was a very active student leader and youth organizer in the 1960s. He became highly involved in Pan-Africanist thinking and adopted, as his middle name, the first name of the first president of Mali, Modibo Keita, a dedicated PanAfricanist. In 1965, while at the University of Ghana, Modibo (as he was popularly called by his college mates) was elected the national president of the Ghana Socialist Students Organisation (GHANASSO), a pro-Nkrumah student movement embracing all the tertiary educational institutions in Ghana. In that capacity, he was briefly detained after the military coup against Kwame Nkrumah in 1966.

Earlier, he had served as secretary/convener of the Legon Branch of the Convention People's Party (1964/65); a member of the Youth Bureau of the National Secretariat at the CPP Headquarters (1964/66); and president of the United Nations Student Association (UNSA), University of Ghana Branch(1964), and the Central Region Secondary Schools Cluster of Branches (1962/63). In the 1970s, on his return from lectureship at the University of Zambia, he maintained his interest in Ghanaian youth and national affairs, becoming the general secretary of the Western Region Youth Association (WERYA) (1976–78).

== Death ==
Tawia Ocran died on October 27, 2008, in Akron, Ohio, United States. He is survived by his wife Adelaide, a lawyer and law librarian by training and their five children: Araba, Yoofi, Ato, Kojo, and Ama.

== See also ==
- List of judges of the Supreme Court of Ghana
- Judiciary of Ghana
- Supreme Court of Ghana
