= Ben Brako =

Ghanaian highlife artiste

- Born: Bernard George Kobena Brako; 20 May 1952 (age 73); Accra, Ghana
- Education: St Augustine's College; University of Ghana; University of East London
- Notable work: Baya (1987)
- Musical career
- Genres: Ghanaian Highlife
- Occupations: Singer, media personality
- Instrument: Vocals

Bernard George Kobena Brako, known professionally as Ben Brako (born 20 May 1952), is a Ghanaian highlife artiste. He became well-known for his first solo studio album titled "Baya", which was released in 1987

== Early life ==
Brako was born on 20 May 1952 in Accra, Ghana, but grew up in his mother's native Cape Coast with his seven siblings. He took an active interest in the music and entertainment world at a young age in St John’s Preparatory School, Accra

== Education ==
Brako had his secondary education at St Augustine's College in Cape Coast, where he co-pioneered the St Augustine’s College School Band. From his sixth form education at Tema Secondary School, he pursued a Bachelor of Science degree in Agricultural Economics from the University of Ghana and graduated in 1975.

He also obtained a BA (Hons) in Media Communication Studies from the University of East London.

== Achievements ==
In 2019, Ben Brako's single titled "Shame and Scandal" topped the Global Music Charts at number 1.
