= Kokui Selormey Hanson =

Ghanaian media personality

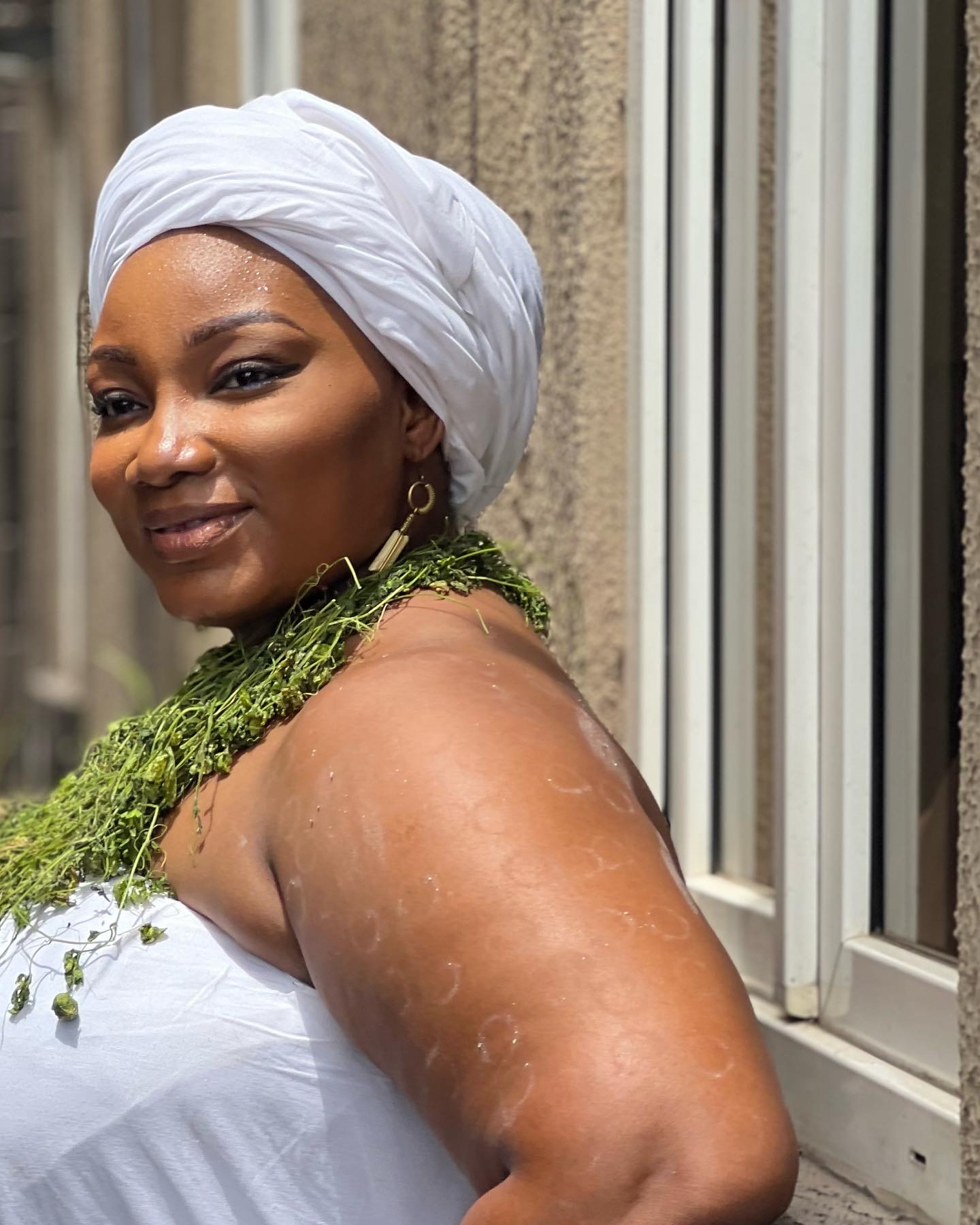
- Born: Kokui Selormey; 1978 (age 47–48)
- Education: Spelman College; New England Conservatory of Music
- Occupations: Presenter, Broadcast journalist, Singer, Entrepreneur
- Spouse: Kobbi Hanson (married 2011–present)
- Father: Victor Selormey
- Awards: Television Female Presenter of the Year (2016); Television Morning Show Host of the Year(2016)

Kokui Selormey Hanson (born 1978) is a Ghanaian media personality, presenter, broadcast journalist and entrepreneur. She has also worked as a producer and as a singer.

== Early life and education ==
Selormey is the daughter of former statesman Victor Selormey. She completed her elementary and secondary education at Ridge Church School and Holy Child Senior High School, respectively. She also studied at Allen Academy in Texas, prior to completing an undergraduate degree in music and theatre at Spelman College, Atlanta. She received a master's degree from the New England Conservatory of Music.

== Career ==
Selormey worked with the Ghana Civil Service in 2009. From there she moved to Citi FM, where she co-hosted The Citi Breakfast Show and hosted Classic Citi. From 2012–2016, she co-hosted and produced content for This Morning with Patrice Amegashie, on Viasat 1. She also presented for Healthline, a series sponsored by Vodafone Ghana. Selormey was the host and producer for Head Start on Kwesé TV. She also hosted Home Run and Final Whistle on the same network.

As a singer, Selormey was featured on Nubian Noel, a Christmas album with South African musician Hugh Masekela.

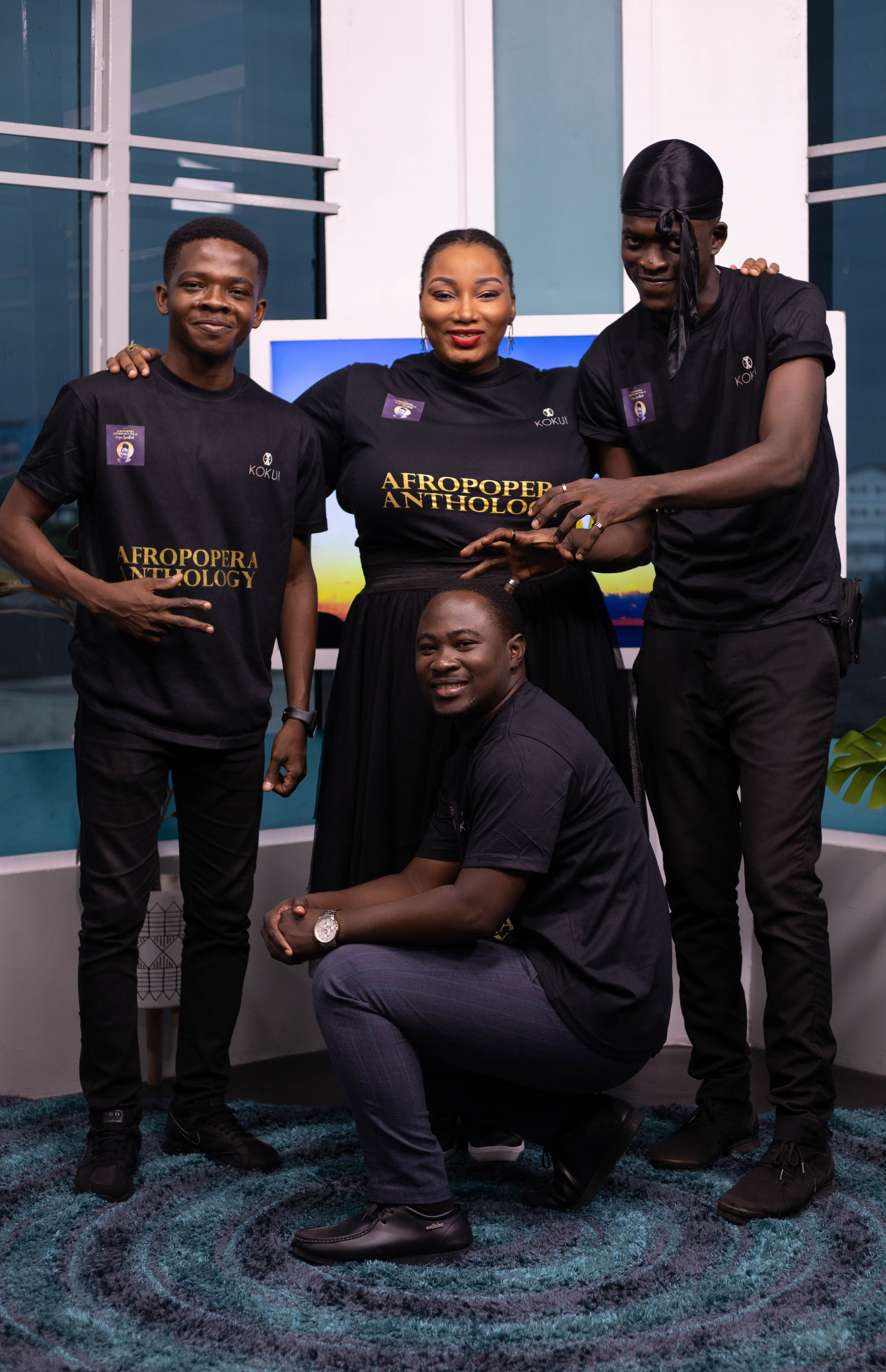
Kokui Selormey and her group of musicians

In 2014, she was appointed as an ambassador for Philips Avent's 30th Anniversary Celebration in Ghana. Selormey is a brand influencer for Vlisco in Ghana and has been a parent ambassador for SKY Girls Ghana since 2017. She launched her fashion brand in 2018.

Selormey hosted the first Ghana Virtual Career Fair in July 2020, organised by the Ghanaian-German Centre for Jobs, Migration and Reintegration (GGC), in cooperation with the Delegation of German Industry and Commerce in Ghana (AHK Ghana) and the Ministry of Employment and Labour Relations. The event was also funded by the German Development Cooperation.

She rejoined the Citi FM morning show The Citi Breakfast Show team, consisting of Bernard Avle, Kojo Akoto Boateng, Nathan Quao and Godfred Akoto Boafo.

In 2022, she was featured in a hospital drama series titled Accra Medic.

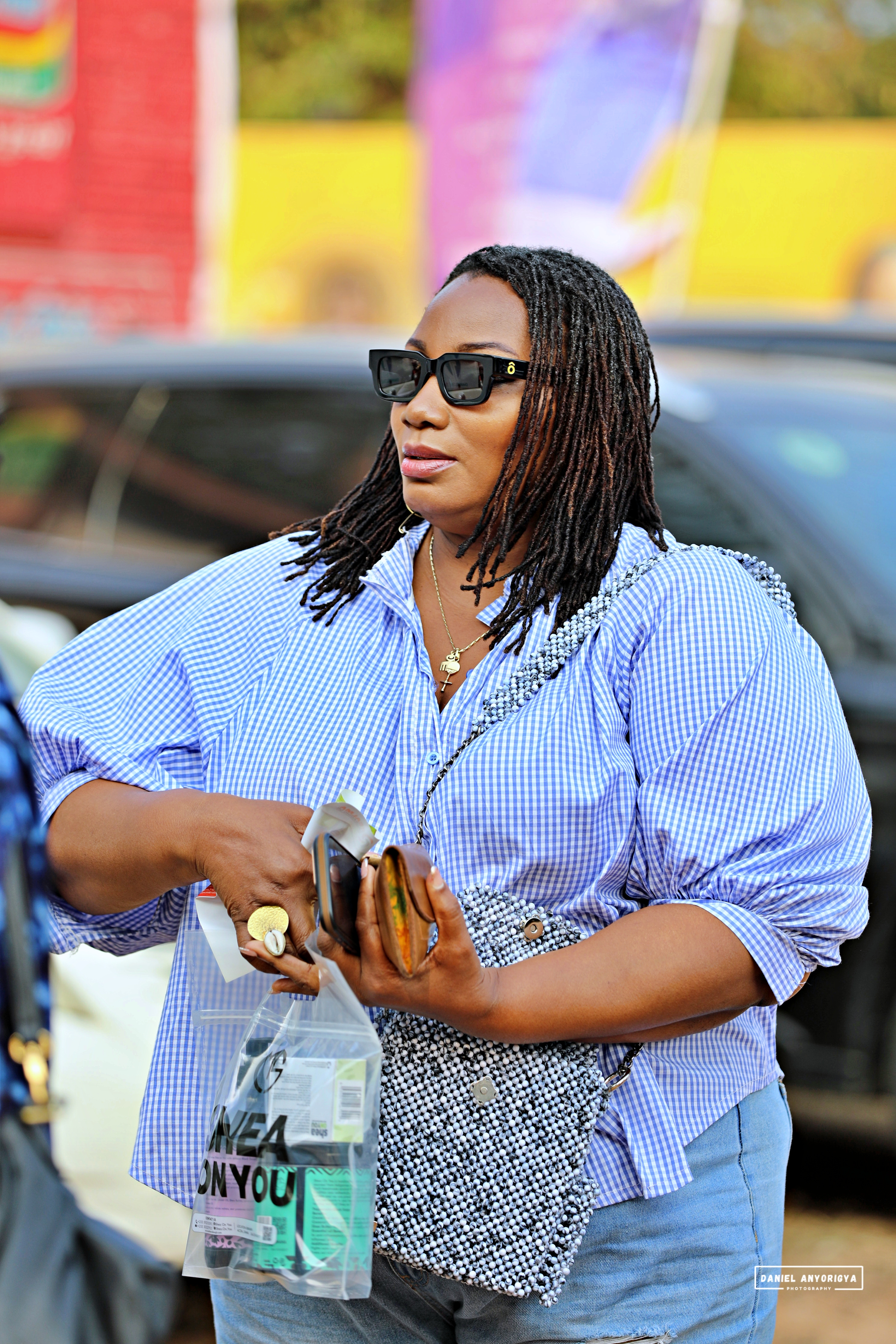
Kokui Selormey Hanson

The same year, she and other Ghanaian musicians collaborated on Afropopera Anthology Vol 1: Negro Spirituals. Selormey was the lead vocalist for the project.

== Personal life ==
In 2011, Selormey married Kobbi Hanson. They have four children.

== Awards ==
She won Television Female Presenter of the Year and Television Morning Show Host of the Year at the 2016 Radio and Television Personality Awards.
