= Mary Spio =

Ghanaian engineer, entrepreneur and innovator

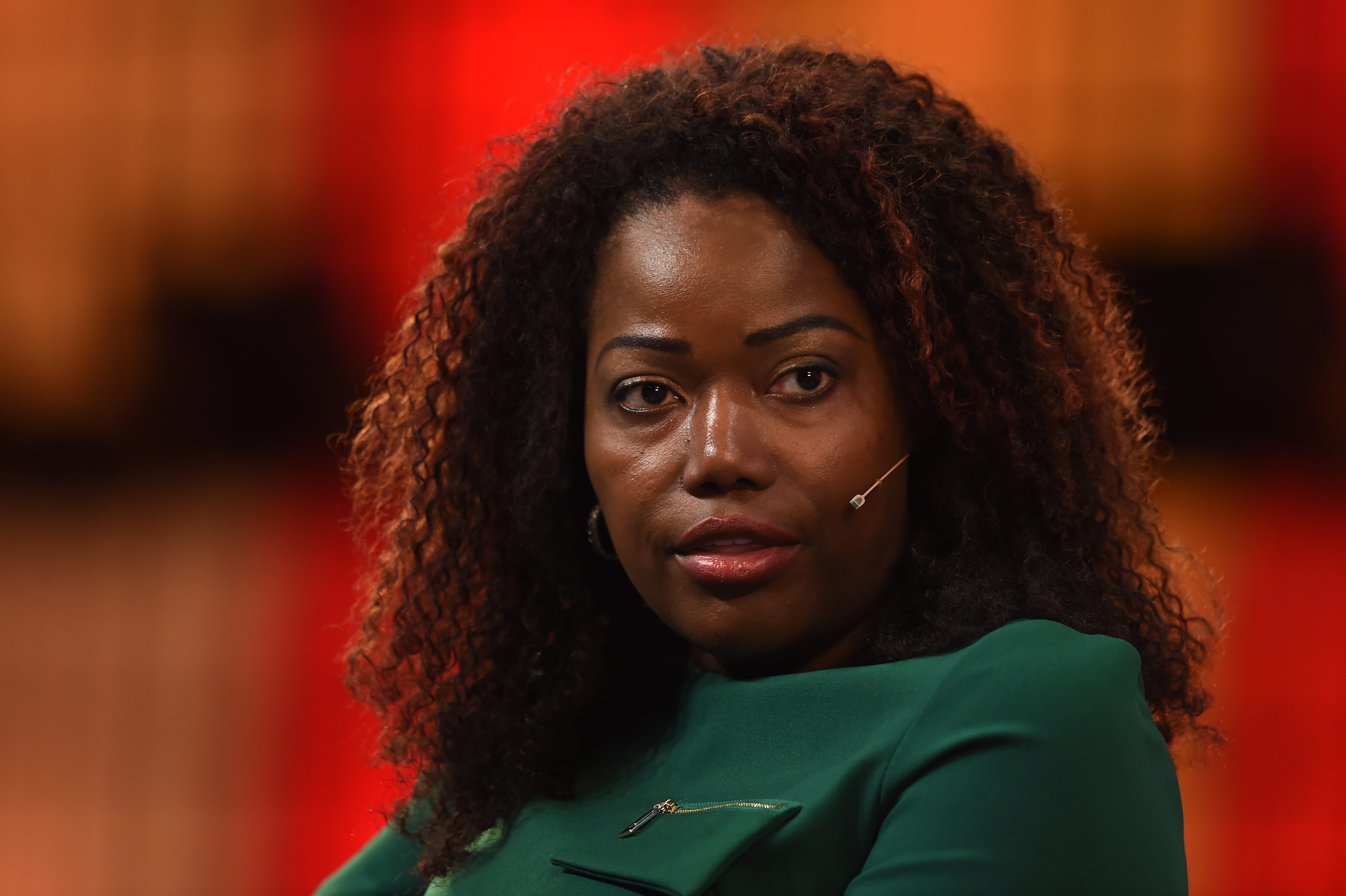
- Born: Syracuse, New York, United States
- Education: Holy Child High School; Syracuse University (BSc); Georgia Institute of Technology (MSc)
- Occupations: Deep space engineer, Tech innovator and Entrepreneur
- Years active: 2000–present
- Organization: CEEK VR

Mary Spio is an American deep space engineer, tech innovator and entrepreneur. She is the CEO and founder of CEEK Virtual Reality.

== Early life and education ==
Spio was raised in Ghana. She had her secondary school education at Holy Child High School in Cape Coast. At the age of 16, she moved to stay in Syracuse, New York, in the US. She attended Syracuse University, graduating with a Bachelor of Science degree in electrical engineering in 1998. She later pursued a master's degree in electrical engineering and computer science from Georgia Institute of Technology.

== Career ==
Spio served in the U.S. Air Force for six years as a wideband and satellite communications technician. After her service in the air force, she moved to work with a at a satellite communications firm and had the opportunity of designing and launching satellites into deep space on a NASA project. She subsequently became the head of satellite communication systems for the Boeing Corporation.

=== CEEK VR ===
In 2015, Spio founded the CEEK Virtual Reality platform, currently run as a streaming service for virtual events which enables live events and helps content creators to reach their fans and users through virtual means, including virtual reality headsets, gaming consoles, mobile phones, tablets, desktops, laptops and Smart TVs. The CEEK VR platform was expanded into the CEEK VR App and the CEEK website.

== Author ==
Spio is also a writer and is the author of It's Not Rocket Science: 7 Game-Changing Traits for Uncommon Success, a self-help book published in 2015, and A Song for Carmine, a love-romance novel. She has also contributed to Chicken Soup for the Soul in the past. Spio was also a keynote speaker at the Women in Tech Global Conference in 2020, where she shared insights on virtual reality and its future applications.
