= Samuel Kobina Annim =

Ghanaian economist

- Born: Samuel Kobina Annim
- Education: St. Augustine's College, University of Cape Coast, University of Ghana, University of Manchester
- Occupation: Statistician

Samuel Kobina Annim is a Ghanaian professor of economics with specific concentration on micro development economics and applied micro econometrics, statistician and the current head of the Ghana Statistical Service. He was appointed on 1 March 2019

== Education ==
Annim attended St. Augustine's College, and earned his first degree in Economics from the University of Cape Coast. He was awarded a Master of Philosophy Degree in Economics from the University of Ghana. He earned his PhD degree in Economics from Manchester University. Following the completion of his doctoral studies, Samuel was engaged at the University of Manchester and University of Lancashire, both in the United Kingdom, in the respective capacities of Research Associate and Post-doctoral Research Fellow.

== Career ==
Samuel Annim started his career as a lecturer and has approximately 20 years teaching experience in Universities both in Ghana and abroad. While at the University of Cape Coast, he contributed to a number of interventions including; institutionalization of microfinance programmes and a conference, establishment of a Data Repository Centre; upgrading the status of the Department of Economics to a School and the development of a host of policies that promotes scholarship and research administration.

== Works and publications ==
Samuel Annim has more than 60 peer-reviewed journal articles, book chapters and technical reports to his credit. His publications are available in academic outlets such as World Development, Journal of Development Studies, Journal of International Development and the Oxford University Press.
