= Amissano =

Amisano Amisano
- small town
- Location within Ghana
- Coordinates: 5°8′N 1°21′W
- Country: Ghana
- Region: Central Region
- District: KEEA Municipal
- Elevation: 39 ft (12 m)
- Time zone: GMT
  - Summer (DST): GMT

Amisano (or Amisano) is a small town in the KEEA Municipal district, a district in the Central Region of Ghana. The SMA Fathers conceived an idea to establish the first Catholic College and Seminary in Ghana. After searching for land in the KEEA district, they finally found Land at Amisano. St. Augustine's College (Cape Coast) was founded in Amisano in 1930 and in 1936, it was moved to Cape Coast
