= Holy Child High School, Ghana =

All girls' high school in Cape Coast, Ghana

Holy Child School

Location
- PO Box 203; Cape Coast; Central Region; Cape Coast; Ghana; 5°07′17″N 1°14′01″W

Information
- Type: Public high school
- Motto: Latin: Facta Non Verba (Actions Not Words)
- Religious affiliation: Catholicism
- Established: 1946; 80 years ago
- Founder: Society of the Holy Child Jesus
- Sister school: St. Augustine's College
- School district: Cape Coast Metropolitan Assembly
- Headmistress: Linda Appiah
- Chaplain: Rev. Fr George Atta Baidoo
- Gender: Female
- Age: 15 to 18
- Houses: 9
- Colours: Yellow and brown
- Song: Thou art the Light
- Sports: Football, Rugby, Basketball, Hockey, Table tennis, Volleyball, Netball, Handball
- Nickname: Holico
- Rival: Wesley Girls Senior High School

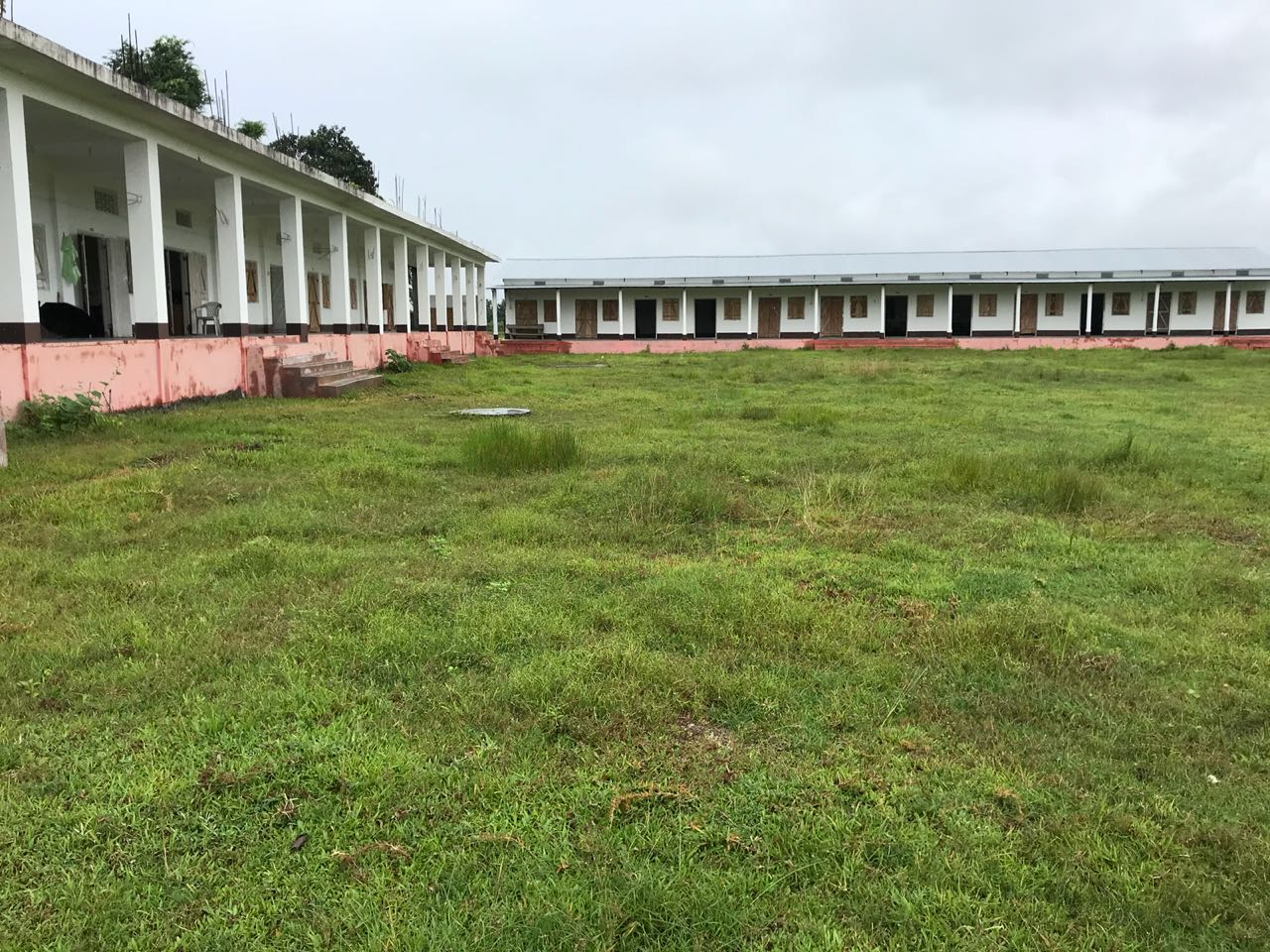
Holy Child senior high school.

Holy Child School, also known as Angel's Hill, is an all girls boarding second-cycle institution in Cape Coast in the Central Region of Ghana. In 2003, the school was ranked among the best 10 schools in Africa, producing the best overall female student in the 2003 Senior Secondary School Certificate Examinations (SSSCE) Holy Child School also produced the best and second-best overall students for the 2017 West African Senior School Examination, WASSCE.

The school was founded by the Society of the Holy Child Jesus (SHCJ) in 1946 to provide education to Catholics within the region. The current student population stands at over 1000 girls aged between 14 and 18 years. All students of Holy Child School are boarders. The school motto is, in Latin: Facta Non Verba, translated to mean "Actions Not Words". The present headmistress of the school is Linda Appiah. The school's colours are yellow and brown.

== History ==
Following the establishment of Mfantsipim School (Methodist) and Adisadel College (Anglican) in 1876 and 1910 respectively, the Catholic community in Ghana were eager for the establishment of Roman Catholic-based education in Ghana.

On 15 January 1935, Bishop Porter blessed and led a ceremony for the laying of the foundation-stone of St. Augustine's College, which was solemnly laid by Sir Arnold W. Hodson, the then Governor. His Lordship then turned his attention to female education.

"As far as possible", said Bishop Porter, every Catholic was to be educated in a Catholic School or College. The reason is very obvious. The ordinary man or woman imbibes his or her Catholicism from practice rather than theory. Catholicism in the school and the college is thus too necessary for the Catholic boy or girl. Their conversations at table and during recreations, their games and work and the expression of their ideals themselves, in a word, their whole body, mind and soul must be thoroughly a Catholic. And can the Catholic atmosphere, that almost indefinable atmosphere be found anywhere else besides the Catholic School and College?"

Therefore, to meet the increasing demands for wider educational facilities for girls, a reorganisation of existing establishments and the provisions of new schools became an urgent necessity.

Many female teachers were needed to help teach in schools. Shortage of teachers was acute. As far back as 1934 Bishop Porter of the Gold Coast Colony Vicariate had appealed to Rev. Mother General to open a Secondary School for girls in his Vicariate, but it was not until World War II between 1939 and 1945 that the foundation was seriously discussed and accepted. On 12 August 1945 the foundation stone of Holy Child (the combined Catholic Teacher-Training College and Secondary School for girls) was solemnly blessed by His Lordship Bishop William Porter and laid by the Honourable T. R. O. Mangin, the Chief Commissioner of the Colony. The Commissioner was very happy that one of the post-war projects was to be the provision of education for girls.

The first party of three nuns, Rev. Mother Mary Joachim, Mother Mary Cyril (assistant) and Mother Mary St. Edward, landed at Takoradi on 20 February 1946. They were met at the wharf, first by the Rev. Father Fisher, Vicar Delegate of Bishop Porter, who was to prove himself to be a faithful friend and an invaluable counsellor during the early days of the college, and secondly, to their great joy and surprise, by Rev. Mother General and Rev. Mother Provincial. By 5 March 1946, the lower school building, the convent, three dormitory blocks, two dining-rooms, a water-tower and two bungalows had been put up, the college admitted 120 students.

His Lordship William Porter continued to encourage parents to send their daughters to Holy Child College. Consequently, by 1955 the number of students has doubled and it became necessary to transfer the Training College Department to Takoradi. Holy Child School, which started with 50 students, now had 700 students and Holy Child College now had 400.

The school offered academic as well as vocational courses. Before 1955, students did their sixth-form course at St. Augustine's College until the school secured teachers to handle sixth-form subjects. Holy Child College and School has produced and continues to produce highly qualified professional women who have served their country with great satisfaction and efficiency in accordance with the motto of the school "Facta Non Verba" (Actions Not Words). There are two distinctive features in the educational system of the society. First, the students were given some measure of freedom and trust – rather unusual in those days. One of the nuns wrote: "under such training the law of conscience becomes paramount, and a permanent basis of principle is developed which is not likely to be discarded later with the school uniform."

== Houses ==
The school currently has thirteen houses of residence

No.	House				
1.	St. Ann's				
2.	Our Lady's				
3.	St. Cornelia's				
4.	St Joseph’s				
5.	St. Agnes'				
6.	St. Theresa's(T House)				
7.	St. Catherine's (Conti)				
8.	St. Maria's				
9.	Archbishop Amissah House 1 -	10.	Archbishop Amissah House 2 -	11.	Archbishop Amissah House 3
12.	St Bakhita’s (New house) -	13.	All Saints		

== Headmistresses ==
Ordinal	Headmistress	Term start	Term end	Time in office	Notes
1	Rev. Mother Mary Joachim	1946	1955	8–9 years	
2	Rev. Mother Mary Cyril	1955	1961	5–6 years	
3	Rev. Mother Mary Marcela	1961	1967	5–6 years	
4	Rev. Sister Mary	1967	1976	8–9 years	
5	Mrs Rosemary Ampomah	1976	1978	1–2 years	
6	Rev. Sister Michelle Puma	1978	1980	1–2 years	
7	Mrs Alice Marie Agyeman	1980	2003	22–23 years	
8	Mrs Veronica Amponsa Minta Nyarku (aka Madame Brobbey)	2003	2010	6–7 years	
9	Rev. Sister Josephine Anto	2010	2019	8–9 years	
10	Mrs Anastasia Thomford-Okyere	2019	2021	1–2 years	
11	Mrs Linda Appiah	2021	incumbent	4–5 years	

== Legacy Projects ==
The following are some of the projects that the school has benefited from over the past years:

=== NUHOPSA's Legacy ===
In celebration of the 70th anniversary of the school in 2016, NUHOPSA provided the school with a Sports Complex as a Legacy Project.

The estimated GH¢127,000 project comprises two multipurpose courts (for netball, basketball, badminton, volleyball and tennis), athletics oval, a building to accommodate changing rooms and sports manager's office, and spectator stands. The complex is to be sited at the existing sports field at the bottom of the hill.

=== 1994/1996 Year Group Legacy ===
As a tradition in Holy Child School, each alumni year group, on its 25th anniversary, spearheads a legacy project intended to modernize and address a critical need that will benefit current and future students, and faculty alike to raise the standards of the school. It is for this reason that the HOPSA 94/96, decided to provide the School with a Solar-Powered Electrification System for the Entire Classroom and Administration Blocks.The total cost of the Sustainable Energy Project was approximately Five Hundred and Fifty Thousand Ghana Cedis (GHC550,000). Members of the 1994/1996 year group made some contributions with support from benevolent institutions. The project was successfully commissioned in March 2019 during the School's 73rd Anniversary celebrations.

The project comprised the following:

- the provision and installation of solar panels and inverter system to aid the electrification of the classrooms and security lights within each block
- a set 5-year funded maintenance period of the system (post installation
- training for maintenance crew including interested students on the operation and daily maintenance

=== 1995 Year Group Legacy ===
The 1995 year group collaborated with their 1970 counterparts and provided a solar electrification project for the dining and assembly halls.The cost of the project was Ghc90,000.00. The project consisted of the following:

- 16 batteries
- 20 panels
- 2 inverters

The project was commissioned by Archbishop Emeritus of Cape Coast, Most Rev. Mathias Kobina Nketsiah and was a precursor to the 74th anniversary and Speech and Prize Giving Day.

== Alliance ==
Holy Child School has an ongoing alliance with their fellow Catholic boys' school, St. Augustine's College. The alliance is known as APSU-HOPSA.

== Notable alumni ==
- Betty Acquah
- Marian Ewurama Addy
- Akosua Agyapong
- Nana Aba Appiah Amfo
- Joyce Bamford-Addo
- Anna Bossman
- Phyllis Christian
- Angela Dwamena-Aboagye
- Aanaa Enin
- Regina Honu
- Yvette Adounvo Atekpe
- Valerie Lawson
- Philomena Nyarko - former government statistician
- Nikoletta Samonas
- Kokui Selormey
- Mary Spio
- Maame Esi Acquah Taylor
- Ama Pomaa Boateng
