= J. K. Bandoh =

Ghanaian physician (1931–2014)

- Born: Joseph Kenneth Bandoh; 24 October 1931; Bekwai, Gold Coast
- Died: 13 December 2014 (aged 83)
- Education: St. Augustine's College; University College of the Gold Coast (BSc); King's College London (MB BS)
- Occupation: Physician

Joseph Kenneth Bandoh, FRCP, FWACP (24 October 1931 – 13 December 2014) was a Ghanaian physician. He was the director of medical services at the Ministry of Defence, and a former president of the West African College of Physicians. He was a fellow of the West African College of Physicians, and the Royal College of Physicians.

== Early life and education ==
Bandoh was born on 24 October 1931 to Chief Kwaku Bandoh of Amponya, then a farmer, and Akosua Anane Bandoh at Bekwai, a town in the Ashanti Region of Ghana. He was the eldest son and the second child of his parents.

His early formative years began at the St John’s Catholic School in Bekwai in September 1937. In 1947, he entered St. Augustine’s College, Cape Coast, where he was moved to the secondary school section by the principal after two years of his studies in the school. He passed his Cambridge School Leaving Examination with exemption from the London Matriculation Examination in 1950. He later gained admission to study at the University College of the Gold Coast (University of Ghana) on scholarship in 1951. There, he studied biology and botany and consequently obtained his Bachelor of Science degree. He was awarded another scholarship to study Medicine at the King's College Medical School in London. He graduated on 12 May 1960 with the conjoint diploma and MB BS, and consequently became a member of the Royal College of Surgeons, and a licensiate of the Royal College of Physicians.

== Career ==
Bandoh began at the Westminster Hospital's casualty department as a house surgeon from 1960 to 5 July 1961. He subsequently joined the Prince of Wales' General Hospital and later, St. Giles Hospital, London as a junior house physician and a resident pathologist (senior house officer) respectively.

Bandoh returned to Ghana in 1963 working as a physician consultant. He was first posted to the Komfo Anokye Hospital, Kumasi but was later transferred to the Korle-Bu Hospital, Accra. He was posted once more, this time, to the Tetteh Quarshie Memorial Hospital in Mampong, where he worked as a physician specialist. While working at the Tetteh Quarshie Memorial Hospital, Bandoh joined the Ghana Armed Forces and was appointed physician at the Military Hospital in January 1967 after pursuing a three-month course at the Military Academy. In 1970, he became the commanding officer of the Military Hospital and served in that capacity until November 1972. After a brief hiatus from service, he was appointed director of the Armed Forces Medical Services and given the rank of a colonel. In 1977, he became the first doctor to be elevated to the status of a brigadier general (one star general), a title he held until 1979 when he retired from the Ghana Army.

Following his retirement from the Armed Forces, Bandoh ventured private medical practice in Accra by establishing the Bandoh Medical Centre. He was a personal physician to former heads of state (Edward Akufo-Addo and General I. K. Acheampong) and Ghanaian royalty (Otumfuo Nana Osei Tutu Agyeman Prempeh II, Otumfuo Opoku Ware II, Nana Afua Kobi Serwah Ampem).

Bandoh was a member of the Ghana Medical Association, which he joined as a founding member, chairman of the Komfo Anokye Hospital rehabilitation committee, a committee whose activities led to the elevation of the Komfo Anokye Hospital to a teaching hospital for the Kwame Nkrumah University of Science and Technology Medical School. He served as a council member of the Medical and Dental Council of Ghana from 1979 to 1984, and chairman (first chairman) of the court of examiners from 1995 to 2005. He was elected fellow of the West African College of Physicians, and became the first Ghanaian to serve as its president from 1993 to 1994. He was made a member of the association's board of trustees until his death in December 2014. He was elected fellow of the Royal College of Physicians in 1975.

== Personal life ==
Bandoh married Evelyn Jocelyn van der Puije, a doctor whom he had met while working at Korle-Bu Teaching Hospital. Together, they had six children: three sons and three daughters. Bandoh was a member of the Catholic Church, and a member of the Knights of Marshall society. He died on 13 December 2014. His burial service was held on 21 February 2015 at St. John the Evangelist Catholic Church, Bekwai.
