= Mabel Simpson =

Ghanaian fashion designer (born 1984)

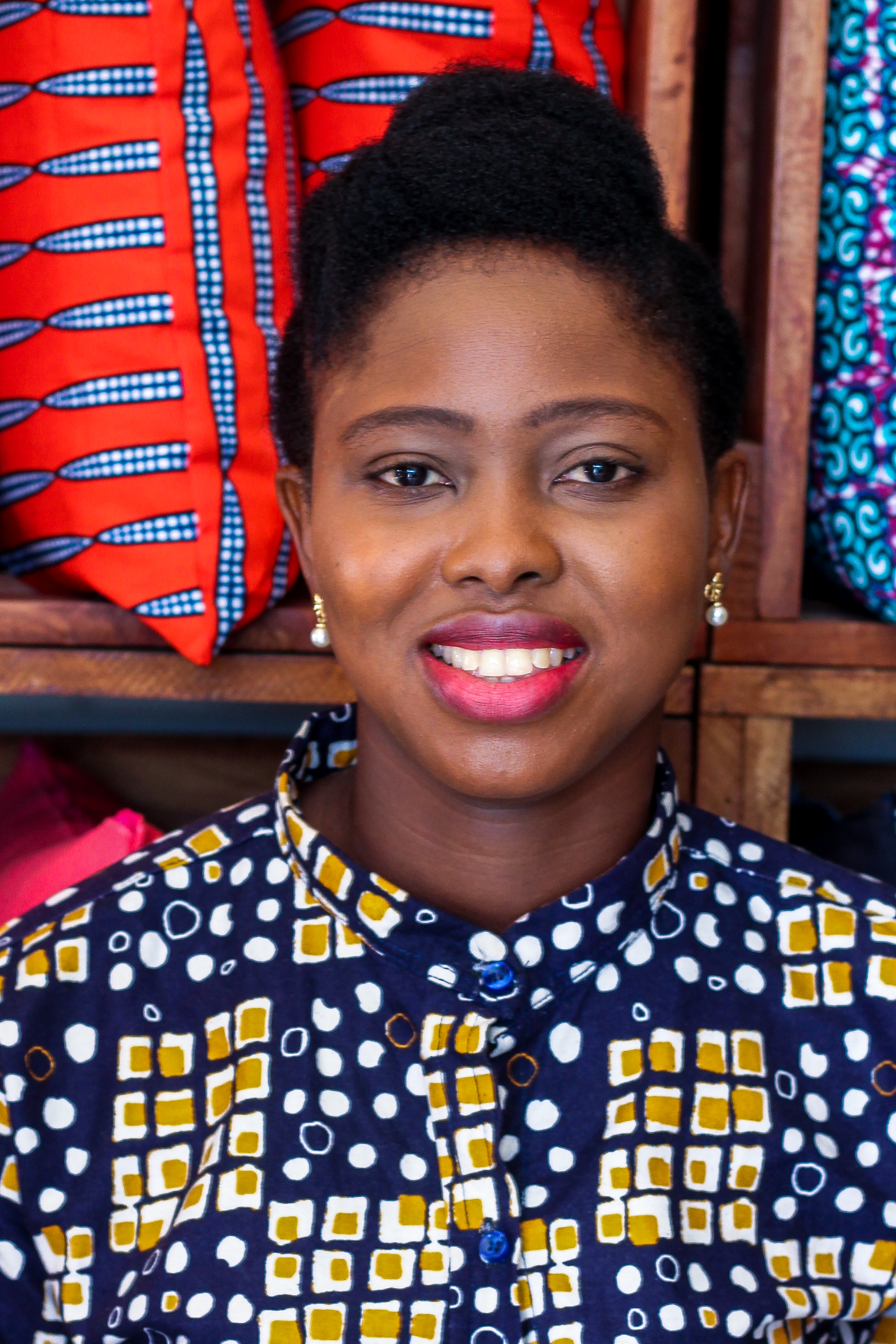
- Born: May 19, 1984 (age 41); Greater Accra, Ghana
- Occupations: Fashion designer, entrepreneur
- Known for: CEO to mSimps
- Website: https://msimpsgh.com/

Mabel Simpson is a Ghanaian fashion designer and CEO of mSimps in Ghana.

== Early life ==
Mabel was born to Mr and Mrs Simpson in Accra, Greater Accra Region of Ghana.

== Education ==
Simpson's primary education took place at Ridge Church School and her secondary education was at Wesley Girls' Senior High School, where she studied Visual Arts.

Mabel studied at the Kwame Nkrumah University of Science and Technology where she studied Communication Design and Visual Arts graduating with a Second Class Upper in BA Communication Design.

== Career ==
She started mSimps with a borrowed sewing machine from her grandmother. At age 25, with a capital of US$100 (GHS200), Simpson resigned from her office job in August 2010 to start mSimps. It took mSimps five years to go international, mSimps now has suppliers in the US, Australia, Canada Nigeria and South Africa.

== Personal life ==
She is single and fellowships at St. Augustine Anglican Church in Dansoman.

== Awards ==
- She has been recognised internationally regarding young entrepreneurship skills by CNN and BBC.
- Mabel was the 10th finalist in the Joy Fm My Business 2011
- She was also the 2ndrunner up in the 2012 Enablis / UT Bank Business LaunchPad competition
- She won the Accessory Brand of the Year 2013 at the Glitz Africa Fashion Week
- Mabel won Best Handbag and Purse Product of the Year 2013 at 1st Ghana Made Products Awards
