= Victoria Nyarko =

Ghanaian politician

Third woman member from the Northern Region
- In office 1960–1965
- Preceded by: New
- Succeeded by: Position abolished

Personal details
- Born: Victoria Nyarko; 24 May 1934 Gold Coast
- Party: Convention People's Party
- Education: Wesley Girls' High School; St. Augustine's College
- Alma mater: University of Ghana

Victoria Nyarko was a Ghanaian civil servant and politician. She served as a member of the Parliament of Ghana from 1960 to 1966. She was the Third Member for the Northern Region from 1960 to 1966.

== Early life and education ==
Nyarko was born on 24 May 1934 at Nsawam. She had her early education at the Nsawam Methodist School and the Accra Methodist School, and later proceeded to Wesley Girls' High School, Cape Coast in 1949. Following her graduation in 1952, she entered St. Augustine's College, Cape Coast, in 1953 to study her sixth form courses. She passed the Cambridge Higher Certificate examinations with exemption in the Arts subjects in 1954. She enrolled at the University of the Gold Coast (now the University of Ghana) in October 1955 to study geography with Economics as a subsidiary subject. She graduated with her Bachelor of Arts degree in June 1958.

== Career and politics ==
Nyarko begun as an education officer at the Ghana Secondary Technical School in September 1958. In October 1959, she was appointed assistant secretary to the Ministry of Foreign Affairs, and in June 1960, she entered parliament. On 27 June 1960, she was among the 10 women who were elected unopposed on the ticket of the Convention People's Party. She entered parliament at the age of 26 as the Third Member for the Northern Region. She remained in parliament until 1965.
