= Nathaniel Boso =

Ghanaian academic, corporate and international marketing strategist (born 1939)

Prof Nathaniel Boso
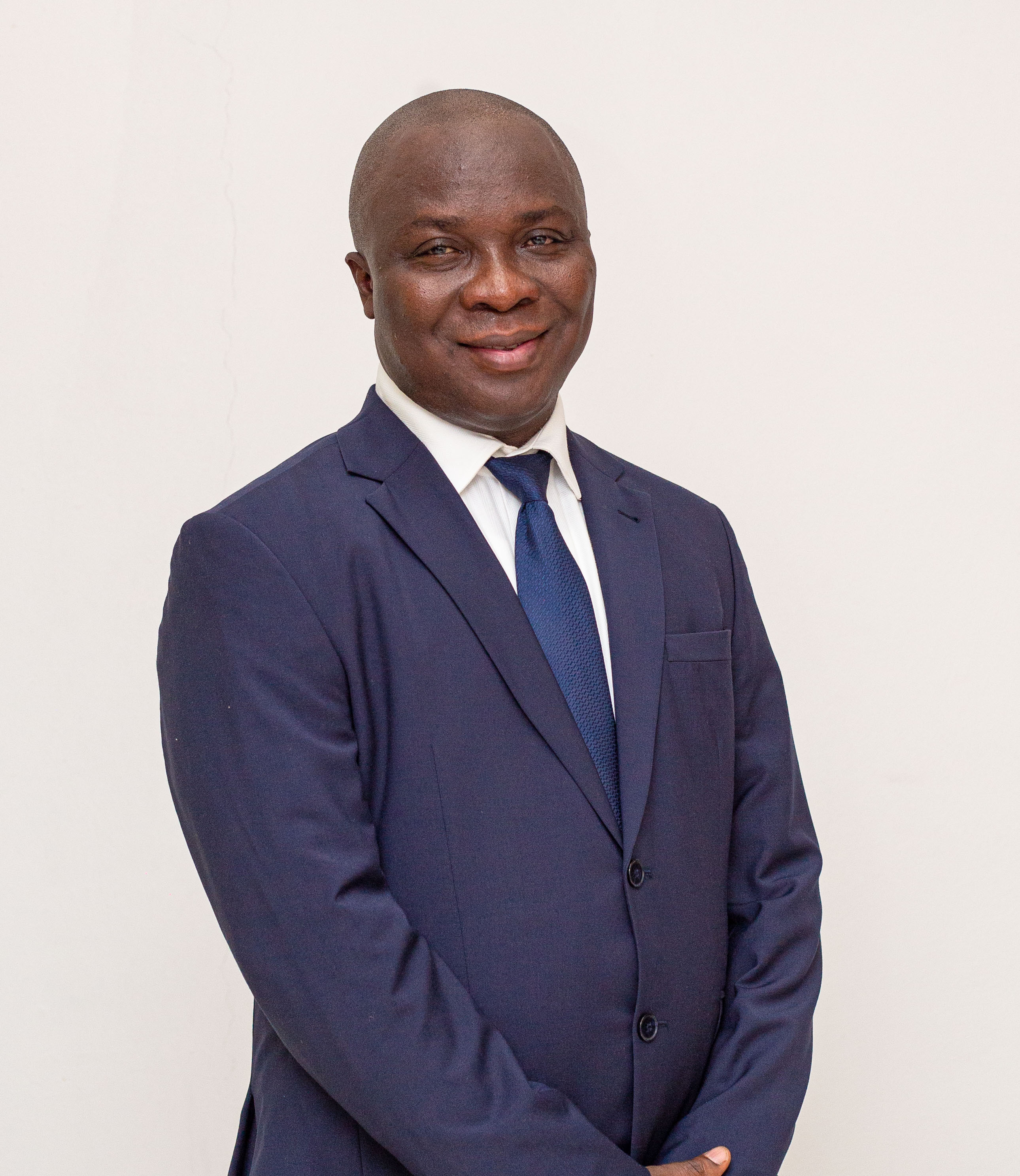
- Born: Nathaniel Boso; Penyi, Volta Region
- Occupations: Academic; international marketing strategist; Writer

Academic background
- Education: St. Augustine’s College, Cape Coast
- Alma mater: University of Ghana

Academic work
- Discipline: Marketing
- Institutions: Kwame Nkrumah University of Science and Technology

Nathaniel Boso is a Ghanaian academic, corporate, and international marketing strategist. Currently, he is serving as the chairman of O.R. Tambo Africa Research at the Department of Marketing and Corporate Strategy, Kwame Nkrumah University of Science and Technology.

== Early life and education ==
Nathaniel Boso started his basic education at St. Anthony Primary School at Penyi, Volta Region, where he engaged in trading activities at the border by selling yam and participating in currency exchange. In 1990, Boso moved to Cape Coast for his junior high school education at AME Zion Junior High School, followed by his secondary level education at St. Augustine’s College in 1992, from which he graduated in 1994.

He proceeded to the University of Ghana to study BA Business Administration, specializing in marketing. He gained a scholarship to pursue a master’s degree in industrial marketing at Umeå University in Sweden.

After completing his master's, Boso pursued a PhD in International Marketing and Entrepreneurship at Loughborough University in the UK, which he completed in 2011.

== Career ==
Currently, Boso serves as an international marketing and strategy professor and heads the O.R. Tambo Africa Research at the Department of Marketing and Corporate Strategy at Kwame Nkrumah University of Science and Technology. He is also the Dean of KNUST School of Business

Before joining KNUST, Boso held positions as an associate professor of marketing at the University of Leeds in the UK and a visiting research scholar at the University of Sydney in Australia. Additionally, he serves as a visiting professor to Strathmore University in Kenya, the University of Kigali in Rwanda, and the University of Pretoria in South Africa.
