= Nana Asaase =

Ghanaian poet and writer

- Born: Philip Boakye Dua Oyinka; Koforidua, Ghana
- Education: University of Ghana
- Alma mater: St. Augustine's College (Cape Coast)

Philip Boakye Dua Oyinka, popularly known as Nana Asaase is a poet, literary coach and writer. He is also a member of the National Folklore Board. He was born on 12 December and comes from Koforidua in the Eastern Region of Ghana. Nana Asaase, a name which means "King of the Earth" in the Akan dialect Twi, was conferred on him by his grandmother. He blends English with Twi.

== Education ==
For his secondary education, Nana Asaase attended St. Augustine's College, Cape Coast. In 2010, he was awarded a bachelor's degree in English and History from the University of Ghana, Legon.

== Career ==
He was a public relations assistant at Saatchi & Saatchi from 2010 to 2011. In 2011, he became the public relations executive at Global Media Alliance for a year and is currently a literary coach at Asaase Inscription. As of December 2022, he was serving his second term as the Secretary of the Ghana National Folklore Board's governing board. He holds the Digital Reading ambassadorial role for the Ghana Library App.

He is also a board member of the Open Foundation for West Africa (OFWA).

== List of his poetry works ==
- Life of Colours-Sancho Ignites
- Communion of Lies
- Sternly to the Day; Gently to the Earth
- Intoxicated Mirrors-London on fire
- Ephiphania
- Mental Pictures V

== Mental Pictures ==
He organises the annual Mental Pictures with the recent been Mental Pictures VIII: Bagyina Reloaded.

== Awards and recognition ==
He was acknowledged for his contributions in putting Ghanaian poetry in the limelight. This was at the first edition of the Ghana Writers Awards.
