= West African College of Physicians =

West African medical college

- Abbreviation: WACP
- Formation: 1976; 50 years ago
- Type: Professional Association
- Headquarters: Lagos, Nigeria
- Location: West Africa
- Official language: English; French
- Website: West African College of Physicians

The West African College of Physicians is a professional society, founded in 1976, for medical specialists in the West African sub-region. The association promotes postgraduate specialist training, professional curriculum development and fellowship certification in six sub-specialties or faculties, Community Health, Family Medicine, Internal Medicine, Paediatrics, Psychiatry and Laboratory Medicine, specifically concentrations in Anatomical Pathology, Chemical Pathology, Haematology and Medical Microbiology. The College also serves as a health policy advisor to many participating governments in West Africa.

== History ==
Established in 1976, the West African College of Physicians has its headquarters in Lagos, Nigeria. In the early days, membership of the College was limited to the five Anglophone countries of West Africa: Ghana, Liberia, Nigeria, Sierra Leone and The Gambia. Fellowships are categorised by chapters based in 8 member-nations including Cote d’Ivoire, The Gambia, Ghana, Liberia, Nigeria, Benin, Senegal and Sierra Leone. Membership is now available for medical doctors in Francophone countries. Overall, current members nations include Benin, Burkina Faso, Cape Verde, Côte d'Ivoire, Ghana, Guinea, Guinea-Bissau, Liberia, Mali, Niger, Nigeria, Senegal, Sierra Leone and The Gambia. The College has plans to expand medical outreach and development initiatives in the two Lusophone member states, Cape Verde and Guinea-Bissau.

The College’s sister institution is the West African College of Surgeons, a professional society for surgeons in West Africa. It also has strategic partnerships with the National Postgraduate Medical College of Nigeria, the Ghana College of Physicians and Surgeons and the Medical Research Council in The Gambia. There is educational and scientific collaboration between the West African College of Physicians and Britain’s Royal Medical Colleges especially the Royal College of Physicians of London, the American College of Physicians and the South African Medical College. The Annual General and Scientific Meetings are rotated among the 14 member-nations of the College. From time to time, the College embarks on a five-year strategic plan to set health services delivery objectives for the organisation.

== College structure ==
Atop the College’s committee hierarchy is the College Council superintends the Finance and General-Purpose Committee which in turn has oversight of the Education and Research Committee, Accreditation Committee, Examination Committee, International Office/Committee and the Quality Assurance Committee. The Faculties/Faculty Boards report to the Education and Research Committee.

At the administrative level, the President is the Head of the College assisted by the Vice Presidency. Below that level is the Secretary-General and Treasurer who supervise the Administrative Officer, Examination Officer and the Accountant. The Vice Presidency consists of eight Vice Presidents who double as Chairpersons for the national chapters. In each member country, the National Treasurer and National Secretary report to the Vice President/Chapter Chairman. The National Secretary oversees the Chapter Faculties.

=== Faculties ===
The six faculties of the College are:

- Community Health
- Family Medicine
- Internal Medicine
- Paediatrics
- Psychiatry
- Laboratory Medicine with options in Anatomical Pathology, Chemical Pathology, Haematology and Medical Microbiology

=== Medical publications ===
The West African College of Physicians, together with the West African College of Surgeons, co-own the West African Journal of Medicine, with the aim of "providing a medium for international dissemination of information about medical science in West Africa and elsewhere." Additionally, the College publishes the Proceedings of its Annual College Lectures as well as other symposia and scientific conferences.

=== Fellowship examinations ===
To be awarded a fellowship in a faculty of the WACP, a candidate must satisfactorily pass the Part I and Part II examinations and complete a clinical rotational training at an accredited institution as well as a written dissertation.

=== College prizes ===
The following academic prizes are awarded to outstanding graduating Fellows of the College:

Prize	Description
Ayo Iyun Prize	For the best Part I Candidate in Internal Medicine
A. F. B. Mabadeje Prize	For the best Dissertation in Internal Medicine
S. F. Kuku’s President Prize	For the best Graduating Fellow in the College
S. F. Kuku’s Chairman’s Prize	For the best Part II Candidate in Internal Medicine
Egerton Luke Prize	For the best Part I Candidate in Psychiatry
Awoonor-Renner Prize	For the best Dissertation in Laboratory Medicine
A. O. Senbanjo’s Prize	For the best Graduating Fellow in Family Medicine
Tom Thatcher Prize	For the best Part II Dissertation in Family Medicine
Asuquo Antia Memorial Prize	For the best Part I Candidate in Paediatrics
A. B. O. O. Oyediran Prize	For the best Part I Candidate in Community Health
Olubunmi Robbin-Coker Prize	For the best Dissertation in Paediatrics
Manuwa-Olumide Prize	For the best Part II Candidate in Community Health
Professor A. C. Ikenne Prize	For the best candidate in Cardiology Sub-specialty Examination of the Faculty of Internal Medicine

== College leadership ==
=== Presidents ===
President	Tenure of office	Country of origin
J. O. Mabayoje	1976–1978	Nigeria
J. N. Togba	1979–1980	Liberia
J. V. O. Mends	1981–1982	Sierra Leone
E. F. B. Forster	1983–1984	Ghana
J. J. N'dow	1985–1986	The Gambia
A. Binite	1987–1988	Nigeria
J. M. Bankole-Arret	1989–1990	Liberia
D. J. O.Robbin-Coker	1991–1992	Sierra Leone
J. K. Bandoh	1993–1994	Ghana
F. S. Oldfield	1995–1996	The Gambia
S. F. Kuku	1997–1998	Nigeria
E. M. F. Luke	1999–2000	Sierra Leone
V. E. Sirleaf	2001–2002	Liberia
J. K. Acquaye	2003–2004	Ghana
T. Corrah	2005–2006	The Gambia
Ro.A. Makanjuola	2007–2008	Nigeria
Patrick Coker	2009–2010	Sierra Leone
Benson S Barh	2011–2012	Liberia
Yao Tettey	2013–2014	Ghana
Kalifa Bojang	2015–2016	The Gambia
Ifeoma Egbuonu	2017–2018	Nigeria
Houenou Agbo Yveline	2019–2020	Cote D’ivoire
Radcliffe Durodami Lisk	2021–2022	Sierra Leone
Rose Jallah Macauley	2023 - 2024	Liberia
Mourtala Ka	2025 - Present	Senegal

=== Secretaries-general ===
Secretary-general	Tenure of office	Country of origin
J. O. M. Pobee	1977–1980	Ghana
A. B. O. Oyediran	1981–1983	Nigeria
H. O. Adewoye	1984–1987	Nigeria
A. Iyun	1988	Nigeria
R. O. A. Makanjuola	1989 – 1992	Nigeria
A. F. Bella	1993 – 1994	Nigeria
Kike Osinusi	1995 – 1998	Nigeria
T. Ipadeola	1999 – 2000	Nigeria
Y. Tettey	2001 – 2002	Ghana
J. O. Ogunbiyi	2003 – 2004	Nigeria
T. K. Caiquo	2005 – 2006	Ghana
F. E. A Lesi	2007 – 2010	Nigeria
Bernard Nkum	2011–2014	Ghana
Clement Ezechukwu	2015–2018	Nigeria
Albert Akpalu	2019–2022	Ghana
Prudence Wachinou	2023 - 2024	Benin
Musa Dankyau	2025 - Present	Nigeria

=== Treasurers ===
College treasurer	Tenure of office	Country of origin
F. S. J. Oldfield	1978–1982	The Gambia
D. A. Olatubosun	1983–1986	Nigeria
S. N. Afoakwa	1987–1988	Ghana
Tolu Odugbemi	1989–1992	Nigeria
A. E. Ohwovoriole	1993–1996	Nigeria
P. K. Nyame	1997–2000	Ghana
I. Egbuonu	2001–2004	Nigeria
Ngozi F. Onyia	2005–2006	Nigeria
Mercy Ablorh-Odjidja	2007–2010	Ghana
Kofo Odusote	2011–2014	Nigeria
Adabayeri Victoria May	2015–2018	Ghana
Enobong Ikpeme	2019–2022	Nigeria
Yvonne Dei-Adomakoli	2023 - 2024	Ghana
Barbara Otaigbe	2025 - Present	Nigeria
