= Yvette Adounvo Atekpe =

Ghanaian business executive

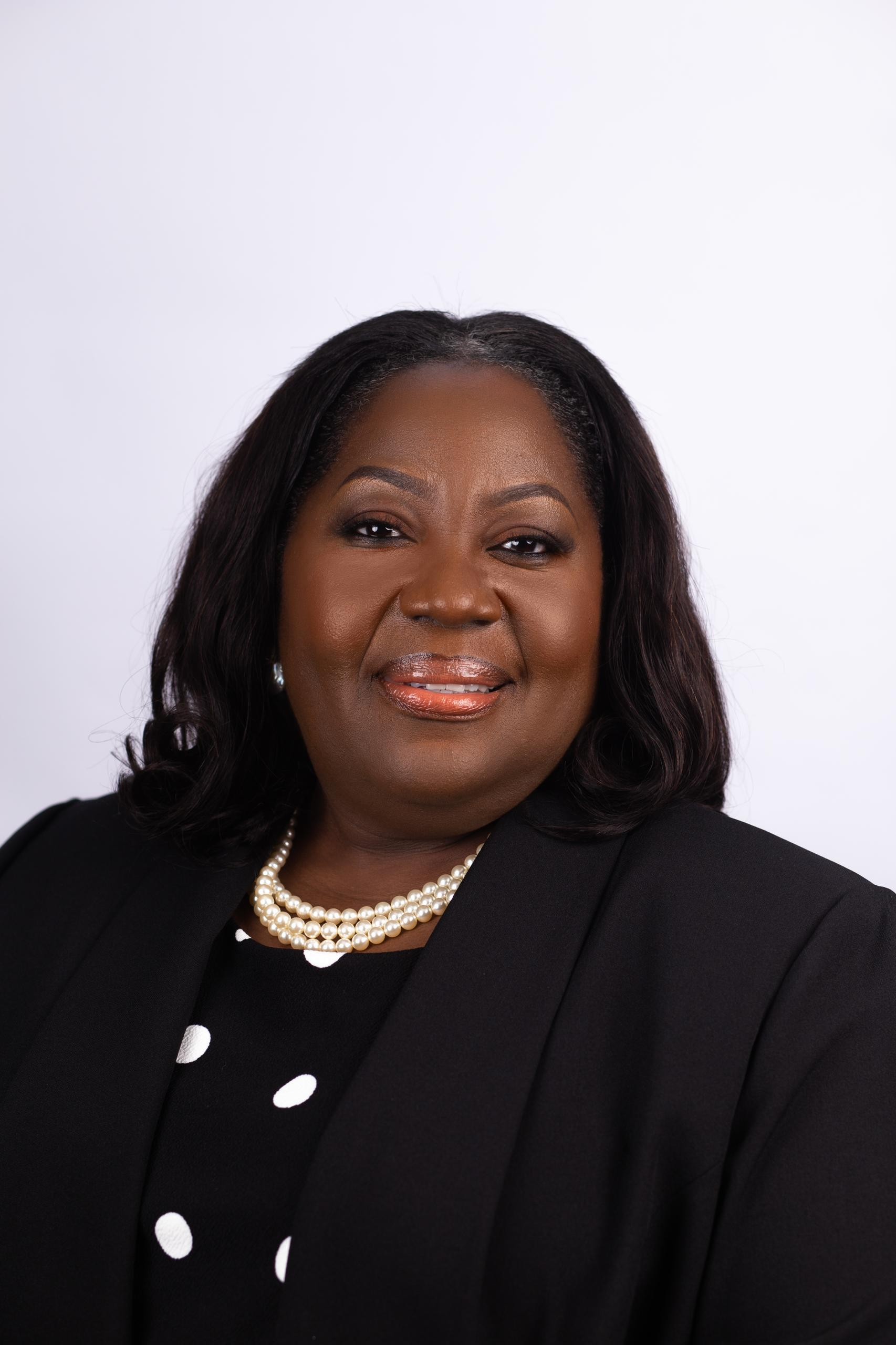
- Yvette Adounvo Atekpe in 2024
- Born: Ghana
- Education: Holy Child School
- Alma mater: University of Ghana, GIMPA, Maastricht School of Management
- Occupation: Business executive
- Known for: CEO of Dynamic Data Solutions LTD (dds55)
- Awards: CIMG Marketing Woman of the Year (2017), ICT Woman of the Year (2014)

Yvette Adounvo Atekpe is a Ghanaian business executive and technology leader, best known as the founder and Chief Executive Officer of Dynamic Data Solutions Ltd (dds55), a Ghana-based information and communications technology company. She has worked in the ICT sector for over two decades, holding senior leadership roles across several multinational firms in Ghana’s evolving digital landscape.

== Early life and education ==
Atekpe completed her secondary education at Holy Child School in Cape Coast. She is reported to have studied at the University of Ghana, where she pursued a degree in sociology, and later obtained professional certifications from the Ghana Institute of Management and Public Administration (GIMPA) and the Maastricht School of Management in the Netherlands.

== Career ==
Atekpe began her career in Ghana’s telecommunications sector with Celltel Telecommunications. She later held key positions at Africa Online and Accelon, which was acquired by Dimension Data and rebranded as Internet Solutions Ghana. She served as Managing Director for both companies, leading strategic transformation efforts. In 2021, she led a management buyout of Internet Solutions Ghana, resulting in the formation of Dynamic Data Solutions Ltd (dds55), a wholly Ghanaian-owned ICT firm. Under her leadership, dds55 has expanded its services to include managed connectivity, cloud computing, cybersecurity, and enterprise IT support.

== Advocacy and mentorship ==
Atekpe has supported several initiatives focused on increasing digital skills among underrepresented groups, particularly women and girls in STEM. She has collaborated with the Ministry of Communications and the International Telecommunication Union (ITU) on Girls in ICT and digital literacy programmes. She has also been featured in programmes such as StanChart’s “Women in Technology” initiative.

== Recognition and awards ==
In 2008, Atekpe was named a Fellow of the African Leadership Initiative. She was awarded ICT Woman of the Year in 2014 and Industry Personality of the Year in 2016 at the Ghana Telecom Awards. In 2017, she was named Marketing Woman of the Year by the Chartered Institute of Marketing Ghana (CIMG). She received the Lifetime Achievement Award at the 2024 Ghana Information Technology and Telecom Awards (GITTA). She has also been listed among Africa’s Top 100 Women CEOs by Reset Global People and Pulse.

== Legacy and impact ==
Atekpe has become a key figure in Ghana’s ICT development efforts. She regularly contributes to public discourse on the intersection of technology, leadership, and inclusive innovation.
