= Michael Kwasi Osei =

Ghanaian politician and teacher

Michael Kwasi Ossei

Deputy Minister

Information
- In office 1969 to 1970

Works and Housing
- In office 1971 to 1972
- President: Kofi Abrefa Busia

Personal details
- Born: 16 July 1918 Koforidua, Eastern Region, Gold Coast
- Died: 1 August 1982 (aged 64) Koforidua, Ghana
- Party: Progress Party
- Spouse: Alexcia Pat-Williams
- Children: 9,
- Education: St. Augustine's College
- Profession: Academic

Michael Kwasi Ossei was a Ghanaian politician and was a member of the first parliament of the second Republic of Ghana. He represented the Koforidua constituency under the membership of the Progress Party (PP).

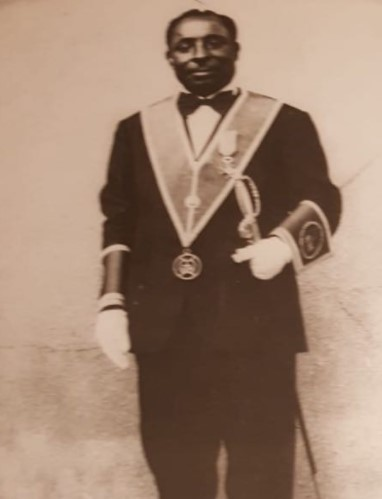
Michael Kwasi Ossei in his ceremonial Catholic Knighthood attire

== Early life and education ==
Michael Kwesi Ossei was born on 16 July 1918 in the Eastern region of Ghana. He attended Koforidua Methodist School now Koforidua Effiduase Methodist School, Koforidua, Ghana where he obtained his Teachers' Training Certificate. He then moved to Cape Coast to advance his education at St. Augustine's College, Cape Coast, Ghana where he obtained his Bachelor of Arts degree. He worked as a teacher before going into parliament.

He worked as a teacher, and headmaster of the Catholic Primary School for years and was popularly known as "Master Ossei. Which become his mantle. He married Alexcia Pat-Williams and had 9 children

He became very active in the National Liberation Movement which was founded in 1954 before Ghana gained its independence. The NLM was set up by disaffected Ashanti members of the Convention People's Party, who were joined by Kofi Abrefa Busia, the NLM opposed the process of centralization whilst supporting a continuing role for traditional leaders. Nicknamed the "Natemeho" The group openly opposed Dr Kwame Nkrumah’s introduction of a 1 party state and the introduction of political Socialism into Ghana

== Politics ==
Michael Kwasi Ossei stood as a candidate for the National Liberation Movement, and were nicknamed "Domo" (Demo) by Dr Kwame Nkrumah"s CPP majority.

However, After Ghana attained its independence on 6 March 1957, the Parliament of Ghana passed the Avoidance of Discrimination Act, 1957 (C.A. 38), which banned all parties and organizations that were confined to or identifiable to any racial, ethnic or religious groups with effect form 31 December 1957

This law meant that all the existing political parties would become illegal. These parties included the Northern People's Party, Muslim Association Party, National Liberation Movement (NLM), Anlo Youth Organization, Togoland Congress and the Ga Shifimokpee.[2]

Due to his position in the NLM Ossei was detained together with other opposition candidates and sent to Nsawam prison for several months.

Once Nkrumah was deposed in a Coup d'etat in 1966, Michael Kwasi Ossei was appointed Chairman of The Koforidua Municipal Council. The NLM reorganised and now called itself Progress Party, (PP.). Ossei again stood as candidate for the PP and won. Becoming the MP for Koforidua constituency. In 1969, the PP won the parliamentary elections with 105 of the 140 seats. To form the government of Ghana. He was appointed Deputy Minister for Information, then later for the combined ministries of Works and Housing. A position he held until 1972 when the PP and Busia government were overthrown in a military coup by Colonel Ignatius Kutu Acheampong

Michael Kwasi Ossei began his political career in 1969 when he became the parliamentary candidate for the Progress Party (PP) to represent the Koforidua constituency prior to the commencement of the 1969 Ghanaian parliamentary election. He assumed office as a member of the first parliament of the second Republic of Ghana on 1 October 1969 after being a pronounced winner at the 1969 Ghanaian parliamentary election. His tenure ended on 13 January 1972.
