= Ghana College of Physicians and Surgeons =

Ghanaian medical college

- Abbreviation: GCPS
- Formation: 2003; 23 years ago
- Type: Professional Association
- Headquarters: Accra, Ghana
- Location: West Africa
- Official language: English
- Website: gcps.edu.gh

The Ghana College of Physicians and Surgeons is a national postgraduate medical college established to train specialist doctors in medicine, surgery and other related disciplines by an Act of parliament in 2003.

== History ==
Prior to the founding of the college in 2003, there were no facilities available in Ghana to train specialist doctors. Doctors who required training in specific fields had to do so outside the country through the West African College of Physicians and the West African College of Surgeons which were both located in Nigeria. Others sought training in other areas such as South Africa, the United States of America and the United Kingdom. This resulted in a high attrition rate especially in the case of medical practitioners that trained abroad on scholarships as many did not return to practise in the country. In an effort to curb the situation of brain-drain in the country, the Ghana Medical Association, health professionals, Ministers of health and various stakeholders in the country's health sector pushed for the establishment of a post graduate medical college in the country in the year 2000. A task force chaired by Professor George W. Brobby was set up in 2000 to make recommendations for the establishment of the National Postgraduate Medical College. An acting rector of the College of Physicians and Surgeons in the name of Paul K. Nyame was appointed in 2001 to establish a secretariat for the college. The college was inaugurated in 9 December 2003 by the then President John Agyekum Kufuor with Professor Samuel Ofosu-Amaah as the first President and Chairman of Council, Professor Paul K. Nyame as the Rector and Prof George W. Brobby as Vice-Rector of the college. The college started with an initial intake of sixty-four students. In September 2004, the first batch of residents were enrolled into the college. They graduated in September 2007. They were inducted as members of the Ghana College of Physicians and Surgeons in December 2007.

== Programs ==
The college has the mandate to organise training programmes, conduct exams, award certificates, influence health policy and undertake Continuous Professional Development (CPD). The College has 15 Faculties. Doctors who enroll in the college are run through a three-year membership program which qualifies them as specialists. They then study for two or three additional years depending on their specialty. Programs available for membership and fellowship for physicians include; Family Medicine, Internal Medicine, Laboratory Medicine, Paediatrics and Child Health, Psychiatry, Public Health, Radiology, Oncology Radiation. For surgeons the programs are as follows; Anaesthesia, Paediatrics/Child Health, Dental Surgery and Subspecialties, Emergency Medicine, Otorhinolaryngology, Obstetrics & Gynaecology, Ophthalmology, Surgery and Subspecialties. The college also organises a modular membership programme in family medicine: accredited district hospitals are used as training centres to help train district doctors in family medicine.

== Training centres and sites ==
The college uses various training centres to train specialists. Some of these include; the Korle-Bu Teaching Hospital, the Komfo Anokye Teaching Hospital, the Tamale Teaching Hospital, the Cape Coast Teaching Hospital, the 37 Military Hospital, the Tetteh Quarshie Memorial Hospital, the Greater Accra Regional Hospital, the Accra Psychiatric Hospital and the Brong Ahafo Regional Hospital.

The college also has training sites at the Princess Marie Louis Children's Hospital, the Koforidua Regional Hospital, the La General Hospital and the Volta River Authority (VRA) Hospital.

The college has also accredited private specialist facilities to train its doctors in an attempt to expand its program. These facilities include; FOCUS Hospital, Nyaho Medical Centre, Lister Hospital and the Tema Women's Hospital.

== External connections ==
The college fosters relationships with other like institutions for mutual support and benefits. The college has forged linkages with University of Michigan, United States of America. The university supports the college with the development of new programmes to suit the nation's needs. The college is also linked with the Ghana Physicians and Surgeons Foundation in North America; an association of Ghanaians practising in North America. These doctors assist the college with expertise and funding for the external rotation of residents of the College. The college is also linked with the Ghana Doctors and Dentists Association in the United Kingdom. The purpose of this relationship is to enrich the college's programmes by tapping into the knowledge of the doctors of the association while using their members as resource persons and trainers at the college.
