= The Spelling Bee =

Annual spelling bee held in the Ghana

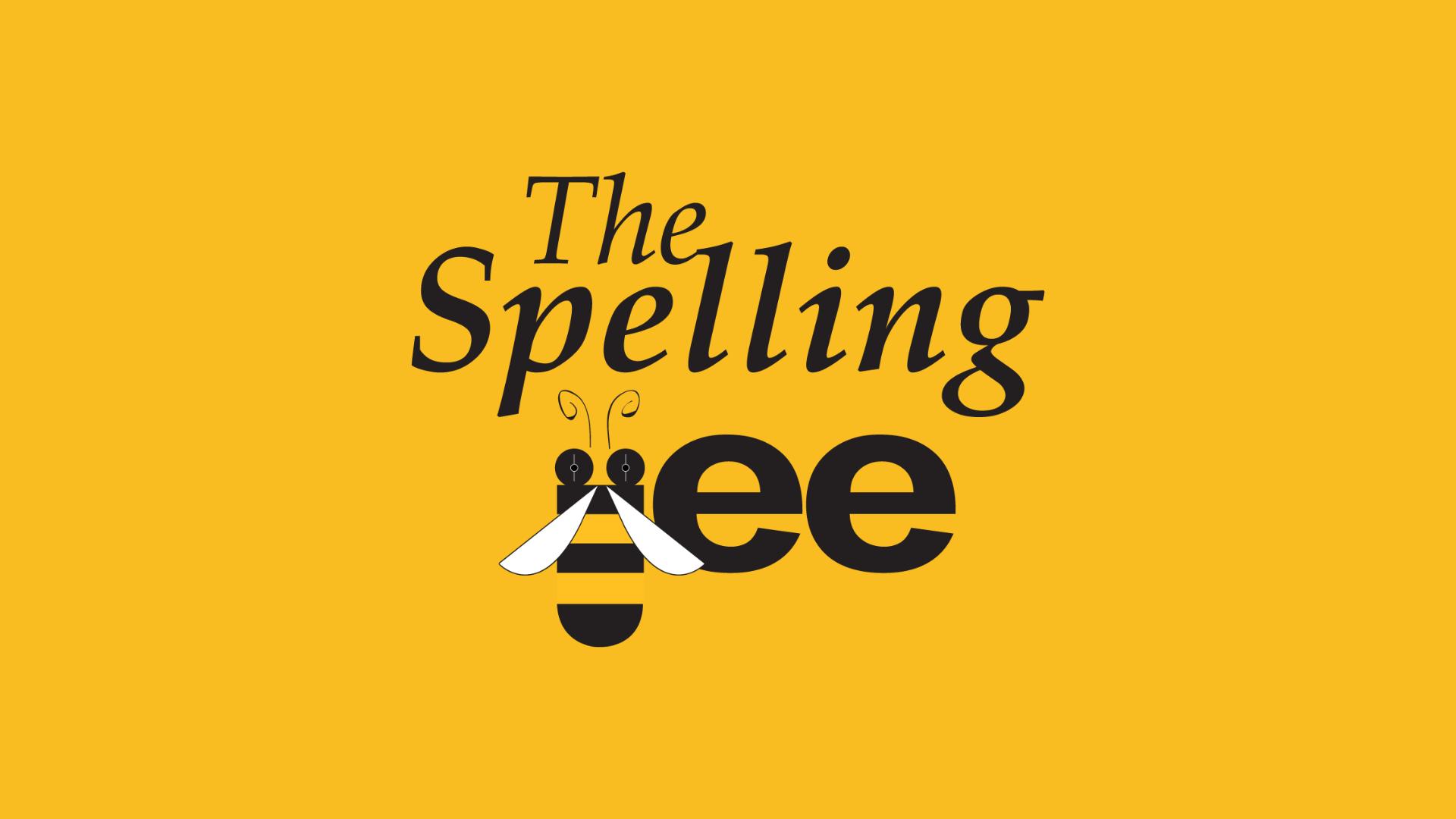
- Genre: Spelling bee
- Frequency: Annual (1st Saturday of February)
- Location: Ghana
- Inaugurated: 2007
- Website: Official website

The Spelling Bee (commonly called The Spelling Bee Ghana or TSB) is an annual spelling bee held in Ghana since 2007.

The competition is run by a not-for-profit charity founded by Ghanaian Entrepreneur, CEO of the Young Educators Foundation, Eugenia Tachie-Menson, Programmes Manager, Salomé Dzakpasu, School Coordinator, Johnson Appiah and assisted by a team of educators, professionals, and volunteers.

The Spelling Bee, targeted at students between the ages of 7 – 13, seeks to build their capacity on the rudiments of spelling and English language usage.

The Spelling Bee is a franchise of Scripps National Spelling Bee run in the United States.

Since its inception, the winners of the competition have represented Ghana at the annual Scripps National Spelling Bee.

== History ==
The Spelling Bee began in 2007 with only six schools taking part. Maria Isabel Kubabom from SOS Herman Gmeiner School, Tema won the first edition by successfully spelling “Denigratory” and proceeded to the US to represent Ghana in the international competition.

Maria's appearance at the 80th Scripps National Spelling Bee made history as the first time an African participated in this international contest. For almost two decades, Ghana was the only African country participating in this prestigious international competition until 2025, where Nigeria also participated.

The Spelling Bee has evolved; for instance, since March 2020, at the start of the 16th edition, the 4-tiered spelling program has been conducted both virtually and in-person, with the Preliminaries, Quarter-Finals being done virtually and the Semi-Finals and National-Finals taking place in-person.

Originally with only a seat at the Scripps National Spelling Bee, since 2022, The Spelling Bee has secured two additional seats where two high-performing spellers (known in the competition's jargon as Yellow Bees) join the Champion for the Scripps Bee.

=== History-making Spellers ===
- Maria Kubabom: 1st ever champion (2008)
- Philemon Awan: 1st Champion from Ho (2012)
- Afua Ansah: 1st speller from Ghana to make it to the Scripps Bee finals (2016)
- Shifa Amankwa-Gabbey: 1st champion from Kumasi and 1st Speller to appear on CNN’s African Voices (2018)
- Kwabena Darko-Asare: made it to the top 100 at the Scripps Bee (2019)
- N’Adom Darko-Asare: 1st speller to win the competition for two consecutive years (2022 & 2023)

== Partners and Sponsors ==
The Spelling Bee has been sponsored and supported over the years by Indomie Ghana, MTN Ghana, US Embassy in Ghana, USAID, MultiChoice Ghana, Kenya Airways, GOIL PLC, Ashesi University, Rufus Green Parks, Otumfuo Osei Tutu II Foundation, Citi 97.3 FM/Citi TV, Business and Financial Times, and many others.

== List of winners ==
| Edition | Year | Winners | Championship word | School | Location |
|---|---|---|---|---|---|
| 1st | 2008 | Maria Isabel Yirebatiya Kubabom | Denigratory | SOS Herman Gmeinner School | Tema, Greater Accra |
| 2nd | 2009 | Nana Adjoa Baiden-Amissah | Bombilation | Crown Prince Academy | Accra, Greater Accra Region |
| 3rd | 2010 | Darren Sackey | Roulade | Achimota Basic School | Achimota, Greater Accra Region |
| 4th | 2011 | Jessica Penu | Velocipede | Angel Specialist School | Tema, Greater Accra |
| 5th | 2012 | Philemon Apiente Awan | Mariculture | Holy Spirit Catholic Preparatory School | Ho, Volta Region |
| 6th | 2013 | Rohit Sahijwani | Jicama | Delhi Public School (DPS) International Ghana | Tema, Greater Accra Region |
| 7th | 2014 | Khushi Jeswani | Olestra | Delhi Public School (DPS) International Ghana | Tema, Greater Accra Region |
| 8th | 2015 | Vishal Mukesh Thakwani | Xiphias | Delhi Public School (DPS) International Ghana | Tema, Greater Accra Region |
| 9th | 2016 | Afua Manukure Ansah | Zanni | Ridge Church School | Accra, Greater Accra Region |
| 10th | 2017 | Lily Tugbah | Baculiform | Solidarity International School | Ashaiman, Greater Accra Region |
| 11th | 2018 | Shifa Amankwa-Gabbey | Wamara | Nagie's Angels Educational Centre | Kumasi, Ashanti Region |
| 12th | 2019 | Kwabena Adu Darko-Asare | Baldenfreude | Delhi Public School (DPS) International Ghana | Tema, Greater Accra Region |
| 13th | 2020 | Nadia Chelpang Mashoud | Empanoply | Alhassan Gbanzaba Memorial School | Tamale, Northern Region |
| 14th | 2021 | Naa Koshie Manyo-Plange | Amaxophobia | Roman Ridge School | Accra, Greater Accra Region |
| 15th | 2022 | N’Adom Darko-Asare | Bathypelagic | DPS International Ghana | Tema, Greater Accra Region |
| 16th | 2023 | N’Adom Darko-Asare | Douroucouli | DPS International Ghana | Tema, Greater Accra Region |
| 17th | 2024 | Giovanni Adjei | Guijo | Christ The King International School | Accra, Greater Accra Region |
| 18th | 2025 | Giovanni Adjei | Fruticose | Christ The King International School | Accra, Greater Accra Region |
| 19th | 2026 | Eugene Osei Mensah | Breviloquent | Peniel Academy | Kumasi, Ashanti Region |

== See also ==
- Spelling bee
- Scripps National Spelling Bee
