= Hess (surname) =

Hess or Heß, a German and Ashkenazi surname, meaning somebody originally from the region of Hesse. Two alternative origins have been reported. Usage in the south of Germany may arise from a contraction of the personal name Matthäus.

Notable people who share this surname include:

- Adam Hess (basketball) (born 1981), American basketball player
- Adam Hess (comedian), British comedian
- Alexander Hess (1898–1981), Czechoslovak war pilot part of No. 310 Squadron RAF
- András Hess, Hungarian printer
- Arthur Hess (SA general) (1891–1959), German SA general and politician
- Beat W. Hess (born 1949), Swiss businessman
- Bernhard Hess (born 1966), Swiss politician
- Bernhard von Hess (1792–1869), Bavarian Lieutenant General and War Minister
- Carl von Hess (1863–1923), German ophthalmologist
- Catherina Hess, (born 1985), German actress
- Charles R. Hess (1858–1928), American politician from Ohio
- Damian Hess aka MC Frontalot, nerdcore rapper
- Dean Hess (1917–2015), American Air Force Colonel
- Derek Hess, (born 1964), American artist
- Elizabeth Hess (born 1953), Canadian actress
- Elmar Hess (born 1966), German artist
- Erika Hess (born 1962), Swiss alpine skier
- Ernst Hess (1893–1917), German World War I flying ace
- Ernst Hess (composer) (1912-1968), Swiss conductor, composer and musicologist
- Ernst Moritz Hess (1890-1983), German soldier, judge, railway administrator, and holocaust survivor
- Fred Hess (1944–2018), American jazz musician
- Fred Hess (Wisconsin) (1858–1925), American politician
- Fred J. Hess (1848–1928), American politician
- Germain Henri Hess (1802–1850), Russian-Swiss chemist
- Greg Hess (born 1962), 16th president of Wabash College
- Hans-Georg Hess (1923–2008), German U-boat captain
- Harry Hammond Hess (1906–1969), American geologist
- Harry Hess, American college sports coach
- Harvey Hess (1939–2012), American lyric poet
- Heinrich von Heß (1788–1870), Austrian fieldmarshall
- Heinrich Maria von Hess, German painter
- Henry L. Hess (1890–1974), American politician from Oregon
- Hiester Hess (died 1922), American politician from Maryland
- Hermann Hesse (1877–1962), German-born Swiss poet, novelist, and painter
- Hieronymus Hess, Swiss drawer, painter, caricaturist (1799–1850)
- Hunter Hess (born 1998), American freestyle skier
- Ilse Hess, German writer (1900–1995)
- Jake Hess, American southern gospel vocalist
- Jared Hess (born 1979), American writer and director of Napoleon Dynamite
- Jean-Chrisostome Hess (1816–1900), French composer, pianist, and organist
- Jessica Hess (born 1981), American realist painter
- Johann Hess (Hesse), (1490–1547), German theologian
- Johann Jacob Hess (theologian) (1741–1828), Swiss theologian
- Johann Jakob Hess (politician) (1791–1857), Swiss politician
- Johann Jakob Hess (Egyptologist) (1866–1949), Swiss Egyptologist and Assyriologist
- John Jacob Hess (1584–1639), Swiss-German Anabaptist minister and martyr
- John L. Hess (1917–2005), American journalist
- Karl Hess (1923–1994), American speechwriter and author
- Karl Hess (painter) (1801–1874), German painter
- Leon Hess Founder of Hess Corporation and the New York Jets franchise
- Lyle Hess, (1912-2002) American sailboat designer
- Marilyn Hess (born 1939), American politician
- Markus Hess, German hacker
- Martin Hess (politician) (born 1971), German politician
- Michael A. Hess (1952–1995), American lawyer
- Moses Hess (1812–1875), Jewish philosopher and proto-Zionist
- Myra Hess (1890–1965), British pianist
- Nicole Hess (born 1973), German politician
- Nigel Hess, British composer
- Ortwin Hess, British optician and physicist
- Orvan Hess (1906–2002), doctor who invented the fetal heart monitor
- Paul Hess (born 1948), American politician from Kansas
- Per Hess (born 1946), Norwegian visual artist
- Peter von Hess, German painter
- Ralph Hess (born 1939), American politician from Pennsylvania
- Robert Hess (chess player), American chess grandmaster
- Robert Hess (college president) (1938–1994), American President of Brooklyn College
- Rudolf Hess (1894–1987), Deputy Führer of Nazi Germany
- Rudolf Hess (artist) (1903–1986), Californian painter and art critic
- Sara Whalen Hess (born 1976), American Olympic soccer player
- Ursula Hess (born 1946), Swiss archer
- Ursula Hess (psychologist) (born 1960), German psychologist
- Victor Francis Hess (1883–1964), Austrian-American physicist who discovered cosmic rays
- W. Dale Hess (1930–2016), American politician
- Walter Rudolf Hess (1881–1973), Swiss physiologist Nobel Prize winner
- Willy Hess (composer) (1906–1997), Swiss musicologist, composer, Beethoven scholar
- Willy Hess (violinist) (1859–1939), German famous violin virtuoso
- Wolf Rüdiger Hess (Heß) (1937–2001), German architect son of Rudolf Hess
- Kathie Hess Crouse (1969 -- ) American politician and activist

== See also ==
- Höss (surname)
- Helius Eobanus Hessus (1488–1540), German Latin poet
- The Hess Homestead
- Hesse (surname)
