= Hoss =

Hoss may refer to:

== People ==
- Hoss (surname), a list of people
- Höss (surname), a German surname, including a list of people
- Hoss (nickname), a list of people
- "Blackjack" Hoss Taylor, a professional wrestler from NWA All-Star Wrestling

== Fictional characters ==
- Hoss Cartwright, in the television western Bonanza
- Hoss Delgado, in the animated television series The Grim Adventures of Billy and Mandy
- Harry Dresden, a detective in the series The Dresden Files
- Hoss (comics), a Marvel Comics character
- Hoss, in the animated film Extinct

== Music ==
- HOSS Records, an American experimental independent record label formed in 2004
- Hoss (band), a hard rock band
- Hoss (album), Lagwagon's third album

== Sport ==
- Da Hoss, an American racehorse
- Hoss, a professional wrestling term for a wrestler who is physically large and has an aggressive style

== Other uses ==
- Hoss's Steak and Sea House, aka "Hoss's"
