= HOS =

HOS may refer to:

== Military ==
- Croatian Armed Forces (Independent State of Croatia) (Croatian: Hrvatske oružane snage), active during World War II
- Croatian Defence Forces (Croatian: Hrvatske obrambene snage), the military arm of the Croatian Party of Rights (1991–1993)

== Sports ==
- Croatian Volleyball Federation (Croatian: Hrvatski odbojkaški savez)
- Head of the Schuylkill Regatta, in Philadelphia, Pennsylvania, United States

== Other uses ==
- Book of Hosea, part of the Hebrew Bible
- Head of state
- Hearts of Space, an American radio program
- Hellenic Ornithological Society
- Heroes of the Storm, a multiplayer online video game
- Higher-order statistics
- Holt–Oram syndrome, an autosomal dominant disorder
- Home Ownership Scheme, Hong Kong
- Hornbeck Offshore Services
- Hours of service, U.S. regulations governing working hours of commercial vehicle operators
- Humanistische Omroep, a Dutch broadcaster
- Saigon Sign Language (ISO 639-3:hos)
- Sikorsky HOS, a helicopter
- Hekscher-Ohlin-Samuelson model, an extension of the Heckscher–Ohlin mathematical model of international trade

== Places ==
- Hostomel Airport

== See also ==
- Ho (disambiguation)
- Hoss (disambiguation)
