= Hesse (surname) =

Hesse is a German surname. Notable people with the surname include:

- Adolf Friedrich Hesse (1809–1863), German composer
- Adukwei Hesse, Ghanaian physician-academic, tuberculosis control expert, prison reform advocate and Presbyterian minister
- Afua Adwo Jectey Hesse, First Ghanaian woman to train as a paediatric surgeon
- Amandine Hesse (born 1993), French tennis player
- Birgit Hesse (born 1975), German politician (SPD)
- Chris Tsui Hesse (born 1932), cinematographer, filmmaker, prison reform campaigner and Presbyterian minister
- Christian Heinrich Friedrich Hesse (1772–1832), German pastor and naturalist
- Didier Hesse (1901–1974), French sports shooter
- Eva Hesse (1936–1970), painter and sculptor
- Herman Chinery-Hesse (1963–2024), Ghanaian technology entrepreneur and founder of the SOFTribe
- Hermann Hesse (1877–1962), German-born poet, novelist, and painter, Nobel Prize in Literature 1946
- Holger Hesse (1900–1967), German engineer
- Hollie Hesse, American politician
- Karen Hesse (born 1952), US writer
- Konrad Hesse (1919–2005), German jurist
- Lebrecht James Chinery-Hesse (1930–2018), Ghanaian lawyer, civil servant and diplomat
- Lebrecht Wilhelm Fifi Hesse (1934–2000), First black African Rhodes Scholar
- Linda Hesse (born 1987), German singer
- Lo Hesse (1889–1983?), German dancer
- Lucien Hesse (1866–1929), French architect
- Mary Hesse (1924–2016), US philosopher
- Mary Chinery-Hesse (born 1938), Ghanaian international civil servant and diplomat, first woman Chancellor of the University of Ghana
- Otto Hesse (1811–1874), German mathematician, known for the Hessian matrix
- Parker Hesse (born 1995), American football player
- Paul Hesse (1857–1938), German malacologist
- Regina Hesse (1832–1898), pioneer woman educator-administrator in colonial Ghana
- Richard Hesse (1868–1944), German zoologist
- Ruth Hesse (1936–2024), German operatic mezzo-soprano and contralto
- Stefan Heße (born 1966), German Roman Catholic bishop
- Tyson Hesse (born 1984), American artist
- Virginia Hesse (born 1944), Ghanaian civil servant and diplomat
- Walther Hesse (1846–1911), German microbiologist

== See also ==
- Ernst von Hesse-Wartegg (1851–1918), Austrian travel-author
- Hasse (surname)
- Hess (surname)
