= Höss (surname) =

Höss (German: [hœs]) is a German surname and can refer to several people, including:

- Maria Crescentia Höss (1682–1744), Roman Catholic saint
- Otto Höss (1897–1971), Austrian football player
- Rudolf Höss (1901-1947), SS-Obersturmbannführer and commandant of Auschwitz concentration camp

== See also ==
- Hoss (surname)
- Hess (surname)
