= Shlomo Hareli =

Israeli psychologist

Shlomo Hareli (Hebrew: שלמה הראלי; born March 14, 1964, in Haifa, Israel) is an Israeli psychologist, Full Professor of Social Psychology at the School of Business Administration at the University of Haifa. At present, he is serving as the head of the laboratory for the study of social perception of emotions.

== Education ==
Hareli received a BA in psychology and philosophy from the University of Haifa in 1992 and a Ph.D. in social psychology from the University of Haifa in 2000.

== Career ==
From 1999 to 2000 Hareli was a post-doctoral researcher at the University of California Los-Angeles working with Prof. Bernard Weiner on causal attribution research. In 2000 Hareli took a position as lecturer at Kinneret College on the Sea of Galilee and then moved to the Department of Business Administration of the University of Haifa where he held the position of associate professor of Social psychology. He served as the head of the Interdisciplinary Center for Research on Emotions until 2017 and now directs the Laboratory for the Study of Social Perception of Emotions. His research focuses on the social perception of emotions. In particular, he is interested in the way that people use the emotions of others to learn about social norms and social standards, about the character of people and their social power and competence. A related line of research focuses on social context influences on the social signal function of emotions.

Much of this work was done in collaboration with Humboldt University Prof. Ursula Hess, specifically, on the impact of context information regarding this process.

Finally, Hareli has also some interest at studying the evolutionary roots of social perception. For example, in one study Hareli tested how the shape of tree leaves surrounding houses affects its perceived value connecting it to the protective function of trees.

== Selected collaborations ==
Books that have citations listing Hareli include:

- The SAGE Encyclopedia of Educational Research, Measurement (2018)
- The Social Nature of Emotions (2016)
- The Expression of Emotion: Philosophical, Psychological and Legal (2016)
