= Králův Dvůr =

- Town
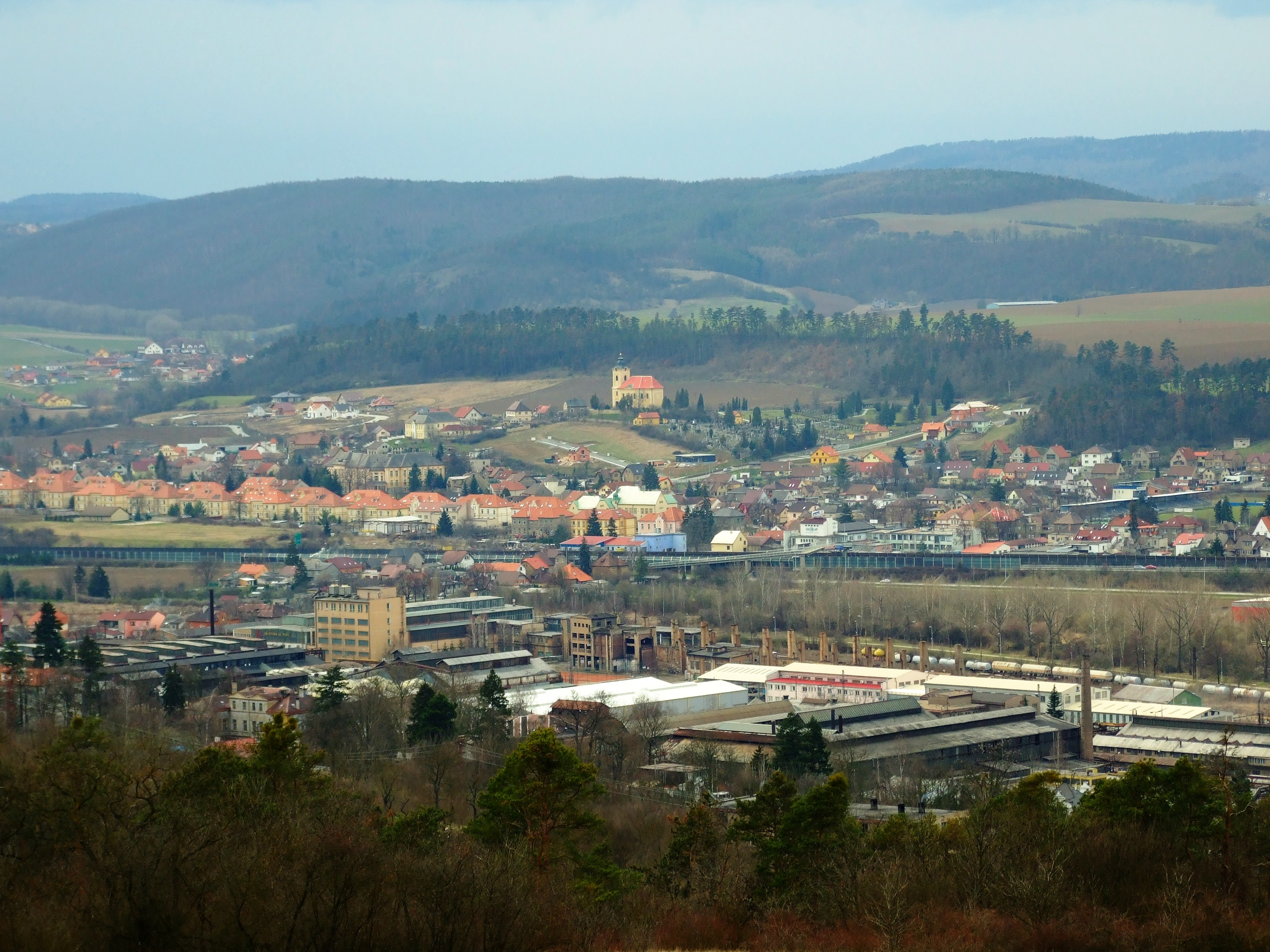
- General view of Králův Dvůr

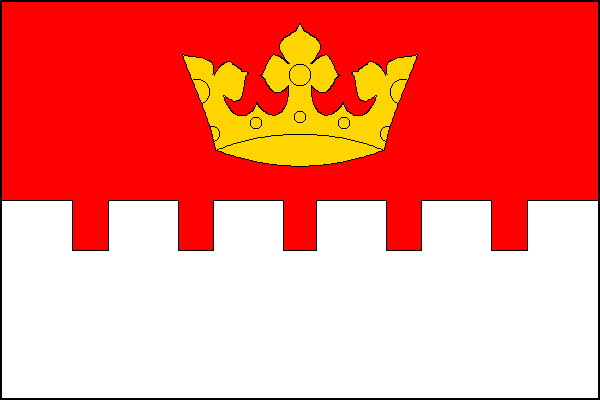
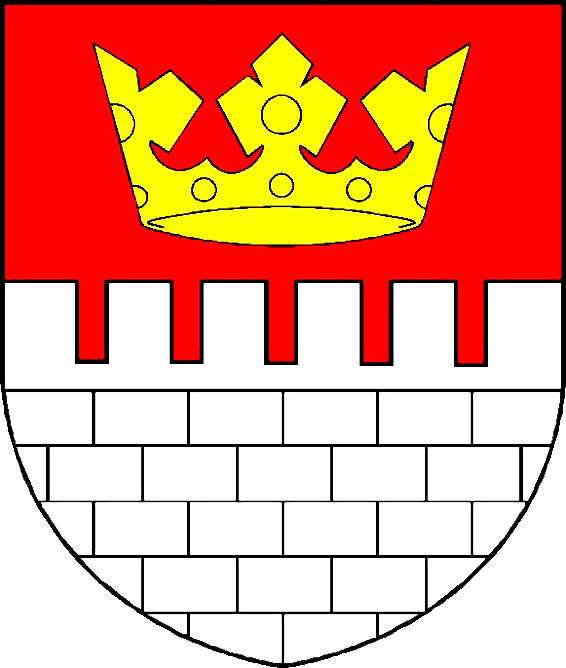
- Flag Coat of arms

- Location in the Czech Republic
- Coordinates: 49°56′48″N 14°2′6″E
- Country: Czech Republic
- Region: Central Bohemian
- District: Beroun
- First mentioned: 1394

Government
  - Mayor: Petr Vychodil (ODS)

Area
  - Total: 15.24 km^{2} (5.88 sq mi)
- Elevation: 240 m (790 ft)

Population (2026-01-01)
  - Total: 10,677
  - Density: 700.6/km^{2} (1,815/sq mi)
- Time zone: UTC+1 (CET)
  - Summer (DST): UTC+2 (CEST)
- Postal code: 267 01
- Website: www.kraluv-dvur.cz

Králův Dvůr (Czech pronunciation: [ˈkraːluːv dvuːr]; German: Königshof) is a town in Beroun District in the Central Bohemian Region of the Czech Republic. It has about 11,000 inhabitants. Králův Dvůr is located on the Litavka River and creates a conurbation with the town of Beroun. The most important monument of the town is the Králův Dvůr Castle.

== Administrative division ==
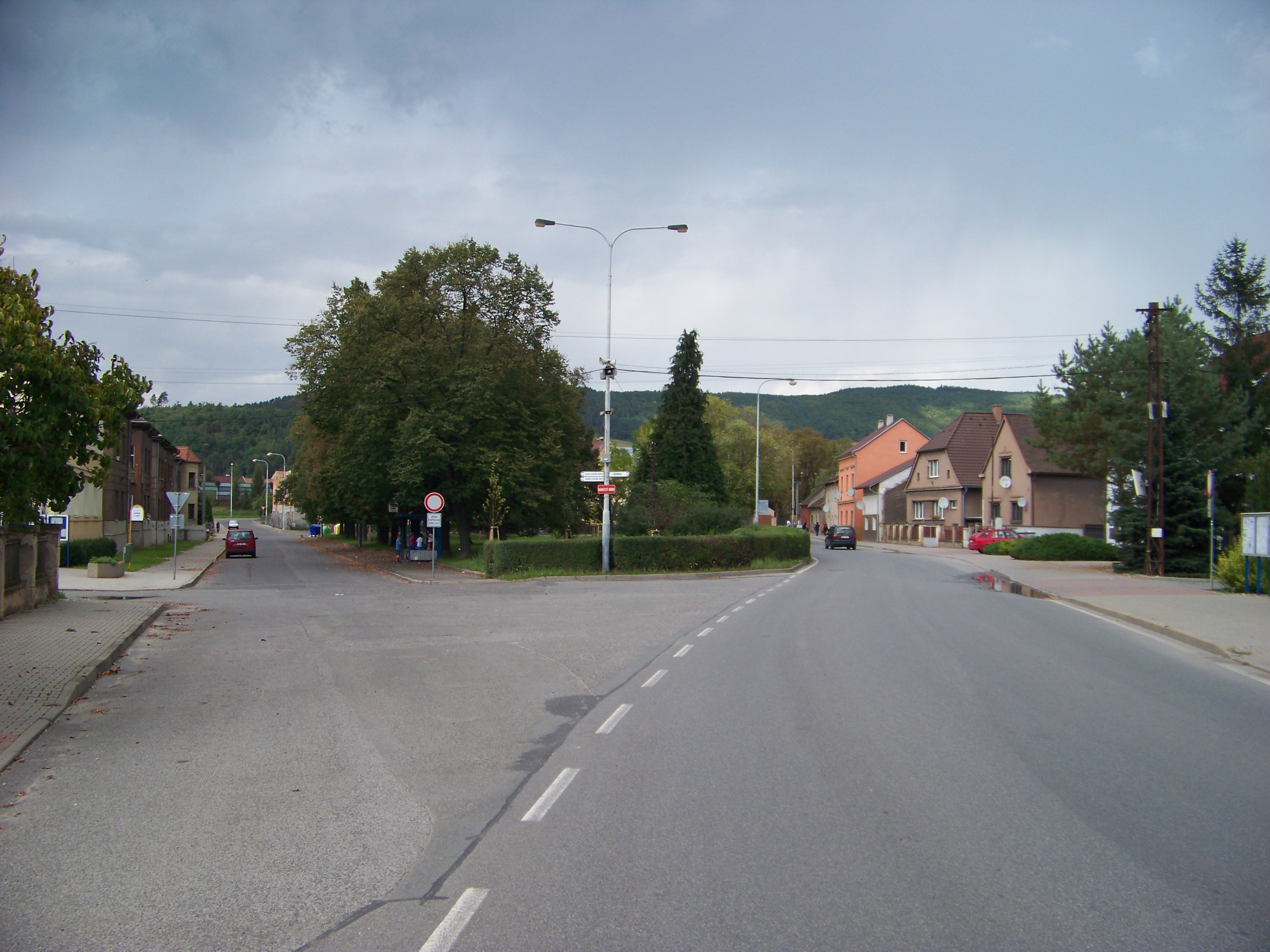
Náměstí Míru, centre of Králův Dvůr

Králův Dvůr consists of seven municipal parts (in brackets population according to the 2021 census):

- Králův Dvůr (4,354)
- Karlova Huť (356)
- Křižatky (620)
- Levín (1,429)
- Počaply (1,826)
- Popovice (645)
- Zahořany (774)

== Geography ==
Králův Dvůr is located about 28 km (17 mi) southwest of Prague and creates a conurbation with Beroun, located northeast of the town. It lies mostly in the Hořovice Uplands. Only the area of the Zahořany village extends into the Křivoklát Highlands and includes the highest point of Králův Dvůr, the slopes of the Děd hill at 473 m (1,552 ft) above sea level.

The Litavka River flows through the town. Its tributary, the stream Mlýnský potok, supplies a system of fishponds south of the town. The stream Suchomastský potok flows into the Litavka east of the town. Suchomasty Reservoir was built on this stream on an area of 9 ha (22 acres) in 1955–1959. It was originally water reservoir for the local iron processing industry, but today it is used for breeding fish and as a drinking water reserve.

== History ==
The first written mention of Králův Dvůr is from 1394, when King Wenceslaus IV of Bohemia was captured by Bohemian nobility here.

In the middle of the 13th century, King Wenceslaus I probably had a medieval court built here, which in 1585 was rebuilt into a Renaissance castle by the Lobkowicz family, who owned it for a time in the second half of the 16th century.

In 1850, municipalities of Králův Dvůr, Popovice, Karlova Huť a Křížatky were merged and created a single municipality. Králův Dvůr was joined to Beroun in 1980 as a housing and industrial suburb. In 1990, Králův Dvůr became an independent municipality again. In 2004, it became a town.

In 1988, the D5 motorway was built, splitting Králův Dvůr into two halves. Ironworks were decommissioned in the 1990s, significantly improving air pollution.

=== History of the municipal parts ===
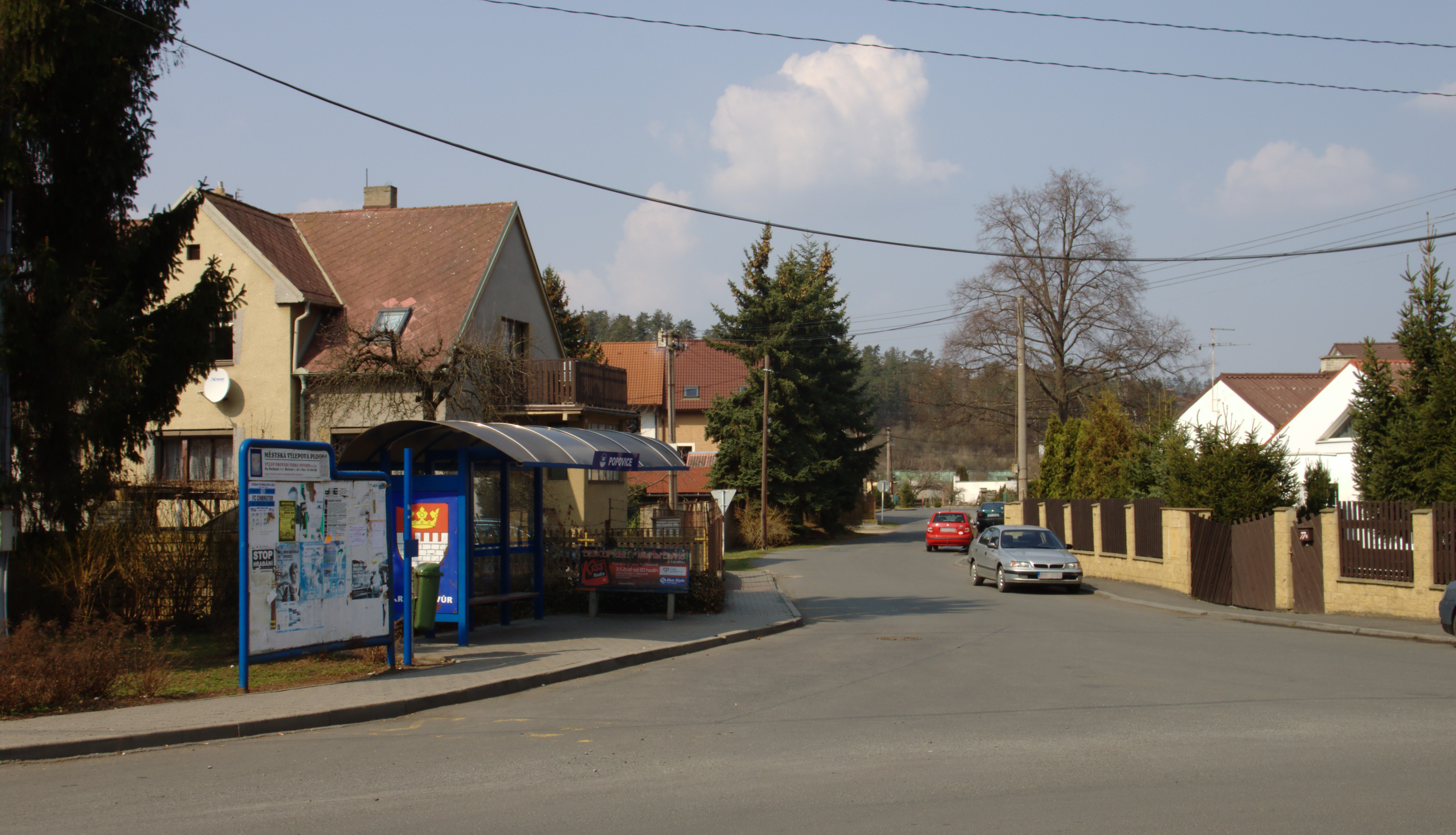
Popovice

The first written mention of Popovice is from 1266 when it was possessed by the Chotěšov Abbey. An iron smeltery was situated here, as well as iron mills powered by running water, which was fed by a system of ponds. Two ponds have been preserved – Měřák and Popovícký.

Karlova Huť was an iron smeltery established at the latest in the 1350s. In the 16th century, it was owned by the noble family of Karlové of Svárov, after which it got its name. In 1595, the very first blast furnace in Bohemia was built here. The settlement was mostly demolished in 1960 when the smeltery was expanded to iron works and cement plants were established. Although the classic blast furnace production ended here in the 1980s, the company's tradition continues to this day.

Počaply was first mentioned in 1253. The workers' colony for the nearby iron works was erected in 1905. In 1915, a monumental building of the primary school was built.

Křižatky was first mentioned in 1603. It was a small settlement situated in the hills, where blacksmiths from Karlova Huť lived. One hundred years later it no longer existed, but at the end of the 18th century it was restored again.

The first written mention of Levín is from 1391.

Zahořany was first mentioned in 1525, and in 1980 was joined to Beroun. Between 1990 and 2002, Zahořany was an independent municipality, and on 1 January 2003, Zahořany joined Králův Dvůr.

== Demographics ==
In the 21st century, population numbers are growing due to proximity to the capital city of Prague.

Historical population

Year	Pop.	±%
1869	1,649	—
1880	1,927	+16.9%
1890	2,220	+15.2%
1900	3,569	+60.8%
1910	5,430	+52.1%

Year	Pop.	±%
1921	5,505	+1.4%
1930	6,235	+13.3%
1950	6,396	+2.6%
1961	5,362	−16.2%
1970	4,833	−9.9%

Year	Pop.	±%
1980	6,013	+24.4%
1991	5,592	−7.0%
2001	5,562	−0.5%
2011	6,861	+23.4%
2021	10,004	+45.8%

Source: Censuses

== Transport ==
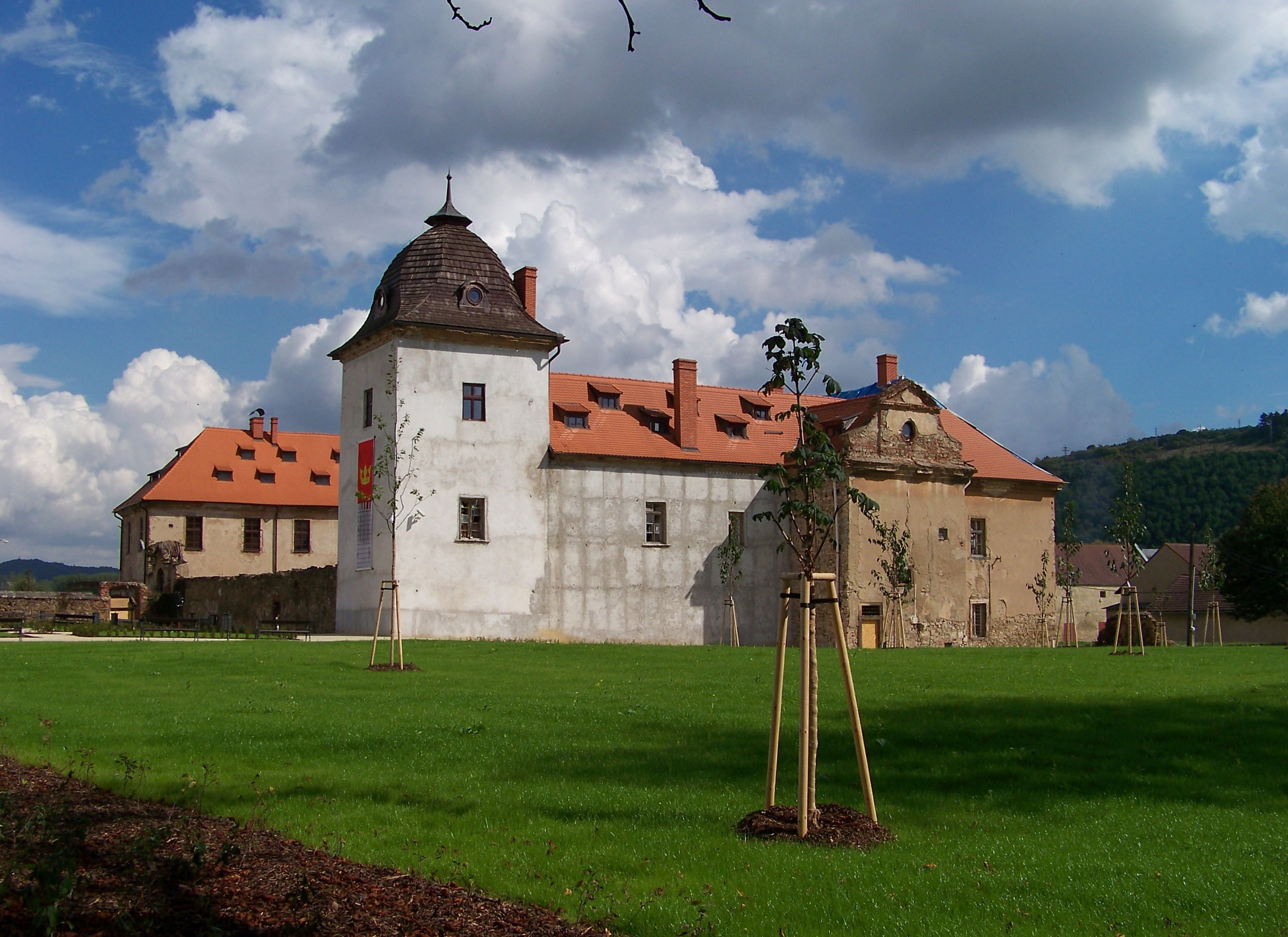
Králův Dvůr Castle

The D5 motorway (heading from Prague to Plzeň and further the Czech–German border in Rozvadov) runs through the town.

Králův Dvůr is located on the railway lines Beroun–Plzeň and Beroun–Strakonice. The town is served by two train stations: Králův Dvůr and Králův Dvůr-Popovice.

== Sights ==
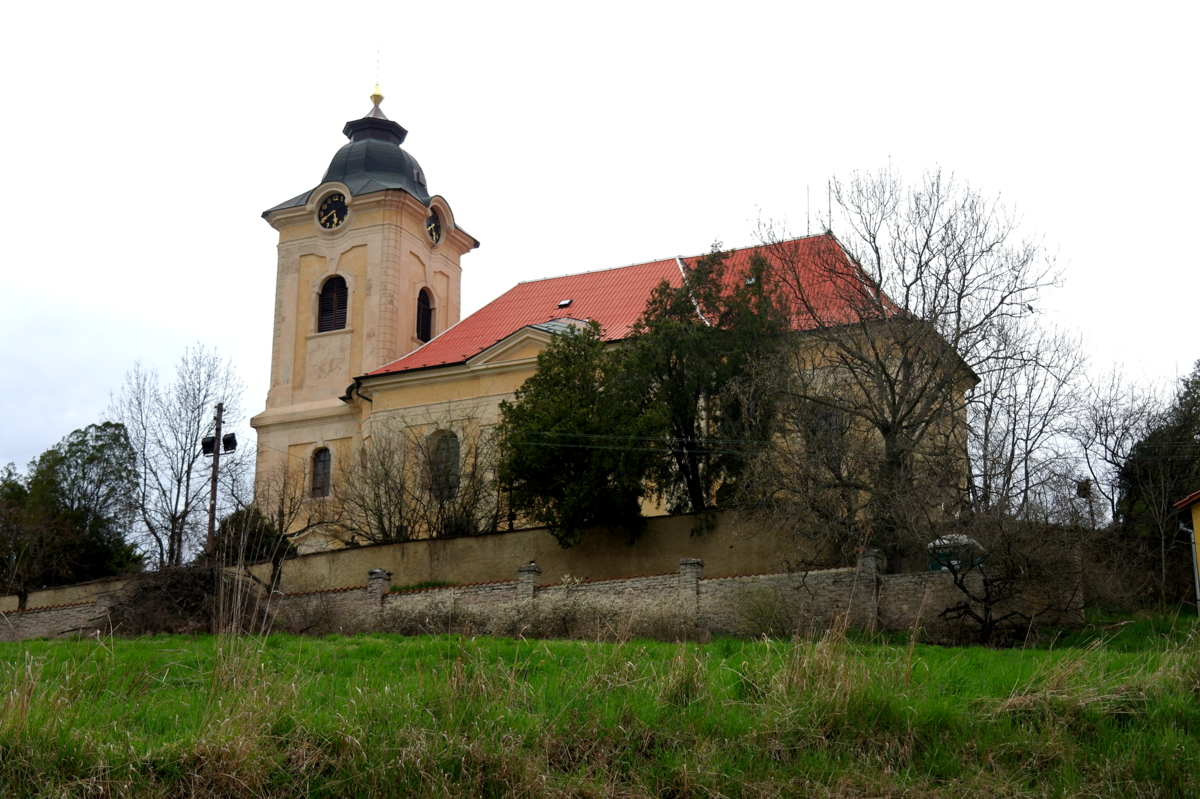
Church of the Assumption of the Virgin Mary in Počaply

The main landmark of the town is the Králův Dvůr Castle. In 1585, the stone court was rebuilt in the Renaissance style into a closed four-winged castle with an inner courtyard. During the great fire in 1712, the castle lost one wing. The biggest changes awaited the castle in the second half of the 18th century when it was rebuilt in the Baroque style. It received roughly its present appearance, which was most likely created by Kilian Ignaz Dientzenhofer.

In 1860, the castle was sold to Emil Egon Fürstenberg, who had no interest in keeping the property in good shape, and the castle was used as a warehouse. After World War II, the castle was nationalised, and state enterprises were maintained by using its buildings as a warehouse. The castle's garden was used as a path for the D5 highway. The castle was sold to a private owner in 2000 and its reconstruction is planned.

The Church of the Assumption of the Virgin Mary was built in Počaply in 1730–1733, most likely by K. I. Dientzenhofer.

== Notable people ==
- Jan Preisler (1872–1918), painter and art professor
- Alexander Hess (1898–1981), aviator and military leader
