= Fritz Wiedemann =

German Nazi official (1891–1970)

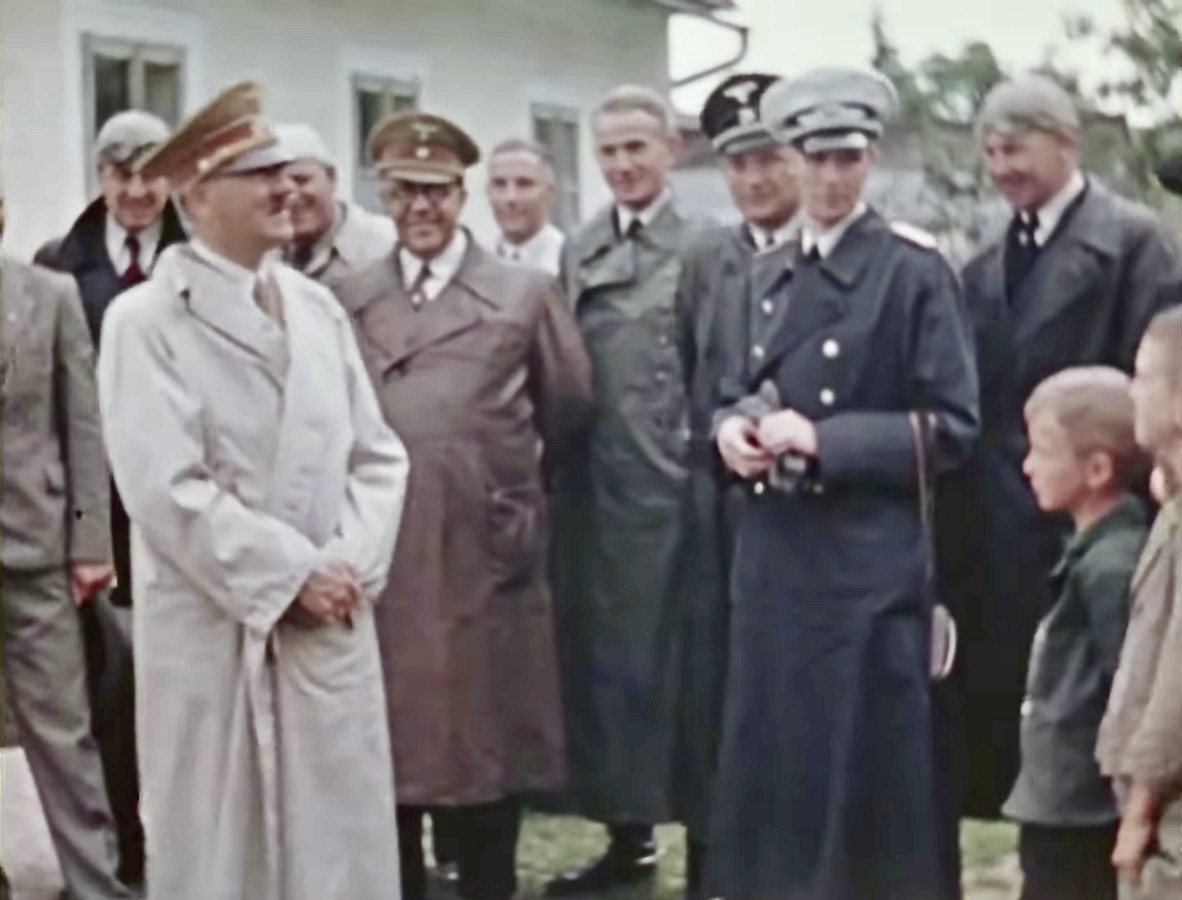
Captain Fritz Wiedemann (third from the right in a black colored SS hat) is pictured here along with Adolf Hitler (foreground, left) and other Nazi Party officials. c. 1935–1940.

Frederick Wiedemann (16 August 1891 in Augsburg – 17 January 1970 in Postmünster) was a German soldier, Nazi Party official, and (publicly) Consul General for the German Nazi party. He was, for a time, the personal adjutant to Adolf Hitler, having previously been Hitler's commanding officer in World War I. The two men subsequently had a falling-out. Later, some would claim that Wiedemann secretly repudiated his Nazi beliefs, warning American and British figures about Hitler's plans for Europe; however he continued to willingly serve Hitler as the Gestapo chief for the Western Hemisphere, from his post in San Francisco.

== Service in World War I ==
Wiedemann and Hitler first came into contact during the First World War when Hauptmann Wiedemann, as regimental adjutant, was Corporal Hitler's superior in the 16th Bavarian Infantry. Along with Max Amann he was one of Hitler's strongest supporters in the regiment, nominating him for the Iron Cross, First Class on a number of occasions before the medal was given in 1918. Wiedemann may have saved Hitler's life; after a building collapsed, Wiedemann pulled Hitler from the rubble despite facing heavy fire. Whilst giving evidence at the Nuremberg Trials, Wiedemann suggested that Hitler had failed to gain promotion in the regiment due to commanding officers viewing him as a 'Bohemian'.

== Hitler's adjutant ==
After the war Wiedemann left the army and became a farmer, initially refusing an offer from Hitler at the regimental reunion in 1922 to help organise the Sturmabteilung (SA). However, when Hitler came to power in 1933 Wiedemann accepted a new offer, initially in the offices of Rudolf Hess before taking up his post at Hitler's side, as well as Nazi Party membership, on 2 February 1934. From then on Wiedemann remained at Hitler's side, accompanying him on state visits, facilitating meetings and dealing with Hitler's correspondence. He also attended a meeting with Lord Halifax in July 1938 in which Wiedemann gave reassurances that "no forcible action" was anticipated by Hitler over the Sudetenland unless there were some serious incident to provoke it. At the 1938 parliamentary election, he was elected as a deputy to the Reichstag from electoral constituency 3 (Berlin East).

== Diplomatic service ==
Not long after this, Wiedemann fell out of favor with Hitler as his rival Julius Schaub became the more important adjutant. After trysting with Stephanie von Hohenlohe, he was "exiled", in January 1939, to San Francisco as a Consul General to the United States. Wiedemann continued to publicly support Nazism and apparently led a playboy lifestyle which included attendance at society parties, membership of the exclusive Olympic Club and regular appearances in the columns of Herb Caen. A 2013 article in the Mercury News stated "In a startling revelation, Dec. 31, 1940, a Look Magazine article pegged Wiedemann as 'probably the most dangerous Nazi in the country.' In fact, he was the Gestapo chief of all German cloak and dagger operations in the Western Hemisphere."

Allegations leveled in a case filed at the city's Federal District Court in 1941 also suggested that he worked on pro-Nazi initiatives with Henry Ford. He was deported from the United States on July 15, 1941, to much press coverage.

== Claims about Wiedemann's beliefs after the war ==
Years later, some have claimed that in private, Wiedemann broke entirely with Nazism. He met with the British agent Sir William Wiseman, warning him of Hitler's unstable personality and urging Britain to attack Germany. He also offered to publicly denounce the German regime, but the White House at that time had no interest in such an offer. Wiedemann was, at a minimum, a man of contrasts; it has been reported that Wiedemann was given a choice as to whether or not he wanted the post in San Francisco. Wiedemann served "as chief of the Nazi propaganda and espionage services in the United States."

Thomas Weber has found the records of Wiedemann's 1940 talks with Wiseman in which Wiedemann openly warned against Hitler and claimed Hitler had a "split personality and numbered among the most cruel people in the world, saw himself better than Napoleon and that peace with him was impossible." He told Wiseman of Hitler's plans to attack and conquer the UK and "recommended strongly" that the British themselves strike as quickly and as "hard as possible" against him. Wiedemann also told Wiseman that the morale of the German population and the support of Hitler were lower than generally believed. Thomas Weber said if Hitler had known about Wiedemann's "treason," he would have given him the death penalty.

After his removal from the United States in 1941, Wiedemann appeared in Argentina and other South American countries, before he was sent to Tientsin where he was a central figure in German espionage in China, apparently this time without betraying Hitler.

In his interrogation after his arrest, Wiedemann stated that after his post in San Francisco, Joachim von Ribbentrop (at the time the Minister of Foreign Affairs of Nazi Germany) instructed Wiedemann to "be very cautious with uttering my opinions because I was well known to be a defeatist." He continued about his time in Germany after leaving San Francisco, "I didn't see Hitler because I didn't ask for an audience and I went back to my -- to Berlin first and sent to a little farm I have in Bavaria. I have to tell you Ribbentrop asked me if I was ready and willing to go to East Asia because it was my wish -- I said 'Yes, of course, as soon as possible.'"

In 2012 it was claimed that Wiedemann had helped to save Hitler's Jewish commanding officer, Ernst Hess. Hess's daughter Ursula, by then 86 and still living in Germany, stated in an interview with the Jewish Voice that her father had, by chance, met Wiedemann, with whom he served in the First World War and that when he later became Hitler's adjutant, he secured concessions for Hess that were not otherwise open to Jews.

On one occasion he actively intervened to help the Jewish-born widow of Willi Schmid, a victim of the Night of the Long Knives, escape Germany.

== Post–World War II ==
After the Second World War, Wiedemann was arrested in Tientsin, China, in September 1945, was brought to Manila and flown to the United States. He gave evidence at Nuremberg and charges made against him were dropped in 1948 and he subsequently returned to farming, disappearing from public life.

Some 7,000 personal and semiofficial papers of Fritz Wiedemann have been acquired by the Library of Congress.
