= Wir 3 =

- Origin: Germany
- Genres: Pop, Bubblegum pop
- Instrument: Vocals
- Years active: 2007–2010
- Label: Studio 100 (2007–2010)
- Website: Official website (German)

Wir 3 (en. We three) was the German version of the popular Belgian-Dutch girl group K3.

== History ==
Stemming from the success of K3 in the Netherlands and Belgium, in 2007 Studio 100 decided to make a similar band to it abroad. In the end, Germany was picked as the place of origin for this new band due to its size and the similarities between the German and Dutch languages.

Ten years later, the name of the band (after translation) and the experience of the creators were used to create a similar band pl:My3 in neighboring Poland.

== Members ==
Similarly to K3 and My3, Wir 3 had 3 female members:

- Lina Sasnauskaitė
- Linda Hesse
- Vera Hübner

== Media ==
- Since 2008: Die Welt von Wir 3 (aired on Super RTL, produced by Studio 100)

== Discography ==
=== Singles ===
Year	Title	Charts			Album
Year	Title	GER	AUT	SWI	Album
2007	Heyah Mama	46	38	62	Wir 3
2007	Kuma He	58	48	−	Wir 3
2008	Omi ist der Hit	42	7	−	Wir 3
2008	Liebeskapitän	81	44	−	Wir 3
2009	Regenbogenbunt	−	63	−	Regenbogenbunt

=== Albums ===
Year	Title	Charts		
Year	Title	GER	AUT	SWI
2008	Wir 3	45	2	52
2009	Regenbogenbunt	82	18	−

== Sources ==
- "WIR 3, de Duitse K3! - Studio100.info". studio100.info. (Dutch)
- (Dutch)
- (German)
- (German)
- (German)
- (Dutch)
- (Dutch)
