= No. 310 (Czechoslovak) Squadron RAF =

Defunct flying squadron of the Royal Air Force

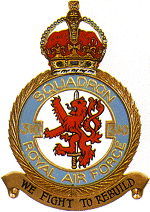
- Badge of № 310 Squadron RAF
- Active: 29 July 1940 – 15 February 1946
- Country: United Kingdom
- Allegiance: United Kingdom (Czech Republic) Czechoslovakia (August 1945 onwards)
- Branch: Royal Air Force
- Role: Day Fighting
- Part of: RAF Fighter Command
- Nickname(s): Czechoslovak
- Motto(s): We Fight to Rebuild
- Engagements: Battle of Britain; Normandy landings

Insignia
- Squadron Badge: In front of a sword erect, a lion rampant queue fourches
- Squadron Codes: NN (July 1940 – February 1946)

No. 310 Squadron RAF was a Czechoslovak-manned fighter squadron of the Royal Air Force in the Second World War.

== History ==
The squadron was formed on 10 July 1940 at RAF Duxford. It was the first RAF squadron to be raised crewed by foreign nationals, in this case escaped Czechoslovak pilots. Initially it had two Squadron Leaders: the British Douglas Blackwood and the Czechoslovak Alexander Hess. Hess and many of his men had served in the Czechoslovak Air Force, escaped from Czechoslovakia after it was occupied by Nazi Germany, and then joined the French Air Force and fought in the Battle of France.

Initially the squadron was equipped with Hawker Hurricane I fighters. The squadron was operational in only a month and as part of 12 Group took part in the Battle of Britain as part of the Duxford Big Wing. The squadron claimed 37½ victories in the battle.

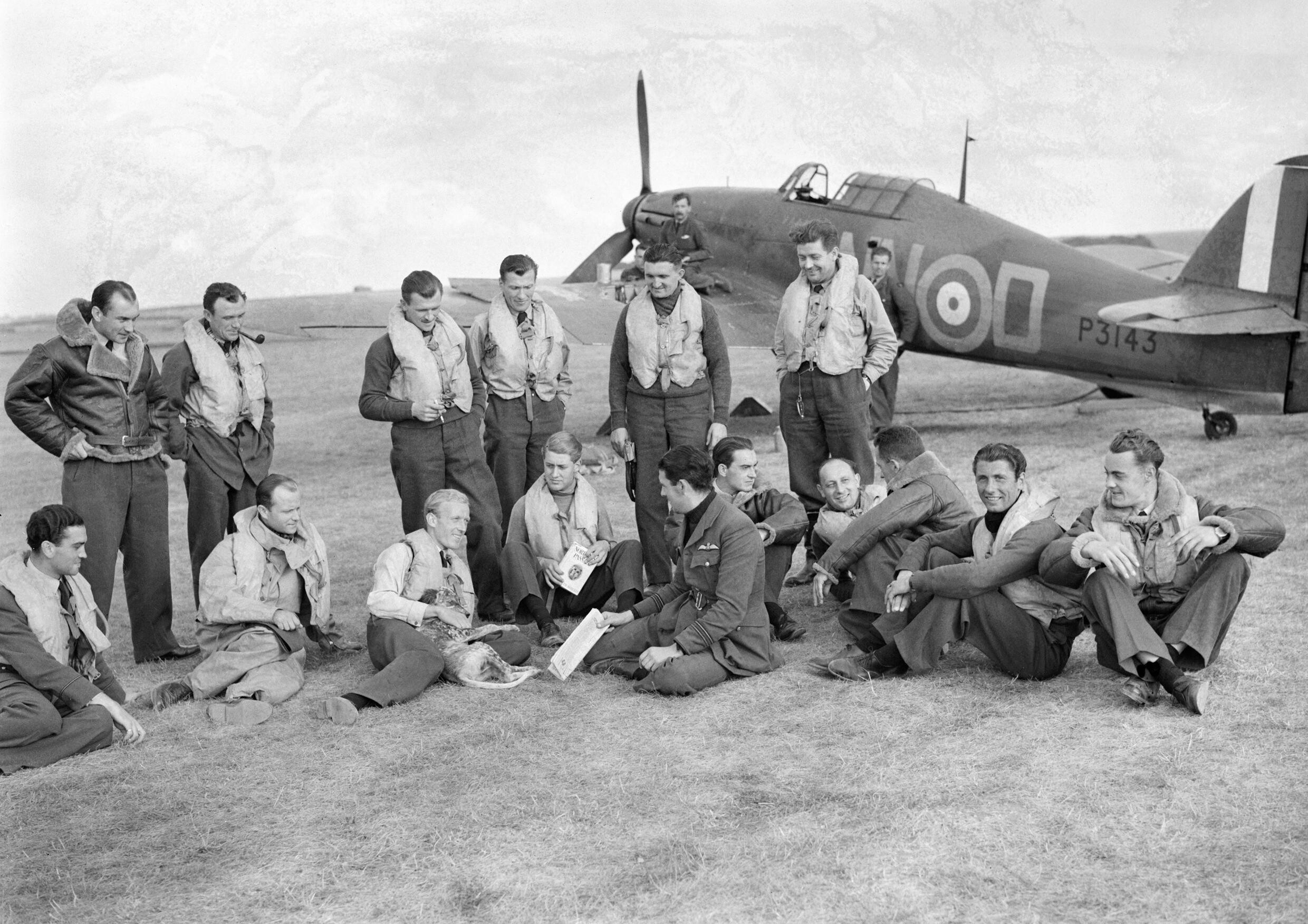
310 Squadron pilots in front of a Hawker Hurricane at RAF Duxford in September 1940

From 1941 the squadron began offensive operations flying sweeps over the English Channel and providing bomber escorts. In 1941 Hess was transferred to be a Czechoslovak liaison officer at Fighter Command, and on 28 February Sqn Ldr František Weber succeeded him in command of 311 Squadron.

In March 1941 the squadron was re-equipped with the Hurricane II. On 26 June it moved to RAF Martlesham Heath in Suffolk. On 19 July 1941 the squadron moved again, to RAF Dyce in Scotland, to rest. It was re-equipped with the Supermarine Spitfire IIa and Vb in October 1941.

On 14 December 1941 the squadron moved to RAF Perranporth in Cornwall for defensive operations. On 7 April 1942 Sqn Ldr František Doležal succeeded Weber as squadron commander. On 7 May the squadron moved to RAF Exeter.

On 15 January 1943 Doležal was succeeded by Sqn Ldr Emil Foit. On 26 June 1943 the squadron moved to RAF Castletown in Caithness, Scotland for another three-month rest period. From July to September it operated the Spitfire VI. On 18 September 1943 the squadron moved to RAF Ibsley in Hampshire.

On 13 January 1944 Sqn Ldr Hugo Hrbáček succeeded Foit as squadron commander. On 20 February the squadron moved to RAF Mendlesham in Suffolk, on 29 March it moved again to RAF Rochford in Essex, and on 3 April it moved again to RAF Appledram in West Sussex. On 21 May Sqn Ldr Václav Raba succeeded Hrbáček as squadron commander.

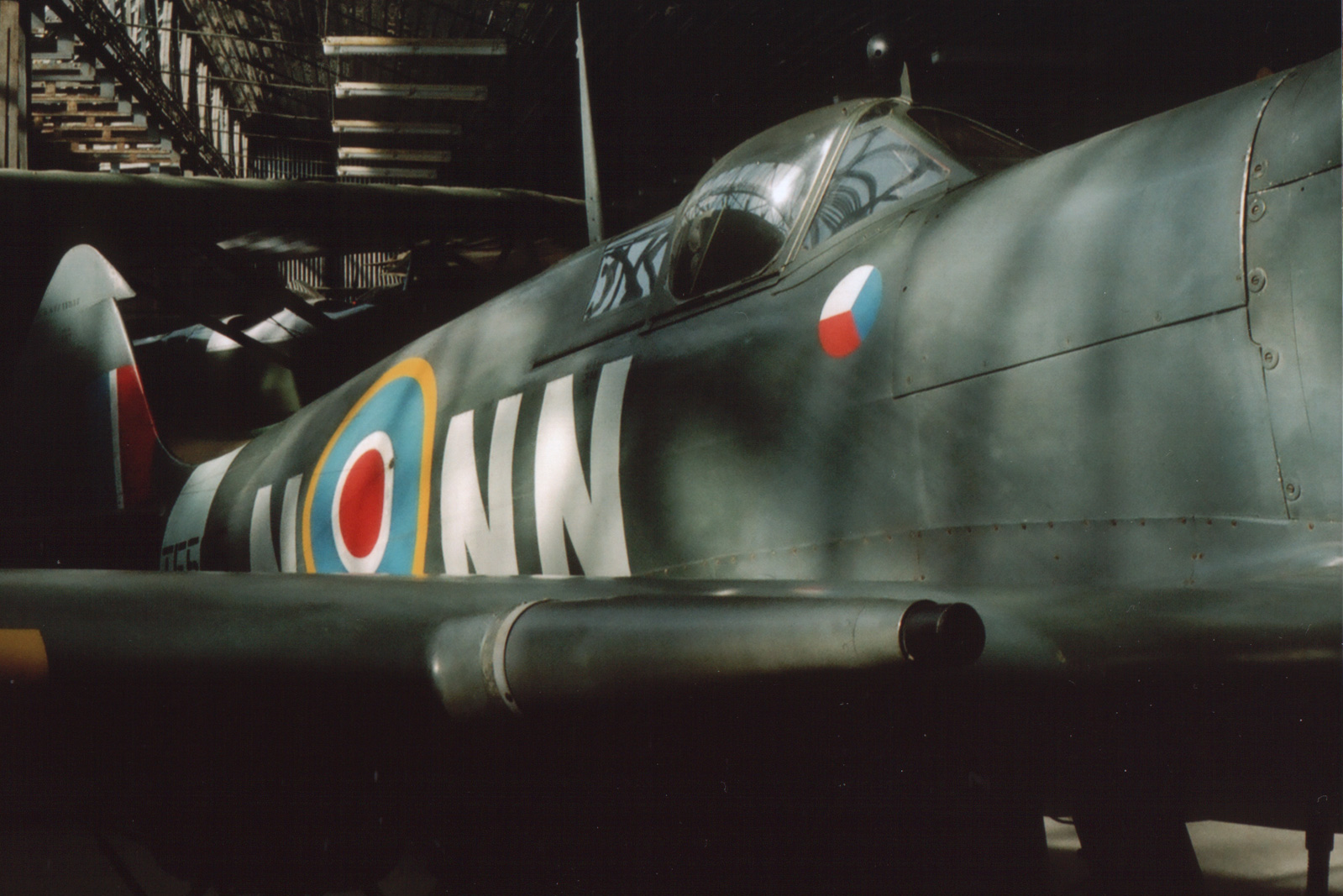
Spitfire Mk IX in 310 Squadron markings at Prague Aviation Museum, Kbely

In 1944 the squadron was re-equipped with the Spitfire IX and became a fighter-bomber unit with 134 Wing, flying ground attack duties during the Normandy landings. From 22 June until 4 July the squadron was based at RAF Tangmere in West Sussex, and from 4 to 11 July it was based at RAF Lympne in Kent.

On 11 July 1944 the squadron moved to RAF Digby in Lincolnshire, and on 28 August it moved again to RAF North Weald in Essex. On 15 September Sqn Ldr Jiří Hartman succeeded Raba as squadron commander. The squadron then spent the rest of the war flying armed reconnaissance missions along the Dutch and Belgian coasts. On 29 December 1944 it moved to RAF Bradwell Bay in Essex, and on 27 February 1945 the squadron moved to RAF Manston in Kent.

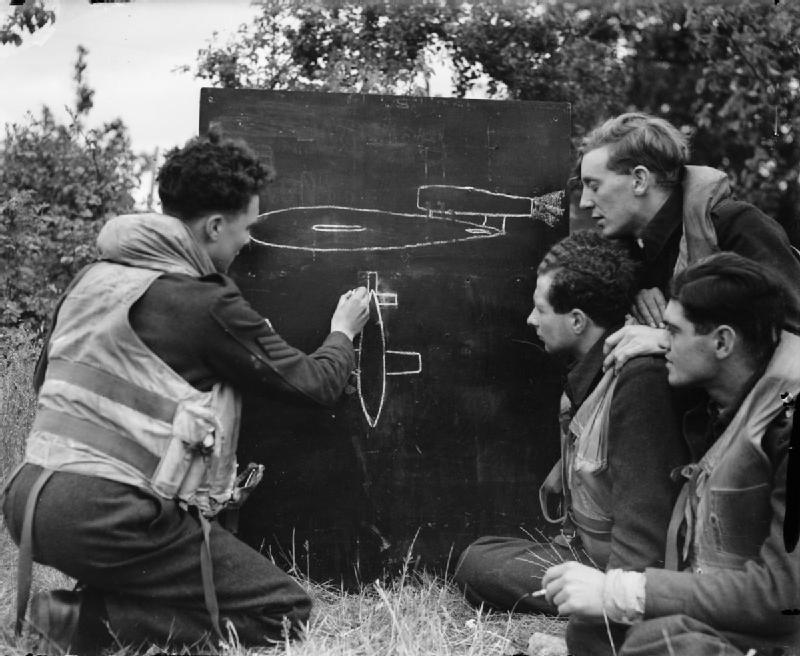
An RAF Flight Sergeant instructs fellow-pilots on features of the V-1 flying bomb

The squadron's final score was 52½ claims including four V-1 flying bombs shot down. Three of those flying bombs were shot down on 8 July by the same fighter ace, Flt Lt Otto Smik DFC, in one sortie, within 32 minutes of each other.

On 7 August 1945 the squadron moved to Hildesheim, and on 31 August it moved again to Ruzyně Airport in Prague. It became a squadron of the new Czechoslovak Air Force, and on 15 February 1946 was officially disbanded as an RAF squadron.

== Aircraft operated ==
Aircraft used
From	To	Aircraft	Variant	Notes
July 1940	March 1941	Hawker Hurricane	I	
March 1941	December 1941	Hawker Hurricane	IIa	
June 1941	November 1941	Hawker Hurricane	IIb	
October 1941	December 1941	Supermarine Spitfire	IIa	
November 1941	March 1944	Supermarine Spitfire	Vb	
July 1942	June 1943	Supermarine Spitfire	Vc	
July 1943	September 1943	Supermarine Spitfire	VI	
September 1943	March 1944	Supermarine Spitfire	Vc	
January 1944	July 1944	Supermarine Spitfire	LF.IX	
July 1944	September 1944	Supermarine Spitfire	Vb	
August 1944	February 1946	Supermarine Spitfire	LF.IX	

== Surviving Aircraft ==
Supermarine Spitfire Vc 'AR501' (civil registration G-AWII) built in 1942, remains airworthy, and is maintained & operated by The Shuttleworth Collection in Bedfordshire, England. AR501 was one of a production batch of 300 Spitfires ordered under Contract No. 1305/40 of August 1940 from Westland Aircraft, Yeovil.

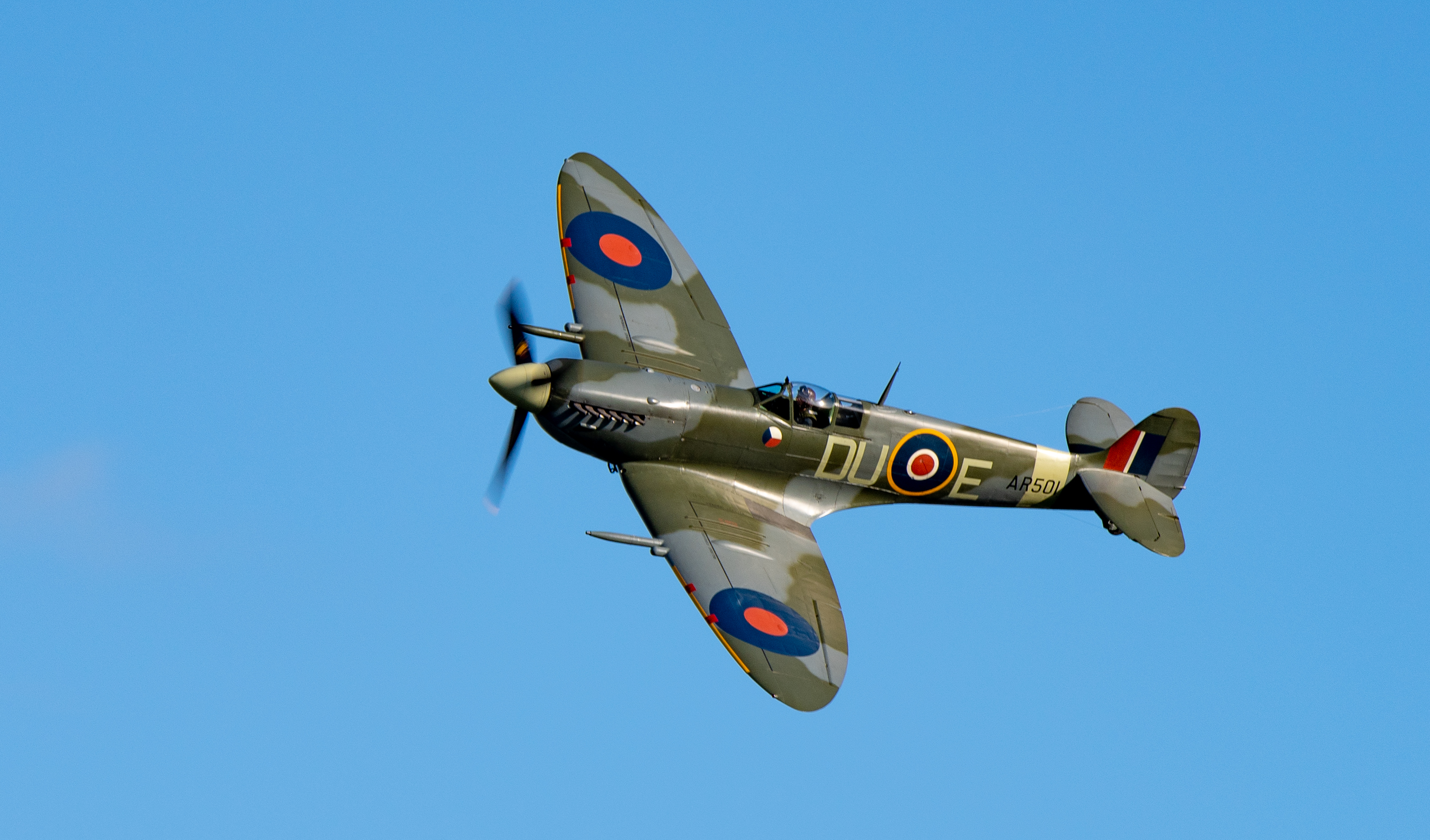
Spitfire Mk Vc 'AR501' of The Shuttleworth Collection, shown here in No. 312 (Czech) colours

Following restoration in 2018 by The Shuttleworth Collection it is presented in the squadron colours of No. 312 (Czech) Squadron, which the aircraft moved to on October 10th 1943 from No. 310 (Czech) Squadron. Shuttleworth periodically switch between elliptical and clipped wing configurations.
