= Charles R. Hess =

American politician and lawyer (1858–1928)

Member of the Ohio House of Representatives from the Shelby County district
- In office 1896–1899
- Preceded by: Harris N. Harshbarger
- Succeeded by: William E. Partington

Personal details
- Born: September 12, 1858 Columbus, Ohio, U.S.
- Died: October 27, 1928 (aged 70) Sidney, Ohio, U.S.
- Resting place: Graceland Cemetery
- Spouse: Blanche Armstrong (m. 1903)
- Children: 4
- Occupation: Politician; lawyer; printer

Charles R. Hess (September 12, 1858 – October 27, 1928) was an American politician and lawyer from Ohio. He served as a member of the Ohio House of Representatives, representing Shelby County, from 1896 to 1899.

== Early life ==
Charles R. Hess was born on September 12, 1858, in Columbus, Ohio, to Sophia (née Berger) and Andrew Hess. He apprenticed in the printing trade. While engaged in that trade, as a young man, Hess lost his right arm. He studied law under Judge Conklin and was admitted to the bar in Ohio in 1891.

== Career ==
Hess practiced law in Sidney, focusing on real estate law and title examination.

Hess served as a member of the Ohio House of Representatives, representing Shelby County, from 1896 to 1899. He also served as justice of the peace of Clinton Township.

== Personal life ==
Hess married Blanche Armstrong of Columbus on December 23, 1903. They had at least four children, Mrs. Orville Miller, Edith, Rhoda and Robert.

Hess died on October 27, 1928, at his home on East Avenue in Sidney. He was buried at Graceland Cemetery.
