= Per Hess =

Norwegian visual artist

Per Hess (born 20 January 1946) is a Norwegian visual artist.

Hess was born in Kongsberg. He was educated at the School of Arts and Crafts (1970–1973) and the Academy of Fine Art (1973–1979) in Oslo. Both institutions are now part of the Oslo National Academy of the Arts (KHiO).

After completing his education, Hess worked with expressionist/abstract painting, with an increasing attention to colour. The themes invoked in his later work have included explorations of definitions of value, capital and money, drawing on philosophy and political theory, while retaining an emphasis on painting as a self-referential medium. Hess has received widespread critical acclaim for his work. For example, with reference to his exhibition Down to Business at Galleri LNM in 2004, art critic for the Norwegian newspaper Verdens Gang, Lars Elton, wrote that "the cathedral triumphs over the stock exchange because he [Hess] shows that the minimalist and extreme-modernist project has a vitality that far exceeds the capitalists' power of imagination".

Hess has held a number of solo exhibitions, among them Øyeporten at Galleri Gimle in Oslo (1991); Fargebilder at Galleri LNM in Oslo (1993); Specially Coloured at Kongsberg Kunstforening (1999); White Border at Kunstnersenteret i Buskerud in Drammen (2001); Down to Business at Galleri LNM (2004); White Wash at Hå gamle prestegard, Jæren, (2005); Monet – Money at Galleri 1 in Sandvika (2010). Recent, important exhibitions include White Is the New Black at Galleri GAD, Oslo (2012) and Personal Structures at Palazzo Bembo, 55 Biennale di Venezia (2013).

Hess has had a number of public commissions, including a floor-based installation across four stories at the Department of Informatics at the University of Oslo (1988); Seeds, which is a comprehensive commission stretching across the floors, walls and ceiling of Oslo University Hospital, Rikshospitalet (The National Hospital) (1996-2000); Via, which is a series of 16 wall-paintings at the Oslo University Hospital, Rikshospitalet (1998–2000); and the Bridges series for the Drammen Police building (2001).

Hess has also worked as an artistic consultant on a number of public art projects, including those taking place at the University of Oslo Faculty of Law; the Faculty of Sciences at the University of Oslo; the BI Norwegian School of Management; the University of Bergen; Helga Engs Hus at the University of Oslo; the University of Oslo Library; the hospital Sykehuset Asker og Bærum in Sandvika: Aker Solutions' headquarters at Snarøya; the Norwegian Theatre in Oslo; Kilden Performing Arts Centre in Kristiansand.

Hess has sat on the board of the national organization for visual artists in Norway, Norske Billedkunstnere (NBK) (The Norwegian Visual Artists) as well as this organisation's predecessors Bildende Kunstneres Styre (BKS), and Norske Billedkunstneres Fagorganisasjon (NBFO); the organisation for visual artists in Oslo and Akershus (BOA); and Trafo Artists' House in Oslo. Hess has also been the editor of Norwegian art journal Billedkunst.

Hess is a member of the national organization for visual artists in Norway Norske Billedkunstnere (NBK) and the Norwegian Association of Painters (LNM) He lives and works in Oslo.
