= Ursula Hess (psychologist) =

German psychologist (born 1960)

Ursula Hess (13 August 1960 in Frankfurt/Main, Germany) is a German psychologist who teaches at the Humboldt-University of Berlin as Professor of Social and Organizational Psychology at the Department of Psychology.

== Education ==
Hess received a Diploma in psychology (MA equivalent) from the Justus-Liebig University in 1986 and a Ph.D. in social psychology from Dartmouth College in 1989.

== Career ==
From 1989 to 1992, Hess was a post-doctoral researcher (Maître Assistant) at the University of Geneva. In 1992, Hess began a professorship at the University of Quebec at Montreal, where she was promoted to Full Professor in 2000. She is currently Professor of Social and Organizational Psychology at the Department of Psychology at the Humboldt-University of Berlin

She was elected President of the Society for Psychophysiological Research in 2017.

Her research focuses the communication of emotions. In particular, the social factors that influence this process such as gender and intergroup relations. One line of research investigates the role of facial mimicry, i.e. the imitation of the emotion expressions of others, for successful emotion communication. Another line of research on social context influences focuses on the social signal function of emotions. Specifically, on the information about the person or the context that people can infer from the emotional reactions of others as well as the impact of explicit context information on this process. Both lines of research include research on cross-cultural emotion communication.

Some of this work was done in collaboration with Shlomo Hareli.
