= Jessica Hess =

American contemporary artist

- Born: 1981 (age 44–45); Massachusetts, U.S.
- Education: Rhode Island School of Design
- Occupation: Artist
- Years active: 2002–present
- Website: http://www.jessicahess.com/

Jessica Hess (born 1981) is an American contemporary artist, based in Oakland, California. She is internationally known for her realist paintings, which often feature either a landscape, buildings in a state of decay, street art, and/or graffiti. Her paintings are of urban environment and fame and confirm the art of graffiti through fine lenses of oil paintings on canvas and gouache on paper.

Hess was born in Massachusetts and she grew up in North Carolina. Hess attended Rhode Island School of Design (RISD) in Providence, Rhode Island and graduated with a BFA degree in Illustration in 2003. Her work was featured in the juried international art magazine, New American Paintings, issue number 74 (February/March 2008). Hess' artwork was used as an illustration for Harper's Magazine (April 2009).

== Exhibitions ==
This is a list of select exhibitions by Hess, in order by year.

- 2019 – District 13 Art Fair, Paris, France
- 2019 – The Chaos Aesthetic, solo exhibition, Hashimoto Contemporary, San Francisco, California
- 2012 – Boston Ten and Beyond, the Danforth Museum, Framingham, Massachusetts

== Publications ==
- Juxtapoz Hyperreal, Gingko Press, 2014
