= Alexander Hess =

Czech aviator (1898–1981)

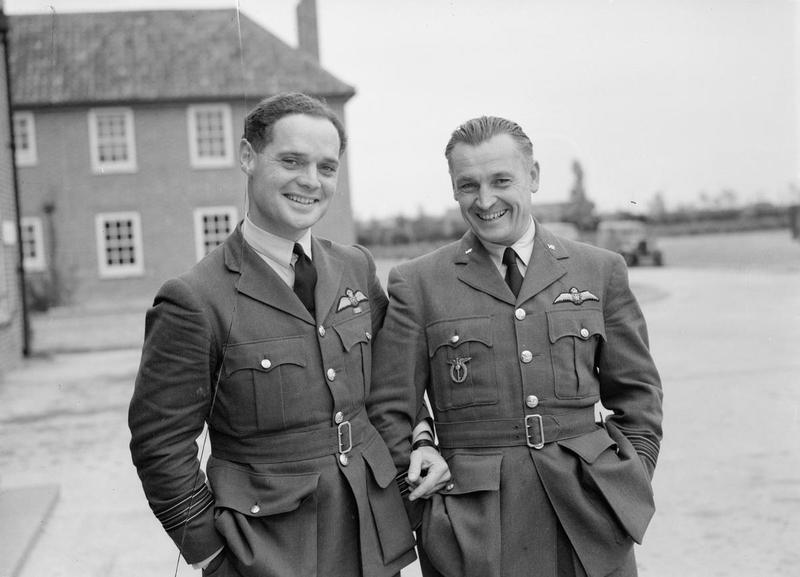
- Hess (right) with Douglas Bader (left), 1940
- Born: 4 May 1898; Karlova Huť, Austria-Hungary
- Died: 10 August 1981 (aged 83); Brooksville, Florida, United States
- Battles / wars: World War II
- Awards: Distinguished Flying Cross; Order of the White Lion

Alexander Hess (4 May 1898 – 10 August 1981) was a Czech aviator who commanded the No. 310 Czechoslovak Squadron of the Royal Air Force during the Battle of Britain.

== Early life ==
Alexander Hess was born on 4 May 1898, in Austria-Hungary. He joined the Austro-Hungarian Army in 1916, fighting on both the Russian and Italian fronts, getting wounded twice. After World War I ended, he went to study at the Czech Technical University in Prague. In the 1920s, he joined the air force, becoming an aviator.He gained notability for his flying skills, and won an award at the 1937 International Flying Competition in Zurich.

== Career in World War II ==
After Czechoslovakia was occupied by Nazi Germany in 1939, he fled to Poland. Following the outbreak of World War II in September 1939 with the invasion of Poland, Hess decided to flee to France, doing so in January 1940, travelling through Slovakia, Hungary, Yugoslavia, and Italy. France fell later that year, and Hess arrived in Britain in June 1940, joining the No. 310 Czechoslovak Squadron. On 15 September, his Hurricane was shot down over the Thames Estuary, with him bailing out unharmed. Hess served as an air attache to the United States in 1942, and to Canada in 1943. After the war ended, he was awarded with the Distinguished Flying Cross.

== Post-war life ==
In 1948, the new communist government deemed Hess as unreliable due to his opposition of communism and discharged him from the air force. He then moved with his wife and son to Bavaria, before moving to Brooksville, Florida. Hess was involved with the Council of Free Czechoslovakia until he retired in 1965. He died at his home in Brooksville on 10 August, 1981, at the age of 83.

In October 2021, he was posthumously awarded the Order of the White Lion by President Miloš Zeman.
