= Linda Hesse =

German singer

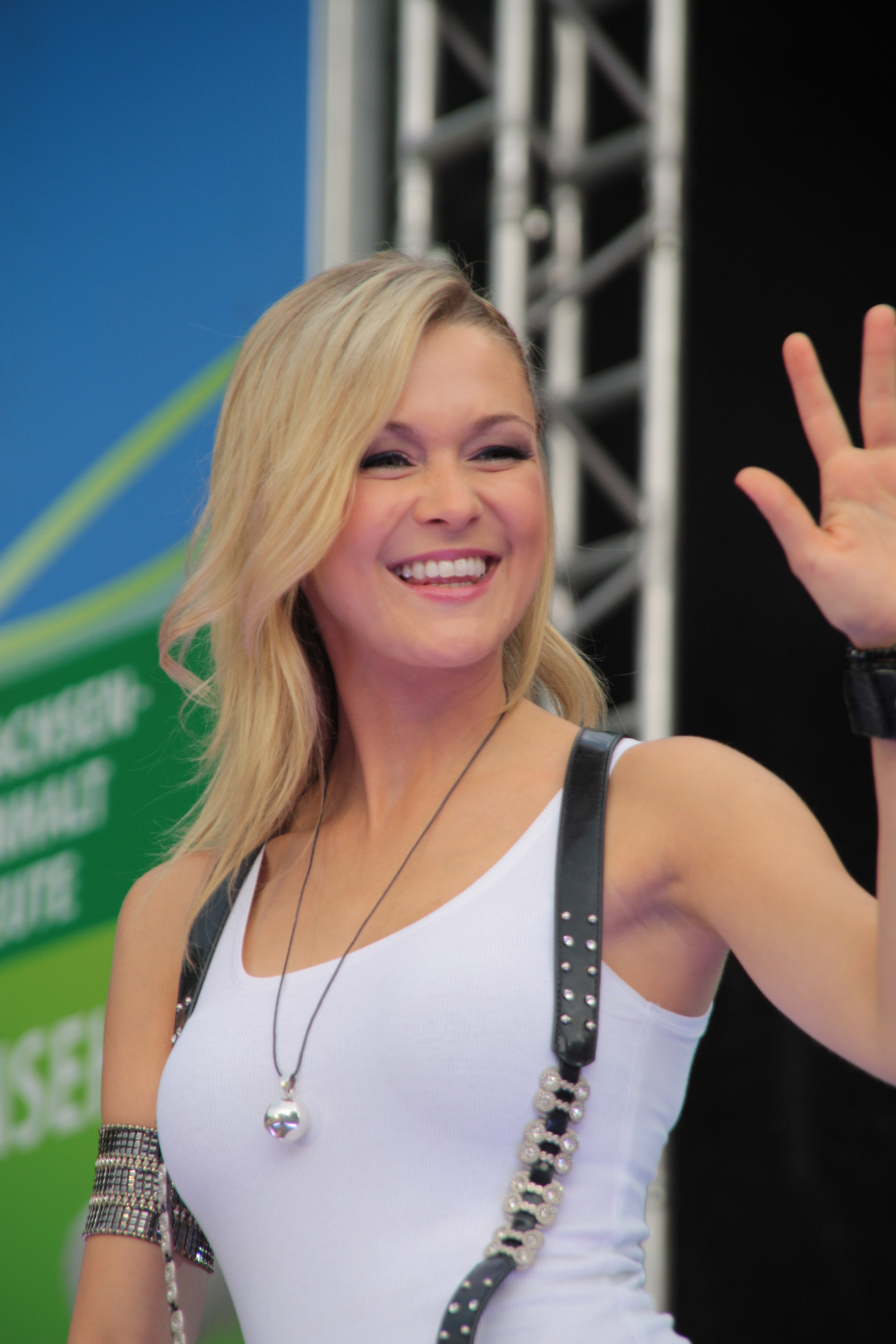
- Website: http://www.lindahesse.de

Linda Hesse (born 22 May 1987) is a German singer.

== Life ==
Linda Hesse grew up in Halberstadt. She attended a high school and took singing lessons. In 2004 she was a participant in the Sat.1 casting show Star Search. After graduation in 2007, she became a member of the pop music group Wir3.

In 2011, Hesse began her solo career. On 26 October 2012 she released her debut single I'm not a man. On 15 February 2013 her debut album Punktgenau Landung was released.

Hesse was photographed as a cover girl for the June 2018 issue of the German Playboy.

== Philanthropy ==
She has supported children and adolescents suffering from cancer. In 2014, Hesse became ambassador of the German Cancer Aid campaign. On the occasion of the 40th anniversary of the organization, she dedicated her song With all her might. In 2016 she gave an exclusive concert for children with cancer at the Charité Berlin with bandmate and life partner André Franke. In 2017, she continued her music career with an exclusive concert at the Department of Paediatrics and Adolescent Medicine at the Carl Gustav Carus Dresden University Hospital.

== Discography ==
=== Album ===
- 2013: Punktgenaue Landung
- 2014: Hör auf dein Herz
- 2016: Sonnenkind
- 2018: Mach ma laut

=== Singles ===
- 2012: Ich bin ja kein Mann
- 2012: Santa Claus kommt einmal im Jahr (Santa Claus Is Coming to Town)
- 2013: Komm bitte nicht
- 2013:D+B+E+A
- 2013: Punktgenaue Landung
- 2014: Knutschen… ich kann nichts dafür
- 2014: Verbotene Liebe
- 2015: Hör auf Dein Herz
- 2015: Mit aller Kraft (Mein Song für die Deutsche Krebshilfe)
- 2016: Noch immer so wie immer
- 2016: Nein
- 2017: Bunt
- 2018: Mach ma laut
