= Hoss (nickname) =

Hoss is a nickname of:

- Bill "Hoss" Allen (1922–1997), American radio disc jockey
- Hoss Ellington (1935–2014), American NASCAR driver and team owner
- Hoss Hodgson (1886–1967), American football player and coach
- Jeff Hostetler (born 1961), former National Football League quarterback
- Waylon Jennings (1937–2002), American country music singer
- Hoss Wright, American rock drummer
- Eric "Hoss" Cartwright, one of the main characters on the TV series Bonanza

== See also ==
- Old Hoss Radbourn (1854–1897), American professional baseball pitcher
- Corey Harrison, aka "Big Hoss", from the History Channel's Pawn Stars
