= Hoss (surname) =

Hoss is a surname. Notable people with the surname include:

- Américo Hoss (1916–1990), Hungarian-Argentine cinematographer
- Bernd Hoss (1939–2016), German football manager
- Elijah Embree Hoss (1849–1919), American bishop
- George W. Hoss (1824-1906), American educator
- Hal E. Hoss (1892–1934), American journalist and politician
- Luke Hoß (born 2001), German politician
- Nina Hoss (born 1975), German actress and singer
- Selim Hoss (1929–2024), Lebanese politician
