= History of Elmina =

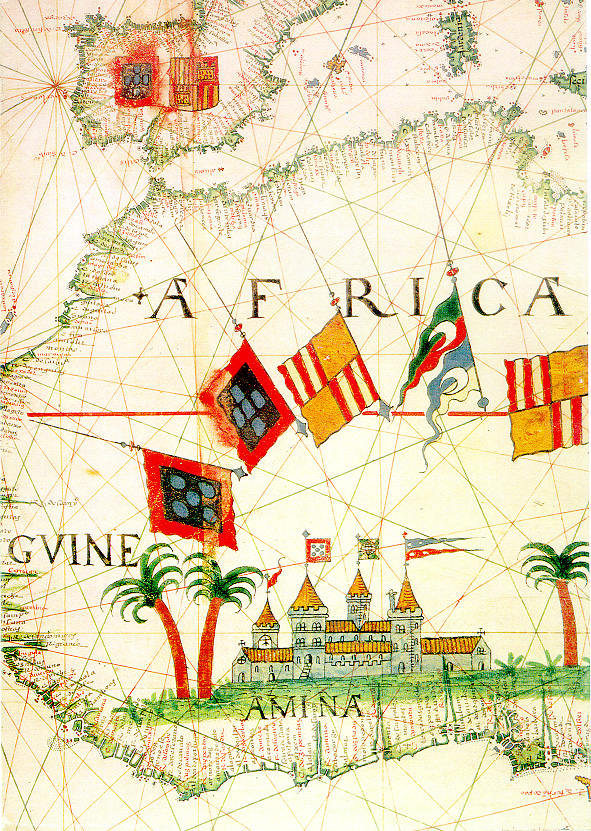
16th century map of West Africa shows the importance of Elmina

The documented history of Elmina, a town in what is now Ghana, begins in 1482 with an agreement between the Portuguese navigator Diogo de Azambuja and the ruler of Elmina, called Caramansa by the Portuguese. In it, the Portuguese were allowed to build the first European fortress in sub-Saharan Africa. For the next 150 years until the conquest by the Dutch in 1637, Elmina was the capital of the Portuguese bases on the Gold Coast, then for about 250 years the capital of the Dutch Empire in West Africa. Since the capture of the lease for the two fortresses of Elmina by the Ashanti in 1701, the city was also important to the Ashanti Empire. Until the 19th century, Elmina was one of the most populous cities in the Gold Coast, surpassing Accra and Kumasi. The trade in gold, slaves and palm oil brought the city into direct contact with Europe, North America, Brazil and, through the recruitment of soldiers, also with Southeast Asia. It was not until the takeover and destruction of the city by the British in 1873 that Elmina lost its prominent position in the Gold Coast.

== Elmina before the arrival of the Portuguese ==
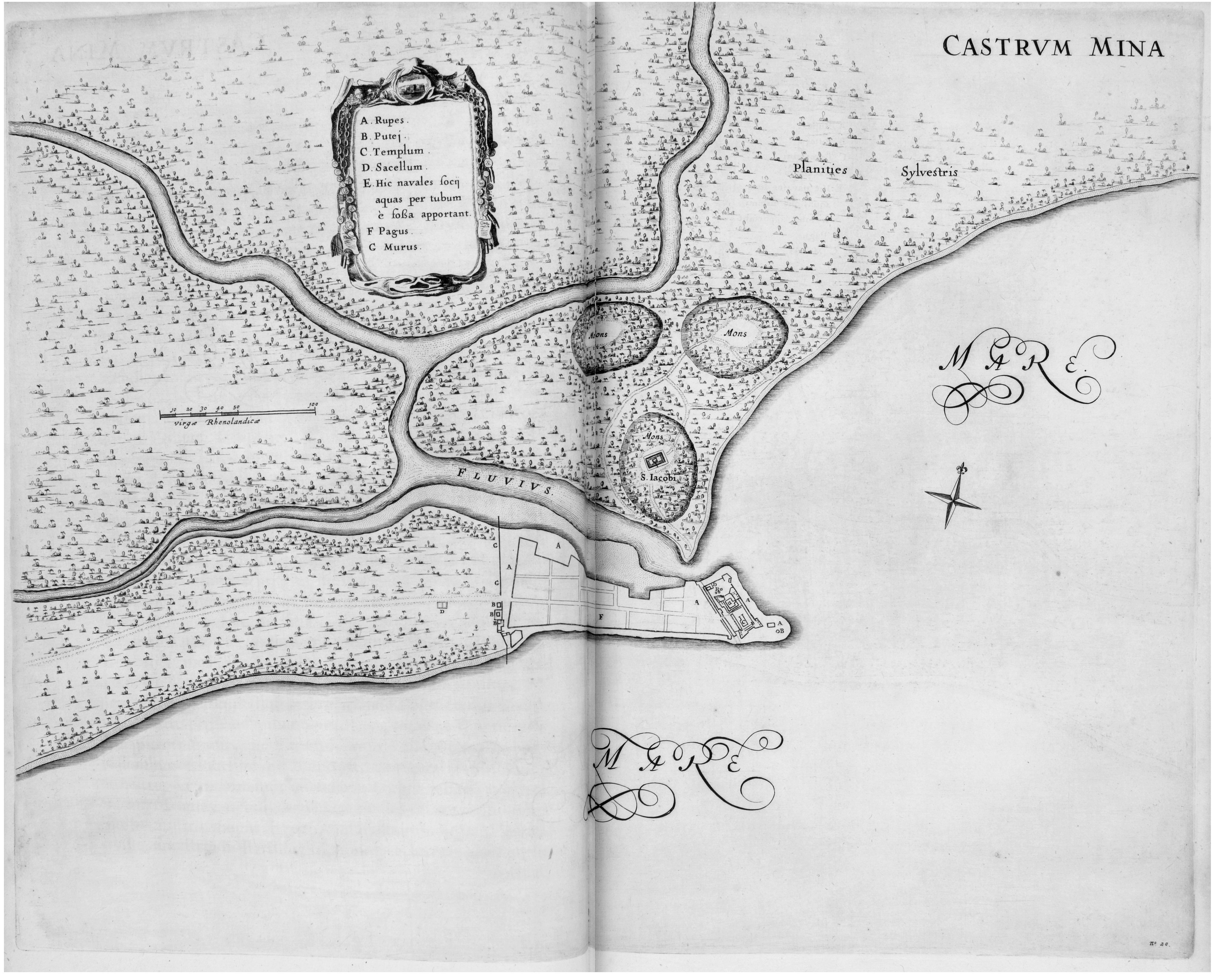
Map of Elmina 1647, the city is limited to the South Peninsula

Elmina today extends over two peninsulas, north and south of the Benya River. The settlement of the southern peninsula has been documented since at least the year 1000 AD. The settlement of the North Peninsula began in modern times. Before the arrival of the Portuguese at the end of the 15th century, the population was probably a few hundred people and Elmina was thus one of the larger settlements of the coastal section later called the Gold Coast. In addition, 100 years before the arrival of the Portuguese, its inhabitants were already in trade with the Akan people of the inland area via the salt trade. Through these indigenous people, Elmina was connected to several trade routes of West Africa such as the Trans-Saharan trade routes.

=== A village divided into two ===
Elmina was located on the border between two ancient Guan states, Komenda (also known as Eguafo) and Fetu. Since the Portuguese also called the later Elmina "Aldea das duas Partes", which translates as "village of two parts", it has been assumed that before the arrival of the Portuguese, there were two different fishing villages on both banks of the Benya Lagoon, one of which belonged to Eguafo and the other to Fetu. Archaeological investigations in the 1990s has shown that there was no settlement north of the Benya before the arrival of the Portuguese. Both halves of old Elmina were located on the southern peninsula. The one settlement core was located immediately west of today's Elmina Castle (and partly buried under the castle today); the other part about 400 meters west was situated at Bantuma. The reason for the division of the village into two parts may have been that both parts were located at the elevated points of the peninsula and the area in between was occasionally flooded.

Later Dutch maps show that the areas in the west and northwest of Elmina were dominated by Eguafo / Komenda, while the areas in the east were dominated by Fetu. At the time of the arrival of the Portuguese, the rulers of both states made claims to Elmina.

The unresolved question to the political affiliation of the original Elmina has led to various speculations. For example, a phonetic similarity between the word "Caramansa", which was used to refer to the "King of Elmina" in the first Portuguese reports, and the title of ruler "Mansa" of the Mandinka people from the Sahel region, led to a conclusion that Mandinka traders ruled in Elmina before the Portuguese period. Apart from the sound similarity, there is no evidence of this. Since the term Caramansa no longer appears except in the earliest reports, it is more likely that the Mandinka term was used by an African translator as a general term for "ruler".

== The Portuguese period (1482–1637) ==
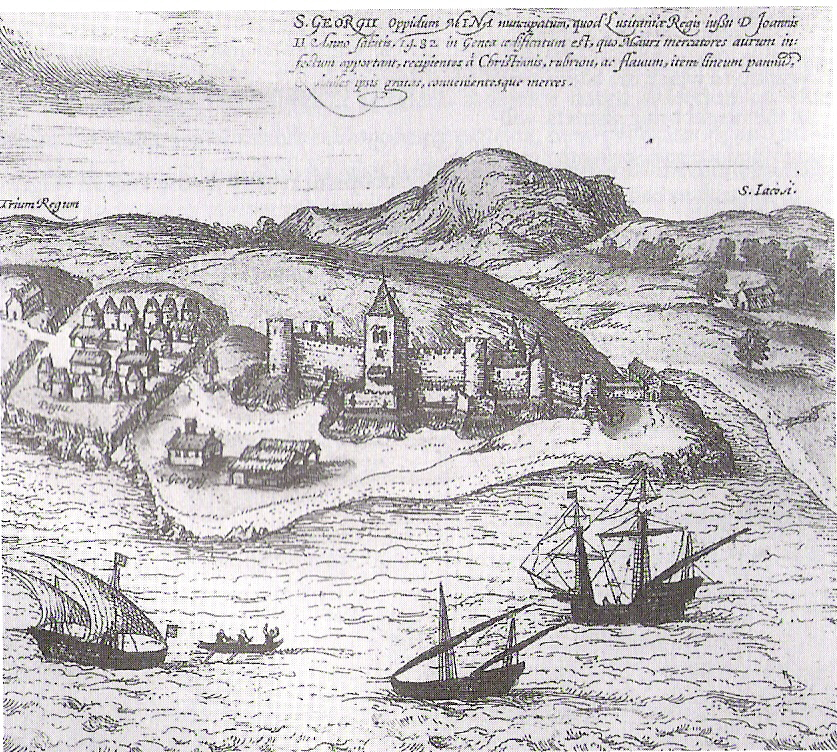
Early, idealized depiction of the city of Elmina from 1575

In 1471, the Portuguese first explored the coast off Elmina on behalf of the Lisbon merchant Fernão Gomes. Around 1482 they returned with a fleet of 10 caravels and two cargo ships under the command of Diogo de Azambuja. (Note: other sources speak of six ships) De Azambuja was commissioned to build a fortress on this site. He carried the necessary materials intended for the construction of a fortress on his ships according to European sources. The locals were interested in trading with the Portuguese and were friendly to them as long as the trade was from the Portuguese ships. The plan to build a fortress at Elmina was met with rejection. The negotiating partner of the Portuguese was a local ruler named Kwamina Ansa, called Caramansa by the Portuguese. A flowery speech by Caramansa has been handed down, which amounted to the fact that "friends who see each other occasionally remain better friends than if they became neighbors." Caramansa gave his consent for the construction of the fort after the Portuguese threatened with violence. Caramansa still prohibited the use of the sacred local rock, known to the native Elminans as Kokobo, to build the fort. He also denied the Portuguese access to their freshwater supply. The destruction of the Kokobo rocks for construction purposes by de Azambuja's men sparked outrage from the people of Elmina. The Portuguese managed to avoid conflict after they sent gifts to Caramansa and his officials. The construction of the Fort São Jorge da Mina began on 21 January 1482. The Portuguese built a rectangular fortress with towers at every corner on the elevated eastern end of the peninsula and called it Castelo de São Jorge da Mina, the fortress of St. George of Mina, now known as Elmina Castle. They called the place itself "El Mina", which means "The Mine", as a reference to the place as the source of the gold they wanted to negotiate. Diogo de Azambuja was appointed the first of 48 governors of Elmina. The governors of Elmina were also governors of all later Portuguese possessions on the Gold Coast.

It was no coincidence that Elmina became the site of the first European fortress on the Gold Coast. What spoke in favour of this place was that there was already an African settlement of noteworthy size as a prerequisite for trade and the use of local labour. The coast of later Ghana – in contrast to the inland – hardly had any larger villages at that time. A spring from 1479 by Eustache de la Fosse, for example, mentions only Elmina and Shama to the west as noteworthy port towns. Even in this area, it took three to four days in the 15th century before the news of the arrival of a ship had spread by drumming and the merchants had arrived there with their goods. In addition, the natural conditions were ideal. The rocky peninsula, located between Benya Lagoon and ocean, made it easier to defend against an enemy. The lagoon also served as a natural harbor. On the peninsula, there was also the possibility of mining sandstone for the construction of the fortress. De Azambuja did not carry the complete material for the construction of the fortress, as indicated in some sources, but only prefabricated stones for the foundations, archways and window openings. Most of the material for the fortress came from a quarry on the peninsula. Decisive for the interest of the Portuguese in the entire coastal section was that from there, the trade routes inland led to the sources of gold in the Ashanti area. Since salt had already been extracted in Elmina before the arrival of the Europeans and transported inland from there, a trade route to the interior already existed at the time of the arrival of the Portuguese.

=== Origin of the state of Elmina ===
The city of Elmina, formerly subordinate to Fetu or Komenda, became an independent political entity through the alliance with the Portuguese in the first decades of the 16th century and later became the state of Elmina. The state increasingly expanded its territorial sphere of influence.

=== Population in Portuguese times ===
There is no reliable information on the development of the city's population in Portuguese times. It can be assumed that the rapid growth of the urban population already began at that time. The adjacent view of Elmina from the year of the conquest by the Dutch shows a large African settlement west of the fortress. Whether it had more than several hundred inhabitants is unclear. In any case, their growth is more likely to have been through immigration, especially from the surrounding villages, than through natural birth growth. The European population in the city was low in Portuguese times. When Azambuja built the fortress of Sao Jorge da Mina, he had 63 Europeans with him. At no time in the Portuguese period did more Europeans live in the city, and at the time of the Dutch conquest, the Portuguese garrison consisted of 35 men. The commanders came mainly from the lower nobility of Portugal and many of the common men were sentenced to exile in Elmina for offences. A contemporary listing in 1529 lists only four women among Elmina's Europeans, all convicted. From the Portuguese-African connections emerged the group called Mulattos. Their number can only be estimated. It is documented that after the capture of Elmina by the Dutch, the Mulattos received a special permit to settle with the Portuguese garrison on the island of São Tomé and 200 of them remained in Elmina.

=== Cityscape in Portuguese times ===
The African settlement of Elmina extended directly from the walls of the fortress westwards, limited by the natural conditions (location between the ocean, lagoon and swampy lowlands) and a ban on settlement that the Portuguese issued after the construction of the fortress for the eastern part of the peninsula around their castle. The fortress itself was built in the style of medieval castles: rectangular with towers at the four corners. (Note: van Danzig also depicts in a drawing, a moat on the land side, which was absent in the work of De Corse.) Probably during the 2nd half of the 16th century, the Portuguese built a cannon-reinforced wall to protect the city, a few hundred meters west of the fortress, which protected the entire settlement from the land side. The "urban area" of Elmina, enclosed by the wall and the sea or lagoon, thus covered an area of about three hectares. An indication of the hygienic conditions Elmina is given by the report of a contemporary observer, de Marees, who wrote in 1602 that the city could be smelled at sea in wind from land at a distance of 2.5 kilometers.

=== Relationship between Portuguese and locals of Elmina ===
The Portuguese did not exercise unfettered power over the population of Elmina. Although the locals accepted it as a power that could settle disputes between Ghanaians. This is probably due to the role of the Portuguese as neutral outsiders. The Portuguese were able to impose a tax on fish and newly elected local Ghanaian leaders were officially recognized by them. At the same time, the Portuguese were dependent on the cooperation of the Ghanaians. As a last resort in the event of dissatisfaction with European powers, the locals were left with the effective means of leaving the city. Significant is a letter from the Portuguese king to the governor of Elmina from 1523. In it, he expressed his concern that the people there were being treated too harshly, resulting in the city's depopulation. By royal decree in 1529, the first school for locals was established in Elmina, where writing, reading and Sacred Scripture were taught.

The Portuguese forbade (as later the Dutch) the enslavement of locals in the surrounding area of Elmina. A royal decree of 1615 mentions a radius of ten leguas (about 50 kilometers) around the city. Elmina was never a source of slaves. Throughout this period, the Portuguese imported slaves into Elmina and paid for the gold of the Ashanti with thousands of people from the slave coast. The later importance of the city for the slave trade was based on its function as a transit station for deported people from the 17th century onwards. In 1486 Elmina was granted Portuguese town rights. According to individual sources, the city rights only referred to the fortress there and not to the African settlement. Very early on, a Portuguese-based pidgin developed in Elmina, which later developed into the lingua franca throughout the Coast. It was still used decades after the expulsion of the Portuguese in contact between Ghanaians and Europeans. From the beginning of their presence at Elmina, the Portuguese tried to convert the locals into the Catholic faith through which several churches and chapels were built. The most famous is a small chapel built in 1503 on the hill above the city, where the Dutch fortress Fort Coenraadsburg was later to be built. A stumbling block for the Portuguese in Elmina was the bureaucratic and inefficient organization of their rule, which was based on direct instructions from Lisbon. The governor's post was usually used as an opportunity for personal enrichment. At the same time, the Portuguese mainland was often unable to guarantee a sufficient supply of the garrison. Unlike later colonial powers, the Portuguese did not train craftsmen or other skilled workers among the locals. For instance, bricklayers to repair the fortress walls were regularly brought from Portugal. From 1514, there were joint military actions by the population of Elmina and the Portuguese. After the papal ban on selling firearms to Africans had already been lifted in 1481, the Portuguese began to arm their Ghanaian allies. Warriors from Elmina also manned the ramparts of the fortress.

== The Dutch period (1637–1872) ==
Five times the Dutch had tried in vain to capture the Portuguese fortress in Elmina: in 1596, 1603, 1606, 1615 and 1625. Each time the invasions had been resisted with the support of Ghanaian residents. Even several attempts to conquer the city after the walls of the fortress and a bastion were severely damaged by an earthquake in 1615 failed. In 1625, the Dutch tried to take Elmina again with a fleet of 15 ships under Jan Dirckszoon Lam. This invasion resulted in failure with great losses due to the counterattack of Ghanaian allies organized by the Portuguese governor Francisco de Sotomaior. In August 1637, the Dutch initiated an attack once more with nine ships and about eight hundred soldiers off Elmina. After three days, they took the fort on August 29 with the support of about 1000 to 1400 armed Africans from Eguafo and Asebu.

Decisive for the capture of the fortress was a great strategic mistake of the Portuguese: on the north peninsula directly opposite the fortress, there was a hill from which it was possible to shoot into the fortress with cannons. This hill had only been secured by an insignificant Redoubt. With the conquest of the hill, the fortress was no longer defensible. The Dutch left behind a garrison of about 150 soldiers and strengthened the fortifications by building a fortress on the mentioned hill, which they called Coenraadsburg. The Dutch (more precisely: the Dutch West India Company) declared Elmina the capital of their entire African possessions. The Governor-general of Elmina therefore also bore the title "Governor-General of the Northern and Southern Coasts of Africa".

=== Relationship between the locals and the Dutch ===
As in Portuguese times, the relationship between Europeans and Ghanaians in Elmina under Dutch control was marked by interdependence and the pursuit of mutual advantage in trade. The Dutch supported the people of Elmina in times of conflicts with neighboring states as well as vice versa. Nevertheless, the 250-year relationship was not without conflicts. Thus, in 1739/40 there were violent clashes between Elmina and Dutch when the then Governor General de Bordes refused to allow the fishermen from Elmina to pass through the Benya River into the ocean. and in 1808 residents of Elmina murdered Governor Hoogenboom in revenge for attacks by the Dutch.

In the Dutch period, Elmina's own political structures continued to develop. This led to an increased self-confidence of the local lords of the city towards the Dutch. It was not until the first half of the 18th century that the Dutch increasingly regarded the inhabitants as their subjects, although the locals rejected this notion. The Dutch paid tribute (for the Dutch it was called "food money") for Elmina to the Kingdom of Denkyira and later to the Ashanti Empire.

=== The Asafo societies ===
By the 18th century, Asafo societies were of decisive importance for the power structure in the city. The institution of the Asafo preceded the emergence of the office of the Omanhene. They had and still have both ritual and military tasks. Each Asafo society included a shrine and a flag. They also formed military units in the event of war. Such male alliances also existed in other Akan societies of the coast, but in Elmina they had a much stronger position in the political structure of the city or the state. The king (edenahee) of Elmina was appointed by the Asafos and the Asafo leaders received a larger amount of the notes also called "food money", from the Dutch than the king. The besonfo, a council of wealthy representatives of Elmina, which emerged in the 19th century, also had its origins in the Asafo system. In 1724 there were seven Asafo societies: Ankobia, Akim, Encodjo, Apendjafoe (Benyafoe, Benya, Wombir), Abesi, Allade (Adjadie, Abadie, Adadie) and Enyampa. The Asafos were each assigned to districts known as Kwartieren. Three more Asafo socieites were created in the 19th century. Two of these new Asafos consisted of refugees from Simbo and Eguafo who had settled in Elmina after the Fante War of 1810. The 10th and last Asafo Society called Akrampa arose from the slaves of the Dutch West India Company and their descendants, the Free Burghers.

=== Royalty ===
The institution of a single ruler for the city and state of Elmina did not emerge until the 18th century. In 1732, a "King of Elmina" appeared for the first time in European reports as a new institution. The Omanhene became the political, military and religious leader of Elmina. In contrast to the traditions of the other Akan peoples, this position was and is inherited patrilineally. The Omanhene must belong to a specific Asafo (Enyampa Asafo) and come from either the Anona or the Nsona clan. Contemporary Dutch sources highlight an "Oberkönig" and a "2." or "3. King" in Elmina. There is evidence that the function of the Omanhene rotated for a time under the sub-kings. Gradually an exact succession was established.

=== Rule in Elmina before the emergence of royalty and Asafo ===
Knowledge of the political institutions in Elmina immediately after the independence of the city from Fetu or Kommenda around 1500 to the year 1730 is largely limited to indications of what did not exist. There was no direct rule of the Portuguese or Dutch over the African city. In addition, the city lacked a centralized ruler during this period. Portuguese sources of the 17th century speak of three "caboceers" or leaders of Elmina in three different districts. They also note that the natives organized themselves as in a republic. Higher-level disputes, on the other hand, were brought to the Portuguese and later to the Dutch who were viewed as neutral parties. De Corse quotes a Dutch Governor-General from 1639 about the inhabitants of Elmina, who "present all events to the (Dutch) Governor-General, since they have no king, and they insist on their rights in such a way that they would rather take a life in danger than be deprived of their rights by a king.

=== Population development in Dutch times ===
==== Africans ====
The population of Elmina rose sharply in the Dutch period. In the 18th century it probably amounted between 12,000 and 16,000 people and in the 19th century it rose again to 18,000 to 20,000 people. Throughout the Dutch period, people from other parts of the coastal region of what later became Ghana asked for permission to settle at the city. In the 17th and 18th centuries it was people of Akan descent from Fetu, Eguafo, Akyim and Denkyira, as well as refugees from the wars between the Ashanti and Wassa, who came to Elmina. In addition, non-Akan ethnic groups such as the Ewe and Ga people from eastern Ghana, settled in Elmina. It is also possible that Dioula and Mande merchants had settled in the city. For the right of residence, the new citizens needed the consent of the Dutch and often they had to take an oath of allegiance, which included the promise of certain work achievements for the Europeans. Slaves also contributed to this heterogeneous African population, who had been brought to the city since Portuguese times, mostly from the slave coast, but only now reached a significant proportion of the city's population. Slaves in Elmina like most Akan societies, did not have a lawless status as they were incorporated into the Abusua or matrilineal family unit of the Akan.

==== Europeans ====
Europeans never made up a significant proportion of the city's population. In Portuguese times, their number never exceeded the 63 men who remained there with Governor Azambuja after the construction of the fortress. At the time of the conquest by the Dutch, there were 35 Europeans in the fortress. In the Dutch period, however, the number of Europeans increased. In the 17th century there were over 100 people. This figure went up to 377 Europeans in the 18th century. They often came from workhouses, orphanages and prisons. Europeans in Elmina were of diverse background including Germans, French or Flemish. From the middle of the 18th century, the number of Europeans fell when the West India Company increasingly took Africans and descendants of Dutch and Africans into its service for cost reasons. In the 19th century, the number of Dutch people in Elmina fell once more and never exceeded 20 people.

==== Tapojeires and Free Burghers ====
As in Portuguese times, there were strong relation between Dutch and African women from Elmina. Until the early 18th century, marriages between Europeans and African women were rare and required permission from the Governor-General. There were significantly more children from illegitimate European-African connections in Elmina. The Dutch named these children Tapoeijers. In 1700 there was a decree of the Governor-General stating that children of such descent were either to be taken in by their Dutch fathers on their return to the Netherlands or that the fathers had to pay a reasonable sum for the further Christian education of their children within Elmina. In addition, a house was built in the city, in which such children were taught until the age of 5 or 6 years in writing, basics of the economy, in individual crafts and in agriculture.

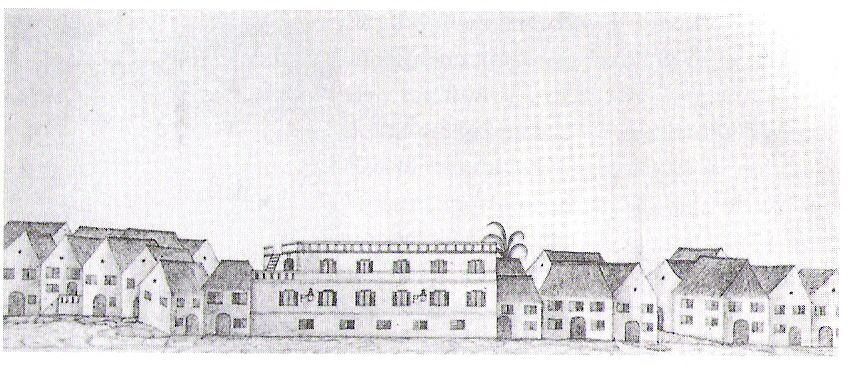
House of the merchant Johan Neizer 1792

Many of Elmina's Euro-Africans became successful traders. Prominent examples include Jan Niezer, who visited Europe several times and maintained direct trade contact with European and American companies. Part of this group acquired a special status and was called Free Burghers. They received the same rights as the Dutch and organized themselves in their own Asafo society (Akrampa). Their Burgermeester independently concluded contracts with the Dutch. Every Free Burgher had the right to carry a sword. Many Euro-Africans worked in the lower echelons of the city's Dutch administration, and in the 19th century many of them sent their children to school in the Netherlands or England. Well-known Free Burghers were Carel Hendrik Bartels and Jacob Huydecoper. It was unusual that many girls from this group were also sent to school in Europe. In the 19th century, the Free Burghers settled mainly north of the Benya Lagoon.

=== Development of the city in Dutch times ===
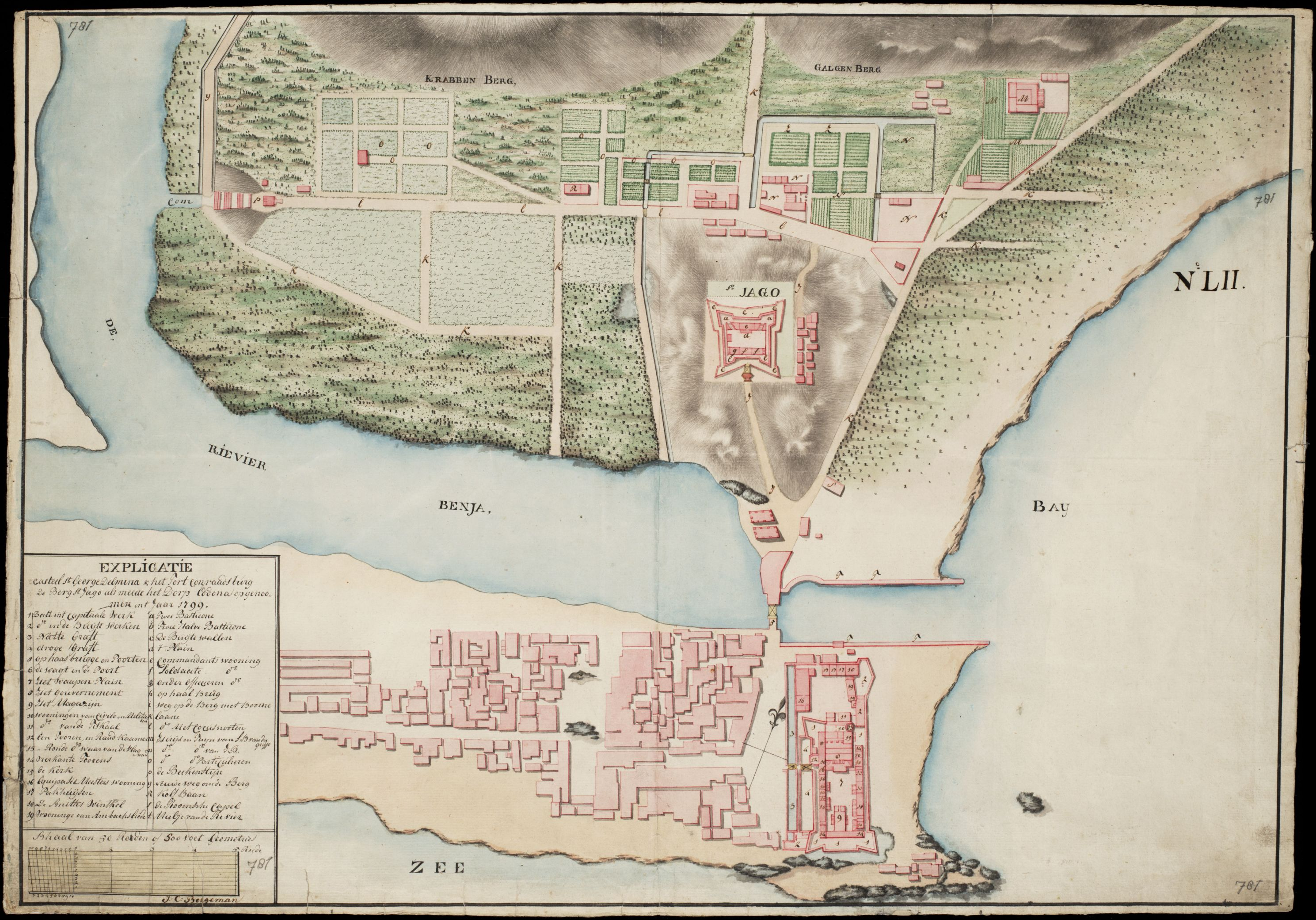
Plan of Elmina 1799, with bridge over the Benya, Fort Conraadsburg, the "gardens" and houses on the North Peninsula

In the Dutch period, the cityscape of Elmina changed. Furthermore, the city was characterized by a very irregular, chaotic floor plan and extraordinarily dense settlement. Contemporary maps and representations that show a regular floor plan of the city are idealizations that contradict contemporary descriptions. Stone houses were built early on to a considerable extent, by local craftsmen. Until the 19th century, the high number of stone houses such as the multi-storey stone house of the Elmina merchant and Free Burghers Johan Neizer depicted above distinguished the cityscape of Elmina from that of many cities on the Gold Coast.

The Dutch tried several times unsuccessfully to take urban planning measures, in particular to widen the streets in order to better counter the constant threat of fires. Documented is, for example, such an attempt from 1837, when a fire had destroyed 90 houses. The opportunity seemed favorable to cut new roads through the city and the Dutch had the planned routes staked out with bamboo sticks. Certain Elmina women, removed the marking sticks with inflammatory warning signs. The Dutch then imprisoned the king and some elders as a result. This measure and the attempt to send 32 recruits into the city with rams to tear down the foundations of the burnt houses on the future route resulted in failure and the new roads were not built. In the 18th century, the city began to expand to the northern peninsula, where the Coenraadsburg is located. As early as the 17th century, a drawbridge had been built over the lagoon, which encouraged gradual settlement and provided access to the West India Company gardens below Conraadsburg. The drawbridge was equipped with guard houses at both ends to deny foreign Africans access to the city. For the first half of the 18th century, Feinberg estimated the population of Elmina at about 12,000–16,000 people.

==== Fortifications in the 19th century ====
In the last decades of their rule, the Dutch built several fortifications around the city, which, unlike the two large fortresses, were intended to repel attacks from the interior. The first was Fort Beekestein, built in 1792 or 1793 about 300 meters west of Fort St. Jago (the Coenraadsburg) on the Benya Lagoon. It was a round redoute, built of stone and clay on a hill that offered a good overview of the area north of the settlement. When the Fante besieged the city in 1811, Fort Wakzaamheid ("Vigilance") was built at the end of the South Peninsula. Due to dilapidation, this complex was replaced between 1817 and 1829 by the Veerssche Schanz fort, which was named after the general director Jakobus de Veer. Several more redoutes were constructed in the 1820s with Fort Schomerus on the "Coebergh" (cow hill) and with the later Fort Java on the "Cattoenbergh" (cotton hill) on the North Peninsula. In 1869, shortly before the end of Dutch rule, Fort Nagtglas (named after the Dutch Governor General Nagtglas) was built at the northern end of the North Peninsula. (Note: Some sources mention the names of these facilities as alternative names for the two large fortresses. This is incorrect since traces of some of these redouts can still be found today.)

=== Belanda Hitam in Elmina ===
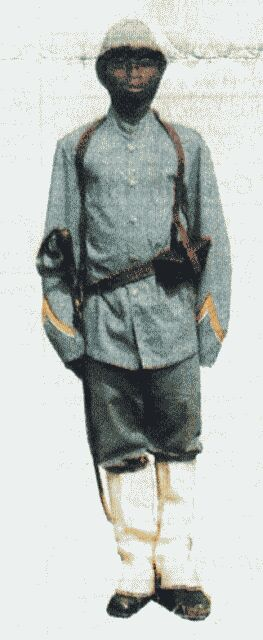
Elmina recruit for the Royal Netherlands East Indies Army

In the 1830s, the Dutch found a new way to take advantage of their increasingly deficient possession of Elmina after the abolition of the slave trade. They persuaded the leaders of Elmina to promote the enrolment into the Royal Netherlands East Indies Army, among their subjects. They lured with a secure income, the opportunity to see the world, and the prospect of old-age security. About 100 men, especially from Afro-European families of Elmina and Accra, were recruited for the Dutch colonial army during this phase. Later, the Dutch concluded a treaty with the king of the Ashanti Empire for the recruitment of further recruits, who were brought via Elmina to the Dutch East Indies in today's Indonesia. These recruits were known as Belanda Hitam. Between 1831 and 1872, about 3,000 Africans were deployed to the Dutch East Indies. At the end of the service, a smaller part of the Belanda Hitam returned to Elmina. There they were assigned plots behind Fort Coonradsburg on a hill that is still called Java Hill today. The Belanda Hitam also appointed one of their own as leaders of their community and thus acted as a group for a time. Today there is no group in Elmina that can be identified as descendants of the Dutch colonial soldiers. The memory of this common Ghanaian-Indonesian history has been maintained at Elmina has been preserved in its own Java Museum. Another legacy of Elmina's connection with Java is the art of batik, which spread over large parts of West Africa from Elmina.

=== Elmina and the Ashanti Empire ===
Elmina and the Ashanti have been linked by a 200-year-long alliance. In 1701, the Ashanti, during the reign of Osei Tutu I, defeated the army of the Denkyira, to which the Dutch at that time paid notes in the form of rent or regular gifts. The Ashanti captured the Elmina Note, a document in which this lease was regulated. Even though there was disagreement between Ashanti and the Dutch about the nature of these payments, the Dutch regularly paid two ounces of gold per month for Elmina to the new regional power which was the Ashanti Empire. For the first time, the Ashanti had direct access to the sea via Elmina and to trade with a European power (the Dutch). This resulted in an alliance between the city of Elmina along with the Dutch as well as the Ashanti. This alliance was opposed on the other hand by a similar alliance between the Fante (to which Elmina belonged linguistically and culturally) and the British. For example, in 1810, 1828 and 1829, the Fante besieged the city. The Ashanti also refused to conclude a peace treaty with the British and Fante because it did not include Elmina. The conflict over Elmina after the handover of the city to the British in 1871 by the Dutch was ultimately the reason for the invasion of southern Ghana by the Ashanti in 1873, which ended with the military defeat of the Ashanti and the Treaty of Fomena, in which the Ashanti had to renounce any claim to southern Ghana.

=== Retreat of the Dutch and destruction of the city ===
In 1850, for the first time, the Dutch made serious efforts to get rid of their possession of Elmina, which had become unprofitable after the prohibition of the slave trade. The inhabitants of the city then sent a letter to the Dutch king, protesting against the planned sale to the British and pointing to the 250-year-old joint connection. The plan to sell the possessions in Elmina was dropped but probably not because of this letter. In 1867, the Dutch and the British decided on a mutual exchange of fortresses on the Gold Coast. The areas west of Elmina were to become Dutch, while those a few kilometres to the east were to become British. Although Elmina was to remain Dutch, the city was drawn into conflicts that ultimately ended in its destruction.

The plan met with fierce opposition from various villages previously under British influence, which were now to become Dutch. These villages feared that the change of ownership would sooner or later fall to the Ashanti, the traditional allies of the Dutch and Elminas. This threat led to the unification of the hitherto divided Fanti states into the Council of Mankessim, the later Fante Confederacy. The Fante formed a common army and moved to Elmina in March 1868 with the aim of expelling the Dutch. In April, the Fanti Army was strong enough to begin an effective siege of the city. In May of the same year, however, after a failed attack on the city, disagreements arose among the Fante, which led to the end of the siege. At the end of June, a peace treaty was concluded between the Fanti Confederacy and the city of Elmina. In the treaty, Elmina was committed to neutrality in the event of an attack by the Fanti by the Ashanti. A blockade of the city, which was completely surrounded by the territory of the Fante Confederacy, remained in place in 1869 and 1870. As a result, Elmina's trade with the Ashanti came to a standstill. Attempts to persuade Elmina to join the Fante Confederacy failed. Elmina was the only place in the Fante settlement area that did not join the Confederation.

Elmina and the Dutch sent a formal request for help to the Asantehene and on December 27, 1869, an Ashanti force under its captain Ajeampon arrived in Elmina. Eventually, the inhabitants of Elmina and the Dutch withdrew from Ashanti influence and prevented any compromise with the Fante as well as the British. In July 1870, news reached Elmina that the Dutch had lost interest in their possessions there due to the ongoing conflicts on the Gold Coast, and were willing to leave these possessions, including Elmina, to the British. The Dutch governor of Elmina, Cornelis Nagtglas, tried to convince the inhabitants of Elmina to accept the handover of their city to the British. The situation was complicated by the presence of an Ashanti army in the city, whose leader the Dutch governor Nagtglas had arrested at short notice in April 1871. In a letter to Nagtglas in 1870, the ruling Asantehene Kofi Karikari clearly expressed his claim to the fort and city of Elmina and justified this claim with the Elmina Note, which had transferred the rights of Fort Elmina to the Ashanti with the conquest of the kingdom of Denkyira by the Ashanti. This was documented by the annual tribute that the Dutch paid to the Ashanti for the fort:

The fortress in this square has paid annual tribute to my ancestors from time immemorial until today, due to the right of arms, since we conquered Intim Gackiri, the king of Denkyira, because his ancestors paid 9000 pounds, which the Dutch demanded for this right.

Nagtglas contradicted this view of the Asantehene and in 1871 Kofi Karikari revoked his claim to Elmina against the Dutch. In 1872, the Dutch withdrew from the Gold Coast and the British took over their possessions. The majority of the population of Elmina refused to recognize the British for their rule. The Omanhene of Elmina, Kobina Gyan, explained to the British after they had entered the Elmina Castle, which had been evacuated by the Dutch:

The castle previously belonged to the Dutch government and the people of Elmina were free men, they are not slaves who can be forced to do something. When the [British] governor [of Cape Coast] came to take over the castle, he did not consult me before raising the British flag; if he recognized me as king, he would have done so... The governor offered me a large sum of money as a bribe gift so that the handover would run smoothly and peacefully. I refused to accept the bribery gift because if I had accepted it, the Chiefs [traditional leaders] would have turned their backs on me afterwards and said that I had sold the land for money. (Note: Baesjou quoted from Yarak; Quote: This Castle belonged to the Dutch Government before, and the people of Elmina were free men; they are no slaves to compel them to do anything. When [the British] Governor [at Cape Coast] came to take this Castle he did not consult me before the English flag was hoisted; if he had considered me as king he would have done so… The Governor offered me as a bribe a large sum of money to let the transfer go on smoothly and peaceably. I refused the bribe because had I taken it chiefs would have turned round on me afterwards and said I sold the country for money.)

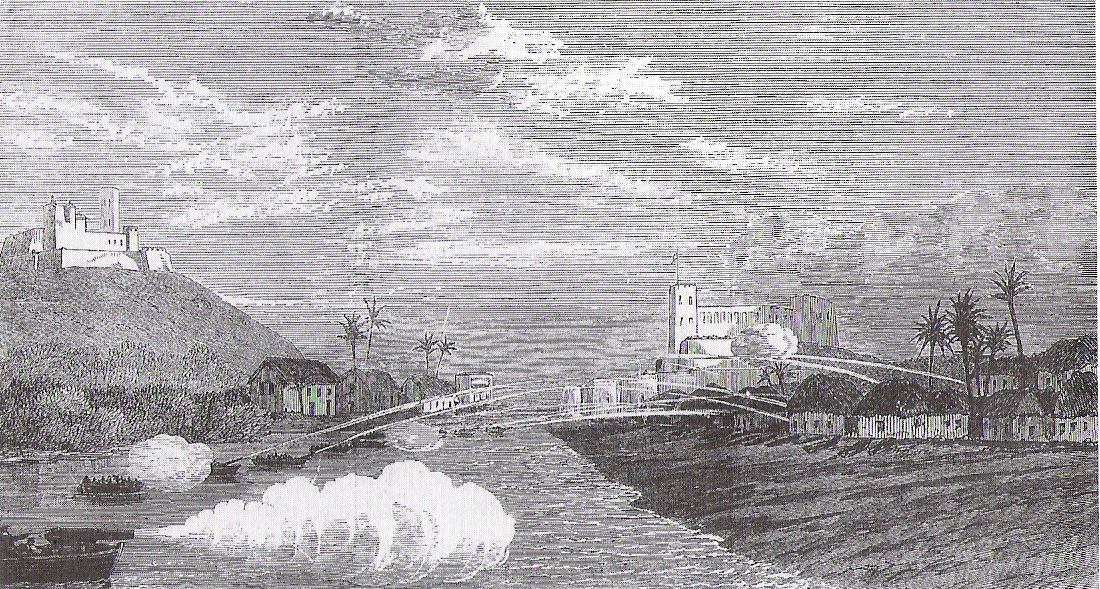

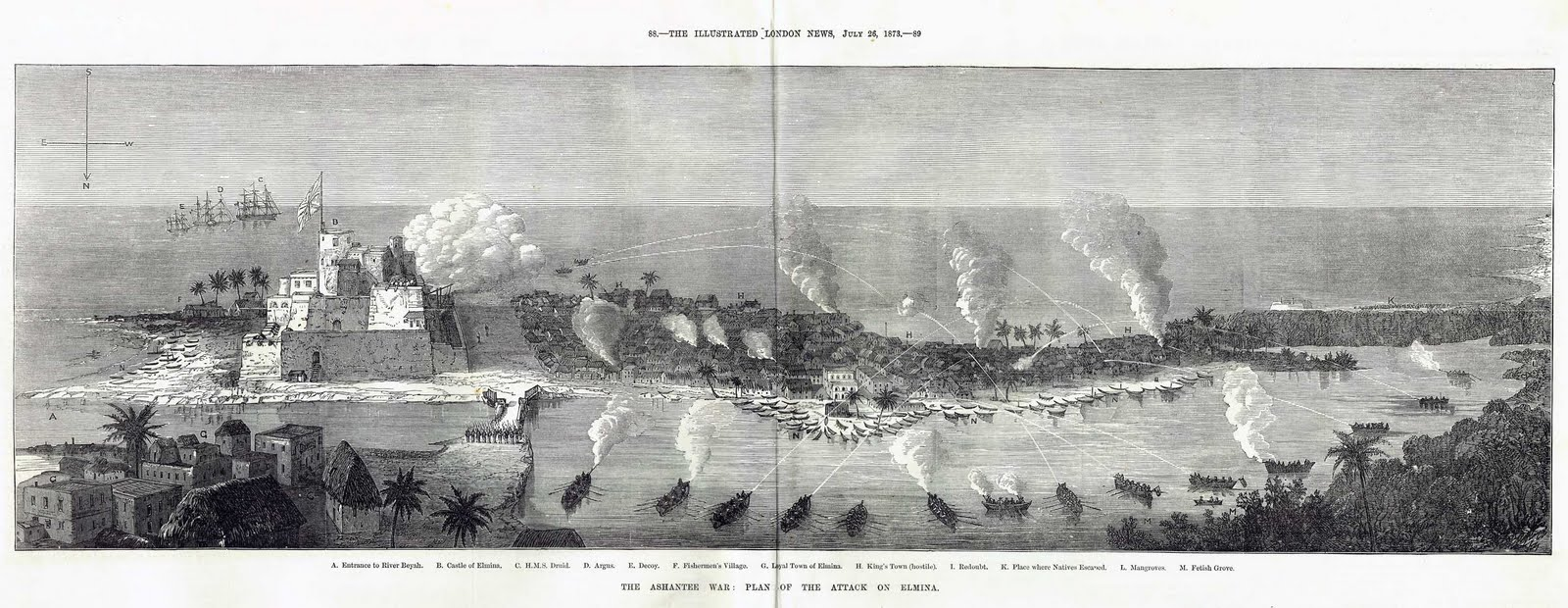

British bombardment of Elmina in 1873

In June 1873, the situation escalated when the Ashanti marched south to regain control over various peoples of southern Ghana and Elmina. The Ashanti invasion was successful until the middle of the year. An Ashanti army marched along the coast towards Elmina, but was halted before reaching Elmina. The British imposed martial law on the city and exiled the Omanhene to their colony of Sierra Leone. After several ultimatums had passed, they began bombing Elmina from warships on June 13, 1873, at 12 noon. Since the population of the city took refuge at the Castle or in the surrounding area, there were no fatalities. The Ashanti military tried to escape from the city, but 200 of them lost their lives fighting in the surrounding area. The British and Fante alliance repulsed the Ashanti invasion. When bombing Elmina, the British distinguished between loyal and disloyal districts or Asafos. Four of the city's eight asafos opposed the British, and four were considered loyal. As disloyal, Kobena Gyan had rejected the British claims to Elmina. As a result, his area of jurisdiction at the city west of the Elmina Castle was bombed and subsequently plundered by British allies from the surrounding Fante states. The parts north of the Benya were spared. The old town of Elmina on the peninsula west of the fort was later destroyed.

== The British period (1873–1957) ==
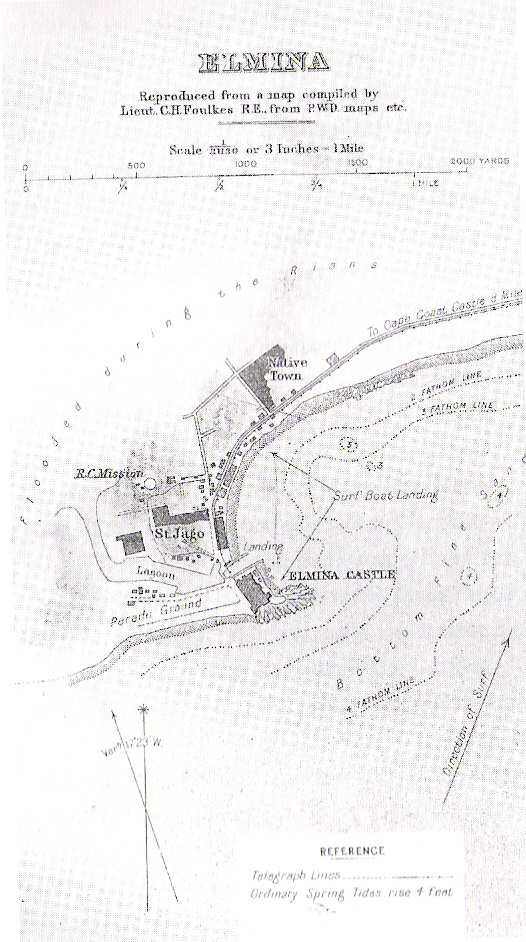
British Plan of Elmina, 1898: Parade Square instead of Old Town, new native town in the north

Following the bombing, the British razed the remains of the city and declared the resulting area a parade ground (see adjacent map). They also prohibited any resettlement of the Elmina Peninsula, as they saw a security risk in a settlement in the immediate vicinity of the fort. This new Elmina was, until today, no longer south but north of the Benya. Under British rule, Elmina lost its prominence for the entire region and experienced colonization for the first time. Elmina was now part of the British crown colony Gold Coast, which had been founded immediately before. From 1880, the Catholic mission of Ghana, initially forbidden by the Dutch, resumed its missions in Elmina, for which the St. Joseph's Minor Basilica Church stands as the oldest Catholic church in the country. At the beginning of the 20th century, the city had less than 4000 inhabitants and thus about a quarter to a fifth of the population in the middle of the 19th century. A large part of the economically active population did not return to the city after the British bombing, but settled in Kumasi and other places. In 1921, the city's port was also closed to trade. The 1920s saw a limited economic upswing of the city as capital from the gold and cocoa business flowed into the city.

== Elmina since independence (1957–present) ==
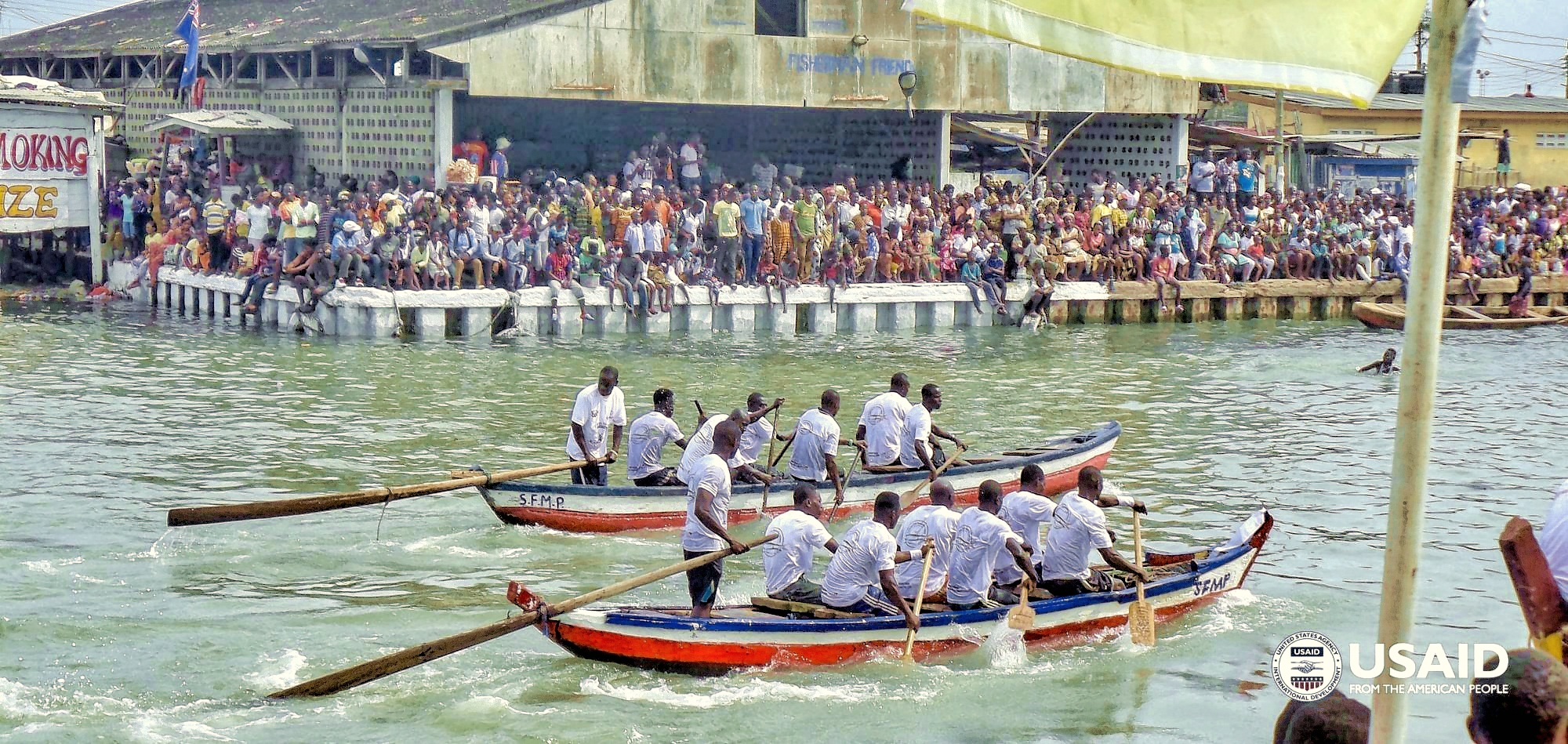
Bakatue Festival in 2016

Ghana's independence in 1957 did not fundamentally change Elmina's peripheral situation. The population increased, as did that of other Ghanaian cities. In 1960 there were 8534 people living in Elmina, ten years later it increased to 12,000. As a major event, the city's history records the visit of Queen Elizabeth II to Elmina in 1960. In 1979, the two fortresses of Elmina were declared a World Heritage Site and tourism has since taken a considerable upswing. At the beginning of the millennium, with considerable financial support from the European Union, the Elmina Heritage Project was launched, a program to restore the historic sites of Elmina, the two fortresses, and several other historic buildings.
