= Cape Coast (Ghana parliament constituency) =

Constituency in the Central Region of Ghana

- constituency for the Parliament of Ghana
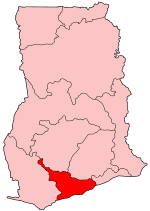
- District: Cape Coast Municipal District
- Region: Central Region of Ghana

Current constituency
- Party: National Democratic Congress
- MP: Ebo Barton-Odro

Awutu-Senya is one of the constituencies represented in the Parliament of Ghana. It elects one Member of Parliament (MP) by the first past the post system of election. Cape Coast constituency is located in the Cape Coast Municipal district of the Central Region of Ghana.

== Boundaries ==
The seat is located entirely within the Cape Coast Municipal district of the Central Region of Ghana.

== Members of Parliament ==
Election	Member	Party	Term
1951	Kwesi Plange	Convention People's Party	1951-1953
1953 by-election	Amponsah Dadzie	Ghana Congress Party	1953-1954
1954	Nathaniel Azarco Welbeck	Convention People's Party	1954-1965
1965	Professor. Kojo Abraham	Convention People's Party	1965-1966
1969	T. D. Brodie-Mends	Progress Party	1969-1972
1979	Dr. Bassa Quansah	Action Congress Party	1979-1981
1992	Harry Hayford	National Convention Party	1992-1996
1996	Christine Churcher	New Patriotic Party	1996-2008
2008	Ebo Barton-Odro	National Democratic Congress	2008-2012

The constituency was split into the Cape Coast North and Cape Coast South constituencies in 2012.

== Elections ==
2008 Ghanaian parliamentary election: Cape Coast Source:Electoral Commission of Ghana
Party	Candidate	Votes	%	±%
National Democratic Congress	Ebo Barton-Odro	38,694	54.1	9.6
New Patriotic Party	Kwamena Ollenu Amponsah-Dadzie	31,426	44.0	−7.2
Convention People's Party	Emmanuel Kweku Sagoe	947	1.3	−2.2
Democratic Freedom Party	Joel Eshun	219	0.3	—
Independent	Ato Aidoo Nyanor	217	0.3	—
Majority		7,268	10.1	3.4
Turnout		72,053	69.5	−16.8

2004 Ghanaian parliamentary election: Cape Coast Source:Electoral Commission of Ghana
Party	Candidate	Votes	%	±%
New Patriotic Party	Christine Churcher	36,264	51.2	−4.5
National Democratic Congress	Ebo Barton-Odro	31,538	44.5	2.9
Convention People's Party	Araba Bentsi-Enchill	2,497	3.5	2.0
People's National Convention	Macdonald Kobbs Tongo	567	0.8	0.1
Majority		4,726	6.7	−7.4
Turnout		71,781	86.3	—

2000 Ghanaian parliamentary election: Cape Coast Source:Adam Carr's Election Archives
Party	Candidate	Votes	%	±%
New Patriotic Party	Christine Churcher	31,573	55.7	3.7
National Democratic Congress	Ebo Barton-Odro	23,550	41.6	−4.4
Convention People's Party	Araba Bentsi-Enchill	846	1.5	—
People's National Convention	Macdonald Kobbs Tong	374	0.7	—
National Reform Party	Kweku Orleans-Lindsay	309	0.5	
Majority		8,023	14.1	6.1
Turnout		—	—	—

1996 Ghanaian parliamentary election: Cape Coast Source:Electoral Commission of Ghana
Party	Candidate	Votes	%	±%
New Patriotic Party	Christine Churcher	30,496	54.0	—
National Democratic Congress	S. Valis - Akyianu	25,932	46.0	—
Majority		4,564	8.0	—
Turnout		56428	85.4	53.7

1992 Ghanaian parliamentary election: Cape Coast Source:Electoral Commission of Ghana
Party	Candidate	Votes	%	±%
National Convention Party	Harry Hayford	—	—	—
Majority		—	—	—
Turnout		12,005	31.7	—

== See also ==
- List of Ghana Parliament constituencies
- Cape Coast Municipal District
- Cape Coast
