= Battle of Príncipe =

- Part of the Dutch–Portuguese War
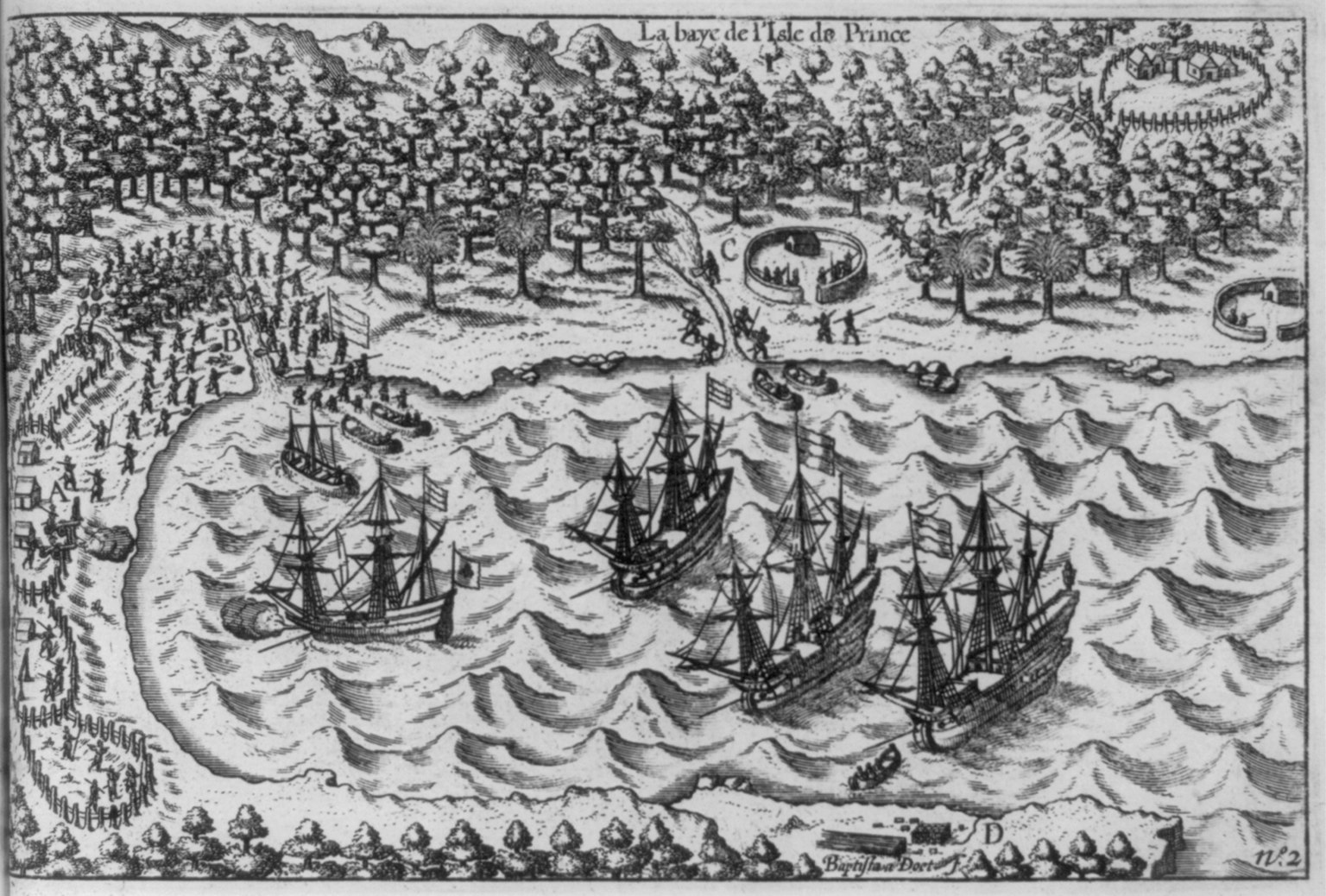
- Dutch ships in Príncipe.
Date	August–November 1598
Location	Santo António, São Tomé and Príncipe
Result	Portuguese victory

Belligerents
Portugal	Dutch Republic

Commanders and leaders
(Portugal) António de Meneses	(Dutch Republic) Julius Cleerhagen † (Dutch Republic) Cornelis de Moucheron

Strength
500 men	350–500 men 5 ships

The Battle of Príncipe was a military action part of the Dutch-Portuguese War. Dutch forces under Lieutenant-Colonel Julius Cleerhagen captured Príncipe Island in August 1598 but they were ousted by the Portuguese a few months later.

== History ==
When the Dutch Revolt broke out against the Habsburgs in the late 16th century, the newly-formed Dutch Republic sought to challenge the Iberians overseas as its merchants were keen to claim a share of the lucrative trade in tropical products.

The Zeeland merchant and ship-owner Balthasar de Moucheron had been trading in West Africa for some years already and he wished to extend the activities of his recently founded Veerse Compagnie to Asia, but to do that he needed a base. He considered that Príncipe Island could serve as a mid-way station for ships bound to the East and to trade in Guinea. The States-General supported his plan with five warships, while de Moucheron pledged to pay the wages of 500 sailors and soldiers, as well as their equipment. The fleet would be commanded by Lieutenant-Colonel Julius Cleerhagen.

The Dutch fleet departed in August with 150 soldiers and 200 sailors and reached Santo António, capital of Príncipe, late in the same month. In Santo António they found a Dutch merchantship, commanded by a nephew of Moucheron, who was well known on the island on account of his business. After meeting with Cleerhagen, he invited the local Portuguese governor and his officials aboard and once they did, they were compelled to surrender Príncipe and take an oath of allegiance to Moucheron, in exchange for their lives. The Dutch thus captured Príncipe without a shot, Cleerhagen was declared General of Príncipe and set to work building a fort.

Three days later, the Portuguese on Príncipe attacked the Dutch on land, but were repulsed and scattered. They returned and submitted in exchange for a pardon, but Cleerhagens did not continue the construction of the planned fortifications nor did he uphold his part of the deal, and so he caused the accord to break down barely five weeks later. The Portuguese therefore planned a new attack, apparently headed by the vicar of Santo António, but the Dutch uncovered this plot and hanged the clergyman along with some of his co-conspirators. Their execution caused the Portuguese on Príncipe to request aid from the Governor of neighbouring São Tomé.

Once news of the situation reached the governor of São Tomé Dom António de Meneses, he organized a 500-strong detachment of troops to recover Santo António. In early November he entered the Bay of Santo António and attacked the Dutch from both land and sea. Cleerhagens troops withstood a Portuguese assault on the partially finished fortress, though with difficulty and in the course of the siege Cleerhagen himself fell to tropical disease, along with many of his men. De Moucherons nephew Cornelis took over jointly with Joris van Spilbergen. They hoped for reinforcements from Europe but none would arrive and by the end of November they surrendered, thus putting an end to the first Dutch overseas colony, "the enemy and the tropical climate having both been disastrously underestimated".

Shortly after the departure of de Moucherons men, a fleet under Olivier van Noort arrived at Principe to obtain fresh supplies. Van Noort sent forty men ashore, of which four went to the Portuguese fort but one was captured and others killed. The captive managed to flee back to the boats but the Portuguese attacked them and killed two more. This prompted Van Noort to land with 120 men and attack the Portuguese on-shore, but he was repelled. The following day, a party of 30 Dutchmen again landed to obtain drinking water and destroy sugar mills but they were ambushed and forced to retreat.

== See also ==
- Battle of Elmina (1625)
- Battle of Elmina (1637)
- Dutch West India Company
