= Samuel Valis-Akyianu =

Ghanaian diplomat and politician

Ghana High Commissioner to the Czech Republic

Ghana ambassador to Serbia and Montenegro

Ghana ambassador to Canada
- President: John Atta Mills

Personal details
- Born: Samuel Valis-Akyianu
- Died: April 2016
- Education: Derbyshire Fire Training School; Fire Service Technical College
- Occupation: Diplomat

Samuel Valis-Akyianu (also known as Chief Akyianu; ? – April 2016) was a Ghanaian diplomat and politician. He was the High Commissioner of Ghana to Canada and served as the Ambassador of Ghana to the Czech Republic and Serbia and Montenegro.

== Early life and education ==
Valis-Akyianu obtained his Certificate in Fire Technology from the Derbyshire Fire Training School in the United Kingdom. He also received his Certificate in Fire Prevention Technology from the Fire Service Technical College in the United Kingdom. He also had his Diploma in Fire Engineering.

== Career ==
On 2 April 1962, Valis-Akyianu began his career in the then Railway Fire Service as a Fireman in Takoradi in the Western Region of Ghana. On 1 April 1964, he joined the Ghana National Fire Service. In 1985, the Provisional National Defence Council (PNDC) appointed him as Acting Chief Fire Officer. In 1988, he was confirmed and appointed as the substantive Chief Fire Officer. He was also the Central Regional Minister. In 2001, he was replaced by Veronica Sharon Boakye Kufuor as the Ambassador of Ghana to the Czech Republic.

In November 2012, he was the High Commissioner of Ghana to Canada. He was also an Ambassador of Ghana to Serbia and Montenegro.

== Politics ==
Valis-Akyianu was a member of the National Democratic Congress (NDC) and was the Central Regional Chairman of the party. He was also a parliamentary candidate and lost to the New Patriotic Party Member of Parliament candidate Christine Churcher. He lost with 25,932 votes making 46% of the total votes cast whiles Churcher had 30,496 votes making 54% of the total votes cast.

== Personal life ==
Valis-Akyianu was married to Love Valis-Akyianu. His mother was Auntie Mercy Tandoh Essel and his siblings were Maame Yaa Akyianu, Kwame Akyianu and Susan Akyianu-Ntsiful. He was the father of Emmanuel Valis-Akyianu, a politician who contested during the Cape Coast North Constituency NDC Primary and lost to Kwamina Mintah Nyarkoh.

== Death ==
Valis-Akyianu died in July 2016.
