= Cape Coast Nurses Training College =

Public college in the Central Region of Ghana

Coordinates: 5.1027°N 1.2568°W

The Cape Coast Nursing and Midwifery Training College is a public tertiary health institution in the Cape Coast in the Central Region of Ghana. The college is in the Cape Coast Metropolitan Assembly. The activities of the institution is supervised by the Ministry of Health. The Kwame Nkrumah University of Science and Technology awards a Diploma in Nursing after students from the institution have successfully completed a three-year nursing training programme. The institution is accredited by the National Accreditation Board. The Nursing and Midwifery Council (N&MC) regulates the activities, curriculum and examination of the student nurses and midwives. The council's mandate is derived from the Health Professions Regulatory Bodies Act, 2013 (Act 857).
