= Sangmorkie Tetteh =

Ghanaian journalist

- Pronunciation: File:Tw-Sangmorkie Tetteh.ogg
- Education: Ghana Institute of Management and Public Administration (GIMPA) Mfantsiman Girls' Senior High School
- Occupations: News anchor, Broadcaster, Journalist

Sangmorkie Tetteh is a Ghanaian media personality. She was the Editor in charge of Digital Unit at the Ghana News Agency (GNA) but resigned to pursue more academic laurels. She was the Deputy News Editor at TV Africa and also hosted the station's major English bulletin – News Hour until she resigned. Sangmorkie has worked with other media houses including Ghana Broadcasting Corporation (GBC), Choice FM, TV3, GHOne, TV Africa and The Ghana News Agency (GNA).

== Education ==
Sangmorkie had her secondary education at the Mfantsiman Girls Senior High School after staying home for four years after basic school. She graduated with a Bachelor of Arts in communications, majoring in development communication from the African University College of Communications (AUCC) and later attained the Bachelor of Laws from Central University. In 2020, she attained a master's degree in international relations and diplomacy from the Ghana Institute of Management and Public Administration(GIMPA).

== Career ==
She is a media consultant in broadcast journalism in TV, radio and print. She is a gender advocate and works within the policy and research sectors. She has almost two decades of experience in journalism and communications having worked with GBC, Choice FM, TV3, GHOne TV and TV Africa. She is currently a steering committee member of the Alliance for Women in Media Africa (AWMA) and an adjunct lecturer at UPSA.

== Legacy ==
She was claimed to have introduced Kase3 Hyew and News Beat which are the mid-morning and the mid-afternoon news bulletins during her time at TV Africa as a Deputy News Editor.
