= WGHS =

WGHS may stand for:

== Schools ==
=== United States ===
- Walden Grove High School in Sahuarita, Arizona
- Watkins Glen High School in Watkins Glen, New York
- Webster Groves High School in Webster Groves, Missouri
- West Gadsden High School in Gadsden County, Florida
- West Geauga High School in Chesterland, Ohio
- West Greene High School (Pennsylvania) in Waynesburg
- West Greene High School (Tennessee) in Mosheim
- Western Guilford High School in Greensboro, North Carolina
- Willow Glen High School in San Jose, California

=== Elsewhere ===
- Westlake Girls High School in Auckland, New Zealand
- Whangarei Girls' High School in Whangarei, New Zealand
- Waitaki Girls' High School in Oamaru, New Zealand
- Wolverhampton Girls' High School in Wolverhampton, United Kingdom
- Wakefield Girls' High School in Wakefield, United Kingdom
- Willoughby Girls High School in Sydney, Australia
- Wesley Girls' High School in Kakumdo, Ghana
- Westville Girls' High School in Westville, South Africa
- Wynberg Girls' High School in Wynberg, South Africa

== Others ==
- Winslow Genealogical & Historical Society in Winslow Township, New Jersey
- WGHS-88.5, a defunct radio station of Glenbard West High School, Glen Ellyn, Illinois
