= Robert Hutchison (mayor) =

Robert Hutchison (23 June 1828-1863) was a businessman and politician active in Cape Coast in the mid nineteenth century. By the 1850s he became one of the principal one of the main palm oil exporters in the city. In 1858 he set up the first Freemasonic lodge in West Africa. Having been one of the first members of the Cape Coast Municipal Council, he served as mayor in 1859.
