= Barbara Asher Ayisi =

Ghanaian politician

Hon Barbara Asher Ayisi

former Member of Parliament for Cape Coast North constituency
- In office 7 January 2017 – 6 January 2021
- Succeeded by: Kwamena Minta Nyarku

Deputy Minister for Education
- In office March 2017 – 6 January 2021
- President: Nana Akufo-Addo

Personal details
- Born: 12 February 1976 (age 50) Effutu, Ghana
- Party: New Patriotic Party
- Children: 2
- Education: University of Cape Coast
- Occupation: Politician
- Profession: Educationist

Barbara Asher Ayisi (born 12 February 1976) is a Ghanaian politician and a former member of parliament for the Cape Coast North constituency in the Central Region of Ghana. She is a member of the New Patriotic Party (NPP) and was the former deputy minister for education in Ghana. She was appointed as the chairperson for the Women's Premier League Super Cup's Local Organizing Committee (LOC).

== Early life and education ==
Barbara Asher Ayisi was born on 12 February 1976 in Effutu, Central Region of Ghana. She is an alumna of Our Lady of Apostles (OLA) College of Education and the University of Education, Winneba. She holds a master's degree in English literature from the University of Cape Coast.

== Employment history ==
Before her election to parliament, she worked as a form mistress between 2003 and 2006 with the Ghana Education Service (GES) and also as a housemistress from 2010 to 2016 at Wesley Girls High School.

== Politics ==
Asher Ayisi is a member of the New Patriotic Party and was a member of parliament for the Cape Coast North constituency in Ghana's Central Region.

=== 2016 election ===
Asher Ayisi contested the Cape Coast North constituency parliamentary seat on the ticket of the New Patriotic Party during the 2016 Ghanaian general election and won with 19,475 votes, representing 49.78% of the total votes. She won the parliamentary seat over Kwabena Owusu Akyeampong of the National Democratic Congress, who pulled 16,309 votes, which is equivalent to 41.69%; parliamentary candidate for the Progressive People's Party (PPP) Sarah Mary Bucknor, who had 3,251 votes representing 8.31%; and the parliamentary candidate for the Convention People's Party Peter Caesar Kwegyir Aggrey pulled 88 votes, representing 0.22% of the total votes.

==== 2020 election ====
Asher Ayisi again contested the Cape Coast North constituency on the ticket of the New Patriotic Party during the 2020 Ghanaian general election but lost the election to Kwamena Minta Nyarku of the National Democratic Congress.

She is the Deputy Minister for Education in charge of basic schools. She has a foundation called the Barbra Asher Foundation, which focuses on reducing unemployment among the youth in her constituency. The Barbra Asher Foundation, in collaboration with Cape Coast Technical University's Entrepreneurship Development and Innovation, has trained more than 200 youth in the Cape Coast constituency in entrepreneurial skills.

== Personal life ==
She is Christian and attends Victory Bible Church International. She is married and has two children.
