= Amamoma =

Community in Central Region, Ghana

- Town
- Country: Ghana
- Region: Central Region
- District: Cape Coast Municipality

Population
  - Total: —
- Time zone: GMT
  - Summer (DST): GMT

Amamoma is a community in the Cape Coast Municipality in the Central Region of Ghana. It is located around the University of Cape Coast. In 2016, the Chief of Amamoma was Nana Yartel III.

== Institution ==
- Imam Khomeini Islamic Basic School
