= Jennifer Lartey =

Ghanaian diplomat

Ghana Ambassador to Norway
- Incumbent
- Assumed office February 2019
- Appointed by: Nana Akufo-Addo
- Preceded by: New

Personal details
- Born: Ghana
- Education: Mfantsiman Girls' Secondary School
- Alma mater: University of Ghana; University of London
- Occupation: Diplomat, Lawyer

Jennifer Lartey is a Ghanaian lawyer and diplomat. She is Ghana's first Ambassador Plenipotentiary and Extraordinary to the Kingdom of Norway.

== Early life and education ==
Jennifer Lartey is a graduate of the University of Ghana. Prior to her tertiary education, she attended Mfanstiman Girls Secondary School where she completed her senior high school education. She also holds a Master’s Degree in Business Administration (MBA) from the University of Ghana and an LLB from the University of London.

== Ambassadorial appointment ==
In February 2019, President Nana Akuffo-Addo named Jennifer Lartey as Ghana's first Ambassador to Norway. She was one of two distinguished Ghanaians who were named to head different diplomatic Ghanaian mission in the world.

== Personal life ==
Jennifer Lartey is married to Steve Lartey, a Ghanaian businessman who was previously an executive at one of Ghana's first financial firms. Together, they have three children. She also has a grandson.
