= Eustache de la Fosse =

Tassin or Eustache de la Fosse (also spelled Delafosse) (ca. 1451 - 23 April 1523) was a Flemish sailor and merchant from Tournai. In 1479-80, he traveled with Castilian sailors from Palos to the Gold Coast in West Africa. However, near São Jorge da Mina, he was captured by Portuguese forces who claimed a Portuguese monopoly on trade in the region. De la Fosse was shipped to Portugal alongside the other merchants and was sentenced to death, but managed to escape.

After returning to Flanders, De la Fosse set down the story of his travels in a manuscript. A copy of this work, dated 1548, has survived at the Valenciennes Library. It is an important primary source for Africanists studying this era.
