= Apewosika (Central Region) =

Community in Central Region, Ghana

- Town
- Country: Ghana
- Region: Central Region
- District: Cape Coast Municipality

Population
  - Total: 673
- Time zone: GMT
  - Summer (DST): GMT

Apewosika is a suburb of Cape Coast and a community in the Cape Coast Municipality in the Central Region of Ghana.

== History ==
Apewosika is said to be about 200 years old. In 1970, the community had a population of about 673 people.

== Facilities ==
- Apewosika University Hospital
- Apewosika Municipal Assembly JHS

== Notable native ==
- Kwamena Minta Nyarku
