= Angela Dwamena-Aboagye =

Ghanaian lawyer and gender activist

- Born: April 1965 (age 61)
- Education: University of Ghana, Georgetown university
- Occupations: Lawyer, Gender Activist

Angela Dwamena-Aboagye (born in 1965) is a Ghanaian lawyer, gender activist, and the Executive Director of The Ark Foundation Ghana. The Ark Foundation is an NGO that seeks to address women’s human rights in Ghana. Dwamena-Aboagye established the first shelter for battered women in Ghana and also set up a crisis centre, with a legal centre and a counselling centre to render sexual and gender based violence and child abuse services in different locations in Ghana, she is also a counsellor, and a motivational public speaker.

== Early life ==
Angela Dwamena-Aboagye (née Sakyi) was born in 1965.

== Education ==
Dwamena-Aboagye attended the Mfantsiman Secondary School and also Holy Child School. She graduated from the University of Ghana and holds a Bachelor of Laws degree, and also a Qualifying Certificate of Law as a Barrister from the Ghana Law School.

Dwamena-Aboagye also obtained a master's degree in law from the Georgetown University Law Center, Washington, D.C., US and also a Master of Arts Degree in Theology from the Akrofi-Christaller Institute, Akropong Ghana. She was called to the Ghana Bar as a Barrister and Solicitor in 1989.

== Personal life ==
She is married to Kwame Dwamena-Aboagye. He also works as a consultant for the Foundation, and they have four children.

== Career ==
She is an adjunct lecturer in gender and the law in the Faculty of Law, University of Ghana; and also a consultant and trainer on gender and women’s human rights. She also worked with the Ministry of Justice and Attorney-General’s Department from 1990 to 1999 but resigned to found The Ark Foundation Ghana.

== Awards and recognition ==
- Dwamena-Aboagye received the Ghana National Commission on Children/UNICEF National Media Features Award on Children in 1996. She was also the recipient of the Unilever Ghana Award for Distinguished Service for the development of women and children in Ghana in 2005.
- African Women’s Development Fund Women of Substance Award for 13 Distinguished African Women (2005).
- The United States of America Embassy 2nd Annual Martin Luther King Jr. Award for Peace and Social Justice in 2009.
- Millennium Excellence Awards (2010) for Women’s Empowerment by the Millennium Excellence Foundation (2010).
- She is also a recipient of the First African Servant Leadership National Awards for Women’s Empowerment in 2011.
