= Mfantsiman Girls' Senior High School =

Girls' secondary school in Mfantsiman, Ghana

Location
- Saltpond; Central Region; Mfantsiman, Ghana; Ghana; 5°44′40″N 0°44′04″W

Information
- Former name: Saltpond Girls' Secondary School Mfantsiman Girls' Secondary School
- School type: All Girls School
- Motto: “ɔbra nye woara bɔ” (life is what you make it)
- Established: 1960
- Founder: Kwame Nkrumah
- School district: Mfantsiman Municipal District
- Oversight: Ministry of Education
- Headmistress: Mad. Roseline Ayorkor Sowah
- Gender: Girls
- Classes offered: Home Economics, General Science, General Arts, Visual Arts, Business Accounting, Agricultural Science
- Language: English
- Website: mfantsimangirls.online

Mfantsiman Girls' Senior High School is an all-girls second cycle institution in Saltpond in the Central Region of Ghana. The school was founded in 1960 by Kwame Nkrumah, originally under the name Saltpond Girls' Secondary School. The school is also known as 'Syte'.

== History ==
The school was built by Kwame Nkrumah in commemoration of the profound and significant role played by the women of Saltpond in the nation's struggle for independence. Formerly known as Saltpond Girls' School, this institution was founded with the purpose of providing relevant education at the second-cycle level for girls. The aim was to equip them with essential skills that would enable them to harness their potential and contribute productively to society. This initiative aimed to facilitate poverty alleviation, foster socio-economic growth, and contribute to the overall development of the nation.

Mfantsiman Girls Secondary School officially opened on the 30th of September, 1960, as one of the renowned Ghana Education Trust (GET) Schools. It was claimed that the school selected 70 girls from the Common Entrance Examination, who became the first batch of the school with Beatrice Chinery as the first headmistress. The school commenced as a dedicated girls' institution, offering educational pathways that led students through the General Certificate of Education – Ordinary Level (G.C.E. 'O' Level) curriculum. Over time, the institution expanded its offerings to include the School Certificate / General Certificate of Education – Ordinary & Advanced Levels (SSCE/GCE 'O' & 'A' Levels) Examinations, as well as the Senior Secondary School Certificate Examination (SSSCE) and the West African Senior School Certificate Examination (WASSCE).

== Features ==
The school's motto is 'Obra Nye Woara abo' in Twi means 'Life is what you make it'. The colors of the school are mauve and white. The badge of the school has an eagle, a straw basket, the claw of an eagle and a woman sitting on an elephant.

The school's anthem comprised a Latin composition that remains in use as the anthem of KNUST.

== Campus ==
=== Houses ===
In terms of student accommodations, the girls are allocated to seven distinct residences, namely

- Butler House
- Crofie House
- Chinery House
- Engman House
- Scotton House
- Yeboah House.
- Addo House

== Alliance ==
Mfantsiman Girls enjoy a strong partnership with the male students of Adisadel College, collectively referred to as SANTAMOGA.

== Notable alumni ==
=== Politics, government, and public policy ===
- Matilda Amissah-Arthur, former Second lady of Ghana
- Samira Bawumia, Second lady of Ghana
- Ursula Owusu-Ekuful, lawyer, women's rights activist and politician
- Christine Churcher, politician
- Jennifer Lartey, diplomat to the Kingdom of Norway

=== Law ===
- Vida Akoto-Bamfo, justice of the Supreme Court of Ghana (2009 – 2019)
- Angela Dwamena-Aboagye, lawyer, gender activist, and the Executive Director of The Ark Foundation Ghana
- Cynthia Lamptey, Deputy Special Prosecutor (2018–)

=== Journalism ===
- Gifty Anti, journalist and broadcaster
- Caroline Sampson, radio presenter, TV show host, compere and voice over artist
- Sangmorkie Tetteh

=== Arts and entertainment ===
- Nana Ekua Brew-Hammond, novelist, writer short stories and poet
- Nadia Buari, award-winning actress
- Eazzy, singer, rapper, and songwriter
- Anita-Pearl Ankor, painter and muralist
- Yvonne Okoro, award-winning actress
- Shirley Frimpong-Manso, CEO of Sparrow Productions
- Caroline Sampson, radio presenter, TV show host, compere, and voiceover artist
- Caranza Naa Okailey Shooter, Miss Africa, Miss Ghana 2012 and Medical Doctor

=== Education ===
- Aba Bentil Andam, first Ghanaian female physicist and former president of the Ghana Academy of Arts and Sciences
- Nana Klutse, Climatologist
- Beatrice Lokko, headmistress of Accra Academy (1996 - 2005)

== Notable staff ==
- Vida Yeboah, politician, former headmistress
- Christine Churcher, politician, former teacher

== Achievements ==
- Finalist Ghana National Science and Maths Quiz 2016
- Winner of 23rd Annual National Senior High School Debate

== See also ==
- List of senior high schools in Ghana
- Ghana National Science and Maths Quiz
- Adisadel College
