= Kwamena Minta Nyarku =

Ghanaian academic and politician

Hon. Kwamena Minta Nyarku
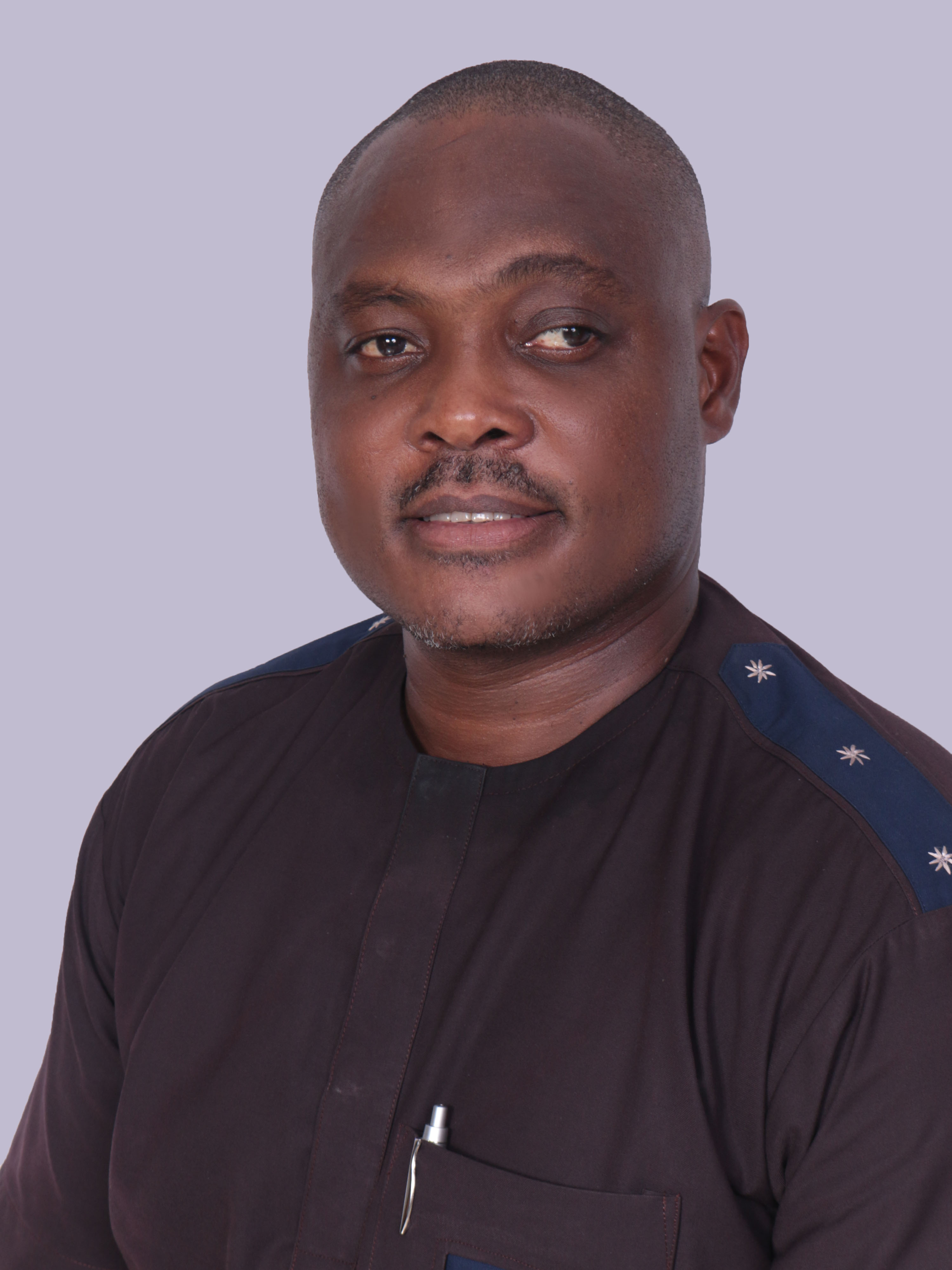

Member of Parliament for Cape Coast North Constituency
- Incumbent
- Assumed office 7 January 2021
- Preceded by: Barbara Asher Ayisi

Personal details
- Born: 7 December 1974 (age 51) Apewosika, Ghana
- Party: National Democratic Congress
- Education: Adisadel College
- Alma mater: Komenda College of Education; University of Cape Coast; University of Ghana Business School; University of Leicester; The Chartered Institute of Marketing
- Occupation: Academic
- Committees: Poverty Reduction Strategy Committee

Kwamena Minta Nyarku (born 7 December 1974) is a Ghanaian academic and politician who is a member of the National Democratic Congress (NDC). He is the member of parliament for the Cape Coast North Constituency in the Central Region of Ghana.

== Early life and education ==
Nyarku was born on 7 December 1974. He hails from Apewosika, Cape Coast in Central Region of Ghana. He completed his GCE Ordinary level and GCE Advanced level certificate in Business in 1992 and 1996 respectively at Adisadel College, Cape Coast. He further moved to the Komenda Training College completing with a Teacher Certificate A (3 year Post Sec Teacher Cert A) in 1995. In 2000, he completed a bachelor's degree in education with emphasis on Business Education at the University of Cape Coast. He went on to the University of Ghana Business School, graduating with a Master of Business Administration (MBA) in Marketing in 2003. He is also a graduate of the University of Leicester, where he completed with a Doctor of Philosophy (PhD) in Marketing in 2019 and the Chartered Institute of Marketing in the United Kingdom.

== Career ==
Nyarku is a Senior Lecturer at the Department of Marketing and Supply Chain Management, School of Business, University of Cape Coast, Ghana.

== Politics ==
=== Parliamentary bid ===
Nyarku stood for the National Democratic Congress' primaries ahead of the 2020 elections. He won the parliamentary bid to represent the National Democratic Congress for the Constituency in August 2019 after he went unopposed due to the disqualification of his two contenders.

On 16 July 2020, ahead of the elections during the compilation of a new voter's register, he was disqualified from holding a voter's ID card due to claims of registering in a suburb of Cape Coast, Nkanfoa, where he had not been a resident for a number of years as required by the registration laws. His eligibility was challenged by a polling agent of his opponent's party the New Patriotic Party (NPP) and referred to the District Registration Review Committee. The District Registration Review Committee upheld the challenge and in August 2020, he filed an appeal against the decision which was dismissed by the Cape Coast High Court. On 22 September 2020, based on points raised by his lawyer Godwin Kudzo Tameklo, an Accra High Court, with the presiding judge Justice Stephen Oppong issued a write of mandamus compelling the Electoral Commission to register him since no court of competent jurisdiction had barred him from registering.

On 1 October 2020, he was registered in accordance to the ruling of the Accra High court. The issuing of the new ID card prompted another challenge by the New Patriotic Party which was this time quashed by the District Registration Review Committee by a 5:2 majority vote paving way for him to file his nomination to contest in the parliamentary elections.

In the 2020 Elections, Nyarku beat the incumbent member of parliament Barbara Asher Ayisi of the New Patriotic Party, who doubled as the deputy minister for works and housing and was a former deputy minister of education. He garnered 22,972 votes against her 21,643 votes representing 51.49% and 48.51% respectively to be declared winner and member of parliament elect.

=== Member of Parliament ===
Nyarku was sworn into office as the Member of Parliament representing the Cape Coast North Constituency in the 8th Parliament of the 4th Republic of Ghana on 7 January 2021. He serves as a member on the Poverty Reduction Strategy Committee.

== Personal life ==
Nyarku is a Christian. He is popularly known referred to by his nickname Ragga.
