= Effutu =

- Village
- Location within Ghana
- Coordinates: 5°12′09″N 1°19′17″W
- Country: Ghana
- Region: Central Region
- District: Effutu Municipal District
- Elevation: 174 ft (53 m)
- Time zone: GMT
  - Summer (DST): GMT

Effutu is a village in Effutu Municipal District in the Central Region of Ghana. The village is known for the Effutu Secondary School. The school is a second cycle institution. It was the capital of the Fetu Kingdom. The Effutu people inhabit Winneba in the Central Region of Ghana and they are part of the original Guan inhabitants of Ghana.
