= Cape Coast Municipal Council =

- Former Municipal Council
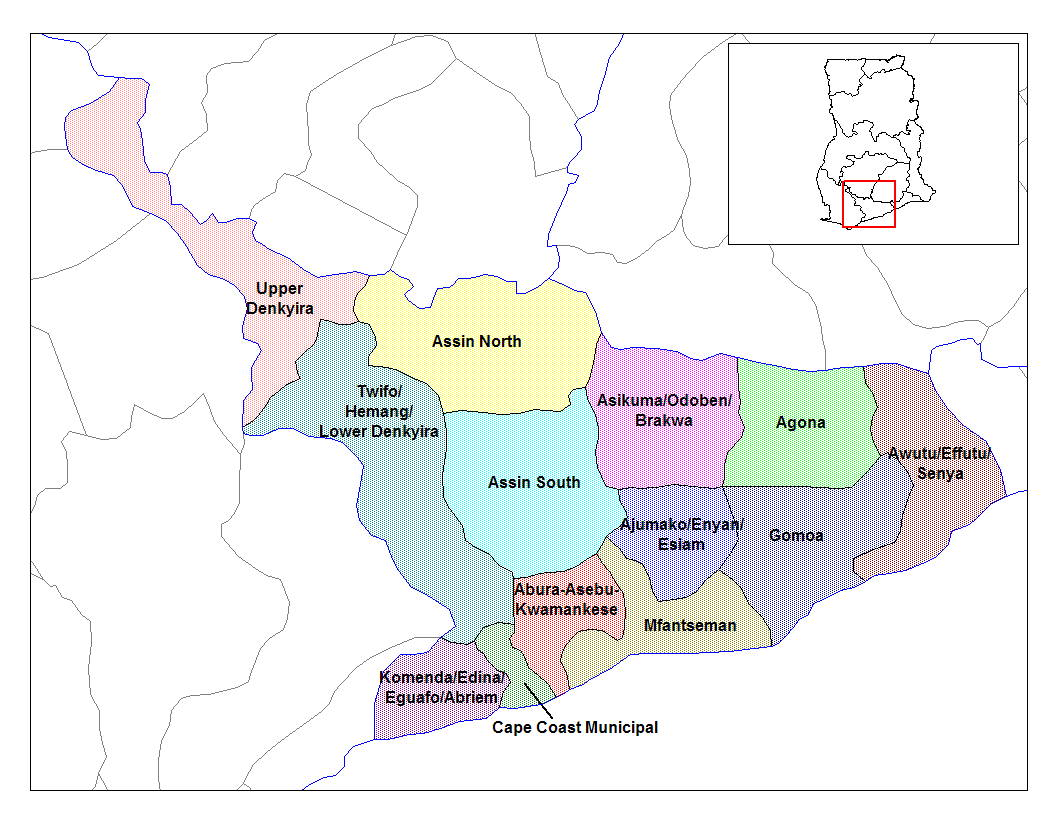
- Districts of Central Region

- Location of Cape Coast Municipal Council within Central
- Coordinates: 5°6′23.4″N 1°14′29.04″W
- Country: Ghana
- Region: Central
- Capital: Cape Coast
- Time zone: UTC+0 (GMT)
- ISO 3166 code: GH-CP-__

Cape Coast Municipal Council is a former district council that was located in Central Region, Ghana. Originally created as a municipal council in 1975. However on 1988, it was split off into two new district assemblies: Cape Coast Municipal District (capital: Cape Coast) and Komenda/Edina/Eguafo/Abirem District (capital: Elmina). The municipal council was located in the southwest part of Central Region and had Cape Coast as its capital town.
