= Kakumdo =

Community in Central Region, Ghana

- Town
- Location of Kakumdo in Central Region, Ghana Kakumdo (Africa)
- Coordinates: 5.1452°N 1.2848°W
- Country: Ghana
- Region: Central Region
- Metropolitan: Cape Coast Metropolis
- Time zone: GMT
  - Summer (DST): GMT

Kakumdo is a community and suburb of Cape Coast in the Cape Coast Metropolis in the Central Region of Ghana. It is one of the host communities of the University of Cape Coast.

== History ==
As at 2015, the Tufohen of Kakumdo is Nana Ekow Nketia II. As at 2015, the Nkosohen of Kakumdo is Mr. Gail Grant, a Swiss philanthropist whose stool name is Nana Tenagyei I.

== Institutions ==
- Kakumdo M/A Basic School
- Wesley Girls' Senior High School

== Notable natives ==
- Most Reverend Mathias Kobina Nketsiah, a Roman Catholic Bishop
