= Battle of Elmina (1625) =

1625 battle

Coordinates: 5.083°N 1.347°W

- Part of the Dutch–Portuguese War
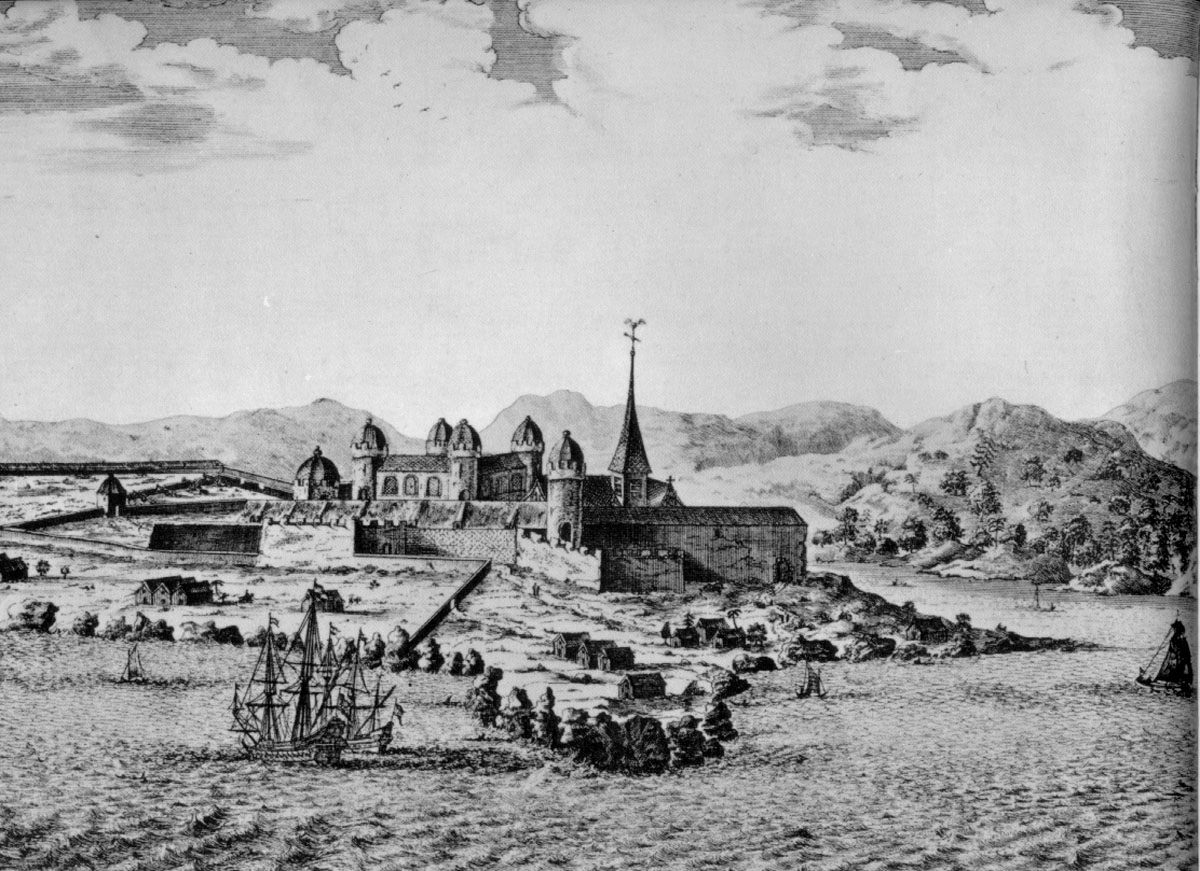
- View of Elmina, 1668.
Date	25 October 1625
Location	Elmina, Portuguese Gold Coast (present-day Ghana)
Result	Portuguese victory

Belligerents
Dutch West India Company	Portugal

Commanders and leaders
(Dutch West India Company) Jan Dircksz Lam †	(Portugal) Fernando de Sottomayor

Strength
1,200 soldiers 15 ships	56 Portuguese; 200 African allies

Casualties and losses
All killed except 45	27 killed

The Battle of Elmina was a military engagement of the Dutch-Portuguese War, fought near the castle of São Jorge da Mina (Elmina Castle) in the Portuguese Gold Coast in 1625. It was fought between 1,200 soldiers of the Dutch West India Company (transported by a fleet of 15 ships) who landed and assaulted the Portuguese garrison of the castle. The garrison was reinforced by 200 African allies put in service of the governor Sottomayor by the local caciques.

The Dutch opened the battle by bombarding the castle. Then the Dutch began to march to the castle, but they were ambushed by the Portuguese and their African allies from hidden positions and were almost totally massacred. Among the dead were the commander-in-chief and all his officers. The Portuguese had very few casualties and took 15 flags, 15 drums, and more than 1,000 muskets, pikes, pistols, and dresses.

The Dutch ships fired over 2,000 cannonballs at the castle before they withdrew.

== See also ==
- Battle of Elmina (1637)
- History of Elmina

== Bibliography ==
- Glete, Jan, Warfare at Sea, 1500-1650: maritime conflicts and the transformation of Europe (2000).
- Rodriguez, Junius P., The Historical Encyclopedia of World Slavery, Volume 1 (1997).
- Boxer, C. R., Fidalgos in the Far East (1948).
- Dei-Anang, Michael, Ghana Resurgent (1964).
- Taylor, Gerard, Capoeira: the Jogo de Angola from Luanda to cyberspace, Volume 1 (2005).
- Graham Dann, A. V. Seatton, Slavery, Contested Heritage, and Thanatourism (2001).
- Johannes Postma, V. Enthoven, Riches from Atlantic Commerce: Dutch transatlantic trade and shipping, 1585-1817 (2003).
- Lewis H. Gann, Peter Duignan, Africa and the World: an introduction to the history of sub-Saharan Africa (1999).
