= Portuguese Gold Coast =

Portuguese colony in west Africa (1482–1642)

Portuguese Gold Coast Costa do Ouro
- 1482–1642
- Flag Coat of arms
- Status: Colony of the Portuguese Empire
- Capital: São Jorge da Mina
- Common languages: Portuguese
- Religion: Roman Catholicism
- Head of state
  - 1482–1495 (first): John II of Portugal
  - 1640–1642 (last): John IV of Portugal
- Captain
  - 1482–1484 (first): Diogo de Azambuja
  - 1642–1642 (last): Francisco de Sotte
- History
  - Established: 21 January 1482
  - Disestablished: 9 January 1642
Succeeded by
Dutch Gold Coast

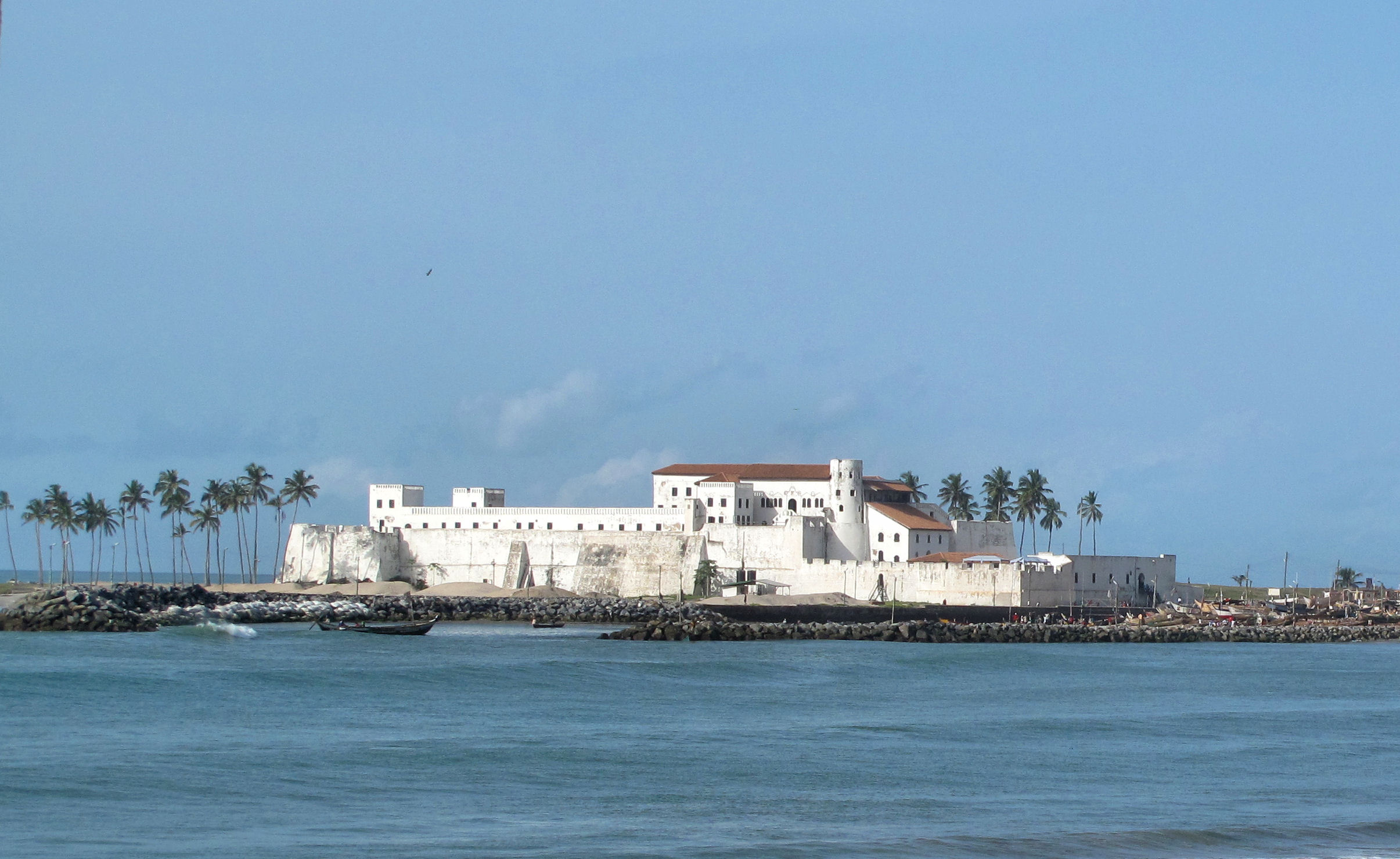
Elmina Castle (São Jorge da Mina): the primary stronghold of the Portuguese in the Gold Coast, situated on a peninsula where the Benya River meets the Gulf of Guinea.

The Portuguese Gold Coast was a Portuguese colony on the West African Gold Coast (present-day Ghana) along the Gulf of Guinea.

From their seat of power at the fortress of São Jorge da Mina (established in 1482 and located in modern Elmina), the Portuguese commanded a vast internal slave trade, creating a slave network that would expand after the end of Portuguese colonialism in the region. The primary export of the colony was gold, which was obtained through barter with the local population. Portuguese presence along the Gold Coast increased seamanship and trade in the Gulf, introduced American crops (such as maize and cassava) into the African agricultural landscape, and made Portuguese an enduring language of trade in the area.

The colony was officially incorporated into Dutch territory in 1642.

== History ==
=== Portuguese arrival on the Gold Coast ===
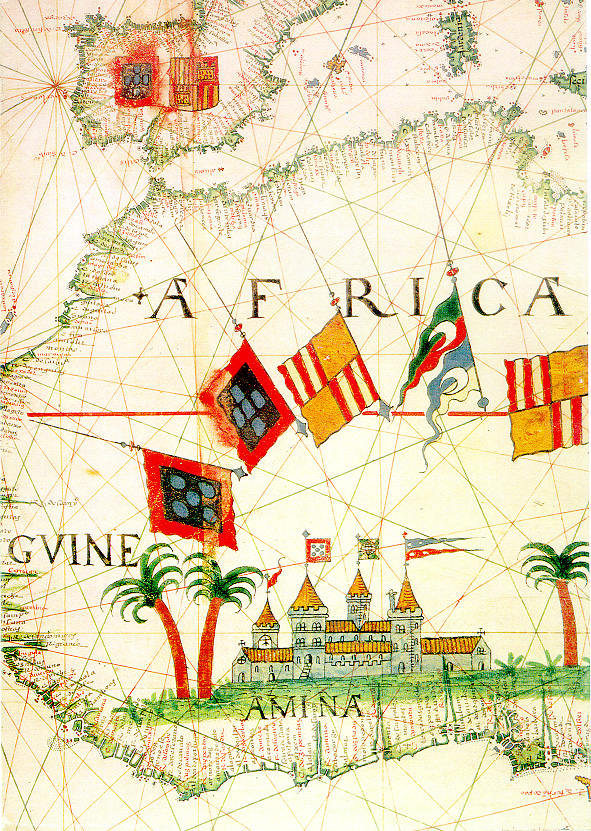
"A Mina", detail from a 16th century map.

In 1471, Portuguese explorers encountered fishing villages rich with ivory and gold along the Atlantic coast of modern-day Ghana, which the Portuguese called the Gold Coast. The prospect of trade in the Gold Coast region helped spur the construction of the fortress São Jorge da Mina (St. George of the Mine) in 1482, which soon came to be known as A Mina Castle (Portuguese "a mina" = "the mine"). The castle was erected near a populated African town which was also called A Mina, which the Dutch would latter adapt to Elmina.

The other major Portuguese settlements on the Gold Coast included the following:

- Fort Santo António de Axim (St. Anthony of Axim), modern Axim: established 1515
- Fort São Francisco Xavier (St. Francis Xavier), modern Osu, a district of Accra: established c.1557—c.1578
- Fort São Sebastião (St. Sebastian), modern Shama: established 1558

The Portuguese decision to construct the fortress at Elmina was influenced by a pre-established trade system between native Elminans and Portuguese merchants in the area. A natural peninsula, enclosed by the Atlantic and the Benya river, was chosen as the site of construction for Elmina Castle to maximize defensibility. A nobleman named Diogo de Azambuja was appointed by the Portuguese king, John II, to construct the coastal fortress. To maintain peace with the native peoples of Elmina, Azambuja entered into negotiations with the native leader Caramansa over their plans to construct Elmina Castle. In a discussion facilitated by a Portuguese merchant and aided by a native translator, Caramansa reacted skeptically to the proposition, as several African homes would have to be destroyed for construction on the castle to begin. After the Portuguese threatened violence, Caramansa met Portuguese demands. However, he prohibited the use of sacred local rock, known to the native Elminans as Kokobo, and forbid the Portuguese from accessing the natives’ freshwater supply. Portuguese settlers, defying Caramansa's demands, mined Kokobo rock for construction purposes. Doing so upset the local population, yet conflict was avoided after the Portuguese bestowed gifts upon the native Elminans. Once constructed, Elmina Castle represented the first major European construction in sub-Saharn Africa and is currently recognized as a UNESCO World Heritage Site.

In order to establish good trade relationships with neighboring African nations, the Portuguese frequently extended gifts to the leaders of interior states, including to the Eguafo state to which Elmina belonged. Their strategy along the coast, however, entailed using force against Africans to prevent them from trading with European competitors. Portuguese violence along the coast soured their relations with neighboring African states; as such, the Portuguese lacked sufficient manpower to enforce their rule across the entire Gulf of Guinea. Portuguese influence along the Gold Coast extended from an area near modern-day New Town, Ghana, in the west to the historic settlement of Adda (near modern-day Denu, Ghana) in the east. Other European nations conducting trade in the Gulf, including the English and Dutch, offered lower-priced commodities than the Portuguese, driving many Africans to accept the risk of Portuguese retaliation in order to yield a larger profit from trade.

=== Dutch competition ===
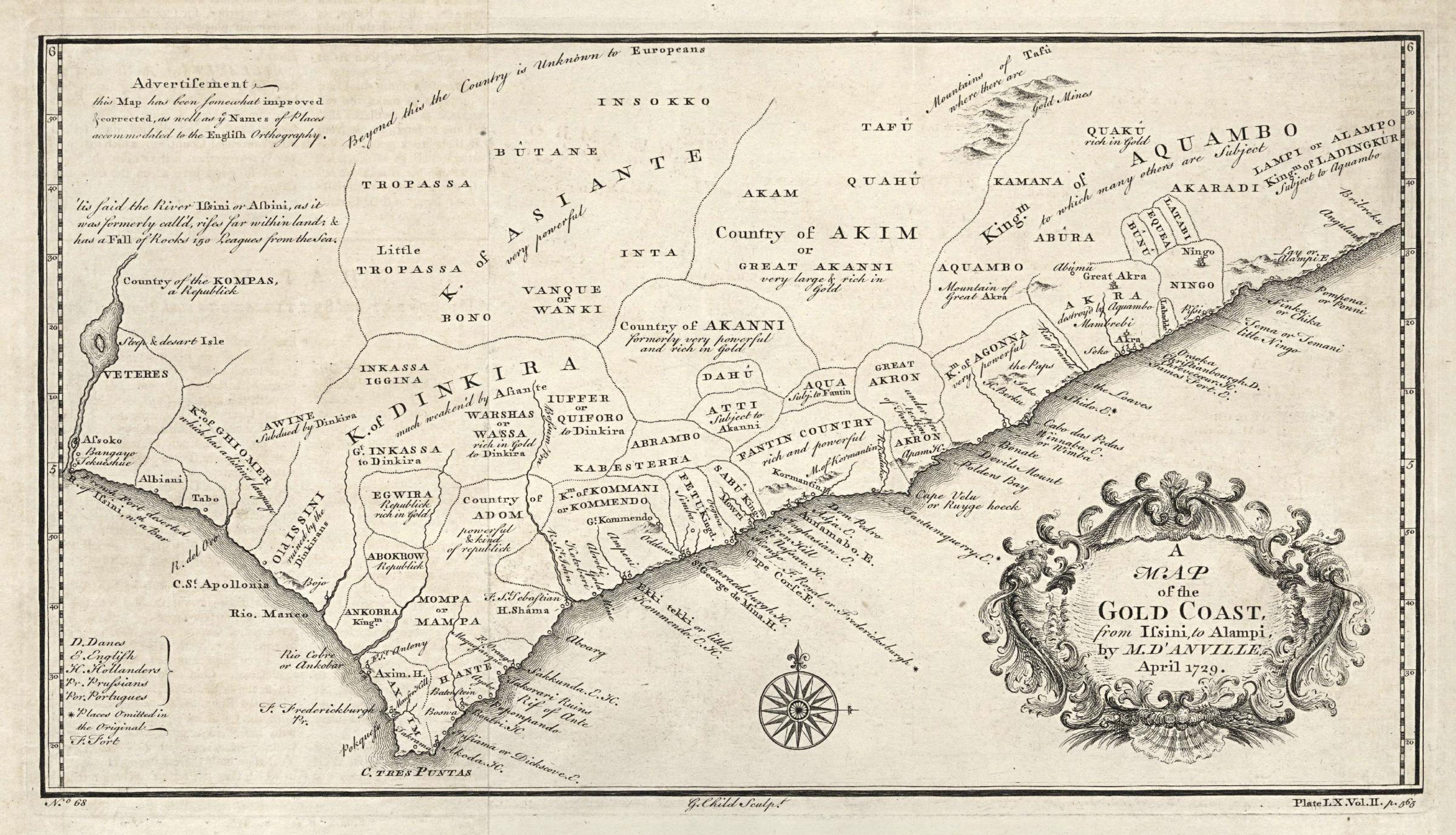
Map of the Gold Coast c.1729.

Competition with European powers coupled with the decline of Portugal’s economic might in the early 1600s led to a waning of Portuguese influence in the Gold Coast region. Spurred by reports of the successful Portuguese gold trade in the Gulf of Guinea, Dutch forces began mobilizing against the Portuguese in an effort to wrest control of the region and monopolize the gold trade. In 1625, the Dutch West India Company initiated an attack on São Jorge da Mina, which stood as the trading hub for the Portuguese in West Africa. The Dutch fleet was made up of the combined forces of Captain Jan Dircksz Lam and the remaining ships from Boudewijn Hendricksz’s failed venture in Salvador against the Spanish. On October 25, 1625, the Dutch were ambushed by Portuguese forces and their African allies, which were persuaded to join the fight after the Portuguese promised them compensation. After incurring heavy losses, the Dutch were expelled from the area in what became known as the Battle of Elmina (1625).

In August of 1637, the Dutch West India Company again targeted Elmina, which they saw as both the seat of Portuguese power in the Gulf of Guinea and a potential foothold into the African slave trade. To aid in the conflict, known as the second Battle of Elmina (1637), the Dutch encouraged members of the Elmina, Komenda, and Efutu states to turn against the Portuguese. After gaining some local support, the Dutch were better equipped to take on the opposing Portuguese forces and succeeded in capturing a hill facing the fort of Elmina. After enduring days of cannon fire, the Portuguese conceded, and Elmina castle officially came under Dutch control on August 29, 1637. Without their stronghold in Elmina, the Portuguese were completely expelled from the region by 1642.

=== Donatary captains ===
Donatary captain (donatário, or Captain-major) was a designation given by the Portuguese Crown to an official tasked with overseeing colonial territory.

List of known donatary captains of the Portuguese Gold Coast (1482-1689)
Duration of Term	Donatary Captain
1482 —1485	Diogo de Azambuja
1485 —1486	Álvaro Vaz Pestana
c.mid-1480s — n.d	Álvaro Mascarenhas
c.1487 — n.d	João Fogaça
1495 — 1499	Lopo Soares de Albergaria
c.1499 — c.1503	Fernão Lopes Correia
c.1503 — c.1506	Diogo Lopes de Sequeira
c.1506 — c.1509	António de Bobadilha
c.1510 — n.d	Manuel de Góis
1513 — n.d	Afonso Caldeira
c.1513 — n.d	António Fróis
1514 — c.1516	Nuno Vaz de Castelo Branco
c.1516 — 1519	Fernão Lopes Correia
1519 — 1522	Duarte Pacheco Pereira
1522 — 1524	Afonso de Albuquerque
1524 — 1525	João de Barros
1526 — 1529	João Vaz de Almada
1529 — 1532	Estêvão da Gama
1536 — 1537	Manuel de Albuquerque
1537 — c.1540	unknown
1540 — 1543	António de Miranda de Azevedo
1541 — c.1545	Lopo de Sousa Coutinho
1545 — n.d	Diogo Soares de Albergaria
1545 — 1548	António de Brito
1548 — 1550	Lopo de Sousa Coutinho
c.1550 — n.d	Martim de Castro
c.1550 — c.1552	Diogo Soares de Albergaria
c.1552 — n.d	Filipe Lobo
c.1552 — c.1556	Rui de Melo
1556 — c.mid-1550s	Afonso Gonçalves de Botafogo
c.mid-1550s — 1559	António de Melo
1559 — n.d	Manuel da Fonseca
1559 — 1562	Rui Gomes de Azevedo
1562 — n.d	Manuel de Mesquita Perestrelo
c.1562 — n.d	João Vaz de Almada Falcão
c.mid-1560s — n.d	Francisco de Barros de Paiva
1564 — n.d	Fernando Cardoso
n.d. — 1570	unknown
1570 — 1573	António de Sá
c.1573 — n.d	Martim Afonso
c.1574 — n.d	Mendo da Mota
n.d. — c.1579	unknown
1579 — c.1583	Vasco Fernandes Pimentel
1583 — 1586	João Rodrigues Pessanha
1586 — n.d	Bernardino Ribeiro Pacheco
n.d. — 1586	unknown
1586 —1594	João Roiz Coutinho
c.1595 —c.1596	Duarte Lobo da Gama
1596 — 1608	Cristóvão de Melo
1608 — 1610	Duarte de Lima
1610 — 1613	João de Castro
1613 — 1616	Pedro da Silva
c.1616 — 1624	Manuel da Cunha de Teive
1624 — c.1625	Francisco de Souto-Maior
c.mid-1620s — c.mid-1620s	Luís Tomé de Castro
c.mid-1620s — 1629	João da Serra de Morais
1629 — c.1632	unknown
1632 — 1634	Pedro de Mascarenhas
1634 — 1634	Duarte Borges (acting)
1634 — 1642	André da Rocha de Magalhães
1642 — 1642	Francisco de Sotte

== Economy ==
The Portuguese imported slaves to Elmina throughout the sixteenth century, using them primarily to transport goods to and from interior African states, but also to exchange with local Elminans for gold. The main supply of Gold Coast slaves came from the trade route between Benin and Elmina, which also supplied the Portuguese with important commodities such as cotton, cloth, and beads. The slave trade was later expanded to encompass the Niger River delta and the island of São Tome. Cloth, linens, beads, copper and brass pots, pans, bracelets, and slaves were all used as bartering tools to obtain gold from the native merchants of Elmina. Elmina's gold originated from the Asante and Denkyira regions of modern-day Ghana and became the dominant export from the colony along with, to a lesser extent, ivory. Additionally, the inflow of foreign crops into the Gold Coast region globalized the region's agricultural practices and output, introducing sugar, maize, guava, sweet potatoes, coconut, yams, and cassava to the African agricultural landscape. Further, the dominance of the Portuguese trade route along the Gulf Coast in the sixteenth century led to Portuguese becoming the principal language of exchange in the Gulf of Guinea. The language has endured in the area despite the presence of other European powers in the Gulf after the colony was ceded in 1642.

== Legacy ==
The internal African slave trade established by the Portuguese laid the groundwork for the vast networks of human trafficking that would flourish in the region during the centuries to come, as the Dutch and, later, the British capitalized on pre-established trade routes during the Atlantic slave trade. Further, the shipping might of the Portuguese encouraged new, long-distance river trading amidst West African states, and the volume of trade along the Gulf of Guinea increased as a result of Portuguese presence. Boatbuilding became an important craft that accompanied an increase in coastal trade and seamanship in the Gulf. After generations of intimate contact with local African dialects, Portuguese creole emerged as an important language of trade along the Gulf Coast, second only to Portuguese itself. Further, interbreeding between Portuguese and Africans led to a sizable mixed-race population along the Gold Coast.

Urbanization occurred around Elmina, spurred partly by Portuguese attempts to establish a municipality in the area. Native governors, known as braffos, were given authority by the Portuguese, and migration from the interior to coastal regions increased. The cultivation of maize and cassava, first introduced to the region by the Portuguese through trans-Atlantic trade, flourished in the Gold Coast and became dietary staples throughout West Africa. Further, Portuguese contact and activity along the Gold Coast integrated the region into the global economy. The larger trade volume in the region centralized the small, distinct states that existed prior to Portuguese contact into larger political entities. The advent of global trade in the Gold Coast also consolidated commercial activity in coastal cities, which connected inland African communities with European trade.
