= Cape Coast North (Ghana parliament constituency) =

Constituency in the Central Region of Ghana

- constituency for the Parliament of Ghana
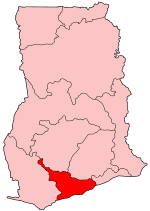
- District: Cape Coast Metropolitan Assembly
- Region: Central Region of Ghana

Current constituency
- Party: National Democratic Congress
- MP: Kwamena Minta Nyarku

Cape Coast North is one of the constituencies represented in the Parliament of Ghana. It elects one Member of Parliament (MP) by the first past the post system of election. The Cape Coast North constituency is located in the Cape Coast Metropolitan District of the Central Region of Ghana.

== Boundaries ==
The seat is located entirely within the Cape Coast Metropolitan district of the Central Region of Ghana.

== Members of Parliament ==
Election	Member	Party
2008	Ebo Barton-Oduro	National Democratic Congress
2012	Ebo Barton-Oduro	National Democratic Congress
2016	Barbara Asher Ayisi	New Patriotic Party
2021	Kwamena Minta Nyarku	National Democratic Congress

== Elections ==
Dr. Kwamena Mintah Nyarku the current MP for the Cape Coast North constituency.

== See also ==
- List of Ghana Parliament Constituencies
- Cape Coast Municipal district
