= Battle of Elmina (1637) =

1637 during the Dutch-Portuguese War

Coordinates: 5.0824°N 1.3475°W

- Part of Dutch–Portuguese War
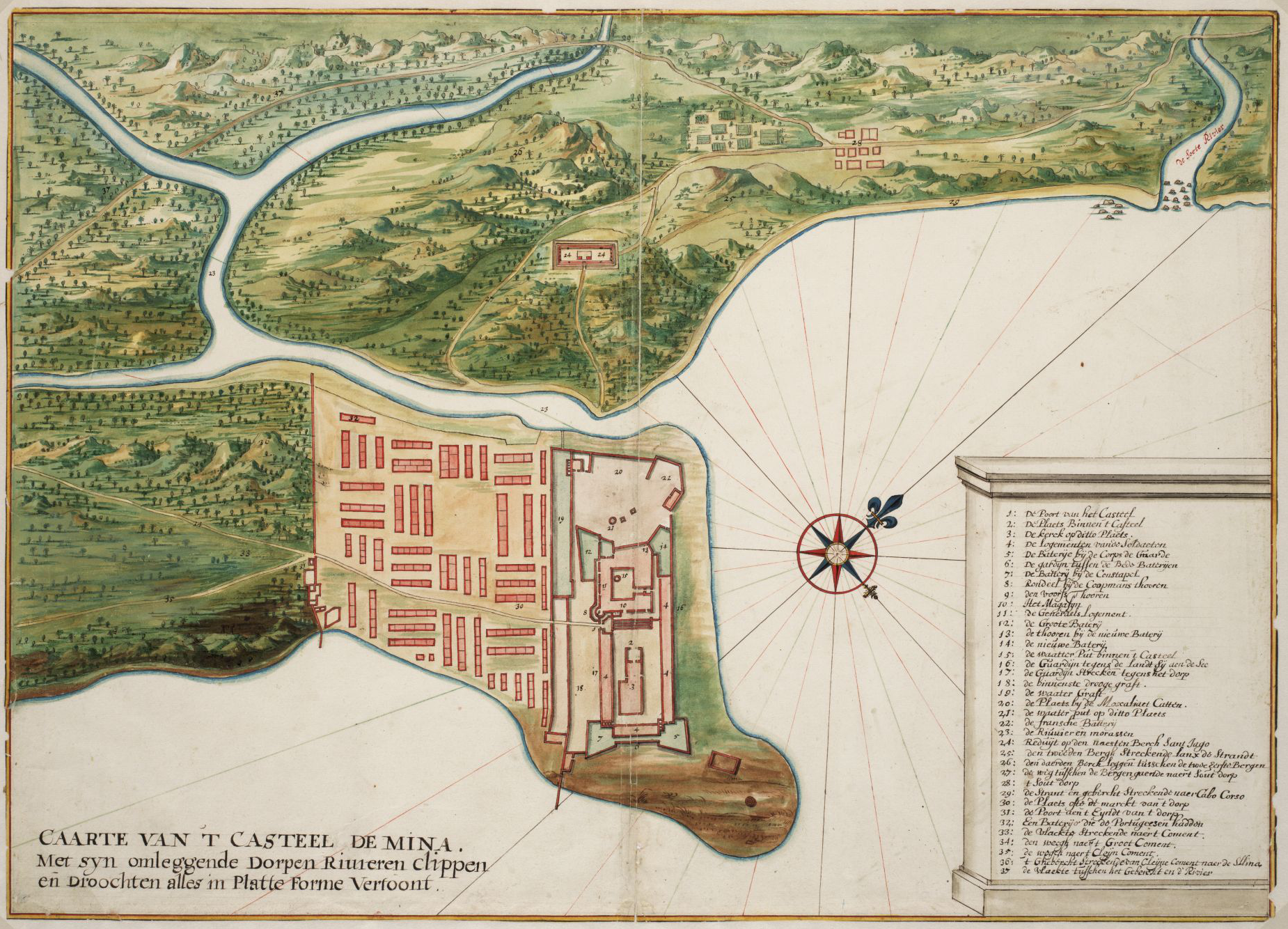
- A map of Elmina
Date	24–29 August 1637
Location	Elmina, Ghana
Result	Dutch victory

Belligerents
Dutch West India Company	(Portugal) Portuguese Empire

Commanders and leaders
(Dutch West India Company) Hans Coine	Unknown

Strength
9 ships 500 seamen 800 soldiers	30 soldiers 1,000 native allies

The Battle of Elmina in 1637 was a military engagement between the Portuguese and the Dutch that culminated with the capture of the historical St. George of Elmina Fort by the latter.

In 1637, the Dutch West India Company detached nine ships from the forces attacking the Portuguese in Brazil to send them against the Portuguese in Fort Elmina. They appointed Colonel Hans Coine to command the fleet which consisted of a total of 1,300 men. They landed on 24 July, a short distance away from Cape Coast, and proceeded by canoe down the Sweet River towards the Portuguese fort, bringing 800 soldiers and three days worth of provisions.

A hill named St. Jago dominated the fort which Coine determined needed be taken if they were to take the fort. However, 1,000 natives allied to the Portuguese were at the base of it, preventing the Dutch from seizing it. Coine sent four companies of fusiliers after it, but they were annihilated. A second Dutch detachment that attacked the other side fared better, causing the natives to rout. The Portuguese and their native allies made two attempts to take back the position, but both failed. After the second failed attack, the Portuguese fell back into their redoubt at the summit of the hill.

The redoubt was protected by a wooden wall on one side, and a river on the other. Coine decided to ford the river to allow a mortar and two cannon to fire upon the fort. After bombarding the fort for two days, he demanded the surrender of the garrison. The Portuguese governor requested a three-day truce, but Coine refused as he only had provisions for one more day. He brought more of his forces to St. Jago and continued to bombard the fort. The bombardment was ineffective, and by the next morning Coine realized that he would either have to attack the fort that very day or abandon the attempt. He dispatched a group of grenadiers up the hill, but before they could attack a chamade was sounded and two messengers were sent out by the Portuguese to negotiate a surrender.

The surrender allowed the governor, the garrison and all Portuguese citizens to leave, without swords or any other weapons, on a boat to the island of São Tomé. The Dutch would be allowed take all that was left including gold, silver and slaves.

== See also ==
- Battle of Elmina (1625)
- Battle of Elmina (1781)
- History of Elmina

== Sources ==
- Ellis, Alfred Burdon (1893). History of the Gold Coast of West Africa.
- Universal History. Vol. 17. London. 1760.
