= Christine Churcher =

Ghanaian politician

Hon. Christine Churcher

Member of Parliament for Cape Coast Constituency
- In office 7 January 2005 – 6 January 2009
- President: John Kufuor
- Succeeded by: Ebo Barton-Odro

Member of Parliament for Cape Coast Constituency
- In office 7 January 2001 – 6 January 2005
- President: John Kufuor

Personal details
- Born: 21 September 1954 (age 71)
- Party: New Patriotic Party
- Education: University of Ghana
- Profession: Politician

Christine Churcher (born 21 September 1954) is a politician in Ghana. She was the member of parliament for the Cape Coast constituency in the Central Region of Ghana in the 2nd, 3rd, 4th and 5th parliament of the Republic of Ghana.

== Early life and education ==
Churcher was born on 21 September 1954. She attended the Kwesi Plange Primary School also known as Pere Planque Memorial Preparatory School in Cape Coast from 1959 to 1965. Between 1965 and 1972 she attended the Mfanstiman Girls Secondary School. Between 1975 and 1978 Churcher studied English and history at the University of Ghana and graduated successfully. Later, Churcher obtained the Master in Philosophy in adult education at the University of Ghana.

== Career ==
Churcher is a Ghanaian politician. She has held a variety of state ministerial positions in Ghana. She has worked as a former Minister of Environment and Science. She has also served on the Board of Directors of Ghana Gas Company. She has also served as a Minister of State for Education.

== Politics ==
Churcher has represented the Cape Coast constituency in the Central region of Ghana in the 2nd, 3rd and 4th parliaments of the 4th republic of Ghana.

=== Elections ===
Churcher was first elected into Parliament on the ticket of the New Patriotic Party during the December 1996 Ghanaian General Elections for the Cape Coast Constituency in the Central Region of Ghana. She polled 30,496 votes out of the 56,428 valid votes cast representing 46.20%over her opponent S.Valis-Akyianu an NDC member who also polled 25,932 votes.

Churcher was elected as the member of the 3rd parliament of the 4th republic of Ghana in the 2000 Ghanaian general elections for the Cape Coast South Constituency on the ticket of the New Patriotic Party (NPP) with a total number of votes cast of 31,573 votes representing 55.70% over her opponents. She was also elected as the member of parliament for the 4th parliament of the 4th republic of Ghana in the 2004 Ghanaian general elections. She thus served as a member of parliament for the Cape Coast constituency from 7 January 2005 to 6 January 2009. She was elected with 36,264 votes out of 70,866 total valid votes cast. This was equivalent to 51.2% of the total valiv votes cast. She was elected over MacDonald Konns Tongo of the People's National Convention, Ebo Barton-Odro of the National Democratic Congress and Araba Bentsi-Enchill Safohen of the Convention People's Party. These obtained 0.8%, 44.5% and 3.5% respectively of total valid votes cast. Churcher was elected on the ticket of the New Patriotic Party. Her constituency was a part of the 16 constituencies won by the New Patriotic Party in the Central region in that elections. In all, the New Patriotic Party won a total 128 parliamentary seats in the 4th parliament of the 4th republic of Ghana.

=== Ambassadorial appointment ===
In 2021, Churcher was the Ambassador of Ghana to the Republic of Benin.

== See also ==
- List of Ghanaian politicians
