= Chamade =

Form of signal formerly used by military

In war, a chamade was a certain beat of a drum, or sound of a trumpet, which was addressed to the enemy as a kind of signal, to inform them of some proposition to be made to the commander; either to capitulate, to have leave to bury their dead, make a truce, etc. Gilles Ménage derives the word from the Italian chiamate, from Latin clamare, to call.

Marin Mersenne recorded both a chamade drum pattern, and a chamade cavalry trumpet signal in his annotated copy of the Harmonie universelle.

The word was taken from French into German from the late seventeenth century in the military phrase die Chamade schlagen, meaning 'to surrender', and became a geflügeltes Wort in the late nineteenth century.

== See also ==
- White flag
