= TV Africa =

tv africa
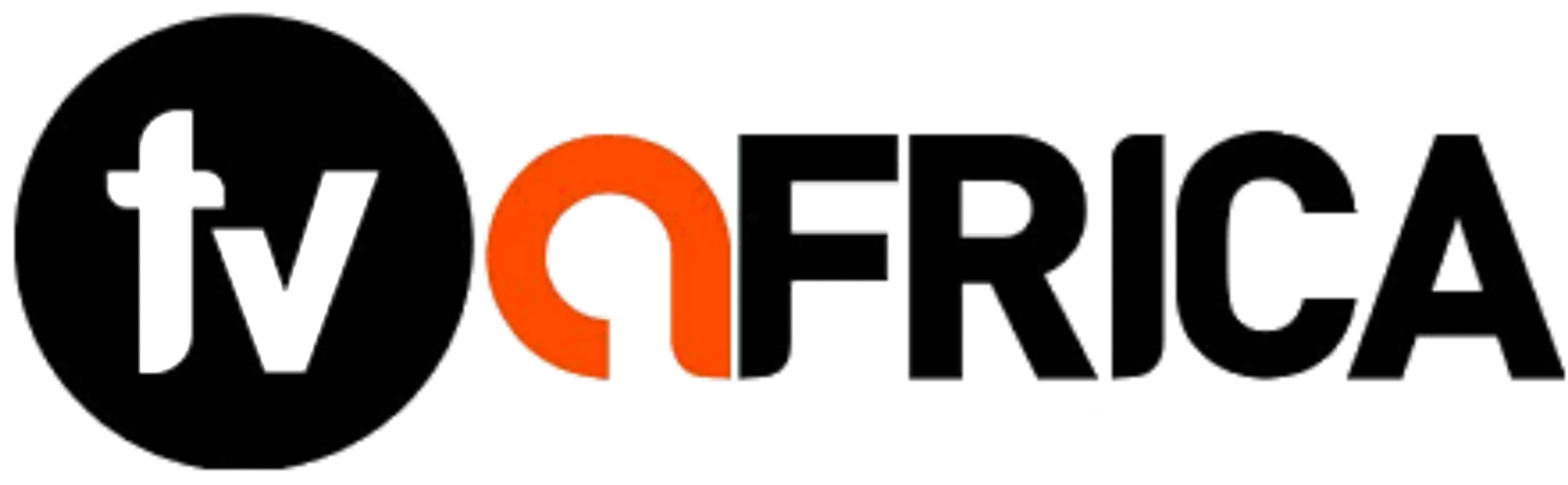
- Country: Ghana
- Headquarters: Accra

Programming
- Languages: Ga, Twi, British English

History
- Launched: 17 May 2003

TV Africa is the first private fully owned Ghanaian free to air television station that has been consistent and has a credible brand for over 20 years. The station has been positioned to be the voice of Africa and the go-to station for authentic Africa news with a strong production of In-House TV programming and the best in-house TV studios (5 large and infrastructure fit studios).

== History ==
The station was founded by filmmaker Kwaw Ansah in June 1999.

The station started test broadcasts in 2002 and was formally inaugurated by the President of Ghana John Kufuor on 17 May 2003.

The channel was acquired by Groupe Ideal in November 2016. The new management unveiled new programming in February 2018: Breakfastlive, G-Zone, Temperature, Video Ryde, Paemuka, Odoconfession, Newshour and Goal and Sportsworld.
