= Cape Coast Metropolitan Assembly =

Metropolitan District in Central Region, Ghana

Cape Coast Metropolitan District
- Metropolitan District
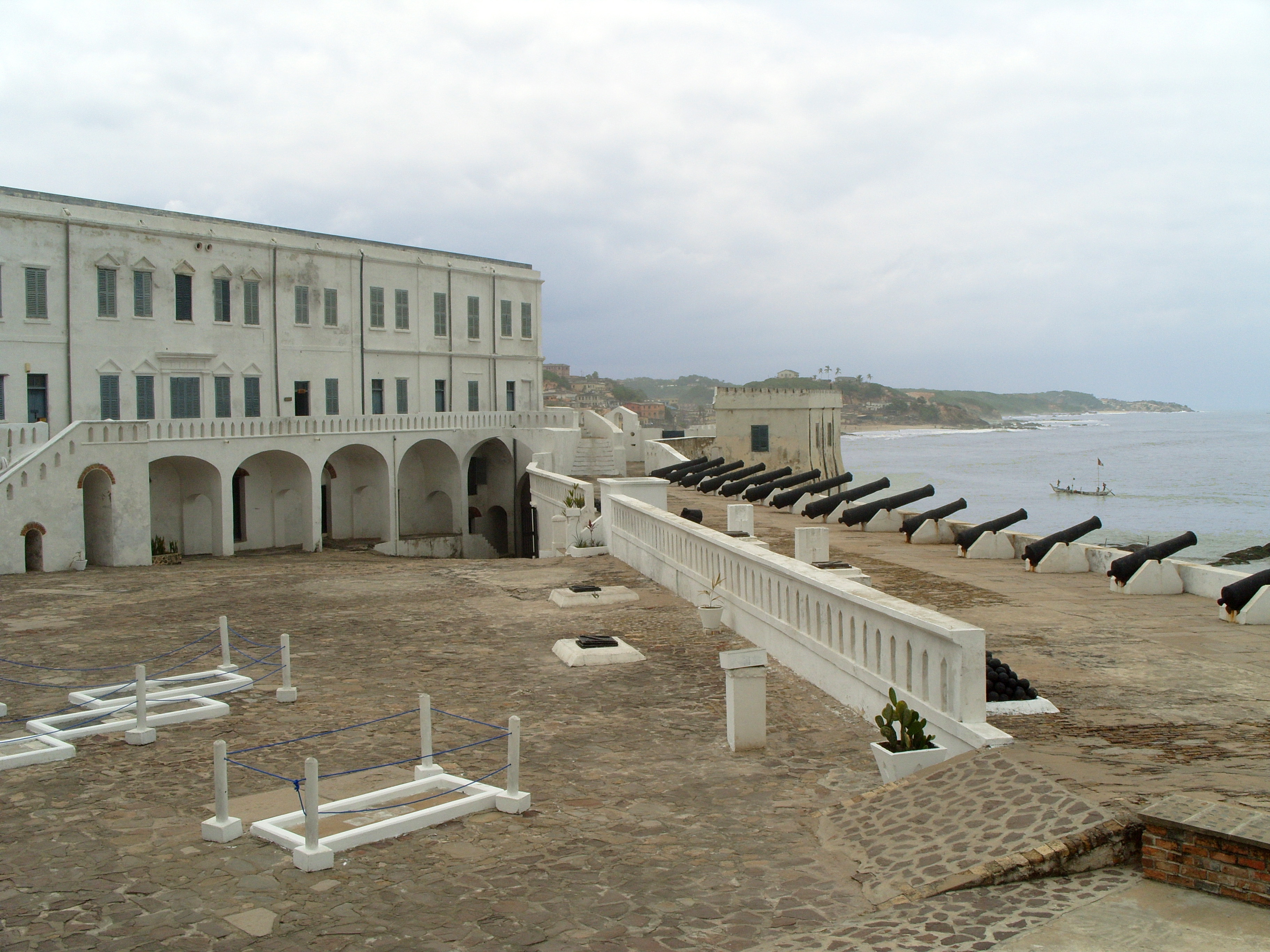
- Center of the Cape Coast Castle

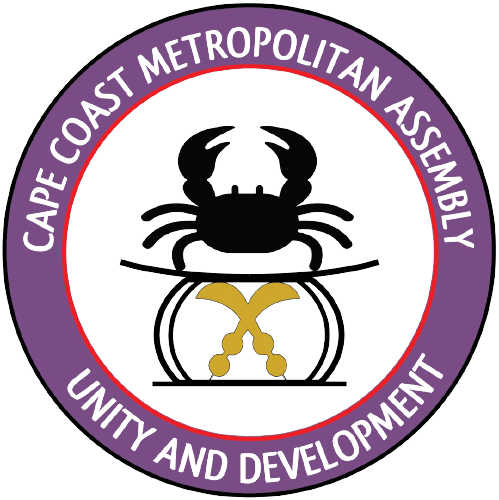
- Seal

- Districts of Central Region

- Location of Cape Coast Metropolitan District within Central
- Coordinates: 5°6′23.4″N 1°14′29.04″W
- Country: Ghana
- Region: Central
- Capital: Cape Coast

Government
  - Metropolitan Chief Executive: Anthony Egyir Aikins

Population (2021)
  - Total: 189,925
- Time zone: UTC+0 (GMT)
- ISO 3166 code: GH-CP-CC
- Website: Official Website

Cape Coast Metropolitan Assembly is one of the twenty-two districts in Central Region, Ghana. Originally created as a municipal district assembly in 1988 when it was known as Cape Coast Municipal District, which was created from the Cape Coast Municipal Council; until it was later elevated to metropolitan district assembly status on 29 February 2008 to become Cape Coast Metropolitan District. The municipality is located in the southwest part of Central Region and has Cape Coast as its capital town; which is also the regional capital of the Central Region.

== Geography ==
=== Boundaries ===
Cape Coast Metropolitan Assembly is bordered by the Gulf of Guinea to the south, Komenda/Edina/Eguafo/Abirem Municipal District to the west, Abura/Asebu/Kwamankese District to the east and Twifo/Heman/Lower Denkyira District to the north.

== List of settlements ==
Settlements of Cape Coast Metropolitan Assembly
No.	Settlement	Population	Population year
1	Abura		
2	Akotokyire		
3	Amamoma		
4	Amisano		
5	Ankaful		
6	Anto Essuekyir		
7	Cape Coast	227,269	2013
8	Cape Vars		
9	Duakor		
10	Effutu		
11	Ekon		
12	Kakumdo		
13	Koforidua		
14	Kokoado		
15	Mpeasem		
16	Nkanfoa		
17	Nyinasin		
18	Ola		
19	Pedu		
20	Brabedzi		
21	Kwesi Prah		
22	Apewosika		

== Sources ==
- "Cape Coast Metropolitan Assembly". Statoids.
- Districts: Cape Coast Metropolitan Assembly
