= Komenda/Edina/Eguafo/Abirem Municipal District =

- Municipal District
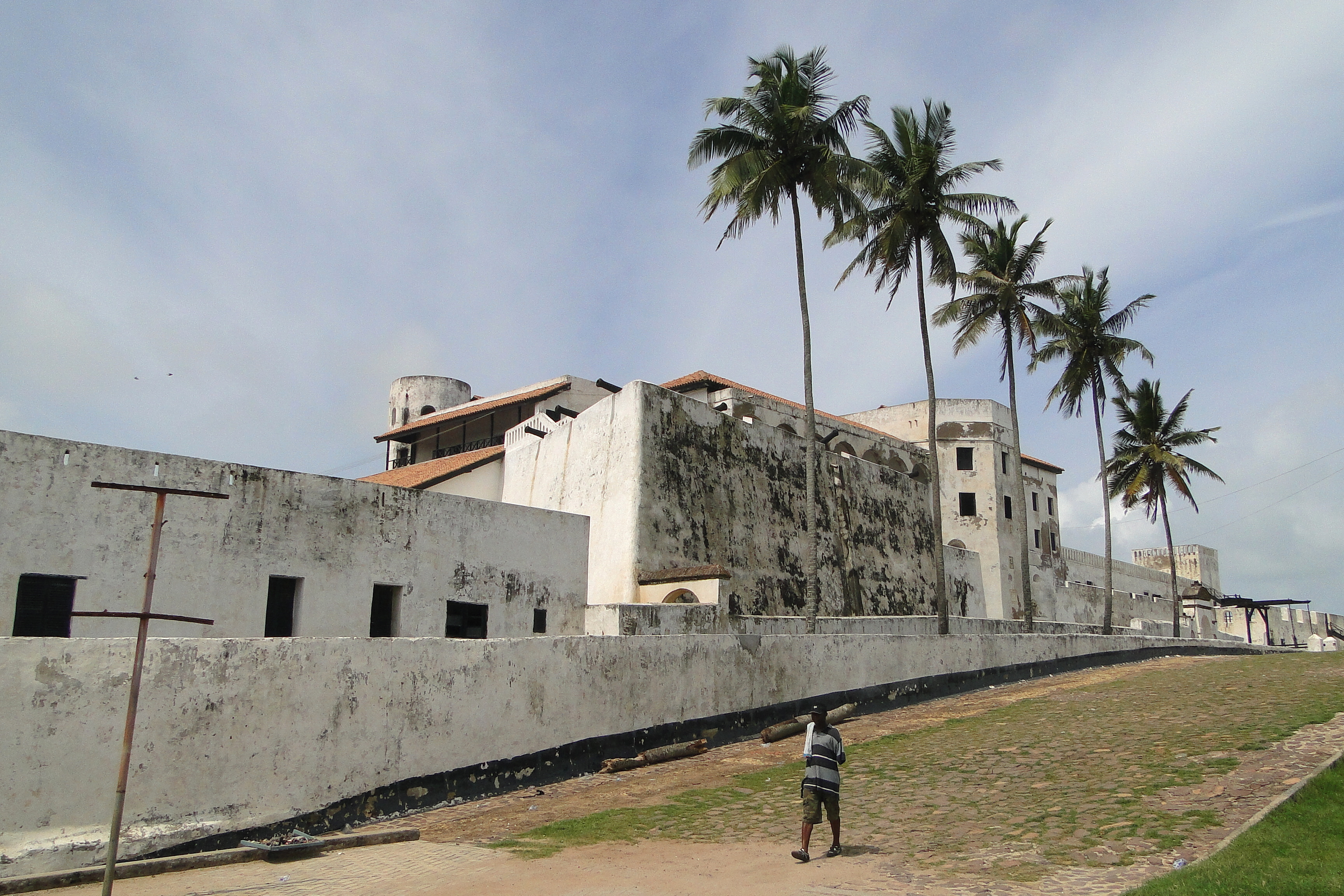
- Elmina Castle

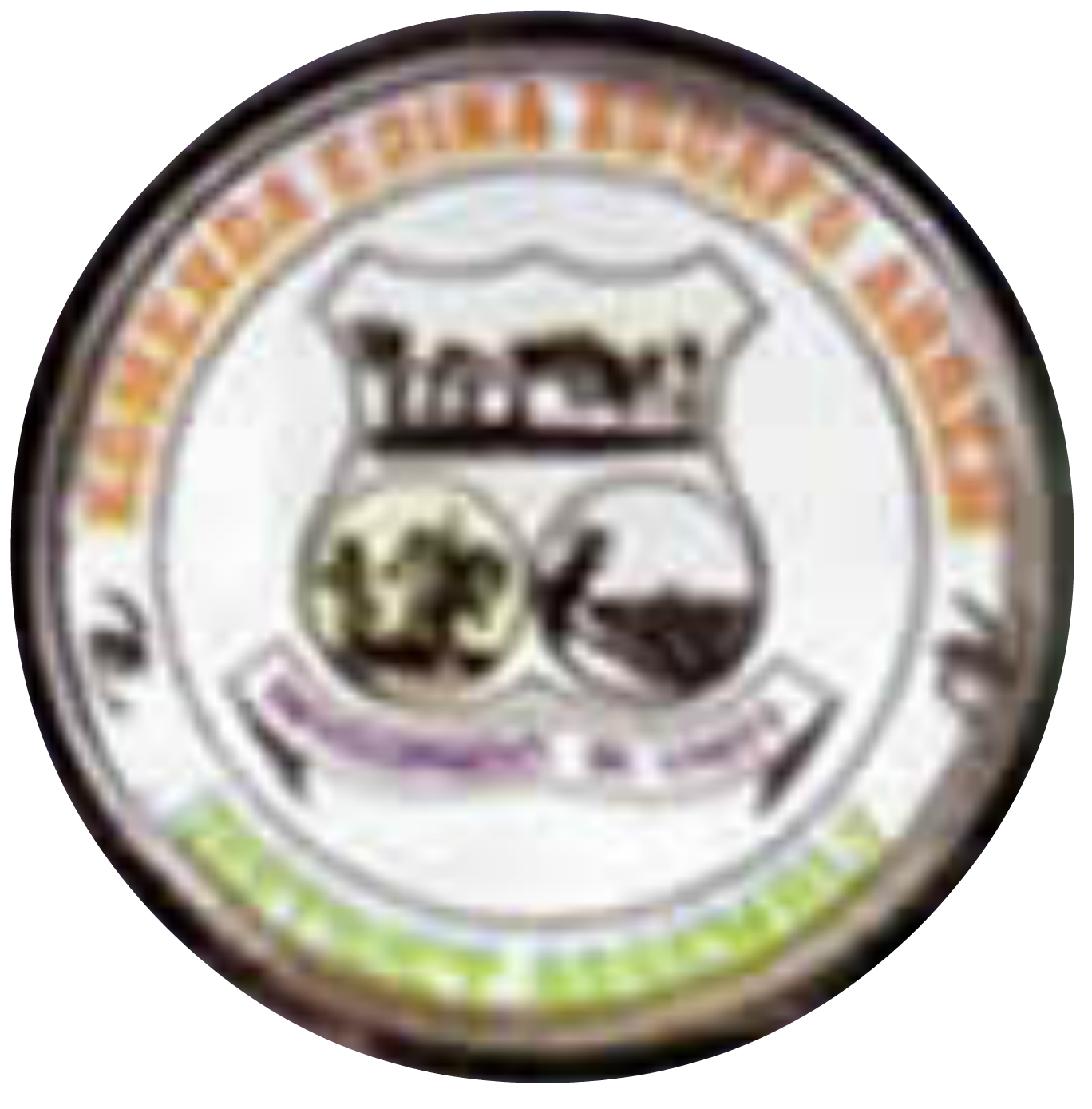
- Seal

- Districts of Central Region

- Location of Komenda/Edina/Eguafo/Abirem Municipal District within Central
- Coordinates: 5°5′24.72″N 1°20′57.12″W
- Country: Ghana
- Region: Central
- Capital: Elmina

Government
  - Municipal Chief Executive: George Frank Asmah

Area
  - Total: 396 km^{2} (153 sq mi)

Population (2021)
  - Total: 166,017
- Time zone: UTC+0 (GMT)
- ISO 3166 code: GH-CP-KE
- Website: Official Website

Komenda/Edina/Eguafo/Abirem Municipal District is one of the twenty-two districts in the Central Region of Ghana. Originally created as an ordinary district assembly in 1988, when it was known as Komenda/Edina/Eguafo/Abirem District, it was created from the Cape Coast Municipal Council, until it was later elevated to municipal district assembly status on 29 February 2008, to become Komenda/Edina/Eguafo/Abirem Municipal District. The municipality is located in the southwest part of Central Region and has Elmina as its capital town.

== List of settlements ==
Settlements of Komenda/Edina/Eguafo/Abirem Municipal District
No.	Settlement	Population	Population year
1	Abeyee		
2	Aboransa		
3	Aborodeano		
4	Abrem Agona	Abrem Ankaase	
5	Abrem Berase		
6	Abreshia (Abrehya)		
7	Amisano		
8	Ampenyi		
9	Bantoma		
10	Besease		
11	Bronyibima		
12	Domenase		
13	Dutch Komenda		
14	Eguafo		
15	Elmina	32,819	2012
16	Essaman Junction		
17	Kissi		
18	Komenda		
19	Ntranoa		

== Sources ==
- "Komenda/Edina/Eguafo/Abirem Municipal District". Statoids.
- District: Komenda/Edina/Eguafo/Abirem Municipal District
