= Ben Crack-O =

Liberian tribal king

Ben Crack-O (d. December 14, 1842) was a king of the Crack-O tribe in the region around Cape Palmas, in the present day border area of Liberia and the Ivory Coast, in the 1840s. He was killed by men under Commodore Matthew C. Perry during the Ivory Coast Expedition.

== Crack-O tribe ==
King Crack-O ruled over the Crack-O tribe, who were an inland people that desiring to engage in foreign trade fought against the Bassa Cove and Berribee people and established ten miles of coast on which they built five towns.

== Battle of Little Bereby ==
Commodore Perry, Liberian Governor Joseph Jenkins Roberts, and King Crack-O agreed to hold a palaver at King Crack-O's capital of Little Berribee to discuss alleged piracy by King Crack-O against American shipping. During the meeting held on December 13, King Crack-O through an interpreter denied any involvement in piracy against the American schooner Mary Carver, which had been plundered earlier in the year in the vicinity. The American officers and Roberts felt the interpreter was an "unskillful liar". Commodore Perry stood up and denounced the interpreter as a liar before moving to confront King Crack-O. A scuffle ensued and the US sergeant of the marines shot and wounded King Crack-O while two other marines bayoneted him. The gathering broke down into a melee with King Crack-O's men running in all directions. His interpreter was shot dead while trying to run away. Commodore Perry ordered the town to be burned. The American sailors "gave three cheers and then applied the torch" and in 15 minutes the whole town was set on fire.

King Crack-O was taken prisoner by the Americans and died from his wounds the next morning.
