= Punitive expedition =

Military journey undertaken to punish a state

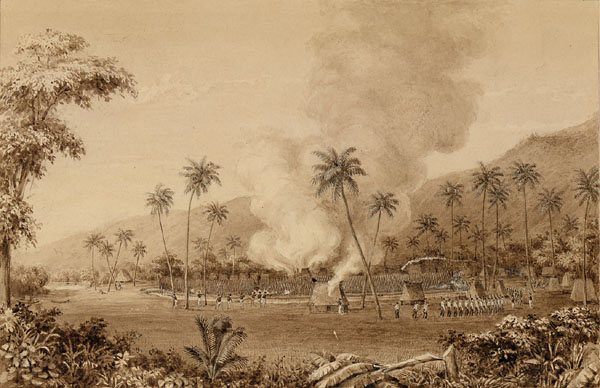
The American punitive expedition against Malolo, Fiji in 1840 by Alfred Agate

A punitive expedition is a military journey undertaken to punish a political entity or any group of people outside the borders of the punishing state or union. It is usually undertaken in response to perceived disobedient or morally wrong behavior by miscreants, as revenge or corrective action, or to apply strong diplomatic pressure without a formal declaration of war (e.g. surgical strike). In the 19th century, punitive expeditions were used more commonly as pretexts for colonial adventures that resulted in annexations, regime changes or changes in policies of the affected state to favour one or more colonial powers.

Stowell (1921) provides the following definition:

When the territorial sovereign is too weak or is unwilling to enforce respect for international law, a state which is wronged may find it necessary to invade the territory and to chastise the individuals who violate its rights and threaten its security.

== Historical examples ==
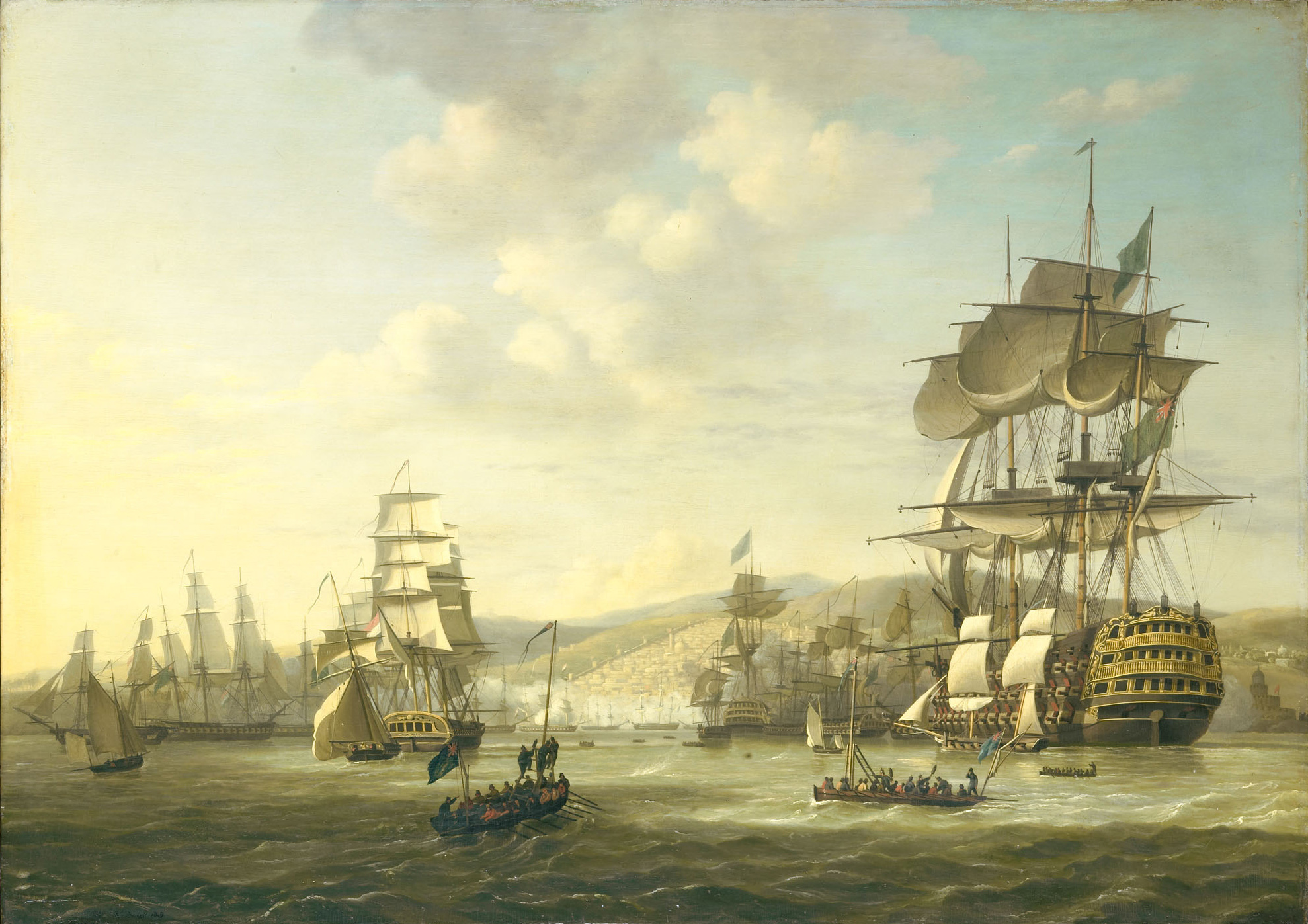
The Bombardment of Algiers by the Anglo–Dutch fleet in 1816 to support the ultimatum to release European slaves.

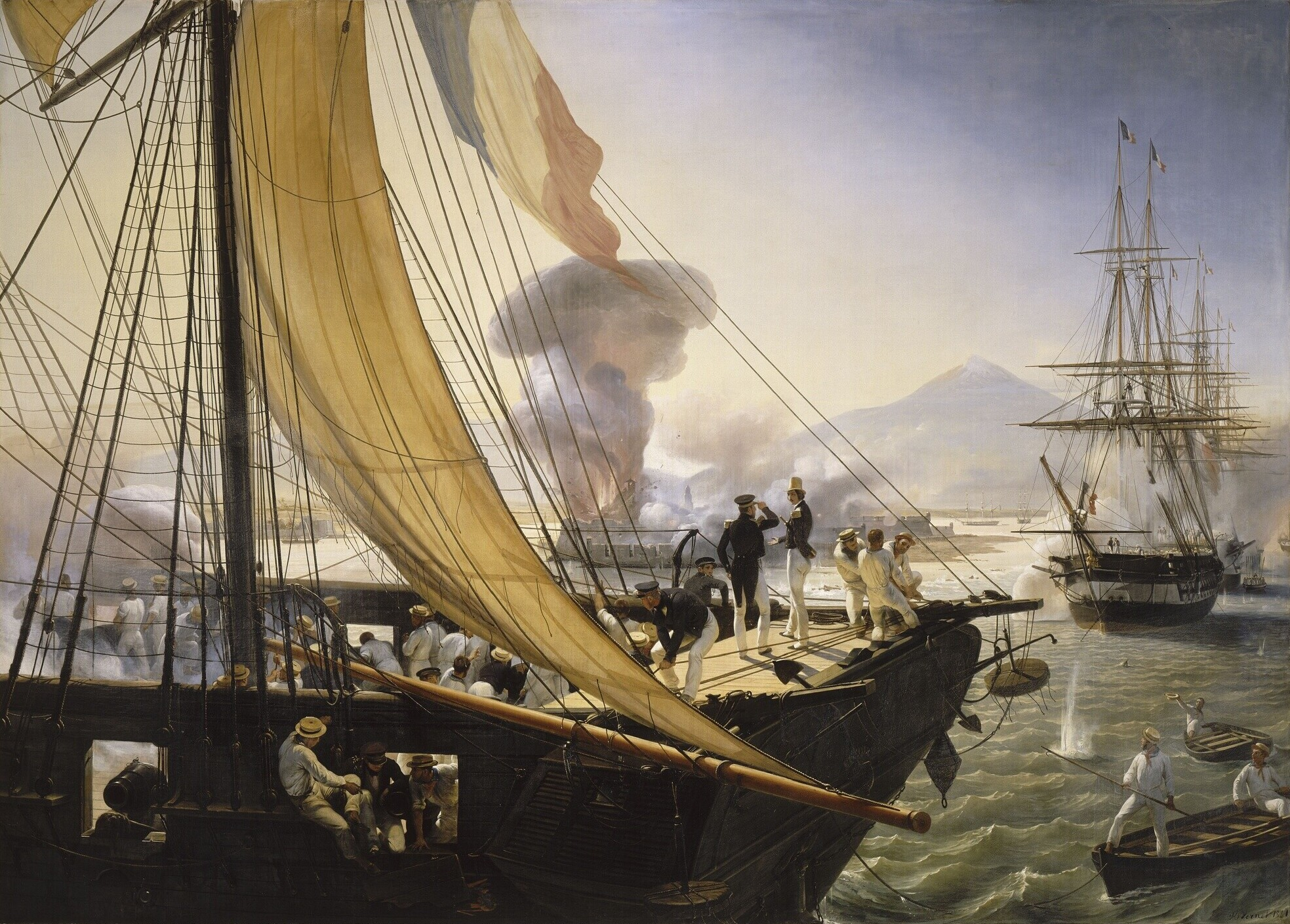
The French Navy bombards San Juan de Ulua (Mexico) during the Pastry War (1838).

- In the 5th century BC, the Achaemenid Empire launched a series of campaigns against Greece to punish certain Greek city-states for involving themselves in the Ionian Revolt.
- In the early 1st century AD, Germanicus engaged in punitive expeditions against the Germanic tribes as repercussion for the Roman Legions that were destroyed in the Battle of Teutoburg Forest.
- In 518, Negus Kaleb of Axum dispatched a punitive expedition against the Himyarite Kingdom in response to the persecution of Christians by the Himyarite Jews.
- In the 13th century, Genghis Khan, the founder of the Mongol Empire, often engaged in punitive expeditions, either as a pretext or to quell rebellions against his rule. Some notable examples include his invasion of Khwarazim and his campaigns against the Western Xia kingdom.
- Also in the 13th century, Kublai Khan, a grandson of Genghis and the founder of the Yuan Dynasty, sent emissaries demanding tribute from the Singhasari kingdom of Java. The ruler of the Singhasari kingdom, Kertanagara, refused to pay tribute and tattooed a Chinese messenger, Meng Qi, on his face. A punitive expedition sent by Kublai Khan arrived off the coast of Java in 1293. Jayakatwang, a rebel from the Kediri Kingdom, had killed Kertanagara by that time. The Mongols allied with Raden Wijaya of Majapahit against Jayakatwang and, once the Singhasari kingdom was destroyed, Wijaya turned against the Mongols and forced them to withdraw in confusion.
- In 1599, the Spanish conquistador Juan de Oñate ordered his nephew Vicente de Zaldívar to engage in a punitive expedition against the Keres natives of Acoma Pueblo. When the Spanish arrived, they fought a three-day battle with the Keres leaving about 800 men, women and children dead.
- During the Eighty Years' War, Spanish Admiral Luis Fajardo made a successful raid to the Caribbean in 1605 with his fleet. He sailed from Spain to Araya, on the Venezuelan coast, where he massacred a fleet of smugglers and Dutch privateers who blocked the area and were engaged in illegally extracting salt.
- During the First Anglo-Powhatan War (1610–1614), Thomas West, 3rd Baron De La Warr (1577–1618), an English nobleman, was appointed Virginia's first royal governor and ordered to defend the colony against the Powhatan. Lord de la Warr waged a punitive campaign to subdue the Powhatan after they had killed the colony's council president, John Ratcliffe.
- In the summer of 1614, Ottomans led by Damat Halil Pasha engaged a successful punitive expedition against Sefer Dā'yl, an insurgent in Tripoli.
- In 1784, a brief expedition was carried out by Denmark and its native allies against the Anlo Ewe in the so-called Sagbadre War.
- From 1838 to 1842, ships of the United States Exploring Expedition engaged in three punitive expeditions against Pacific islanders.
- The First Opium War (1839–1842) was a retaliation against the burning of opiate products by Commissioner Lin Zexu, which resulted in the opening of a number of ports, the cession of Hong Kong to Great Britain, and the Treaty of Nanjing.
- The 1842 Ivory Coast Expedition was led by Matthew C. Perry against the Bereby people of West Africa after two attacks on American merchant ships.
- The Battle of Kabul in 1842 was undertaken by the British against the Afghans following their disastrous retreat from Kabul in which 16,000 people were killed.
- The French Campaign against Korea in 1866 was a response to the earlier execution by Korea of French priests proselytizing in Korea.
- The 1867 Formosa Expedition was a failed punitive operation of the United States to Taiwan.
- The 1868 British Expedition to Abyssinia (Ethiopia) was a rescue mission and punitive expedition against Emperor Tewodros II of Ethiopia, who had imprisoned several missionaries and two representatives of the British government in an attempt to force the British government to comply with his requests for military assistance. The commander of the expedition, General Sir Robert Napier, was victorious in every battle against the troops of Tewodros, captured the Ethiopian capital, and rescued all the hostages.
- The United States expedition to Korea in 1871 was in retaliation to the General Sherman incident, where a U.S. merchant ship was burned as it entered Pyongyang.
- The 1874 Japanese expedition against Formosa.
- Benin Expedition of 1897 was a British punitive action that led to the annexation of the Kingdom of Benin. The New York Times reported on January 13, 1897, that a "punitive expedition" would be formed to "punish the murderers of the Benin City expedition".
- The Eight-Nation Alliance's invasion of China in 1900 was in response to the Siege of the International Legations during the Boxer Rebellion.
- British expedition to Tibet in December 1903-September 1904. The expedition was effectively a temporary invasion by British Indian Armed Forces under the auspices of the Tibet Frontier Commission, whose purported mission was to establish diplomatic relations and resolve the dispute over the border between Tibet and Sikkim.
- The Herero and Nama genocide in German South-West Africa by the German Empire.
- During World War I, the battle of Asiago, nicknamed Strafexpedition (punitive expedition), was an unsuccessful counteroffensive launched by Austria-Hungary against the Kingdom of Italy.
- The Pancho Villa Expedition from 1916 to 1917, led by General John J. Pershing, was an operation in retaliation against Pancho Villa's incursion into the United States.
- Suppression of the 1920 Iraqi Revolt against the British Mandate of Mesopotamia.
- In World War II, German Einsatzgruppen were involved in the mass murders of civilians in Poland and the USSR as the punishment for the acts of resistance and collaboration with the communists.
- During the 1965 Indo-Pakistani War, the Indian offensive across the international border into Pakistan was characterized as a punitive expedition necessitated by Pakistan's offensive across the CFL into Indian Kashmir during Operation Grand Slam.
- The 1979 invasion of Vietnam by China was characterised by Deng Xiaoping as an act of punishment necessitated by Vietnam's invasion of Cambodia, saying that "Children who don't listen have to be spanked."
- The destruction of half of the operational ships of the Islamic Republic of Iran Navy by the United States Navy in 1988 in Operation Praying Mantis was punishment for damaging USS Samuel B. Roberts by mining international waters of the Persian Gulf.
- The 2016 Indo-Pakistani military confrontation began with alleged punitive "surgical strikes" carried out by India. These strikes were a punitive action in response to Pakistan's inaction in curbing the activities of terrorist organisations such as Lashkar-e-Taiba and Jaish-e-Mohammad, the latter of which India held responsible for the Uri attack.
- The 2022 Russian Invasion of Ukraine has been described as a punitive expedition.
- Israel's invasion into the Gaza Strip following the 2023 Hamas-led attack on Israel has been labeled a punitive expedition.

== See also ==
- Letter of marque and reprisal
