= Fort Vredenburgh =

Fort in Ghana

- Part of Dutch Gold Coast
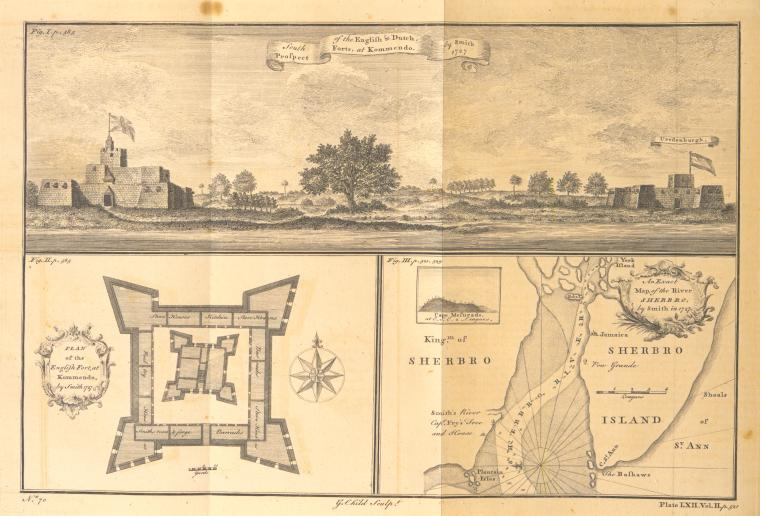
- British Fort Komenda (left) and Dutch Fort Vredenburgh (right).

Location
- Coordinates: 5.051745°N 1.483541°W

Site history
- Built: 1682

Garrison information
- Occupants: Netherlands (1682–1872)

UNESCO World Heritage Site
- Official name: Fort St. Jago (Fort Conraadsburg)
- Location: Elmina, Central Region, Ghana
- Part of: Forts and Castles, Volta, Greater Accra, Central and Western Regions
- Criteria: Cultural: (vi)
- Reference: 34-005
- Inscription: 1979 (3rd Session)

Fort Vredenburgh was a Dutch fort on the Gold Coast, established on the left bank of the Komenda River (Dutch Komenda). The fort exists as preserved ruins. Because of its testimony to European economic and colonial influence in West Africa, the fort was inscribed on the UNESCO World Heritage List in 1979, along with other nearby forts and castles.

== History ==
Fort Vredenburgh was built in 1682 on the left bank of the Komenda River (Dutch Komenda). At the same site, a trading post was established by the Dutch around 1600, but abandoned soon afterwards.

Since halfway through the 17th century, the state of Komenda (a part of the Kingdom of Eguafo), was a site of fierce competition between the English, Dutch, Danish, Brandenburgish and French traders. This competition between European powers was compounded by competition between African states in the region, which concluded changing alliances with the various European powers.

The Dutch had intermittently operated a lodge at Komenda, which they extended into a fort in 1682. Still, they could not prevent Jean-Baptiste du Casse from establishing a French trade post at Komenda in 1687. Du Casse established friendly relations with the powerful local trader John Cabess, but his trading post was destroyed by the Elmina and Eguafo allies of the Dutch about a month after its establishment. In 1689, the Dutch extended their Fort Vredenburgh, but found their influence severely diminished because they had offended Cabess by driving out the French.

At the turn of the 18th century, Komenda was the site of several Komenda Wars, which involved the Dutch and the English and their respective local allies. In 1694, the English built a fort (Fort Komenda) within the range of Fort Vredenburgh on the right bank of the Komenda River (English Komenda) with the help of John Cabess.

The rivalry evidenced by the forts built within each other's reach, was as much a rivalry within the Eguafo state as it was one between the European powers. In fact, at the time of the Komenda Wars, Great Britain and the Dutch Republic were in a personal union, with both states being led by William III of Orange.

== Gallery ==
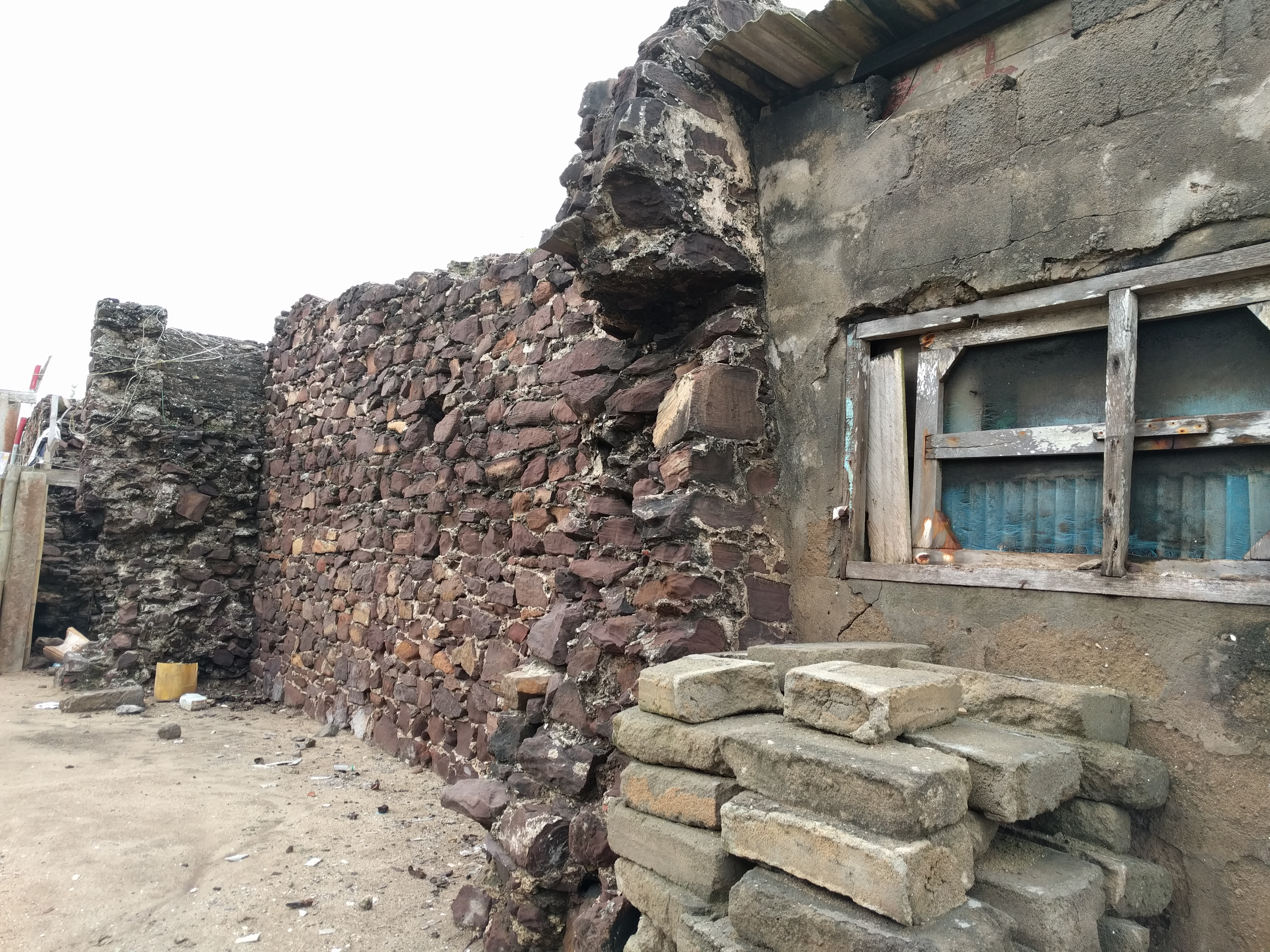
Fort Vredenburg was a fort built by the Dutch in 1682 in the part of Komenda, now known as Dutch Komenda. This picture shows the remains of the

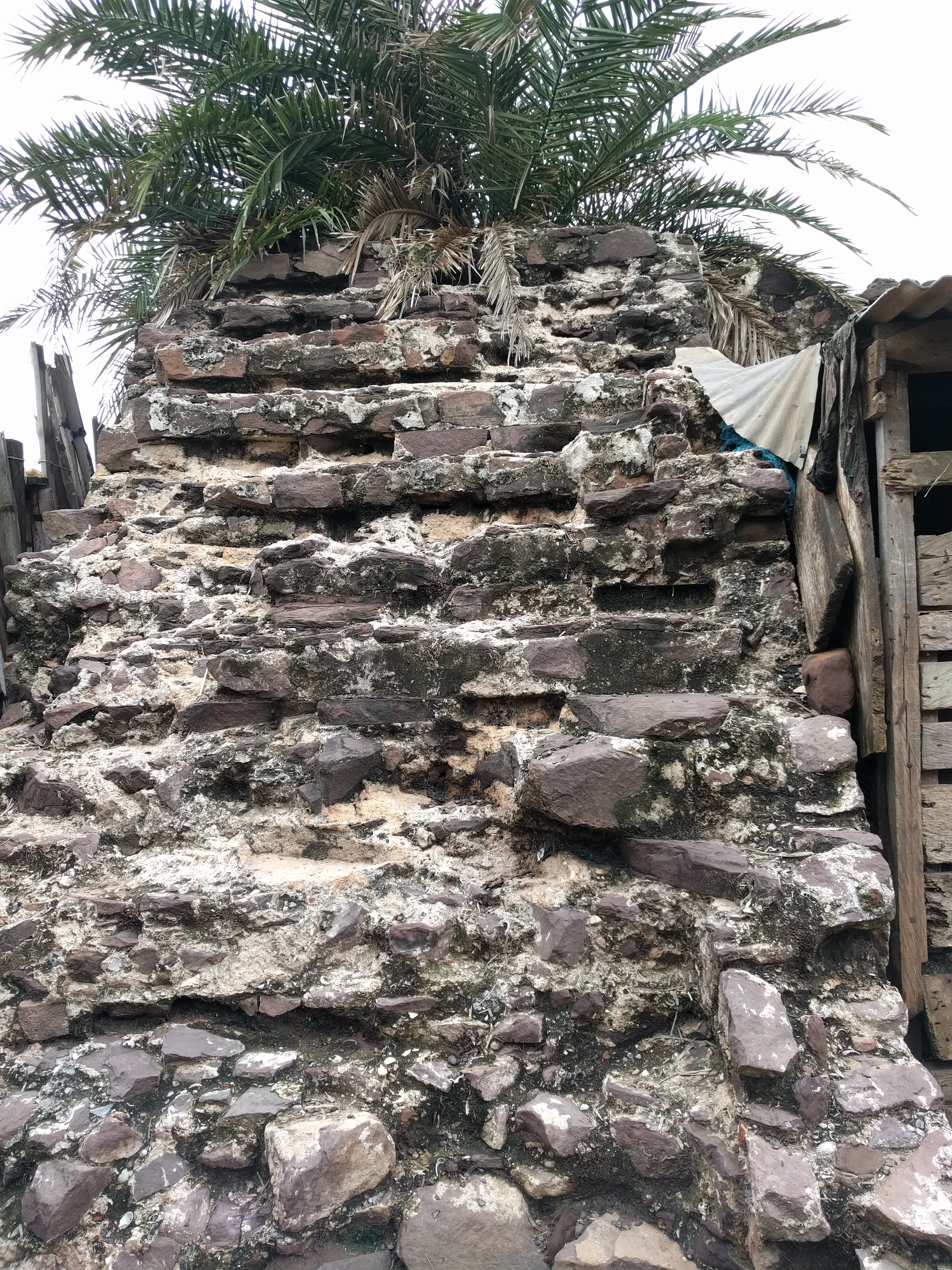
Fort Vredenburg

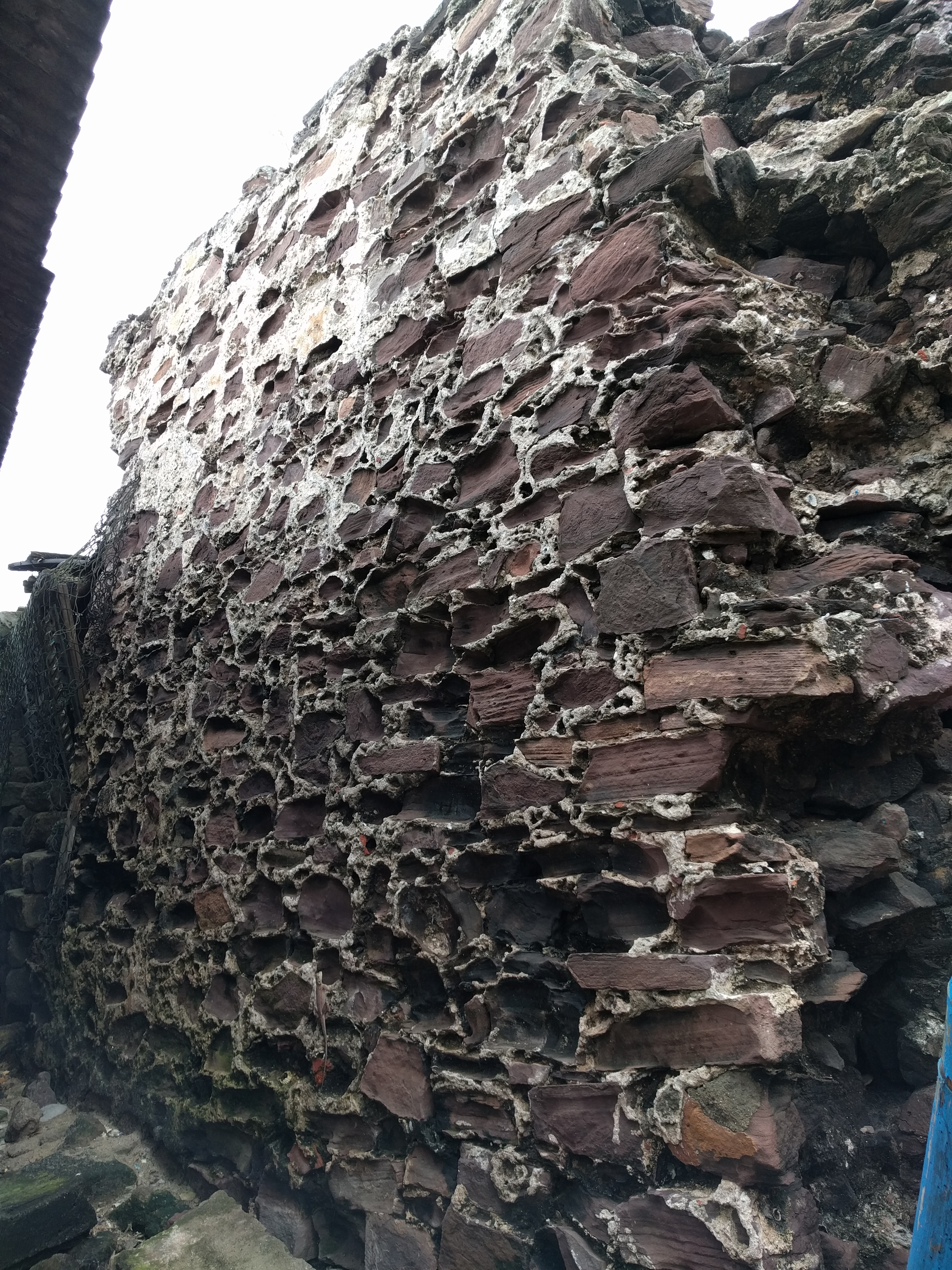
Fort Vredenburg

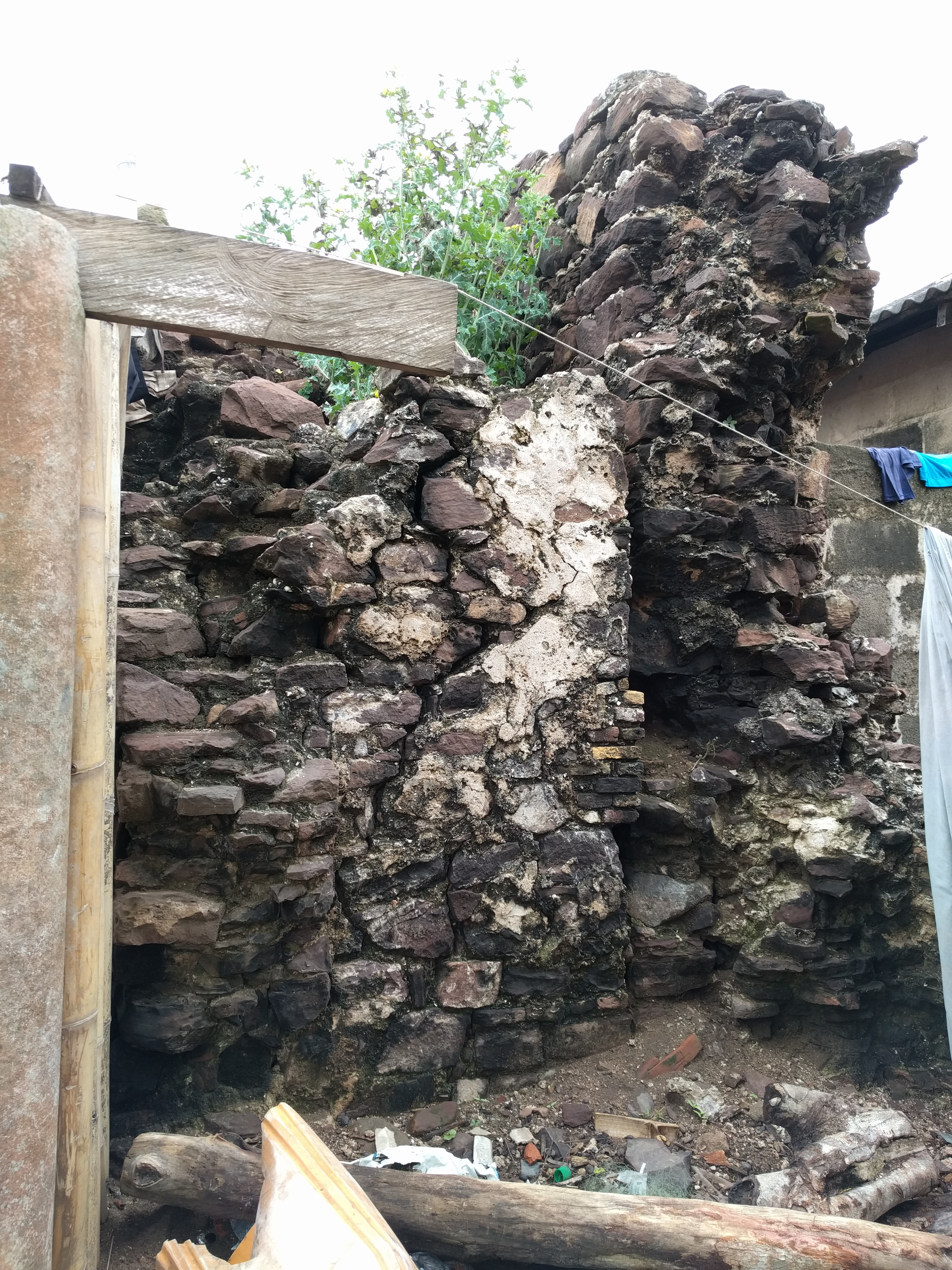
Fort Vredenburg

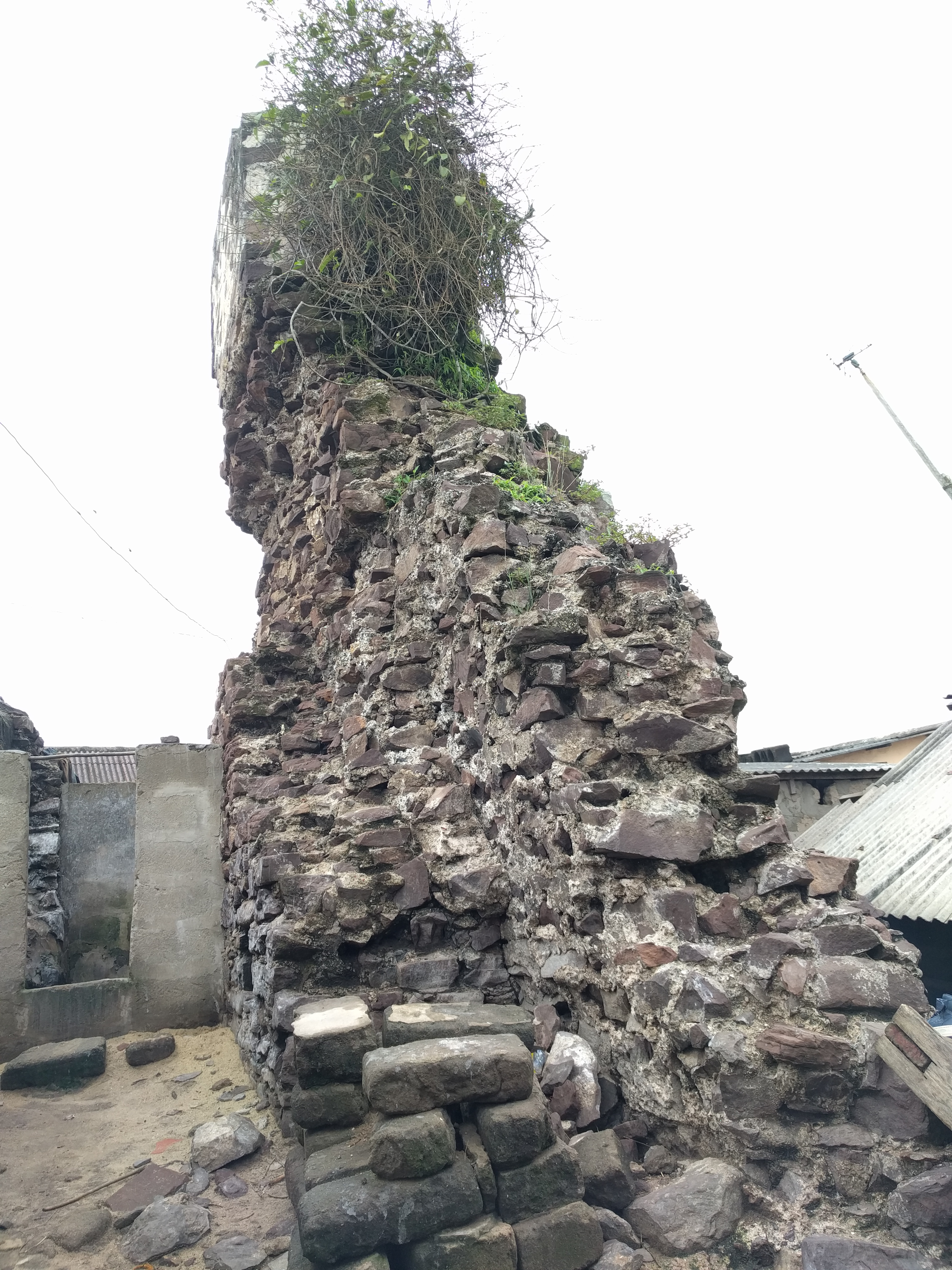
Fort Vredenburg

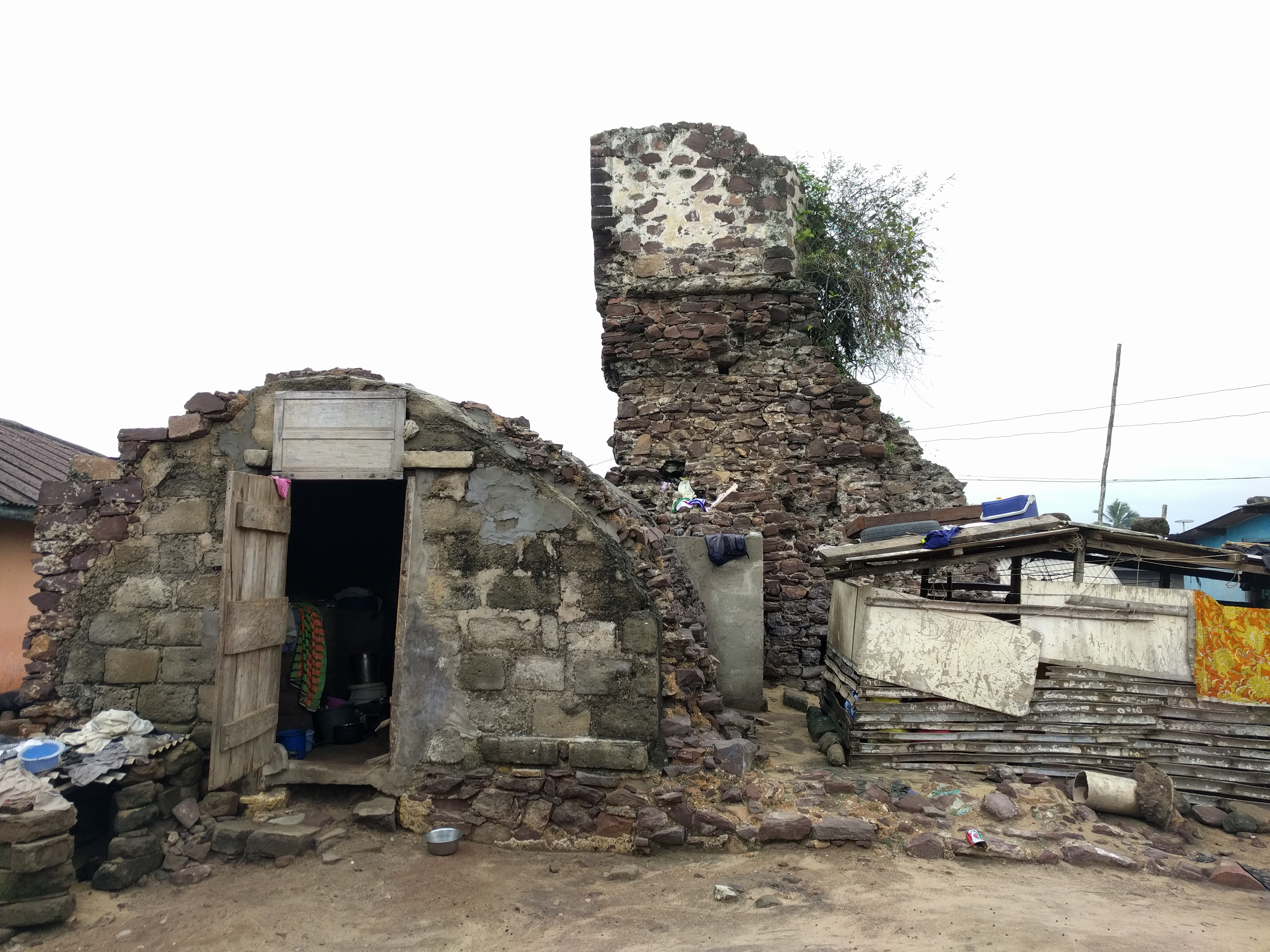
Fort Vredenburgh
