= Thomas Edward Barter =

Thomas Edward Barter was a Cape Coast trader during the 17th century.

Known locally as Tom Ewusi, he was born the son of Afro-European parents; what was then termed a mulatto. The Royal African Company sent him to England in 1690 for an education by his father. He returned to Cape Coast in 1693 and was employed as a middleman for the British. He became an independent trader and rose to prominence as the chief trader in Cape Coast.
