= Komenda, Ghana =

Town in Central Region, Ghana

Komenda Akitekyi Ekitakyi
- Town
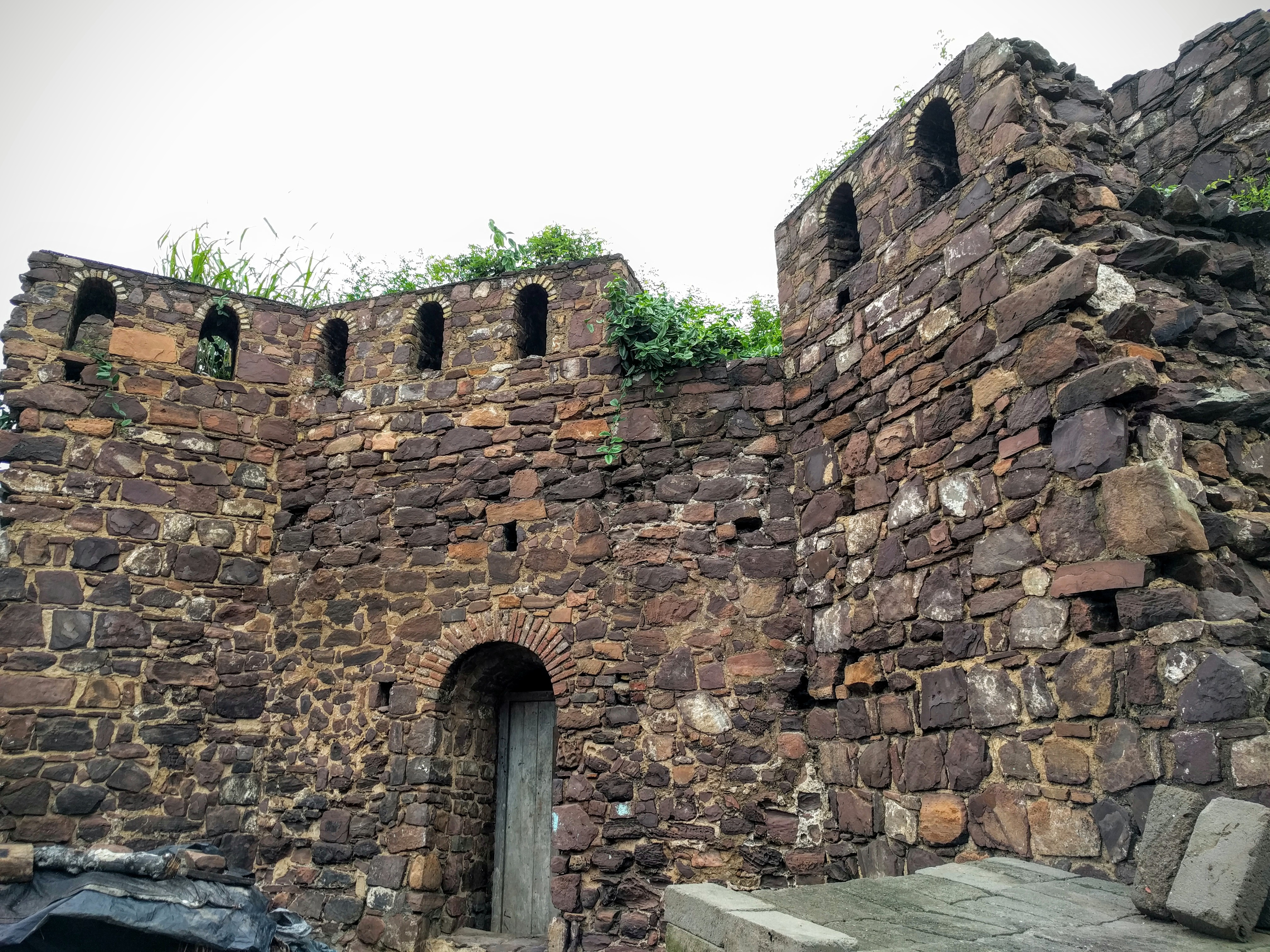
- Fort Komenda in Komenda

- Location of Komenda in Central Region, South Ghana
- Coordinates: 5°05′N 1°49′W
- Country: Ghana
- Region: Central Region
- District: Komenda-Edina-Eguafo-Abrem-Municipal District
- Time zone: GMT
  - Summer (DST): GMT

Komenda (also known as Ekitakyi, Akitekyi) is a town located in the Komenda-Edina-Eguafo-Abrem-Municipal District of the Central Region of Ghana. There is a concrete bridge linking British Komenda and Dutch Komenda.

== History ==
The land was initially Komeh Krom which was named after Komeh, a hunter from Techiman. He arrived in Kanka (Dutch Komenda) and went into agreement with the elders of the land. Later after he settled there, anytime someone was sent to Komeh Krom he/she would be cautioned "Kɔ ma nda" which means "If you go do not sleep". This became the Komenda which means "If you go Komeh Korm do not sleep".

In 2020, the Paramount Queenmother of Komenda was Nana Adwoa Badu II. In 2021, the Chief of Komenda was Nana Kojo Kru II. In 2022, the acting Paramount Chief of Komenda was Nana Kwahin V. In 2023, the Chief of Komenda was Nana Komeh VIII.

== Health ==
- Komenda Health Centre

== Education ==
- Komenda College of Education
- Komenda Senior High Technical School

== Facilities ==
- Komenda Sugar Factory
- Cargo Airport
- Komenda Market
- Komenda Police Station
- Zion Prayer Ministry

== Tourism ==
- Fort Komenda
- Komenda Sea Cave

== Organization ==
- The Progressive Youth, Ghana, a youth organization is located in Komenda

== Notable natives ==
- John Cabess, African merchant and businessman

== Gallery ==
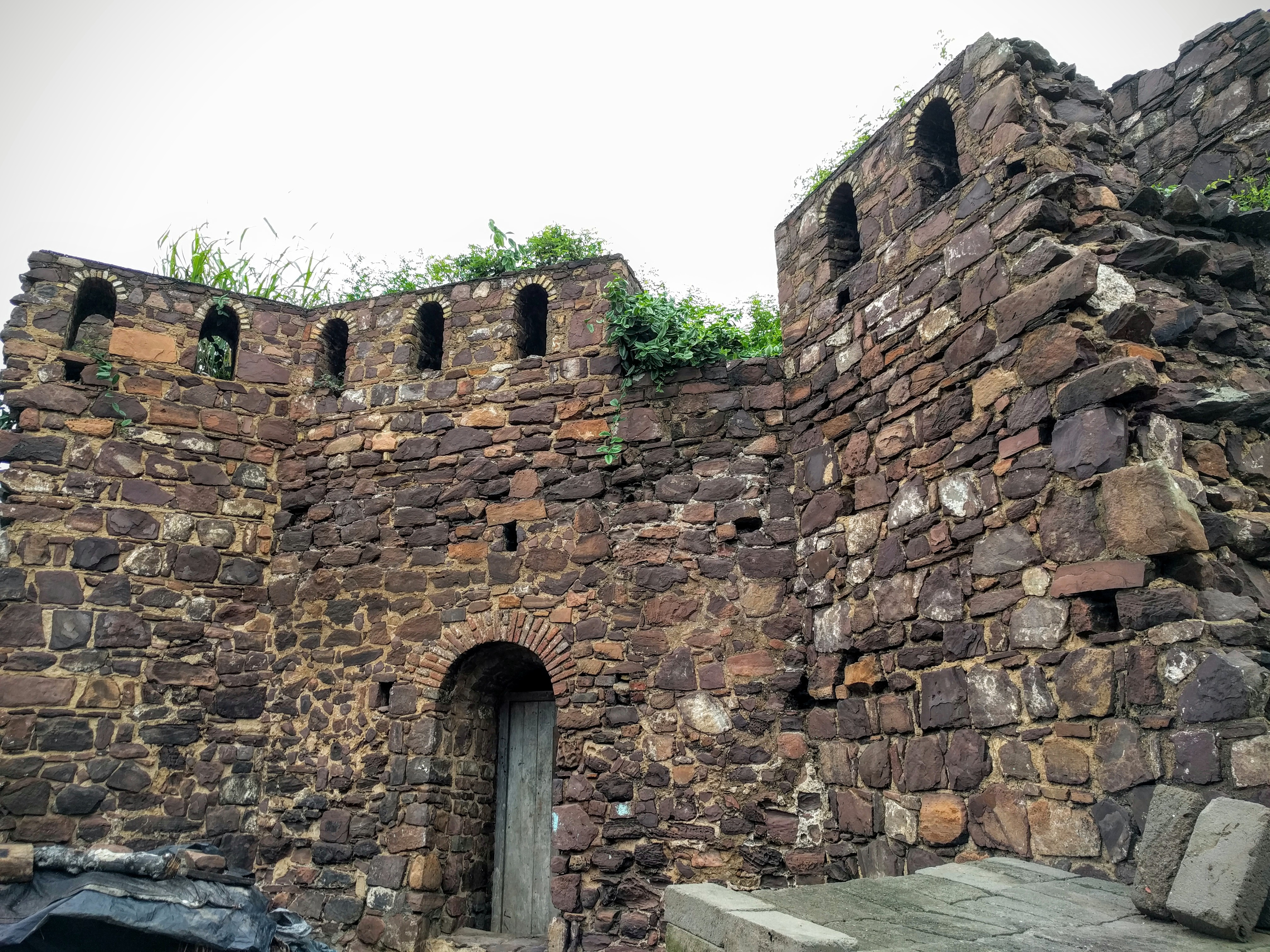
Fort Komenda 05

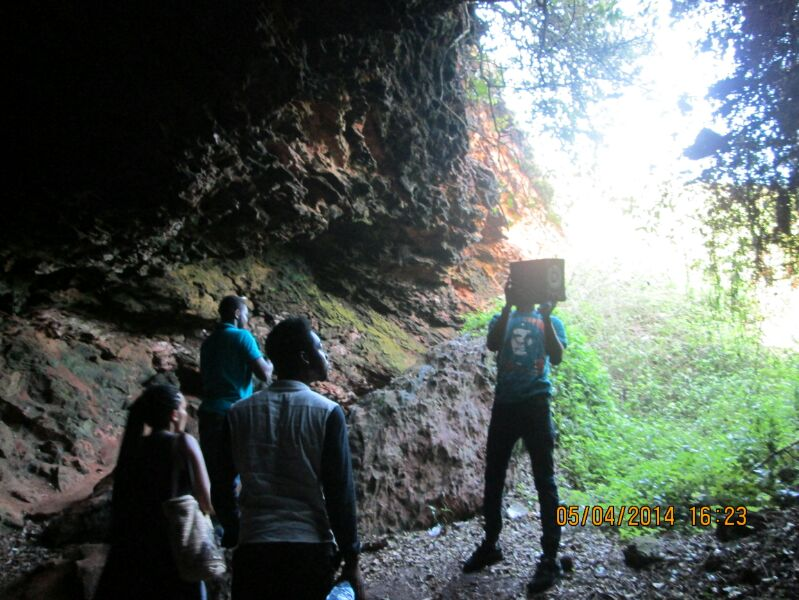
Blow - Hole, Komenda

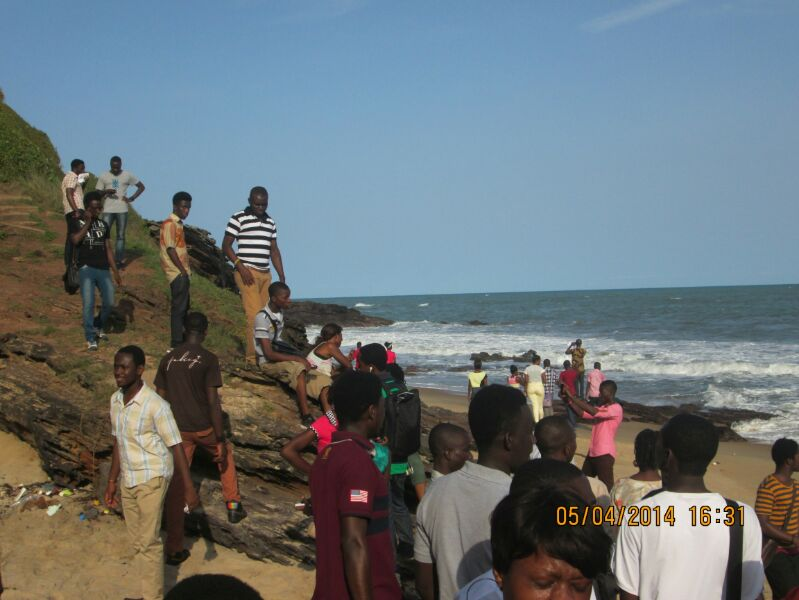
Sandy Beach

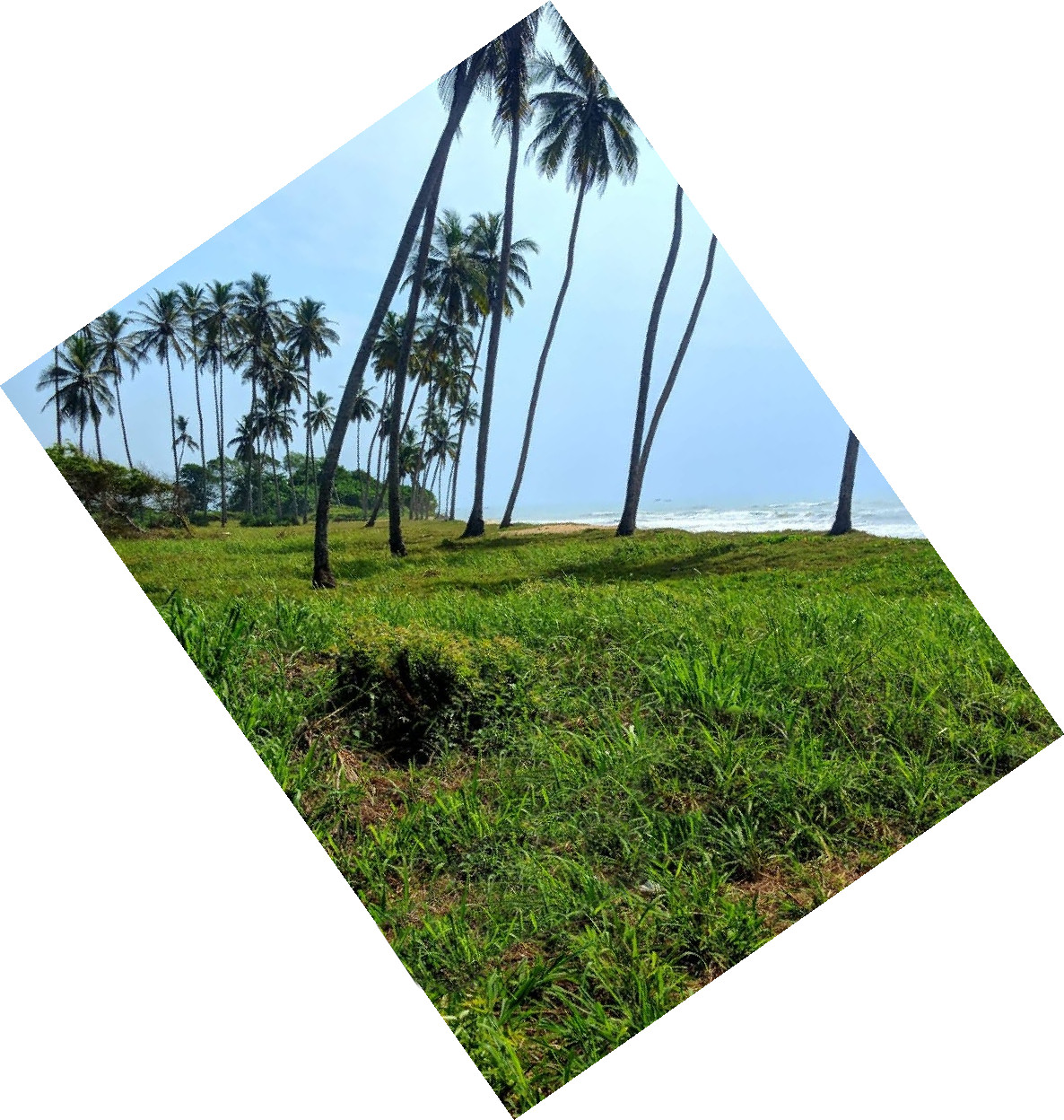
Komenda college of Education's Beach
