= Royal African Company =

English trading company (1660–1752)

- Coat of arms

- Company flag (c. 1665)
- Formerly: Company of Royal Adventurers Trading to Africa
- Type: Private
- Industry: Mercantile trading
- Founded: 1660; 366 years ago in London, England
- Founders: House of Stuart; City of London merchants
- Defunct: 1752
- Successor: African Company of Merchants
- Key people: James II of England, Charles II of England
- Products: Gold, silver, ivory, slaves

The Royal African Company (RAC) was an English trading company established in 1660 by the House of Stuart and City of London merchants to trade along the West African coast. It was overseen by the Duke of York, the brother of Charles II of England; the RAC was founded after Charles II ascended to the English throne in the 1660 Stuart Restoration, and he granted it a monopoly on all English trade with Africa. While the company's original purpose was to trade for gold in the Gambia River, as Prince Rupert of the Rhine had identified gold deposits in the region during the Interregnum, the RAC quickly considered enslaved humans as commodity and began trading in them. It shipped approximately 100,000 African slaves to the Americas (primarily the Caribbean).

Historians have estimated that the RAC shipped more enslaved Africans to the Americas during the Atlantic slave trade than any other company. The RAC also dealt in commodities such as ivory that were primarily sourced from the Gold Coast region. In 1697, William III of England rescinded the company's monopoly under pressure from the Parliament of England, opening up the trade to private investors and merchants. By 1708, the RAC had become insolvent. It survived in a state of much reduced activity until 1752, when its assets were transferred to the newly founded African Company of Merchants, which lasted until 1821.

== History ==
=== Background ===
On the west coast of Africa the few Europeans lived in fortified factory (trading posts). They had no sovereignty over the land or its inhabitants; they had very little immunity to tropical diseases, so they were at risk for illness and death. The coastal tribes acted as intermediaries between Europeans and Africans enslaving humans in the interior. There was little incentive for European men to explore up the rivers, and few of them did so. The atmosphere might have been one of quiet routine for the traders had there not been acute rivalries between the European powers, especially the Dutch, who made use of African allies against their European rivals. Before the Restoration in 1660, the Dutch had been the main suppliers of slaves to the plantations of the English West Indies but it was part of the policy of the English Navigation Acts to oust them from this lucrative trade. Between 1676 and 1700, the value of gold exports from Africa was similar to the total value of exports of enslaved humans. After the Peace of Ryswick in 1697, the price of enslaved Africans and the number exported doubled; from then, until trade diminished after 1807, enslaved Africans were clearly the most valuable export of Africa.

=== Company of Royal Adventurers Trading into Africa ===
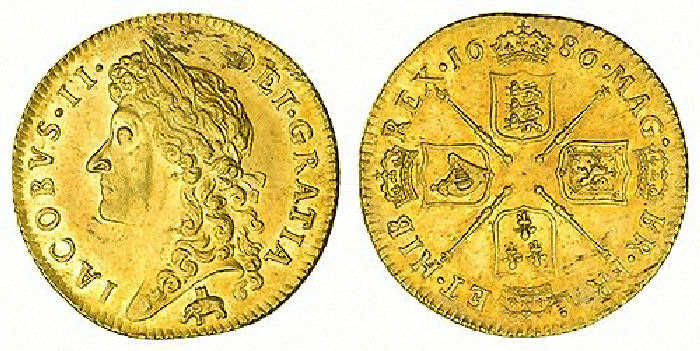
1686 English guinea showing the Royal African Company's symbol, an elephant and castle, under the bust of James II

Originally known as the Company of Royal Adventurers Trading into Africa, by its royal charter issued on 18 December 1660 it was granted a monopoly over English trade along the west coast of Africa, with the principal objective being the search for gold. The company was to be run by a committee of six: the Earl of Pembroke, Lord Craven, Sir George Carteret, Ellis Leighton and Cornelius Vermuyden.

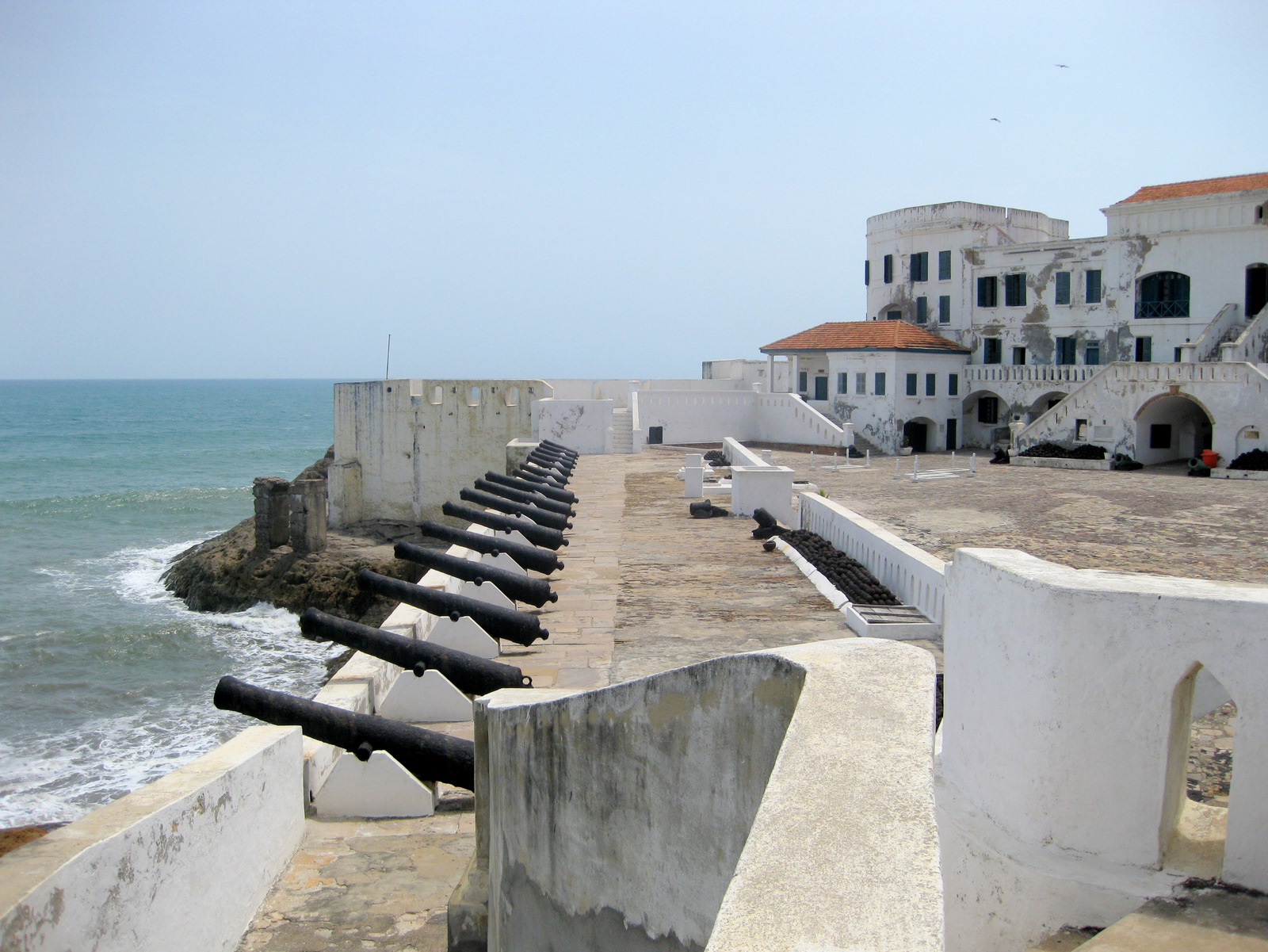
Cape Coast Castle, capital of the British Gold Coast

In 1663, a new charter was obtained, which also explicitly mentioned the trade in enslaved Africans, giving them The monopoly granted to the company was intended to last for one thousand years.

In January 1663, the Duke of York promised the Barbados Council and Assembly an annual delivery of 3,000 Africans at 17 pounds a head to Barbados and other Caribbean islands per their petition to his brother, King Charles II.

From an early ledger kept by the Barbados factors it appears that from 11 August 1663 to 17 March 1664, the peak time of the year for transportation, 3,075 slaves were presented to the company's factors. These were analysed as follows: 1,051 men, 1,018 women, 136 boys and 56 girls. These people were sold in return partly for sugar and partly for money. It appears that the average price for these slaves was a little over sixteen pounds per head.

This was the third English African Company, but it made a fresh start in the trade in enslaved Africans; there was only one factory of importance for it to take over from the East India Company, which had leased it as a calling-place on the sea-route round the Cape. This was Cormantin, a few miles east of the Dutch station of Cape Coast Castle, now in Ghana. The 1663 charter prohibited others to trade in "redwood, elephants' teeth (tusks), negroes, slaves, hides, wax, guinea grains, or other commodities of those countries". In 1663, as a prelude to the Dutch war, Captain Holmes's expedition captured or destroyed all the Dutch settlements on the coast. In 1664, Fort James was founded on an island about twenty miles up the Gambia River, as a new centre for English trade and power. This, however, was only the beginning of a series of captures and recaptures. In the same year, de Ruyter won back all the Dutch forts except Cape Coast Castle and also took Cormantin.

The number of Africans trafficked in just the 3 years between 1663 and 1666 "based on serving records identifying captive numbers and place of disembarkation" was 21,298. The number by port of disembarkation was as follows: Barbados 8,778, Jamaica 4,445, and St. Kitts, Suriname, and Nevis 1,250. A total of 1,718 were transported to Spanish agents in exchange for silver, and individuals who died on the Atlantic crossing totalled 5,107.

In 1667, the Treaty of Breda confirmed Cape Coast Castle to the English.

Forts served as staging and trading stations, and the company was given the power through charters to seize any English ships that attempted to operate in violation of its monopoly (known as interlopers). Interlopers were imprisoned and tried without due process in vice-admiralty courts. In the "prize court", the King received half of the proceeds and the company half from the seizure of these interlopers.

The company fell heavily into debt in 1667, during the Second Anglo-Dutch War. For several years after that, the company maintained some desultory trade, including licensing single-trip private traders, but its biggest effort was the creation in 1668 of the Gambia Adventurers. This new company was separately subscribed and granted a ten-year licence for African trade north of the Bight of Benin with effect from 1 January 1669. At the end of 1678, the licence to the Gambia Adventurers expired and its Gambian trade was merged into the company.

=== Royal African Company of England ===
The African Company was ruined by its losses and surrendered its charter in 1672, to be followed by the still more ambitious Royal African Company of England. Its new charter was broader than the old one and included the right to set up forts and factories, maintain troops, and exercise martial law in West Africa, in pursuit of trade in "gold, silver, negroes, slaves, goods, wares and merchandises whatsoever". Until 1687, the company was very prosperous. It set up six forts on the Gold Coast, and another post at Ouidah, farther east on the so-called Slave Coast, which became its principal centre for trade. Cape Coast Castle was strengthened and rose to be second in importance only to the Dutch factory at Elmina. Anglo-Dutch rivalry was, however, henceforward unimportant in the region and the Dutch were not strong enough to take aggressive measures here in the Third Anglo-Dutch War.

=== Trade in enslaved Africans ===
In the 1680s, the company was transporting about 5,000 enslaved people a year to markets, primarily in the Caribbean across the Atlantic. Many were branded with the letters "DoY", for its Governor, the Duke of York, who succeeded his brother on the throne in 1685, becoming King James II. Other enslaved Africans were branded with the company's initials, RAC, on their chests. Historian William Pettigrew states that this company "shipped more enslaved African women, men and children to the Americas than any other single institution during the entire period of the transatlantic slave trade", and that investors in the company were fully aware of its activities and intended to profit from this exploitation.

Between 1672 and 1731, the Royal African Company invested in ships which transported 186,748 enslaved people on (652 voyages) to English colonies in the Americas. Of those transported, 16,077 enslaved people died en route. The predecessor Company of Royal Adventurers (1662–1672) transported 27,489 enslaved people on company-invested ships (105 voyages), of whom 670 died during the passage.

=== Later activities and insolvency ===
In 1689, the company acknowledged that it had lost its monopoly with the overthrow of the Stuart monarchy in the Glorious Revolution 1688–89, and it ceased issuing letters of marque. Edward Colston transferred a large segment of his original shareholding to William III at the beginning of 1689, securing the new regime's favour. To maintain the company and its infrastructure and to end its monopoly, parliament passed the Trade with Africa Act 1697 (9 Will. 3. c. 26). Among other provisions, the act opened the African trade to all English merchants who paid a ten per cent levy to the company on all goods exported from Africa.

From 1694 to 1700, the company was a major participant in the Komenda Wars in the port city Komenda in the Eguafo Kingdom in modern-day Ghana. The company allied with a merchant prince named John Cabess and various neighbouring African kingdoms to depose the king of Eguafo and establish a permanent fort and factory in Komenda. The English took two French forts and lost them again, after which the French destroyed Fort James. The place appears to have been soon regained and in the War of Spanish Succession to have been twice retaken by the French. In the treaty of Utrecht it remained English. The French wars caused considerable losses to the company.

The company was unable to withstand competition on the terms imposed by the act and in 1708 became insolvent, surviving until 1750 in a state of much reduced activity. In 1709 Charles Davenant published Reflections upon the Constitution and Management of Trade to Africa, in which he "reverted to his normal attitude of suspicion and outright hostility towards the Dutch." This pamphlet advocated renewing the Royal African Company's monopoly on slave trade on the basis that the Dutch competition "necessitated the maintenance of forts, which only a joint-stock company could afford." Captain John Massey was sent as engineer to the RAC fort at Gambia River in the early 1720s; finding the fort ill-supplied and with his soldiers dying, he turned pirate alongside George Lowther.

The company continued purchasing and transporting slaves until 1731, when it abandoned slaving in favour of ivory and gold dust.

From 1668 to 1722, the Royal African Company provided gold to the English Mint. Coins made with such gold are designed with an elephant below the bust of the king and/or queen. This gold also gave the coinage its name, the guinea.

== Members and officials ==
At its incorporation, the constitution of the company specified a Governor, Sub Governor, Deputy Governor and 24 Assistants. The Assistants (also called Members of the Court of Assistants) can be considered equivalent to a modern-day board of directors.

- James Stuart, Duke of York, the future King James II – Governor of the company from 1660 to 1688; who as king continued to be its chief stockholder.
- Edward Colston (1636–1721), merchant, philanthropist, and Member of Parliament, was a shareholder in the Royal African Company from 1680 to 1692; from 1689 to 1690 he was its Deputy Governor, a senior executive position.
- Charles Hayes (1678–1760), mathematician and chronologer, was sub-governor of the Royal African Company in 1752, when it was dissolved.
- Malachy Postlethwayt, director and propagandist of the company.

== List of notable investors and officials ==
- Charles II of England
- Sir Edmund Andros
- Sir John Banks
- Benjamin Bathurst, Deputy Governor of the Leeward Islands
- Henry Bennet, 1st Earl of Arlington
- George Villiers, 2nd Duke of Buckingham
- Sir John Buckworth, 1622/23–1687
- Sir Josiah Child
- Sir Robert Clayton
- Sir George Carteret
- John Cass
- Sir Peter Colleton
- Anthony Ashley Cooper, 1st Earl of Shaftesbury
- Earl of Craven
- Lawrence Du Puy
- Sir Samuel Dashwood
- Ferdinand Gorges grandson of Ferdinando Gorges
- Francis, Lord Hawley
- George Frideric Handel
- Sir Jeffrey Jeffreys, Commander of affairs of Leeward Isles in England 1690 – c. 1696, Assistant to the Royal African Company 1684–1686, 1692–1698
- Sir John Lawrence
- John Locke
- Sir John Moore
- Samuel Pepys
- James Phipps of Cape Coast Castle
- Thomas Povey
- Sir William Prichard
- Sir Gabriel Roberts
- Prince Rupert
- Tobias Rustat
- Robert Aske
- Sir John Shaw, 1st Baronet
- Sir Robert Vyner, 1st Baronet
- Matthew Wren

== Dissolution ==
Map of Royal African Company factories transferred to the African Company of Merchants.

The Royal African Company was dissolved by the African Company Act 1750, with its assets being transferred to the African Company of Merchants. These principally consisted of nine trading posts on the Gold Coast known as factories: Fort Anomabo, Fort James, Fort Sekondi, Fort Winneba, Fort Apollonia, Fort Tantumquery, Fort Metal Cross, Fort Komenda and Cape Coast Castle, the last of which was the administrative centre.

== See also ==
- List of trading companies
- Triangular trade – Trade among three ports or regions (in this context, trinkets and firearms from Britain to West Africa, slaves to the Americas, sugar and tobacco to Britain)
