= Ivory Coast expedition =

1842 military expedition

Coordinates: 4.6769°N 7.0761°W

- Part of the African Slave Trade Patrol and the Blockade of Africa
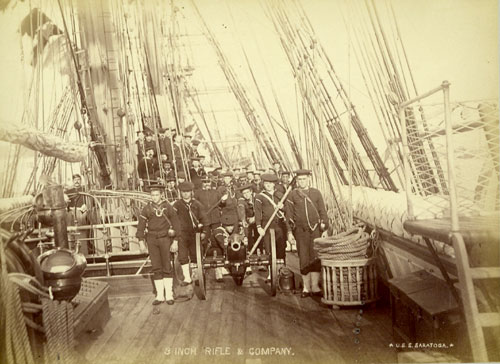
- Veterans of the expedition on board Saratoga in 1842.
Date	June–December 1842
Location	Ivory Coast, Liberia, Atlantic Ocean
Result	American victory: 8 Villages (including Little Bereby) destroyed

Belligerents
United States	Bereby

Commanders and leaders
(United States) Matthew C. Perry	Ben Crack-O †

Strength
Land: 50 marines 150 sailors Sea: 1 frigate 2 sloops-of-war 1 brigantine	unknown

The Ivory Coast expedition, or the Liberia expedition, was a naval operation in 1842, launched by the United States against the West African Bereby people. After the attacks on the merchant ships Mary Carver and Edward Barley, the American Congress approved a punitive expedition to the area and placed Commodore Matthew C. Perry in command. The expedition was successful in exacting redress by destroying the fortified town of Little Bereby and by killing the chief responsible for the attacks on American shipping.

== History ==
=== Expedition ===
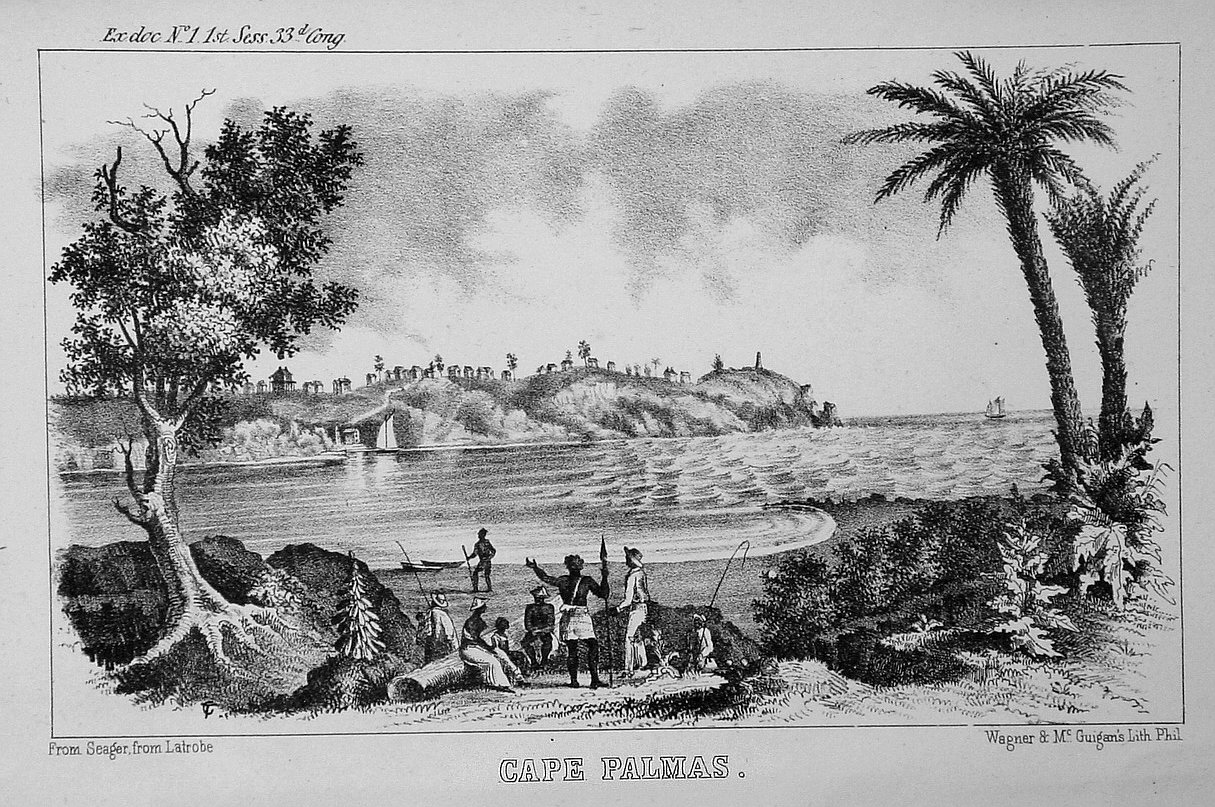
An etching of Cape Palmas in 1853.

The expedition to the Ivory Coast began on June 6, 1842, when Commodore Perry hoisted sail at New York City in the 22-gun sloop-of-war Saratoga. At Porto Grande, in the Cape Verde Islands, Perry later transferred his flag to the 38-gun frigate Macedonian, which participated in the operation along with the 16-gun sloop Decatur and the 10-gun brigantine Porpoise. All of the ships, except Porpoise, had a Marine Detachment aboard. From Cape Verde the Americans headed toward the coast, their mission being to support Liberia, an American colony for freedmen, in suppressing the slave trade and the piratical tribes in the region. This meant conducting an investigation of the Mary Carver and Edward Barley incidents. Perry arrived off the West African coast near Sinoe in mid-November and his first objective was to gain proof regarding the piracy in that area. Accordingly, the commodore disguised Porpoise as a merchantman and sent her in to shore. Almost immediately war-canoes appeared and tried to take control of the ship, but Commander Stellwagen was able to get away without firing a shot. Sinoe was selected as a base, partly because the Sinoe tribe was suspected of treachery as well as the Bereby tribe.

It was around this time that the Porpoise left the expedition for duty elsewhere. Early in the morning of November 29, a party of seventy-five marines and sailors landed at Sinoe where Perry had a meeting, or palaver, with Governor Joseph Jenkins Roberts of Liberia and his staff as well as the "twenty kings" to discuss the earlier incidents. During the palaver the African leaders claimed that the American sailors were the "aggressors" and that the Sinoes attacked in defense of themselves. Either way Commodore Perry ordered that the native's villages be burned. Three prisoners were also sent to Monrovia and the landing party then returned to their ships, taking Governor Roberts with them. By December 1, the three navy vessels were off Blue Barra where another landing took place to escort Perry for another meeting with African authorities. The party returned later that night after dispersing gifts as a sign of friendship. The shore party made another landing at Setra Koo on December 5 for the meeting with a "principal chief". Again the meeting was successful, so Perry sailed for Cape Palmas the same night and anchored off the town of Caval on December 7 where another palaver was held with the African Chief Ben Crack-O who was the overall king of the tribes in the area.

==== Battle of Little Bereby ====
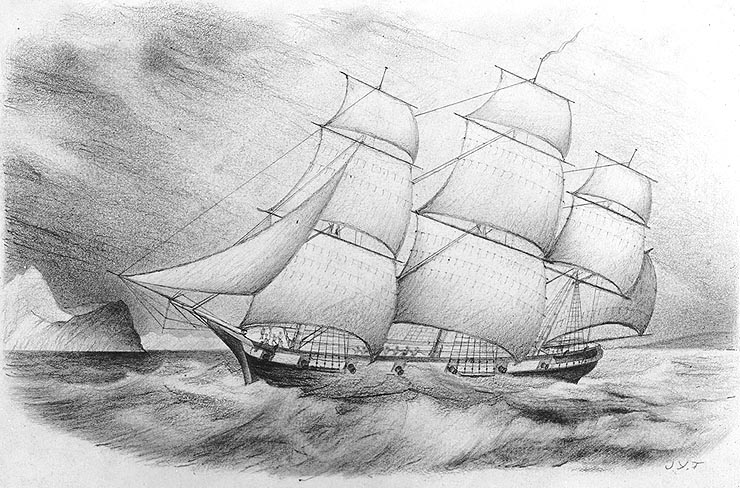
A drawing of USS Decatur, circa 1839.

The landing at Caval was a tense one though there was no fighting. Perry stationed sentries at the gates of the royal kraal to help with escape should it be necessary. Crack-O denied that his people had done anything wrong, so he touched his ears and his tongue, with his sword, as a gesture of truthfulness. Governor Roberts asked Crack-O if he would attend the "Great Palaver" at Little Bereby and he accepted. Next Perry sailed his squadron for Little Bereby on December 11 and arrived on December 14 and landed his fifty marines and 150 sailors. The meeting was held in a house about fifty yards from the kraal gates, during which Roberts began discussing with Crack-O the Mary Carver and the Edward Barley affairs. It was apparent that the king was not telling the truth, so Commodore Perry stepped closer to Crack-O to advise him to stop lying and a scuffle ensued. The chief attempted to drag Perry to his spear, but the commodore threw off his attacker, who then left the house as fast as he could. But before getting out the door, a marine sergeant opened fire with his musket and hit the king while two others bayoneted him. Simultaneously the native interpreter ran out of the house and skirmishing erupted between the American sentries and some Bereby riflemen.

Now that hostilities had begun, Perry ordered his men to burn the town, and, after carrying out the objective, the expedition was returning to their ships when ambushed by native warriors in the woods. Another skirmish resulted and the marines and sailors charged towards the Africans and routed them. The three American warships also opened fire and helped silence the enemy, and a few war-canoes were captured as well. When the battle was over, many of the Africans were killed or wounded though the Americans suffered no casualties. Perry then sailed down the coast and the following morning he detected another Bereby settlement. The marines and sailors were again landed and they destroyed seven villages by burning them and inflicted serious losses upon the natives themselves, without suffering any casualties. After this mission the commodore decided that the Bereby people had been punished enough, so he ended the expedition and proceeded on with other duties. Chief Crack-O's body was buried at sea and his spear was taken as a prize by Perry. Pieces of Mary Carver and her flag were also found at the kraal, evidence that the Bereby were responsible for the attack.

== See also ==
- Africa Squadron
- West Africa Squadron
- Opening of Japan
- Sumatran expeditions
- Battle of Drummond's Island
- First Fiji Expedition
- Second Fiji Expedition
- Formosa Expedition
- Nukapu Expedition
