= Komenda Wars =

1694–1700 series of wars in Ghana

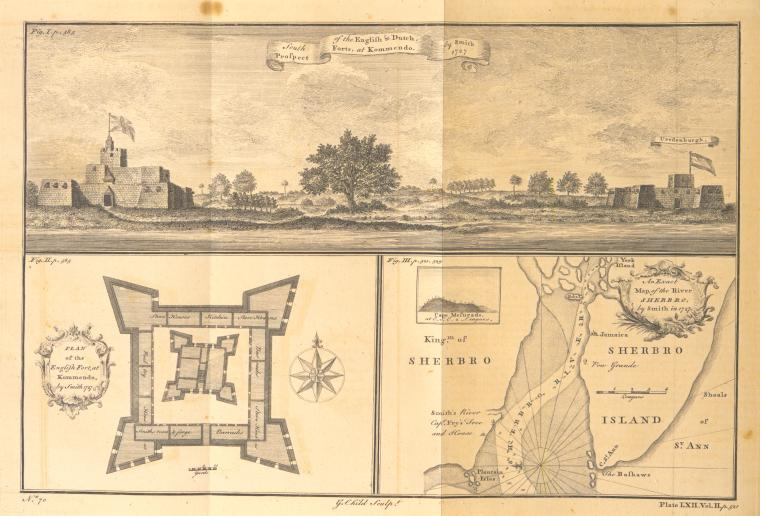
Neighboring English Fort Komenda and Dutch Fort Vredenburgh in Komenda

The Komenda Wars were a series of wars from 1694 until 1700 largely between the Dutch West India Company and the English Royal African Company in the Eguafo Kingdom in the present day state of Ghana, over trade rights. The Dutch were trying to keep the English out of the region to maintain a trade monopoly, while the English were attempting to re-establish a fort in the city of Komenda. The fighting included forces of the Dutch West India Company, the Royal African Company, the Eguafo Kingdom, a prince of the kingdom attempting to rise to the throne, the forces of a powerful merchant named John Cabess, other Akan tribes and kingdoms like Twifo and Denkyira. There were four separate periods of warfare, including a civil war in the Eguafo Kingdom, and the wars ended with the English placing Takyi Kuma into power in Eguafo. Because of the rapidly shifting alliances between European and African powers, historian John Thornton has found that "there is no finer example of [the] complicated combination of European rivalry merging with African rivalry than the Komenda Wars."

== Preceding conditions ==
The Dutch West India Company (WIC) and the Eguafo Kingdom engaged in an earlier set of hostilities in 1688. The Dutch and the English had both established factories in the port city of Komenda. In 1687, the French negotiated with the king of Eguafo to open a factory in Komenda and the WIC responded by launching its military to force the king of Eguafo to expel the French. The Dutch tried to induce neighboring states to attack Eguafo at the same time, while the French provided gold to the King to pay the neighboring states to remain out of fighting. In the end, the Twifo did join the Dutch and secured trade concessions in Komenda as a result. The violence resulted in the killing of the King of Eguafo and a prince who allied with the Dutch was placed on the throne named Takyi. Komenda then became largely controlled by the Dutch and their allies Twifo. This situation gradually resulted in tensions between Takyi and both actors. As a result, Takyi repeatedly tried to balance English interests in the port of Komenda.

== Series of wars ==
The Komenda wars was a series of four different military engagements defined by shifting alliances and the involvement of military forces from multiple kingdoms in the region. The wars ended with the enthronement by the English of Takyi Kuma as the King of Eguafo. Willem Bosman was the primary chronicler of the Komenda Wars, being an active participant with the Dutch West India Company and publishing his journals in 1703.

In general, the protracted war included the Dutch West India Company (WIC) and the English Royal African Company (RAC) supporting different sides in the Eguafo Kingdom to support their desired trade privileges. The forces of John Cabess, a prominent merchant in the city of Komenda, was closely allied to the English and often took their side. The war started with John Cabess attacking the Dutch Fort Vredenburgh in Komenda and the Dutch then organizing regional forces against the King in Eguafo, Takyi. Eventually, sides switched and the English began supporting a challenger to the Eguafo throne, Takyi Kuma. The fighting brought a number of other Akan polities in the region into the fighting, including: Adom, Akani, Akrons, Asebu, Cabess Terra, Denkyira, Fante, Ahanta and Twifo.

=== First war ===
First Komenda War
- Part of Komenda Wars
Date	1694-1695
Location	Eguafo and Komenda

Belligerents
Eguafo, John Cabess, Royal African Company, Denkyira (Akan kingdom), Fante (Akan kingdom), Asebu (Akan kingdom)	Dutch West India Company, Cabess Terra (Akan kingdom), Twifo (Akan kingdom)

The first war began as a result of disputes between a prominent African merchant, John Cabess (sometimes Kabes) who had armed forces loyal to him, in Eguafo and the Dutch West India Company (WIC). Cabess was a formal and loyal ally to the Royal African Company and assisted their operations in the region. The Dutch, in competition with the Royal African Company, had a series of disputes with Cabess including an instance in 1684 with the Dutch panyarring Cabess and taking his goods. The disputes intensified in November 1694 when Cabess invited the Royal African Company to return to Komenda and then attacked Dutch miners outside of the city. With the English reoccupying the formerly English fort in Komenda they were fired upon by the Dutch fort.

As a result of these hostilities, the English, Dutch, and Eguafo king began contacting possible allies in surrounding African kingdoms to prepare for a war. Cabess Terra and Twifo initially joined the Dutch, but this alliance was stopped when Denkyira threatened to attack Twifo if war should break out. The Adoms took money from Eguafo to remain neutral in any fighting.

War broke out in February 1695 when the forces of John Cabess attacked the Dutch fort and prevented reinforcements. On April 28, 1695, the Twifo forces were defeated. The war then largely took the form of panyarring where one force would seize members of other groups regularly. John Cabess and the Dutch began negotiations that year, but on June 26, the Dutch head at the fort, Willem Bosman, drew a pistol and attempted to shoot at Cabess. Panyarring and occasional violence broke out until a short-lived peace settlement was reached in the end of 1695.

=== Second war ===
Second Komenda War
- Part of Komenda Wars
Date	1696
Location	Eguafo and Komenda

Belligerents
Eguafo, John Cabess, Akrons (Akan kingdom)	Dutch West India Company, Takyi Kuma (Prince of Eguafo), Akani (Akan kingdom), Adom (Akan kingdom)

On January 21, 1696, a young prince of Eguafo began a civil war to attempt and claim the throne of the kingdom. The name of the young prince was often rendered as Takyi Kuma or Little Takyi (in relation to the current king Takyi). The Dutch supported Takyi Kuma and were able to get the neighboring states of Adom and Akani to join in the fight supporting Takyi Kuma. The Akrons joined Takyi in defending Eguafo. The fighting ended quickly with Takyi Kuma and his forces losing on March 20. The loss resulted in formal negotiations between the Dutch and Eguafo. Jan van Sevenhuysen, the new WIC Governor of the Gold Coast made peace with Eguafo which allowed the Dutch to retain their factory and fort in Komenda. However, the English and Dutch hostilities remained high and their forts in Komenda exchanged regular, minor hostilities.

=== Third war ===
Third Komenda War
- Part of Komenda Wars
Date	1698
Location	Eguafo and Komenda

Belligerents
Eguafo (some support by John Cabess)	Royal African Company, Takyi Kuma (Prince of Eguafo), Asebu (Akan kingdom), Cabess Terra (Akan kingdom), and Akani (Akan kingdom)

The Dutch began soliciting the other African parties to try and organize another force against Eguafo and Takyi's regime. On August 5, 1697, the Dutch and Fante made an agreement to attack Eguafo in exchange for significant gold given to Fante. The English were able to make an offer to Fante of an equal amount in order to keep them neutral and Fante accepted. Other Dutch efforts were largely rebuffed by the allies. In early 1698 the English and Dutch reached an agreement for mutual recognition to trade rights and the maintenance of forts in Komenda.

By November 1698, the English came to view that Takyi was becoming more inline with Dutch interests and so began to support Takyi Kuma. In November 1698, the English led an attack which killed Takyi as part of this attempt to put Takyi Kuma on the throne. The English paid for mercenaries from Asebu, Cabess Terra, and Akani to join the conflict. In contrast, the Dutch, Fante and Denkyira remained largely neutral in the war. The combined forces of Takyi Kuma moved upon Eguafo but were routed by the forces of the kingdom.

=== Fourth war ===
Fourth Komenda War
- Part of Komenda Wars
Date	1699-1700
Location	Eguafo and Komenda

Belligerents
Eguafo (partial support from the Dutch West India Company and Adom)	Takyi Kuma (Prince of Eguafo), Royal African Company, Twifo (Akan kingdom), and John Cabess

The fourth war began in November 1699 with a unified force supporting Takyi Kuma beginning hostilities in the region. Panyarring became a large scale process between the different forces and heightened tensions. In early 1700, individual merchants associated with Twifo and John Cabess were panyarred by Adom, possibly on the instructions of the Dutch. Violence remained sporadic with regular seizing of individuals of rival forces until the British-supported mercenary force moved upon Eguafo and on May 9, 1700, Takyi Kuma was named the new king of Eguafo.

== Legacy ==
The primary legacy in the area was a transformation of which European power controlled trade along the Gold Coast. While little territory changed hands between the Dutch and English companies, or the African polities, the English ended with the primary advantage in trade power along the coast. However, they quickly alienated the new king Takyi Kuma by demanding repayment of debts. In addition, the English position was undermined in 1704 when the death of Takyi Kuma resulted in civil war in Eguafo. Secondarily, the wars and a smallpox outbreak in the early 1700s led to significant depopulation of the coastal area. The wars also begun warfare practices which would become more regular throughout the rest of the 1700s including the use of mercenaries and panyarring. The chaos eventually allowed expansion of the Ashanti Empire in the region and the replacement of the gold trade with the slave trade.

== See also ==
- Anglo-Dutch Wars
- Gold Coast
- Anglo-Ashanti wars
- Range war
- African Company of Merchants
- Elmina
