= Komenda Sugar Factory =

Ghanaian food manufacturer

- Type: Public
- Industry: Sugar industry
- Founded: Founded in 1964
- Headquarters: Komenda Cape Coast, Central Region, Ghana
- Products: Sugar

Komenda Sugar Development Company Limited (also known as Komenda Sugar Factory) is a Ghanaian factory established in 1964 and its operations ground to a halt in the early 1990s. This was due to poor management and technical issues.

In 2016, Government secured a $35 million developmental aid from the Indian government, followed by an additional $24 million investment to revamp the operations of the sugar factory.

== Establishment ==
The Komenda Sugar Factory was established in 1964.

== Revival ==
The sugar factory collapsed and it was inaugurated by the erstwhile John Mahama government in 2016. This was made possible by a developmental grant facility of 35 million dollars from the Indian government.

Recently, the Ministry of Trade, Agribusiness and Industry has announced plans to operationalize the Komenda Sugar Factory by the end of 2026. The Ministry confirmed that land has been successfully acquired for the cultivation of sugarcane, which will supply raw materials for the factory. Established in 1964, the Komenda Sugar Factory has faced persistent challenges over the years, including technical difficulties that led to its shutdown. The facility has remained dormant since then.

In early August, the Ministry inaugurated an Interim Management Committee to assess the factory’s assets, review its financial and business viability, and evaluate the sugarcane supply chain.

== Disconnection ==
The Trade Minister, Elizabeth Ofosu-Adjare, has disclosed that the Komenda Sugar Factory has been disconnected from power and water supply over unpaid bills. This revelation was made on the floor of Parliament on Tuesday, 17 February 2026 as she provided an update on the state of the Komenda Sugar Factory.

She is noted to have said, "Technical and operational deficiencies have prevented the factory from running at full capacity. The machinery and equipment of the factory have not been refurbished since construction in 2016. Equipment generators and motors need maintenance, and the boiler top coil needs replacement to bring the factory back to life."
