= Fort Komenda =

Ghanaian fort

- Part of British Gold Coast
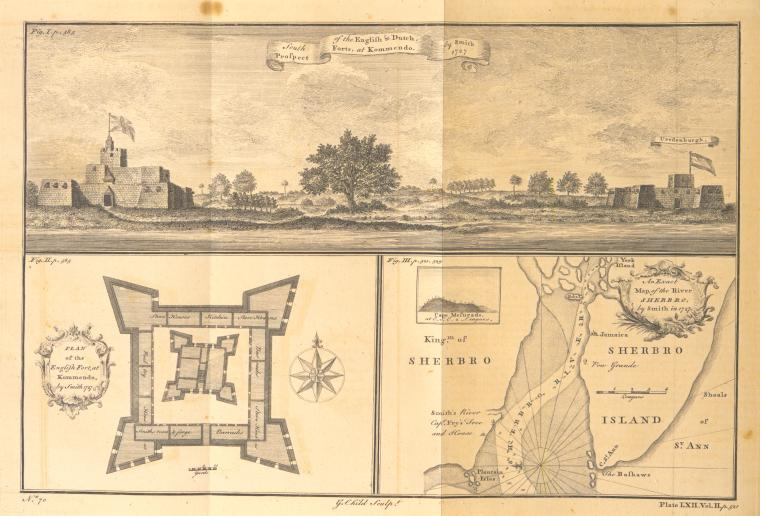
- British Fort Komenda (left) and Dutch Fort Vredenburgh (right). Note the peculiar architecture of Fort Komenda in the plan of the fort (lower left).

Location
- Coordinates: 5.050000°N 1.489444°W

Site history
- Built: 1682

Garrison information
- Occupants: Britain (1695-1868); Netherlands (1868-1872)

UNESCO World Heritage Site
- Part of: Forts and Castles, Volta, Greater Accra, Central and Western Regions
- Criteria: Cultural: (vi)
- Reference: 34
- Inscription: 1979 (3rd Session)

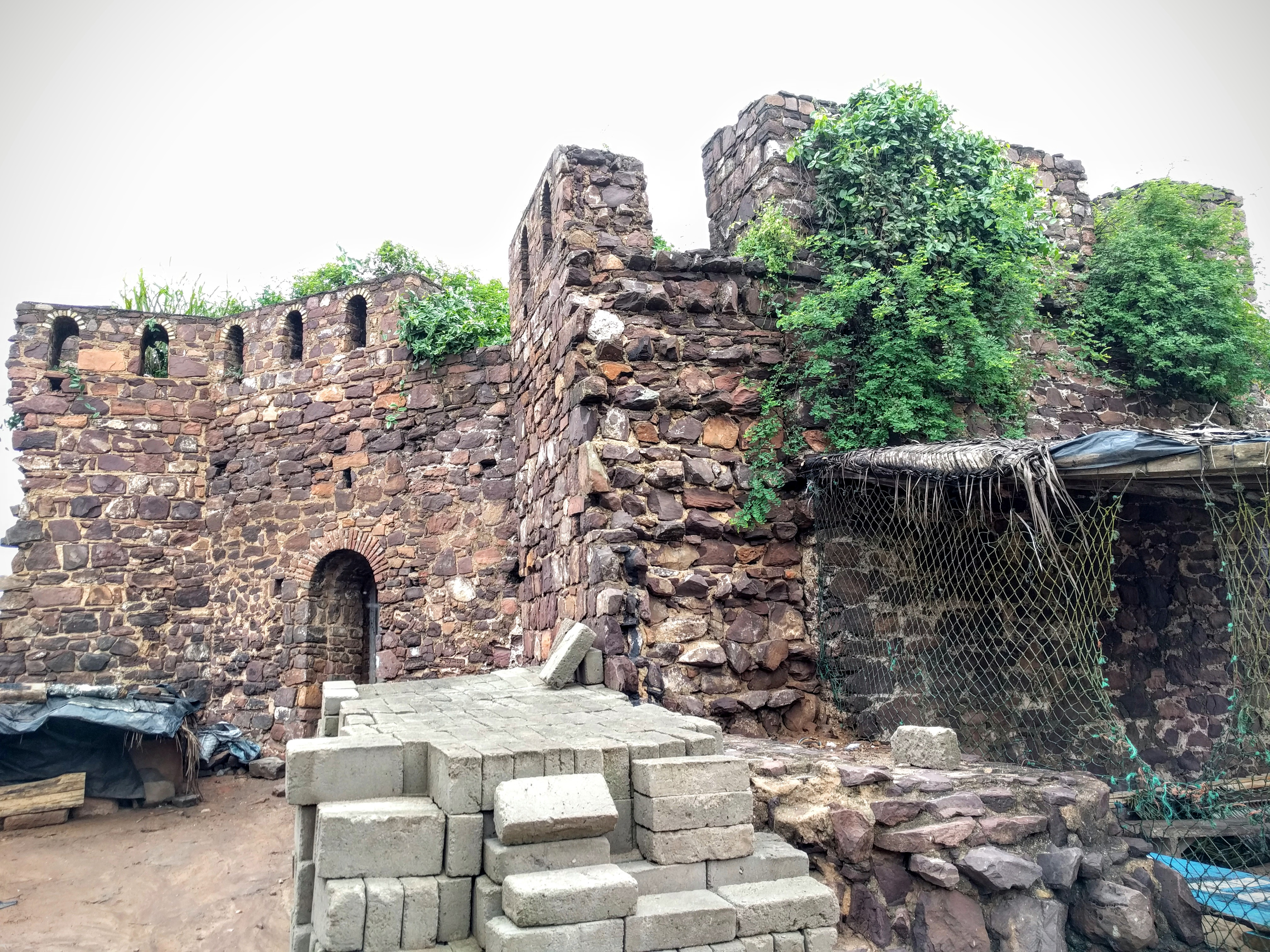
Fort Komenda

Fort Komenda was a British fort on the Gold Coast, currently preserved as a ruin. Because of its testimony to the Atlantic slave trade and European economic and colonial influence in West Africa, the fort was inscribed on the UNESCO World Heritage List in 1979, along with several other castles and forts in Ghana.

== History ==
Fort Komenda was established between 1695 and 1698 at Komenda, in contemporary Ghana. The fort had a very peculiar architecture, as this four-bastioned structure was built around an earlier four-bastioned English trading post, built in 1633. Fort Komenda was within cannon-shot distance to the Dutch Fort Vredenburgh. It was abandoned in 1816, after the abolition of slave trade.

The ruin of the fort was transferred to the Dutch as part of a large trade of forts between Britain and the Netherlands in 1868. When a Dutch navy ship entered the harbour of Komenda, however, the local population resisted the transfer of the fort to the Dutch. Through the use of force, Dutch rule was eventually established. Between December 1869 and January 1870, a military expedition was sent to the local capital of Kwassie-Krom. A deadly battle ensued, but the Dutch managed to emerge as victors. It was a Pyrrhic victory, however, as the ongoing problems with the local population meant that on 6 April 1872, the entire Dutch Gold Coast, was again transferred to the United Kingdom, as per the Gold Coast treaty of 1871.

== Gallery ==
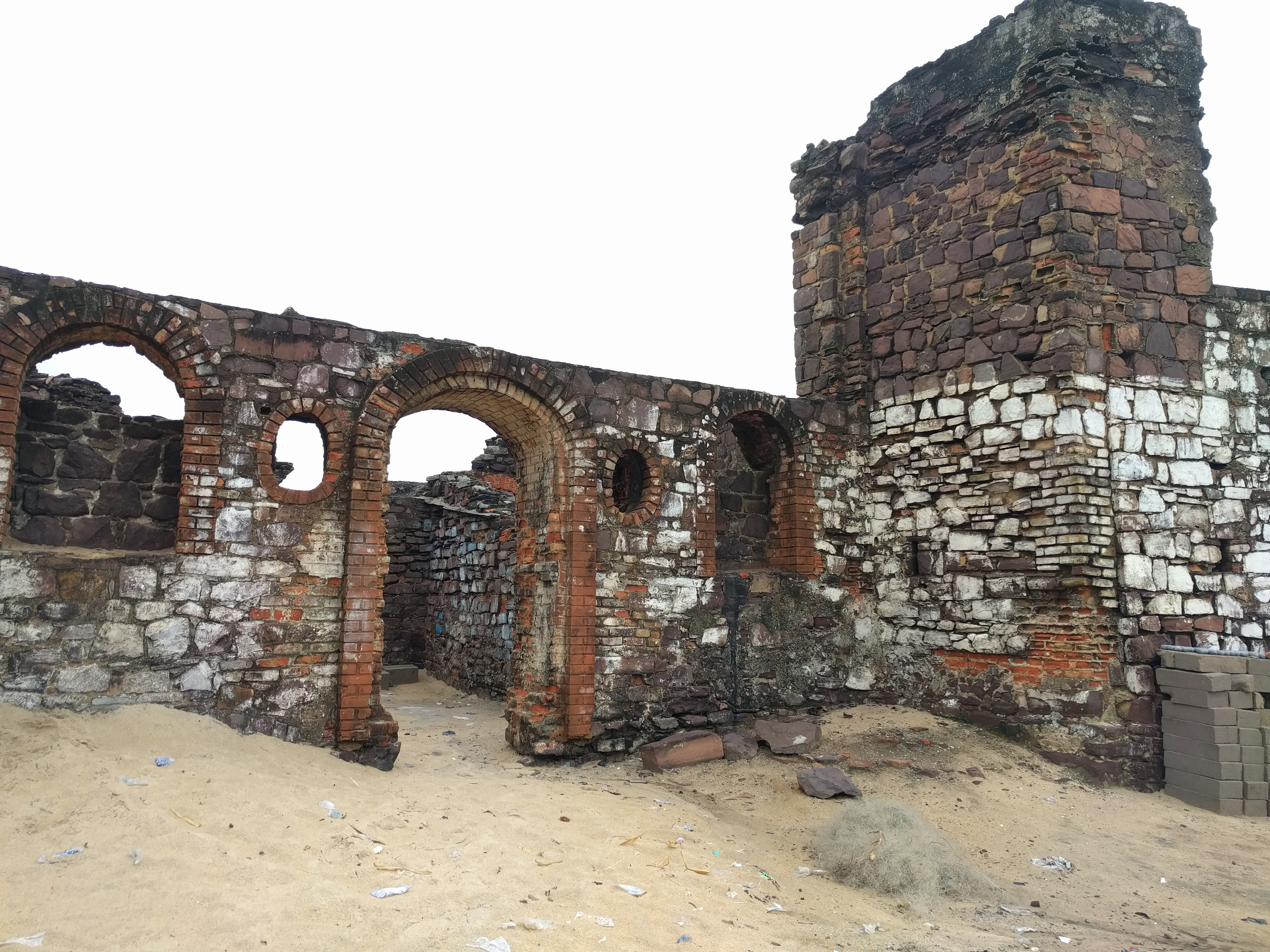
The ruins of Fort Komenda found in British Komenda in the Central Region

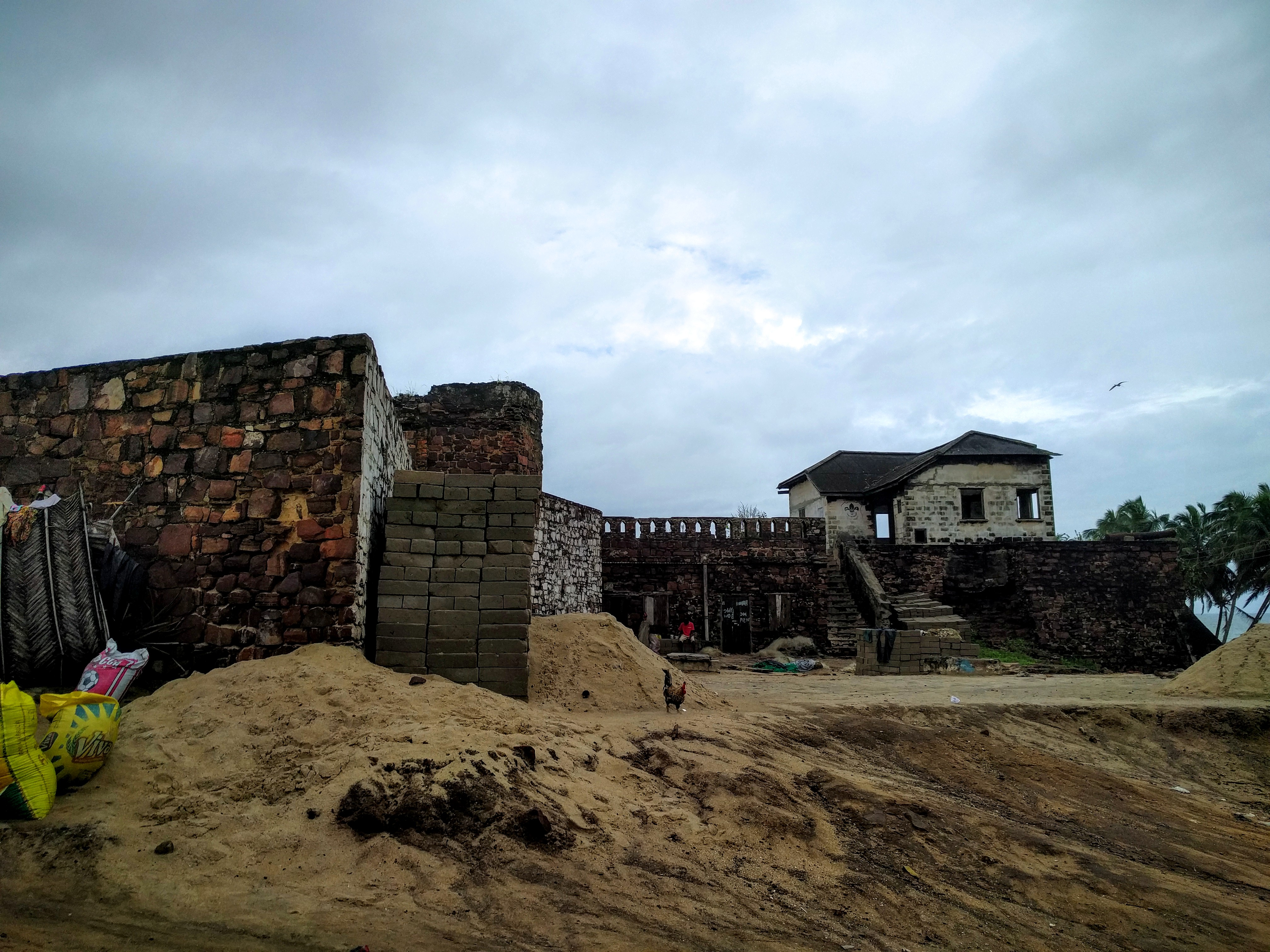

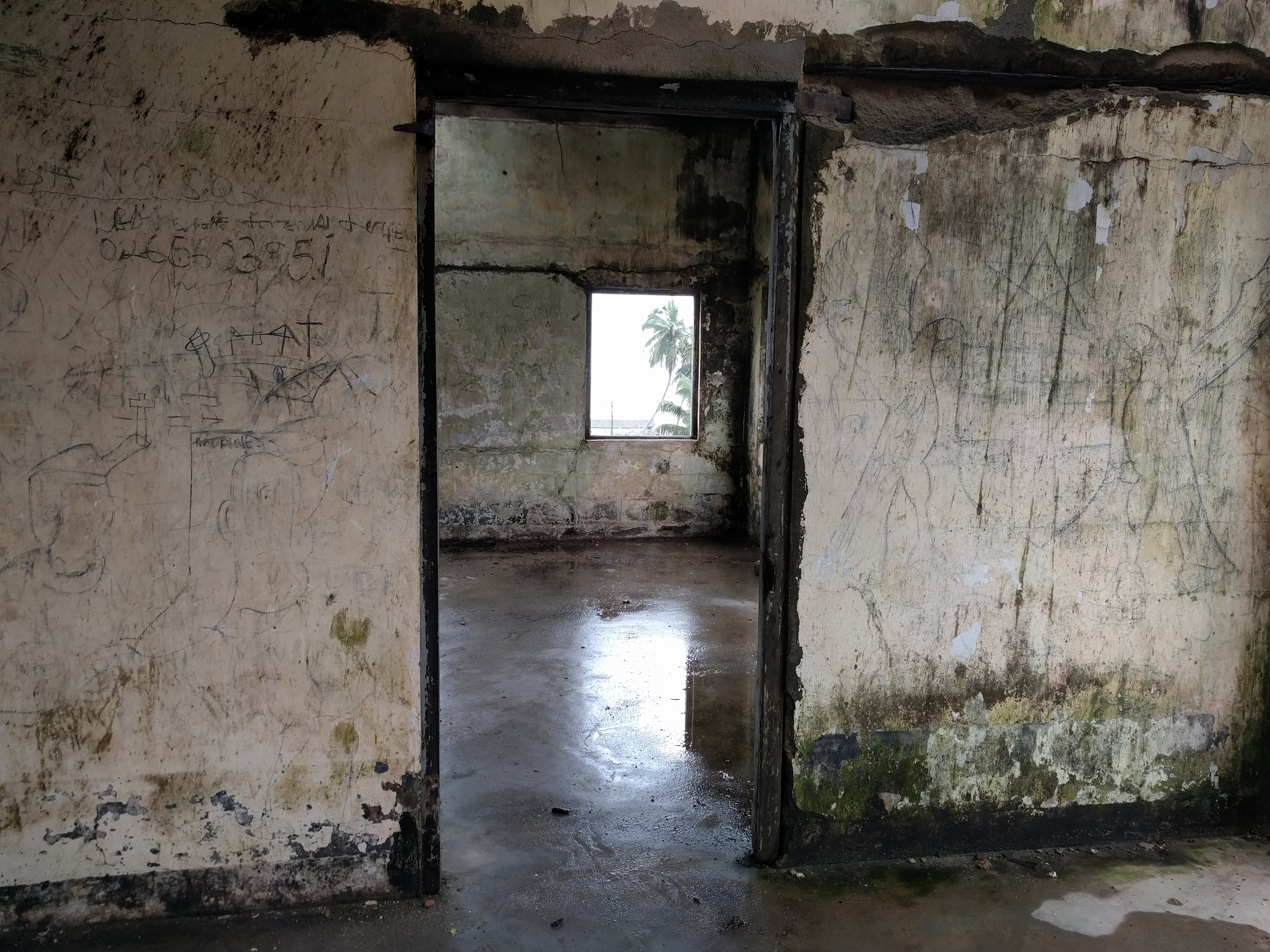

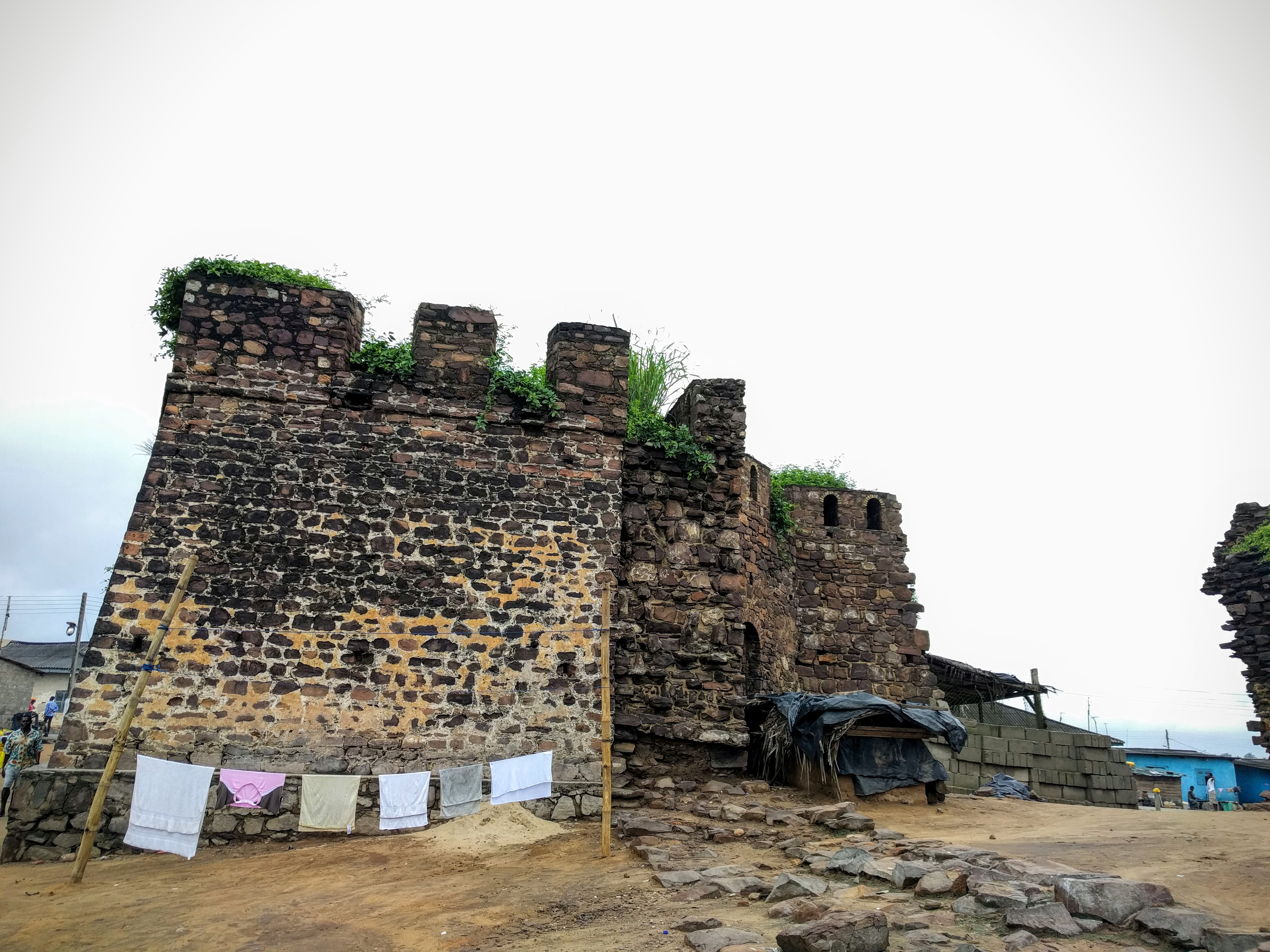

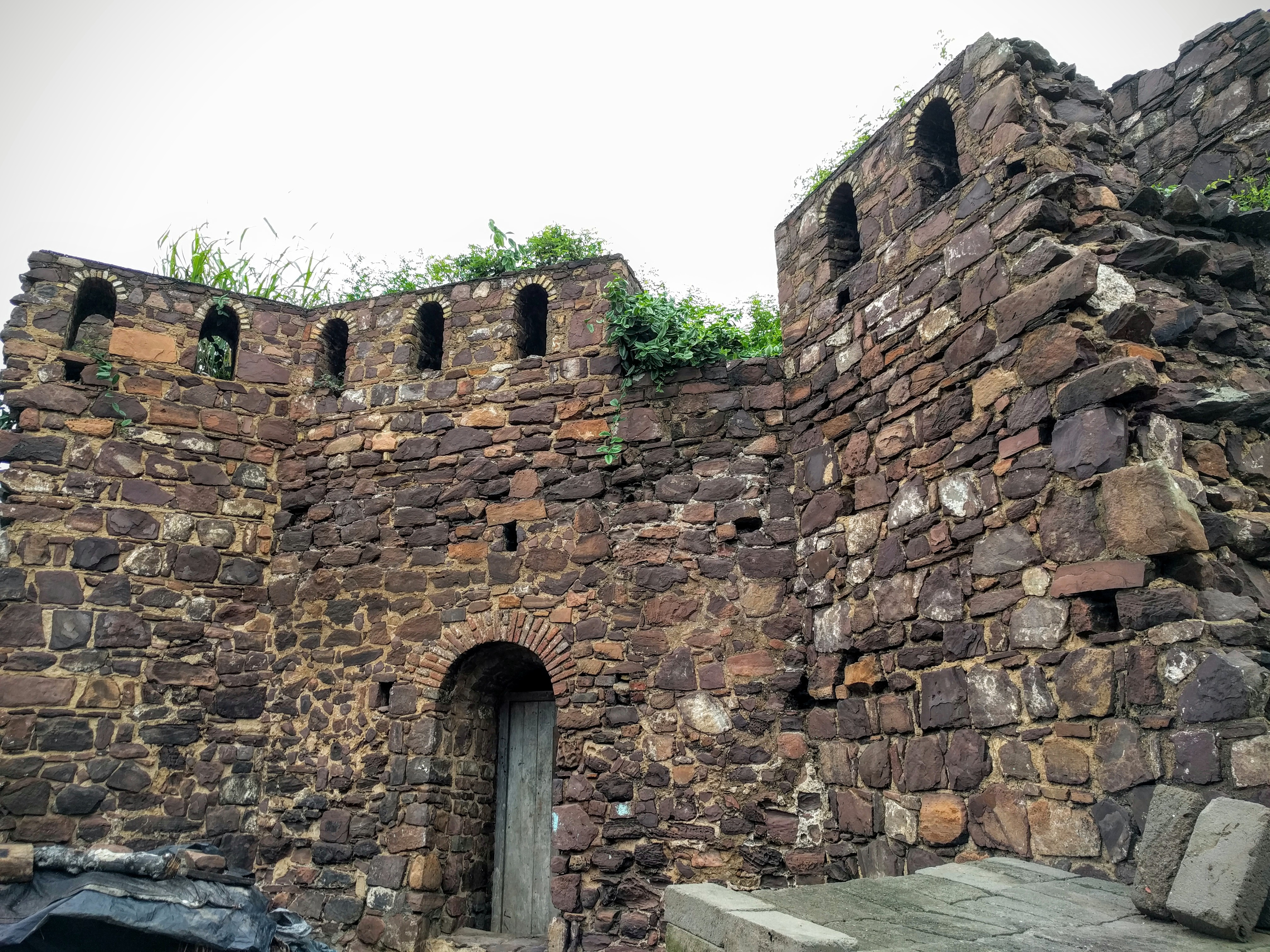

== See also ==
- Komenda Wars
- John Cabess
