= Panyarring =

Holding of a person until resolution of a debt or dispute

Panyarring was the practice of seizing and holding persons until the repayment of debt or resolution of a dispute which became a common activity along the Atlantic coast of Africa in the 18th and 19th centuries. The practice developed from pawnship, a common practice in West Africa where members of a family borrowing money would be pledged as collateral to the family providing credit until the repayment of the debt. Panyarring though is different from this practice as it involves the forced seizure of persons when a debt was not repaid.

When the Atlantic slave trade came to be a prominent economic force along the Atlantic coast, panyarring became a means for securing additional persons to trade, disrupting the trade of rivals, in some instances of protecting members of a person's family from being taken in the slave trade, and a political and economic tool used by European forces.

The practice was banned by a number of African kingdoms, notably by the Ashanti Empire in 1838. The British took a strong stance against panyarring when they established their administration on the coast and banned the practice in 1903. The prominence of the activity decreased and it has not been widely used in West Africa since that time. Pawnship was a form of slavery.

== Origins ==
=== Pawnship ===
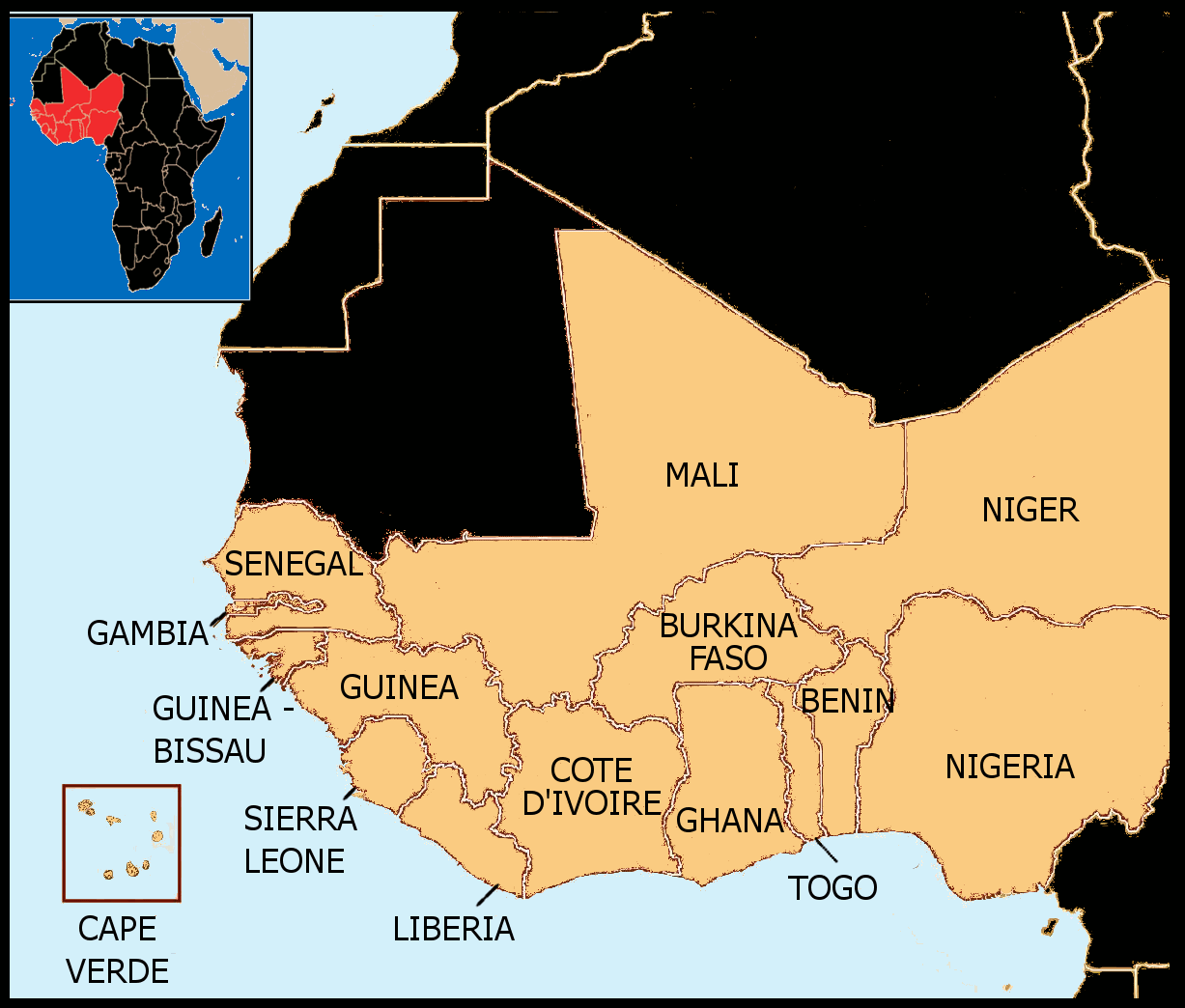
Map of Modern West Africa

Pawnship was a common form of collateral in West Africa, which involved the pledge of a person (or a member of the person's family) to service to a person providing credit. Pawnship was related but distinct from slavery in that the arrangement could include limited, specific terms of services to be provided and because kinship ties would protect the person from being sold into slavery. Pawnship was a common practice prior to European contact throughout West Africa, including amongst the Akan people, the Ewe people, the Ga people, the Yoruba people, and the Edo people (in modified forms, it also existed amongst the Efik people, the Igbo people, the Ijaw people, and the Fon people).

=== Practice ===
Panyarring is a Term used for Man-Stealing along the whole Coast. Here it is used also for stealing anything else; and, by Custom, (their Law,) every man has a Right to seize of another, at any Conveniency, so much as he can prove himself afterwards at that Palaver court to have been defrauded of, by any body in the same place he was Cheated... If any of our Ships of Liverpool or Bristol play tricks...the Friends and Relations never Fail, with the First opportunity to revenge it. They... panyarr the Boats' Crew who trust themselves foolishly on Shore; and now and then, by dissembling a friendship, have come on Board, Surprised and Murdered a Whole Ship's Company

— John Atkins, Voyage to Guinea, Brazil, and the West Indies 1737.

In contrast to pawnship, panyarring involved the arbitrary seizure of persons in order to force repayment for a debt or to recoup the loss by selling the person into slavery. Panyarring was one of many forms of debt repayment in the region, but was one of the most extreme forms of forcing repayment. Panyarring could include the person who was provided credit, a member of that person's family, or even a member of the community or a trade associate of that person (as a result of the belief in collective responsibility for debts). In addition to forcing debt repayment, panyarring could also be used to force a person to a palver or palaver, a court-like process for repayment of loss. Evidence of panyarring prior to European contact is scant and not well documented, and it is generally believed to have been rarely used.

=== Etymology ===
The root of the word is based on the Portuguese words penhóràr (to distrain or to seize) and penhór (a surety or a pawn). When the Portuguese came to the Gold Coast in the 16th century, they used the word penhóràr to describe the local practice among the Akan people of pawnship. Gradually, the word became commonly used by Europeans to describe the practice of seizing a person for repayment of debt or to remedy an injury along the whole coast of Africa.

== History ==
Panyarring became a large-scale activity in West Africa largely with the increase in the Atlantic slave trade. The lengthy trade networks from hundreds of miles inland to the coast required similarly complex forms of credit relationships and pawnship was used extensively by both Africans and European traders. However, it had different system and structure in each different area along the Atlantic coast.

=== Gold Coast ===
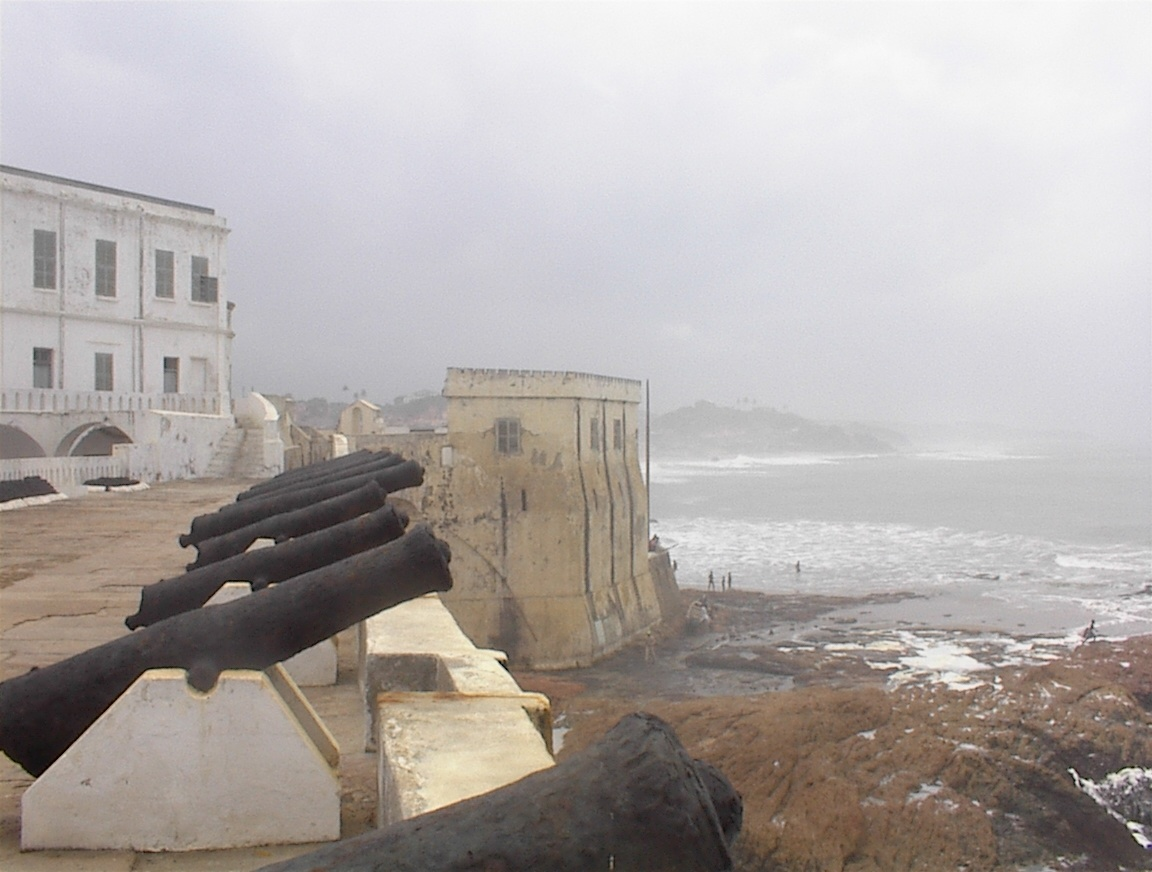
Cape Coast Slave Castle, the main British fort in the Gold Coast for the slave trade.

Along the Gold Coast, in present-day Ghana, panyarring became a tool used in the slave trade and in the contest between the Dutch, British, and other European powers for trade along the coast. Politically, in the 18th century, that area of Africa was populated by a number of fragmented Akan polities without an organized central power. With the increase of slave trading, panyarring became a means of seizing persons, sometimes regardless of whether there was a pre-existing loan agreement and holding them hostage, selling them into slavery, or simply seizing their goods. It also regulated relationships between the different communities by bringing persons to palaver courts for settlement in front of a judge.

Panyarring became a means of securing people for sale into the Atlantic slave trade. Debts could be real or invented, persons would be seized, and quickly sold to European slavers and transported before families of those persons seized could respond. In addition, slave traders operating away from the coast were sometimes panyarred before they could reach the port cities and all the slaves they were bringing to the ports would be seized and quickly sold.

In one case in 1773, an Obutong chief's sons who had been pawns in an arrangement were sold to a European slave ship. The chief, Robin John Ephraim, was left with little choice but to panyar the ships and release his sons and other members of his tribe seized for the slave trade.

Both Europeans and Africans began using panyarring as an extension of political and economic policies in the region and for a range of purported offenses. For example, in 1709 British slave traders were upset with an African slave trader who allegedly sold them a "mad" slave. When the dispute increased, the African slave traders panyarred the British captain and held him until both sides negotiated an outcome. Similarly, in 1797 Archibald Dalzel, the British governor of the Gold Coast, panyarred a Fante priest in Anomabo when members of the village had refused to repay debts to British officers because those officers had died. Dalzel held the priest at the Cape Coast Castle for a week until the chief of Anomabo agreed to repay the debts.

Europeans would use panyarring in order to secure food or goods when it seemed opportune. One British commander noted that whenever the English wanted any goat, sheep, or chicken, they would simply go into the town and take the animal. The owner would then come to the British fort and be paid for the animal, not always at the fair market rate.

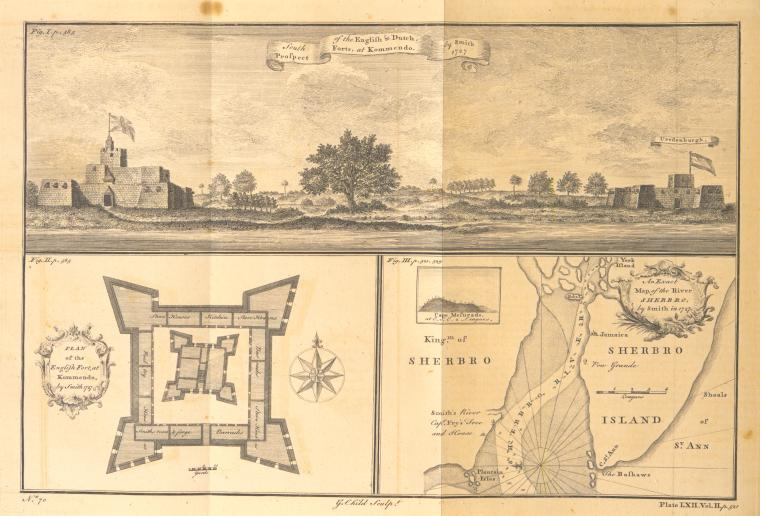
The neighboring British and Dutch forts at Komenda, the sites of numerous hostilities and significant panyarring.

The British and the Dutch incorporated panyarring into their competitive strategies with one another. African traders and merchants associated with the other power would be panyarred in order to disrupt the trade or attempt to change the allegiance of the trader. For example, in 1688 in the port of Komenda, the Dutch panyarred John Cabess, a powerful African trader loyal to the British, and although he was quickly released they kept all of the goods he had carried with him. This insult to Cabess may have been a prominent contributor to the attacks he launched against the Dutch starting the Komenda Wars (1694–1700), a conflict where the British, Dutch, and African parties used panyarring regularly as an extension of the attacks against other parties.

The active panyarring along the Gold Coast in the 17th and 18th centuries eventually resulted in a situation where communities were extremely vulnerable to its members being seized and sold in the slave trade or held for payment. Travel between communities became very dangerous and even working alone away from communities could make one vulnerable to seizure. Initially, communities adopted practices to try to protect themselves from panyarring practices with the creation of Asafo, military units which could provide travel protection or protection to communities.

As the Ashanti Empire rose to prominence and began consolidating authority it tried to end the practice of panyarring. King Kwaku Dua I Panyin banned the practice of panyarring around 1838. This prohibition required use of the military and administrative function of the Ashanti, and was continued until 1883 until the overthrow of Mensa Bonsu and chaos which followed. Panyarring then became an active means of securing repayment of debt and for political and economic ends again. In 1902, the British took over the Ashanti area and created the area of modern-day Ghana into a formal protectorate. One of the first achievements of the new administration was to end the practice of panyarring in the colony. They brought persons engaged in panyarring to court and punished them resulting in a large-scale end of the practice by 1903.

=== Yorùbáland ===
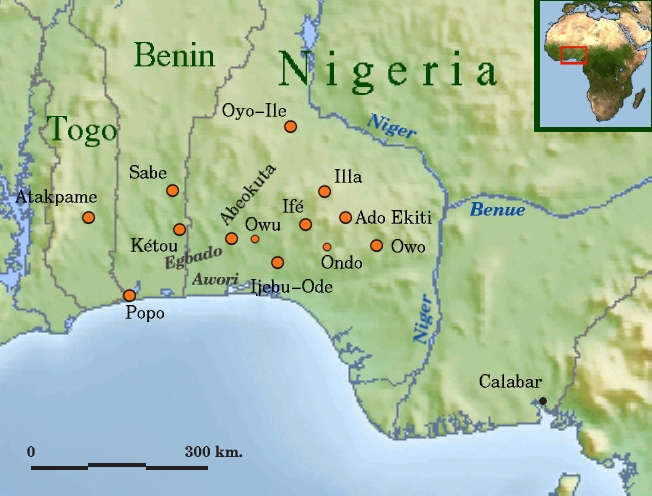
The main historical cities of the Yoruba coast with modern national boundaries.

Evidence of panyarring in Yorùbáland, in present-day Nigeria, before the 1830s is fairly limited. European traders were threatened with panyarring on occasions when disputes arose, but it did not reach the level it did along the Gold Coast. In the mid-19th century however, documentation shows a number of examples of panyarring occurring as a form of political struggle between the various tribes. Chiefs could allow panyarring within their territory, decide to use panyarring in rivalry with other chiefs, or agree to panyarring in exchange for money. Historian Olatunji Ojo has discovered a number of cases in Yorubaland of such activities, including, in 1879, the deputy king of a city called Itebu who panyarred a Mahi man in exchange for a small fee from another Mahi man who accused the first of adultery with one of his wives. Similarly, an Egba chief once panyarred members of an Awori tribe which had panyarred a young girl in his village.

Panyarring thus was a prime cause of deteriorating relations between different Yoruba chiefs, causing significant periods of tensions between different groups and directly causing the Ondo-Ikale war of 1891. With British expansion in the 1880s and 1890s, panyarring decreased in importance throughout Yorubaland.

=== Dahomey ===
The Kingdom of Dahomey, along the coast in present-day Benin, took over the kingdoms of Allada and Whydah in the 1720s and established control over part of the Atlantic coast and became one of the main participants in the slave trade. Allada and Whydah had been prominent users of panyarring for much of their contact with Europeans. The king of Allada, toward the end of the 17th century, was recorded as threatening local traders who were in default on loans that "all their wives would be taken." Similarly, Whydah was known for being particularly hard on debtors because it allowed panyarring of persons or goods whenever loans were not paid.^{pg. 75}

Dahomey had banned the practice of panyarring in the early 17th century under King Houegbadja, requiring that all debt disputes be handled in royal courts. When Dahomey conquered Allada and Whydah the practice was banned. Although the kingdom was known for its militarism and slave raids, Dahomey did not use panyarring and the practice was not prominent along what was known as the Slave Coast in the 18th and 19th centuries.

=== Elsewhere ===
Panyarring has been described in some form during the 18th and 19th centuries from present-day Sierra Leone to Angola along the coast of Africa. Other than the Gold Coast or Yorubaland, panyarring never reached significant levels. Lovejoy and Richardson claim that the prevalence of panyarring is largely related to the structure and ability for debt repayment through authorized channels. When credit and debt relationships lack structure, pawnship and panyarring became prominent.

However, panyarring did still affect trade relationships throughout the coast at a number of points. The most prominent was the Bimbia affair. In 1788, a British trader bought 30 persons held in pawnship in Bimbia, in present-day Cameroon, for transport to the Americas. Among those included were the sons and daughters of the king of Bimbia who gathered significant slaves and ivory to pay for their release, but the British captain would not release them and sailed away. As a result, the locals panyarred two other British ships in retaliation until a Dutch ship captured the British ship and returned to Bimbia with the persons held on the ship. Throughout the coast, Europeans and Africans participated in panyarring more rarely until it became nonexistent in the early 20th century.

== See also ==
- Slavery in Africa
- Debt Bondage
