= Mary Carver Affair =

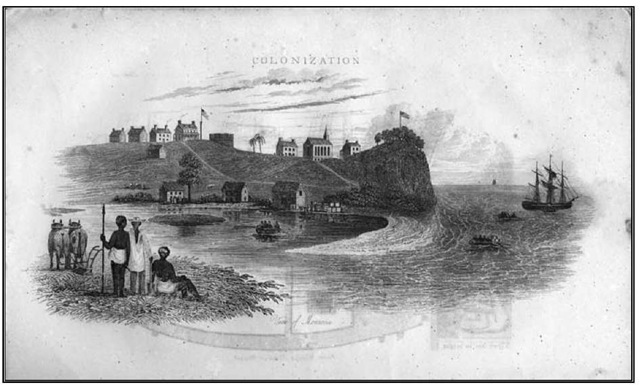
- An American ship and African warriors at Monrovia, Liberia in 1842.
Date	April 24, 1842; 184 years ago
Location	Little Bereby, Côte d'Ivoire
Result	Ivorian victory: Americans massacred and ship captured; Ivory Coast Expedition

Belligerents
United States	(Ivory Coast) Bereby

Commanders and leaders
(United States) Eben Farwell †	(Ivory Coast) Ben Crack-O

Strength
1 schooner	unknown

Casualties and losses
5 killed 1 schooner captured	unknown

The Mary Carver Affair occurred in April 1842 when the American merchant ship Mary Carver was attacked by Bereby warriors in canoes near the kraal of Little Bereby Ivory Coast. After the crew was massacred, the natives plundered the ship, provoking a response by warships of the United States Navy's African Slave Trade Patrol.

== Affair ==
It was April 24 when the affair unfolded. Captain Eben Farwell commanded the small schooner Mary Carver and he was at the port of Little Bereby to pick up a 600-pound load of camwood from a Bereby trader named Young Crack-O. However, Captain Farwell discovered that his wood was not ready for shipment and demanded that Cracow give him a canoe as payment. The trader reluctantly agreed and when the shipment was ready for transportation, it was taken to the Mary Carver by canoe. The ship's mate did not suspect danger so he allowed some of the canoemen to board the schooner and help with stowing the cargo. But instead of helping load the camwood, the Africans attacked with concealed weapons. The mate and the ship's cook were killed and one seaman was thrown overboard and drowned. A second seaman climbed the rigging to escape the massacre and when he finally came down he was "butchered" by the Bereby. Captain Farwell did not know his ship was under attack until the natives came for him, he asked the Africans to allow him to say one last prayer but his request was denied.

Women were among the attackers, one of them hit Farwell in the face with and broke the bone above his right eye socket, making his eye bulge out. After that Farwell was tied up and thrown overboard; in the water he was able to free himself of the ropes and he made it to the surface only to be clubbed in the head again and killed. The Mary Carver was then plundered, some pieces of the vessel were taken along with her American flag which ended up in the home of Chief Ben Crack-O in Little Bereby. The Episcopal missionary E. L. Minor was working in the town of Taboo, thirty miles from Little Bereby, and he informed the United States Secretary of the Navy Abel P. Upshur of the affair in a letter. Minor's letter also suggested that military action take place in order to prevent the Africans from attacking American and European shipping. After the Edward Barley Incident, later that year, the United States Congress approved a punitive expedition to the area under Commodore Matthew C. Perry, which destroyed Little Bereby.

== See also ==
- Blockade of Africa
- Santo Domingo Affair
- General Sherman Incident
- Rover Incident
- Rio de Janeiro Affair
