= Willem Bosman =

Dutch merchant (1672 – after 1703)

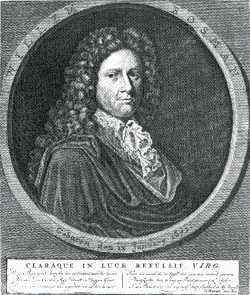
Portrait of Willem Bosman (1704).

Willem Bosman (12 January 1672 – after 1703) was a merchant in the service of the Dutch West India Company, spending most of his time in the Dutch Gold Coast.

Bosman was born in Utrecht. Although he sailed to the Gold Coast as an apprentice when he was only 16 years of age, he managed to climb the ranks and eventually became head merchant (Dutch: opperkoopman). In 1702, he sailed back to the Dutch Republic, and little is known of his later life.

Bosman is best known for his description of the Gold Coast that was titled Nauwkeurige beschrijving van de Guinese Goud- Tand- en Slavekust ("An accurate description of the Guinean Gold, Ivory and Slave Coast"), published in 1704. This document remained the most authoritative description of the area for more than a century and provided significant detail of the Komenda Wars in which Bosman took part. He described in detail the functioning of the slave trade and commented of Fida that "markets of men are here kept in the same manner as those of beasts are with us". The book was a major source for Ghanaian historians in the twentieth century and a facsimile of the 1705 English translation was republished in 1907, at the instigation of the colonialist Alfred Lewis Jones.

The Ghanaian surname Bossman is thought to originate from the children Bosman had with his black mistresses.
