= John Cabess =

African merchant

- Born: 1640s or 1650s
- Died: 1722; Komenda
- Other names: John Kabes or John Cabes
- Occupation: Prominent merchant in Komenda

John Cabess (also written as John Kabes or John Cabes) (c. 1640s – 1722) was a prominent African trader in the port city of Komenda, part of the Eguafo Kingdom, in modern-day Ghana. He was a major British ally and was a supplier to the British Royal African Company. As a trader, he became a strong economic and political force in the coastal region in the early 1700s, playing an active role in the Komenda Wars, the rise of the Ashanti Empire, the expansion of British involvement in West Africa, and the beginnings of large-scale Atlantic slave trade. Because of his combined economic and political power, historian Kwame Daaku named Cabess one of the "merchant princes" of the Gold Coast in the 1700s. He died in 1722, but his heirs continued to exert economic power in the port for the remainder of the 18th century.

== Background ==
John Cabess was born sometime in the 1640s or 1650s. It is believed that he was the son of John Cabessa, who had been a prominent African official working for the British at Fort Amsterdam in the 1660s. The older Cabessa was most noted in British reports for committing suicide rather than become a captive while the Dutch were attacking Fort Amsterdam. The city of Komenda, part of the Kingdom of Eguafo, had become a major trade port in the later parts of the 17th century. The British and French wanted to get a foothold in the port in order to break the Dutch monopoly over trade in the Gold Coast. The Dutch, in contrast simply saw it as a secondary port to support its other operations in the area. In this situation, Cabess moved to Komenda in the 1670s to work with the British attempts to establish trade relationships in the port. The primary African merchant to the British in the port was a trader named Captain Bracon in the 1670s; however, by 1686, Cabess had taken over this position.

== Merchant Prince at Komenda ==
By the 1680s, Cabess had established himself as a key merchant in Komenda. Henige speculates that Cabess came to Komenda between 1683 and 1685. A British trader emphasized his control over trade and relations in the port by exclaiming that without Cabess in Komenda "nothing will be done." At this point, he provided shells, food, and manpower for fort and factory construction by the Royal African Company in Komenda and elsewhere along the coast. Eventually, Cabess became a major slave trader out of the port of Komenda supplying thousands of slaves on a continual basis.

His refusal to trade with the Dutch significantly slowed their ability to build facilities and when the French took an interest in developing a factory at Komenda they offered Cabess a significant amount of gold to help them in the project (a deal which was never finalized). Cabess had significant negotiating leverage in his relationship with the British which sometimes resulted in tense relations. In 1687, tensions between Cabess and the Royal African Company representative in the fort, William Cross, resulted in Cross being forcibly removed from the post. Similar situations occurred in 1698 and 1714, both times with the British representative being replaced at the request of Cabess.

In 1688, Cabess was panyarred by the Dutch, a practice common in the area where merchants and traders would be captured by other merchant forces and their goods would be taken. The British merchants secured Cabess' release and according to some accounts this is what precipitated his attack on Dutch miners in 1694 which started the Komenda Wars. In 1690 during a war between the Dutch and French trading companies, the British factory was burnt down and they left the area. Cabess therefore began supplying goods and manpower to the Dutch.

During the Komenda Wars (1694–1700), Cabess provided crucial assistance to the British position and actively supported their return to Komenda. In 1694 and 1695, Cabess attacked the Dutch fort on multiple occasions and during negotiations with the Dutch commander, Willem Bosman, the Dutch commander attempted to shoot Cabess but missed. With the end of the wars after 1700 and the rise of the Ashanti Empire in trade along the coast, Cabess became a crucial middleman in the port city. British traders complained that Cabess would prevent traders from directly entering Komenda and instead intercept them outside of the city trading for their goods and then charging a higher rate to the British, while keeping some of the best goods for himself. Cabess then became a monopsonist and monopolist able to manage contacts with multiple sellers and multiple buyers but keeping them from directly contacting each other and thus centralizing buying and selling within his control.

The economic position of Cabess brought him into conflict with the British in the early 1700s with him and the British commander at the fort, Dalby Thomas, becoming quite hostile to one another by 1705. However, although he traded with the Dutch, he remained a significant British ally for the rest of his life and the tension quickly decreased. This economic position also introduce rivalries with other African powers: a series of hostile activities between Twifo and Cabess in 1714 required the adjudication of Ashanti diplomats.

Economic importance translated into increasing political importance and Cabess became the virtual leader of Komenda, which began to be less a subordinate to the city of Eguafo and gradually became an equal. In addition, Cabess begun owning significant land around Komenda that he directly controlled. Originally, he controlled a few huts around the British fort, but by 1714 this included a sizable area. At the time of his death, he largely held sovereign power along the coast and had become the possessor of his own stool (a symbol of leadership among the Akan people), which would later be passed to his descendants.

== Death ==
Cabess died in June 1722 in Komenda. The British and Dutch feared a large succession struggle by the many heirs of Cabess. The RAC administrators dispatched an officer to provide gifts to those members most likely to take the place of Cabess. His body was buried at the British fort in Komenda after a public viewing of his body. His son Ahenaqua took over much of the trade and political power of Cabess, without a recorded succession struggle, and until the chiefs at Cape Coast became predominant over Komenda in the mid-1700s, the main official at Komenda, the Caboceer, governed on what was known as "the stool of the late John Cabess."

== See also ==
- Atlantic slave trade
- Anglo-Ashanti wars
- History of Ghana
