= Central University (Ghana) =

Private university in Accra region, Ghana

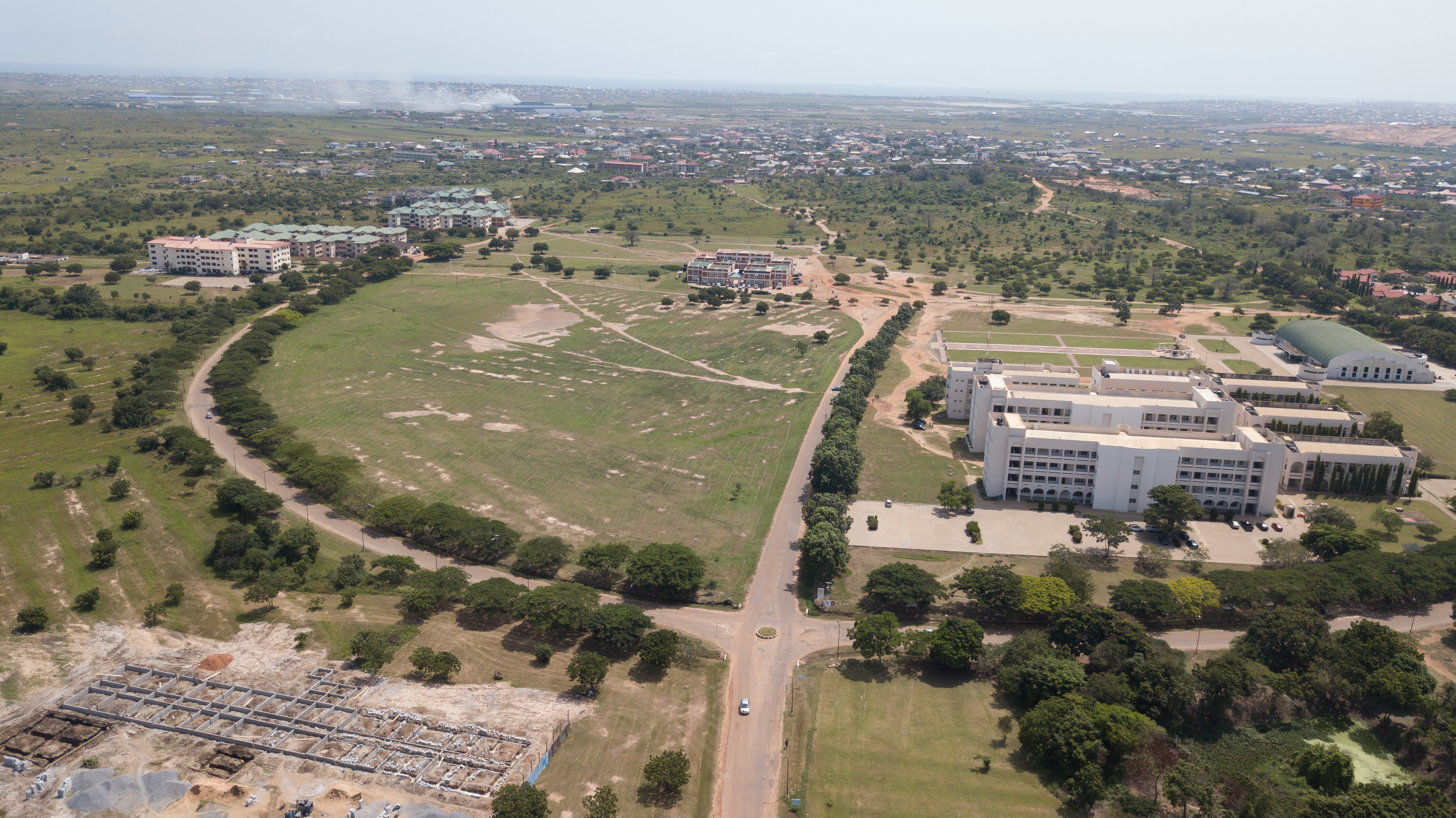
- Drone View of Central University Campus
- Motto: Faith, Integrity and Excellence
- Type: Private
- Established: 1998; 28 years ago
- Chancellor: Mensa Otabil
- Vice-Chancellor: Samuel Kwasi Dartey-Baah https://central.edu.gh/expand/5267/
- Faculty: 211
- Administrative staff: 185
- Undergraduates: 8400
- Location: Dawhenya, Greater Accra Region, Ghana; 5.5663°N 0.2410°W
- Campus: Urban area
- Website: www.central.edu.gh

The Central University is a private university in Ghana, founded by the International Central Gospel Church (ICGC). It was founded as a pastoral training institute by Mensah Otabil in 1988. In June 1991, it was known as the Central Bible College. It later became the Central Christian College in 1993 and eventually became the Central University College in 1998. In 2016, Central University College attained the status of a fully-fledged University thus now Central University. The stated aim of the university is to provide an "integrated and biblically-based tertiary education with particular reference to the needs of the African continent". It is currently the biggest private university in Ghana.

== History ==
In 1988, the Central Bible College was born. In 1993, it became the Christian University College and became the Central University College (CUC) in the year 1998 after a change of name.

Central University College (CUC) is a privately owned university college in Ghana. Owned by the International Central Gospel Church, its founder and chancellor, Rev. Dr. Mensa Otabil has within the last two decades, emerged as a leading voice in African Christianity advocating for a proper synthesis of Christian religious expression and the translation of spirituality into practical everyday action. The Idea of CUC was birthed in 1988.

CUC started as a short-term pastoral training institute mainly for pastors of ICGC. It became a Christian University College in 1993 expanding its programs over the years to include the academic study of Christian Theology, business administration, economics, computer science and a select number of modern languages including French. Most of its current programs are offered up to the graduate level and has seen the establishment of the schools of architecture and pharmacy in the 2008/2009 academic year. In 1998, the university college was accredited by the (NAB). A Ghanaian newspaper feature on CUC that appeared in The Spectator of Saturday 16 October 2007 described CUC as "a University college in a class of its own". In January 2016, the University College received the long-awaited Presidential Charter to become an autonomous and a fully-fledged university as Central University.

CUC's continued development included the construction of a permanent campus in Miotso, near Dawhenya. On 26 October 2007 CUC relocated a greater part of its campus from the heart of Accra, the capital to Miotso a community near Dawhenya in the Greater Accra Region.

The university's first registrar, Johnson Kanda, was the first employee of the university, who drafted and put together almost all the documentation needed for the university; he served a period of 10 years between 1998 and 2008.

The university's chancellor Rev. Mensa Otabil is the Head Pastor of the International Central Gospel Church (ICGC) The university's past President V. P. Y. Gadzekpo, was the president from 2004 until 2012. He took over from Rev. Kingsley Larbi who was the principal of Central Christian College, Ghana. His distinguished pioneering efforts at the then Central Christian College led to the establishment of Central University College, Ghana, where he served as its first president or vice-chancellor from November 1998 until July 2003. The university was next headed by Kwesi Yankah. He took over from V. P. Y. Gadzekpo on 1 September 2012. He handed over to the current vice chancellor, Bill Buenar Puplampu.

The university received a charter from the president in 2016 and now has changed from a college to a university.

=== Milestones ===
- 1984 – The International Central Gospel Church [ICGC] is founded by Rev. Dr. Mensa Otabil
- 1988 – The ICGC opens a ministerial institute to train a new generation of leaders
- 1991 – Central Bible College is birthed from the success of the ICGC ministerial institute
- 1993 – Central Bible College is incorporated as the Central Christian College

1997

- Investiture of Rev. Dr. Mensa Otabil as chancellor
- Central Business School is commissioned

1998

- Central Bible College is re-christened Central University College to reflect its new status as a liberal arts tertiary institution
- Johnson Kanda is inducted as the first registrar
- Rev. Kingsley Larbi is appointed as the first principal

2002 The Business Development Centre opens for business

2003 Development Directorate is carved from the pre-existing Project Office

2004 V. P. Y. Gadzekpo takes office as the second president

2006 Faculty of Arts & Social Sciences is established

2007 Quality Assurance Unit is launched

Vision & Legacy Unit is established

2008 School of Applied Sciences is commissioned

2009 J. F. Odartey Blankson is appointed as the university's second registrar

Human Resources Directorate is created.

Centre for International Relations & Programmes is inaugurated

2011 School of Graduate Studies is established

William Ofori-Atta Institute of Integrity [WOAII] is instituted

The historic migration of the university from Mataheko to Miotso begins 2012

2012 Kwesi Yankah is appointed as the third president of the university

2013 Faculty of Law is inaugurated

Three lecture-series: Distinguished Speaker Series, Professorial Inaugural Lectures and Annual Colloquia are instituted.

CU's Schools and Faculties commence the first Annual Colloquia Series

Adigun Agbaje begins the Distinguished Speaker Series with the topic "Electoral Politics and the Travails of Democracy" in Africa.

2014

- The second and third lectures of the Distinguished Speakers Series are delivered by Mahamudu Bawumia and Kwesi Botchwey on the respective topics: "Restoring the Value of the Cedi" and "The State of the Nation's Political Economy".
- The first Professorial Inaugural Lecture is given by Kwaku Appiah-Adu on the topic "A Framework for Oil & Gas Development in Ghana".
- The university receives the Socrates Award [Oxford] for Best University & Best Manager

2015

- The Head of State Awards for Academic Excellence [Tertiary] is conferred on the university.

2016

- The university is awarded a Presidential Charter as a fully-fledged university.
- The vice-chancellor of the university, Kwesi Yankah, is awarded Laureate for Education in Ghana by Impact Africa Summit.

2017

- Bill Buenar Puplampu is appointed Ag. Vice Chancellor.
- School of Pharmacy, School of Architecture and Design and the School of Medicine and Health Sciences are established.

2019

- The school began the use of solar energy to reduce the costs of electricity.

2021

- The university awarded its first honorary Doctoral degrees (Honoris Causa) to three former members of the University Council.

== Organisation ==
The university has nine schools and two faculties

=== Faculty of Law ===
This is the newest school established at the Miotso campus.

- Bachelor of Laws (LL.B)

=== School of Theology and Missions ===
The oldest of the schools, it was started in 1988 as a pastoral training institute thus predating the university.

- Department of Biblical and Theological Studies
- Department of Historical Theology
- Department of Practical Theology

=== Central Business School ===
This school was established in 1997.

- Department of Accounting
- Department of Finance
- Department of Agribusiness Management
- Department of Management and Public Administration
- Department of Human Resource Management
- Department of Marketing

=== School of Applied Sciences ===
This is located on the Miosto campus.

- Department of Architecture
- Department of Civil Engineering
- Department of Natural Sciences
- Department of Nursing Studies and Practice
- Department of Pharmaceutical Sciences
- Department of Physician Assistantship Studies

=== Faculty of Arts and Social Sciences ===
This is the third school created. It is located on the Dawhenya campus. It was established in October 2006)

- Department of Communication Studies
- Department of Environment and Development Studies
- Department of English Language
- Department of Economics
- Department of French
- Department of Psychology
- Department of Sociology
- Department of social Works

=== School of Graduate Studies and Research ===
- Master of Business Administration programme with a duration of 18 calendar months. Designed to provide an intensive quality post-graduate education in business and management within a supportive collaborative environment. An intensive foreign language training programme (French and Chinese) as well as a Personal Professional Development Programme of study is

== Campuses ==
The university occupies the following campus locations

=== Miotso (permanent campus) ===
This consists of expanding number of structures on the 248-acre (1.00 km^{2}) plot of land. It houses the new 'face' of CU. Miotso is 58.2 km away from Accra Central. This permanent campus accommodates the Central Business School, the School of Applied Sciences, the Faculty of Law and The faculty of art and social science. Also the administration section of the University College is also located there.

=== Mataheko Campus ===
The Mataheko campus is located in the heart of Accra near Kaneshie. The university has four campuses located within the Mataheko area for lecture halls and administrative offices. These campuses serve also the Central Business School and Administration and the Faculty of Arts and Social Sciences.

=== Christ Temple Graduate School Campus ===
This campus houses the Graduate School of Business which runs the Master of Business Administration programme with duration of eighteen calendar months. Designed to provide an intensive quality post-graduate education in business and management within a supportive collaborative environment.

=== Kumasi Campus ===
The Kumasi campus is located at Calvary Charismatic Church (CCC) close to the KNUST and Ayigya Police Station.

== Affiliations ==
- University of Cape Coast, Cape Coast
- Council for Christian Colleges and Universities, USA
- Association of African Universities
- University of Ghana
- Kwame Nkrumah University of Science and Technology

== Memberships ==
Central University College is a member of the Association of African Universities (AAU))

== Students' union ==
Central University College's Student Representative Council operates mainly from the Miotso campus. The various class representatives serve as contacts on the various campuses.

== People ==
=== List of chancellors ===
- Rev. Dr. Mensa Otabil (1997–Present)

=== List of presidents ===
- Rev. Kingsley Larbi – 1998 to 2003
- P. Y. Gadzekpo FGA 2004 to 2012
- Kwesi Yankah – 2012 to 2017
- Bill Buenar Puplampu – 2017 to date

=== List of registrars ===
- Johnson Kanda (1998–2008)
- J. F. Odartey Blankson (2009–2011)
- Emil Afenyo (2016 – to date)

=== List of vice-presidents ===
- K. Oduro Afriyie – Academic (2006–2012)
- J. F. Odartey Blankson – Finance and Administration (2011 – 2016)

=== List of notable alumni ===
- Adina, musician
- Nathan Kwabena Adisi, broadcaster
- Elvis Agyemang, Pastor @ Grace Mountain Ministries - Alpha Hour
- Yvonne Nelson, actress

== See also ==
- List of universities in Ghana
