= Elmina =

Town in Central Region, Ghana

Elmina Edina (Fanti)
- Town
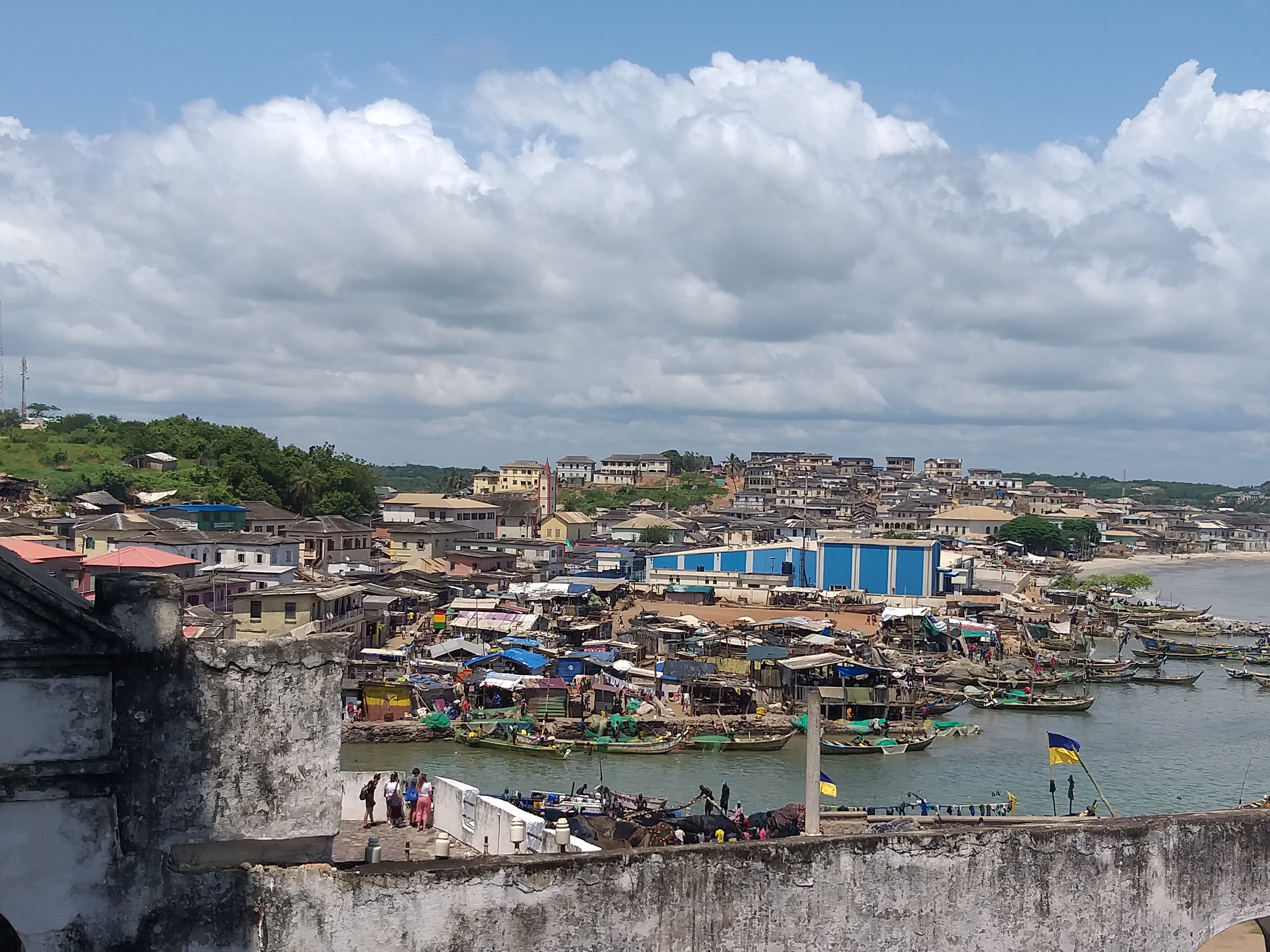
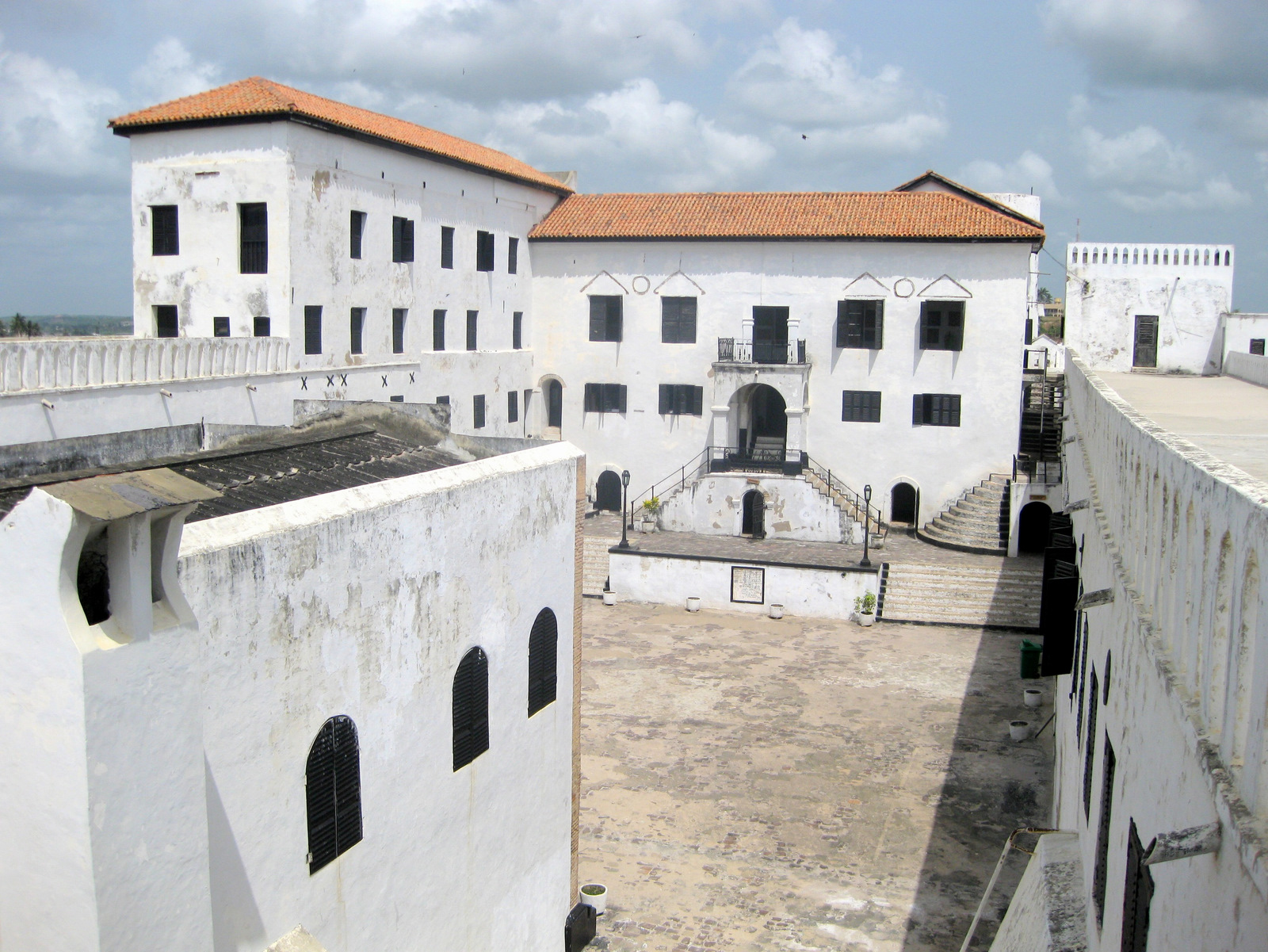
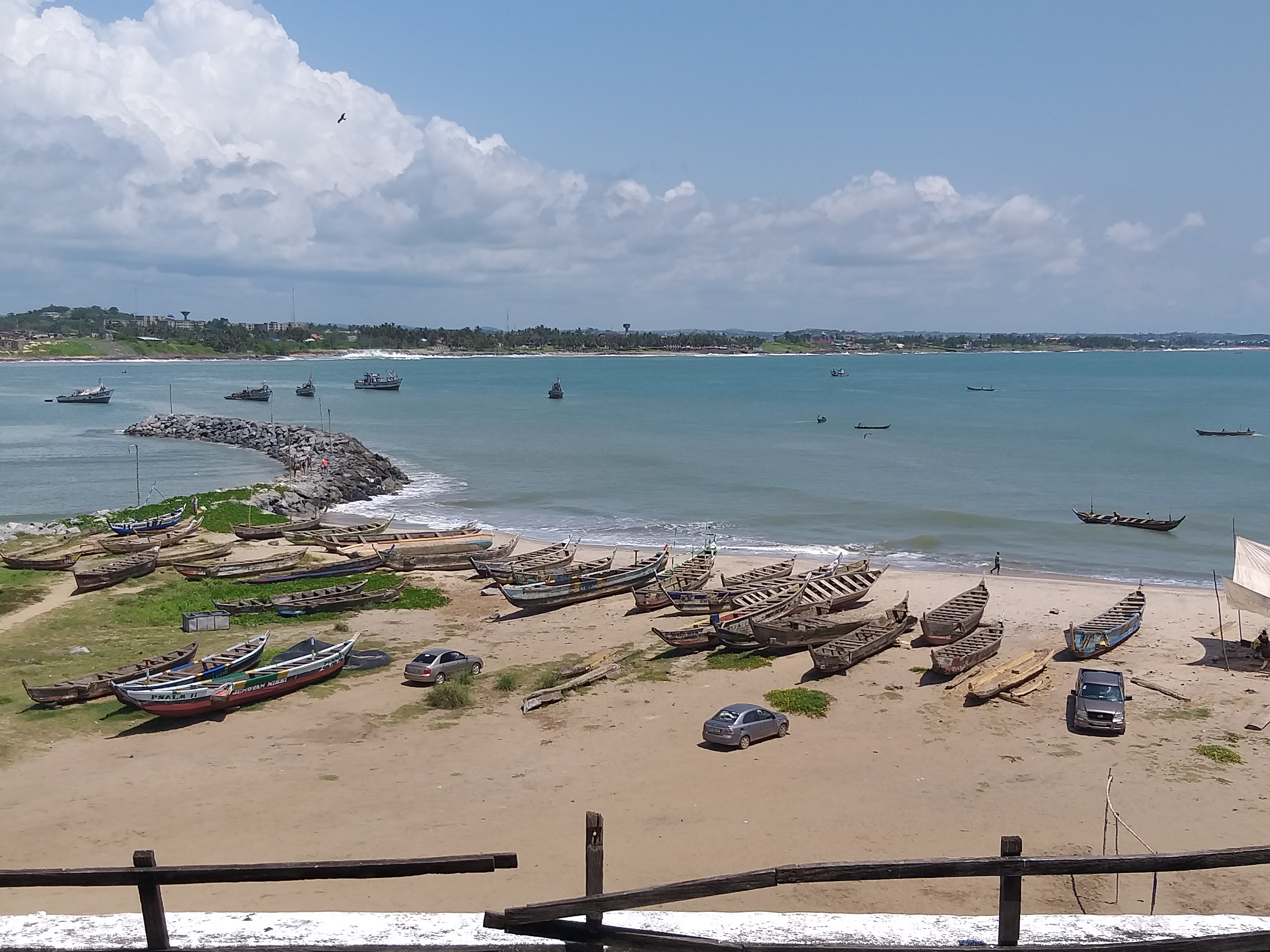
- Top picture: Skyline of Elmina, Bottom left picture: Elmina Castle Bottom right picture: Coast of Elmina on the Gulf of Guinea
- Etymology: Elmina ("The mine")
- Location of Elmina in Central Region, South Ghana Elmina (Africa)
- Coordinates: 5°05′N 1°21′W
- Country: Ghana
- Region: Central Region
- District: Komenda/Edina/Eguafo/Abirem Municipal District

Government
  - Municipal chief: Hon. Solomon Ebo Appiah
- Elevation: 10 m (33 ft)

Population (2013)
  - Total: 33,576
  - Religions: Christianity; Islam; traditional African religions
- Time zone: GMT
  - Summer (DST): GMT
- Postal district: CK
- Area code: 033
- Climate: Aw
- Website: keeama.gov.gh

Elmina (Fante: Edina) is a town and the capital of the Komenda/Edina/Eguafo/Abirem District on the south coast of Ghana in the Central Region. It is situated on a bay on the Atlantic Ocean, 12.2 km (7.6 mi) west of Cape Coast. Elmina was the first European settlement in West Africa and it has a population of 33,576 people, as of 2013. The current Municipality chief of Elmina is Solomon Ebo Appiah.

When the Portuguese, after first coming in contact with the Gold Coast struck an agreement with the King of Elmina to build the São Jorge da Mina Castle in the 1470s, the settlement grew to become an important centre of commerce and trade in the region. Nowadays, Elmina shows strong influence from Europe in its culture and people.

== Etymology ==
Prior to the arrival of the Portuguese, the town was originally called Anomansah ("perpetual" or "inexhaustible drink") from its position on the peninsula between the Benya lagoon and the sea. It eventually was named after the Elmina Castle, which is also called "São Jorge da Mina". The word "Elmina" simply means "the mine".

== History ==
=== Early settlement ===
Based on oral traditions, the town was founded by Kwaa Amankwaa, a hunter who was in search of food. After discovering a stream and settling there, he exchanged the word "M'enya", which means "I have found it" or "I have got it". The exact origins of Elmina, however, are contested. He and his people founded the village of Anomansa or Anomee near the Benya Lagoon, which later became Edina. It was part of the Eguafo kingdom until the late 16th century.

=== Colonization era ===
Historical affiliations
- Eguafo (foundation–c. 1570)
- Portuguese Gold Coast (c. 1570–1637)
- Dutch Gold Coast (1637–1872)
- Gold Coast (1872–1957)
- Ghana (1957–present)

In 1478, during the War of the Castilian Succession, a Castilian armada of 35 caravels and a Portuguese fleet fought a large naval battle near Elmina for the control of the Guinea trade (gold, slaves, ivory and melegueta pepper), the Battle of Guinea. The war ended with a Portuguese naval victory, followed by the official recognition by the Catholic Monarchs of Portuguese sovereignty over most of the West African territories in dispute embodied in the Treaty of Alcáçovas, 1479. This was the first colonial war among European powers. Many more would come.

The town grew around São Jorge da Mina Castle, built by the Portuguese Diogo de Azambuja in 1482. It was Portugal's West African headquarters for trade and exploitation of African wealth. The original Portuguese interest was gold, with 8,000 ounces shipped to Lisbon from 1487 to 1489, 22,500 ounces from 1494 to 1496, and 26,000 ounces by the start of the sixteenth century. Later, the port's trade included slaves. By 1479, the Portuguese were importing slaves from as far away as Benin, who accounted for 10 percent of the trade in Elmina, and were used to clear land for tillage. Ten to twelve thousand came through Elmina from 1500 to 1535 alone.

With Portuguese support, Edina and some neighboring villages achieved independence from Eguafo (and Fetu, which also claimed the area) by around 1570. The town was governed by local elders (known as braffoes) and the governor of the Castle.

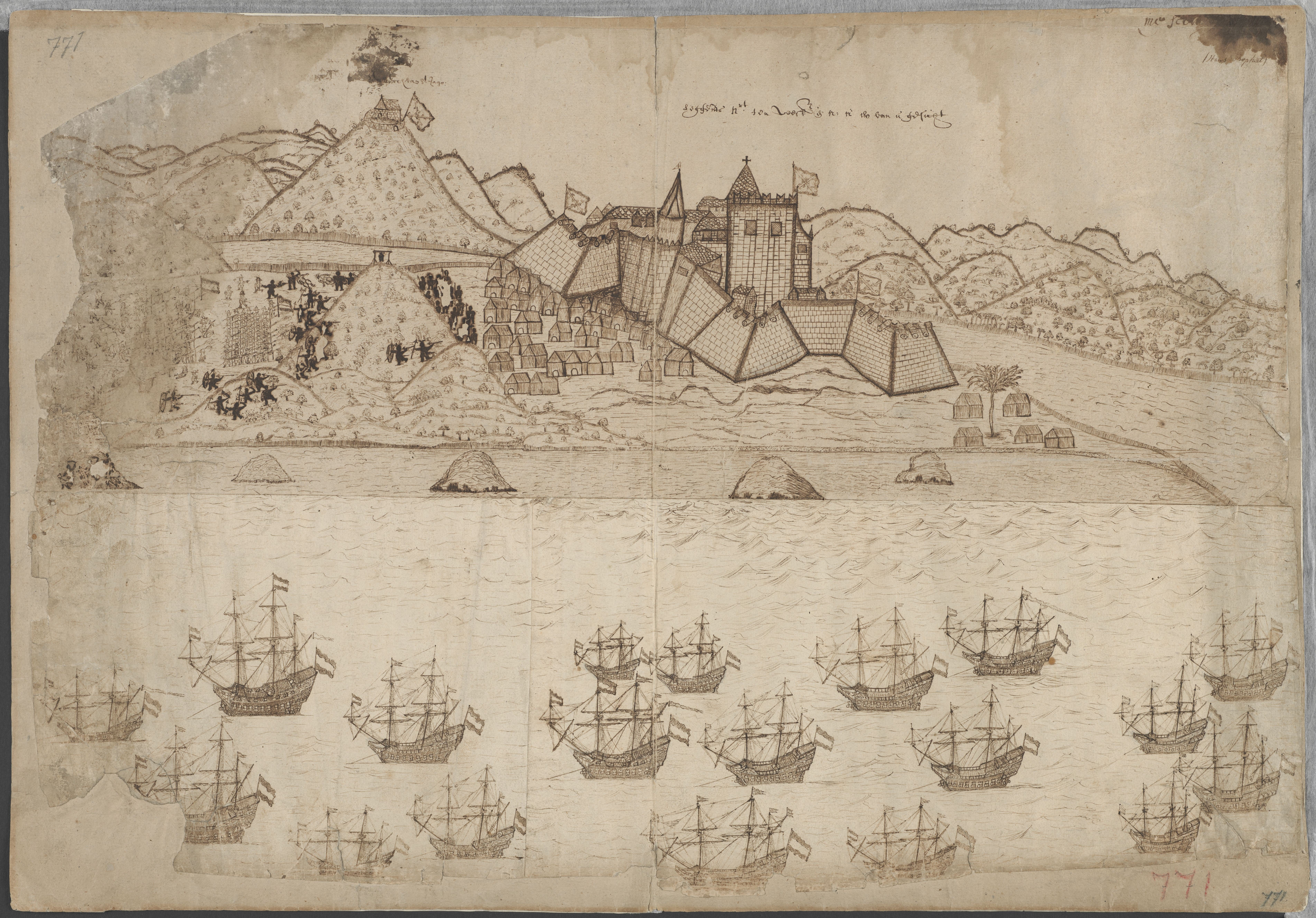
Dutch troops on the shore who have landed are shown battling with natives to take the local fort

Elmina is also home to Fort Coenraadsburg on St. Jago Hill, built by the Portuguese in 1555 under the name Forte de Santiago; it was used for commerce. In 1637, it was conquered and renamed by the Dutch, after they captured Elmina's main castle. Today, Elmina's main economic industry is fishing, salt production and tourism. Elmina Castle is very close to Cape Coast Castle, another historic fortress notable for its role in the transatlantic slave trade.

==== 17th Century to present ====
The location of Elmina made it a significant site for re-provisioning ships headed south towards the Cape of Good Hope on their way to India. After years of Portuguese commerce on the Elmina Coast, the Dutch learned of the profitable activity taking place through Barent Eriksz of Medemblik, one of the earliest traders and Guinea navigators. Ericksz learned about trading on the Elmina coast while he was a prisoner on Principe and subsequently became a major resource to the Dutch in terms of providing geographical and trading information. The Dutch West India Company captured Elmina in 1637; in subsequent centuries it was mostly used as a hub for the slave trade. The British attacked the city in 1782, but it remained in Dutch hands until 1872, when the Dutch Gold Coast was sold to the British. The king of Ashanti, claiming to be suzerain, objected to the transfer, and initiated the third Anglo-Ashanti war of 1873–1874.

In the late 17th century, Quam Desu led a community of Ga and Gen(Mina) to flee from the 1677 Akwamu conquest on Elmina and join the coastal city of Little Popo in Togo. Further attacks on coastal settlements between 1680 and 1681 led to the formation of several coastal settlements to the East. The escapees were eventually joined by Ofori, the presumed king of the displaced Accra kingdom after Okai Koi was killed, when he established Glidji in the Little Popo region sometime between 1683 and 1687. According to a local history written by King Agbanon II, the Ga people migrated from the Accra kingdom under the guidance of members of the nobility including the two princes, Foli Bebe and Foli Hemadzro, after the suicide of their King Okai Koi in 1677, and the eventual Akwamu conquest of Accra. The Ga established a permanent settlement in 1680 at Glidji, which would later become the capital of the Glidji kingdom.

The British adventurer Archibald Dalzel reported in 1793 that Little Popo is “a small, but very warlike kingdom, the remains of the Accras, who were driven out of their own territories on the Gold Coast, by the Aquamboes, in 1680.”

== Economy ==
Beginning in 2003, Elmina, along with foreign investors, began The Elmina Strategy 2015, a massive project to improve many aspects of the town, consisting of water drainage and waste management helping to improve the health of the citizens, repairing the fishing industry and harbour within Elmina, tourism and economic development, improved health services, and improved educational services.

=== Tourism ===
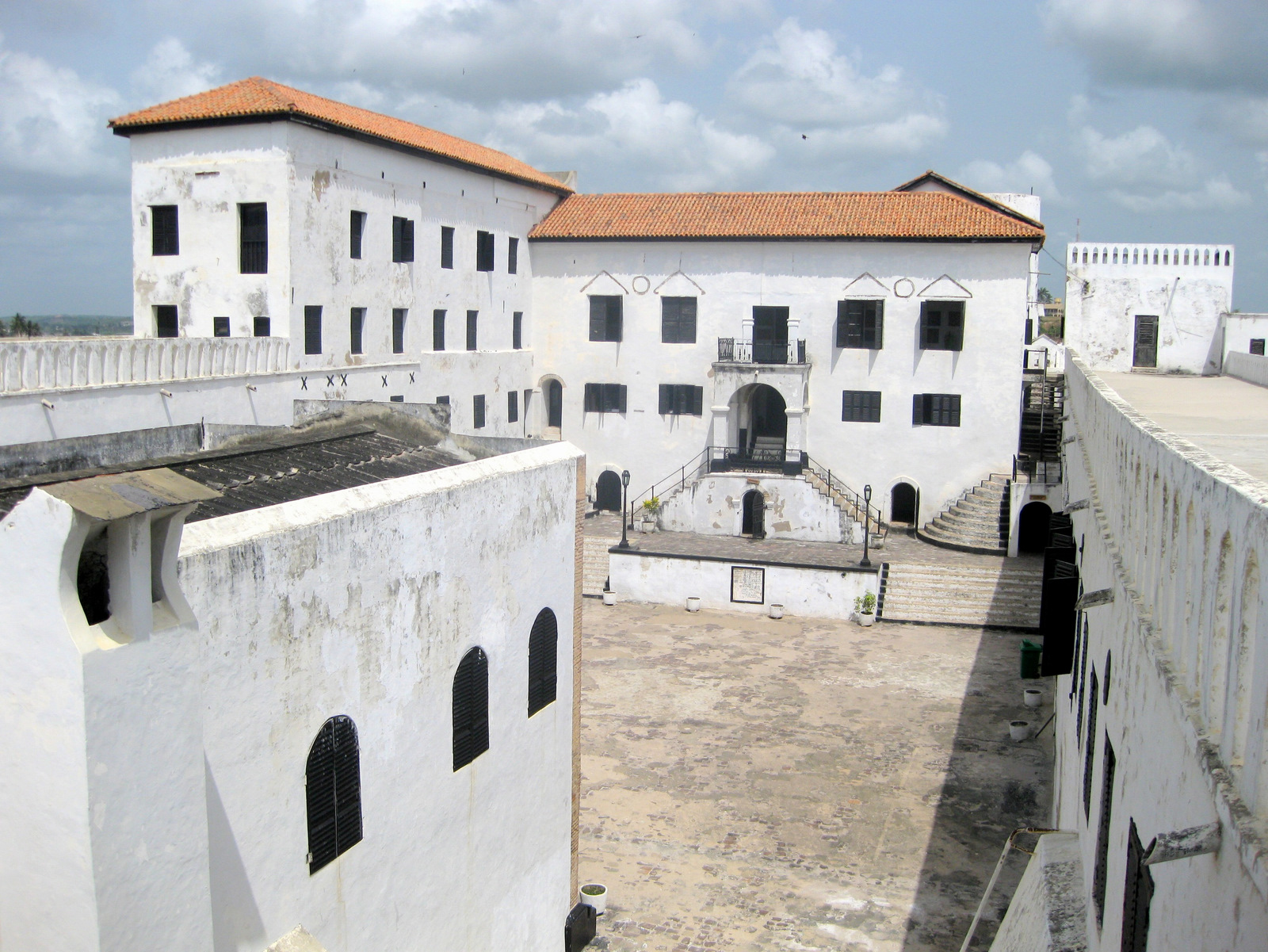
Elmina Castle

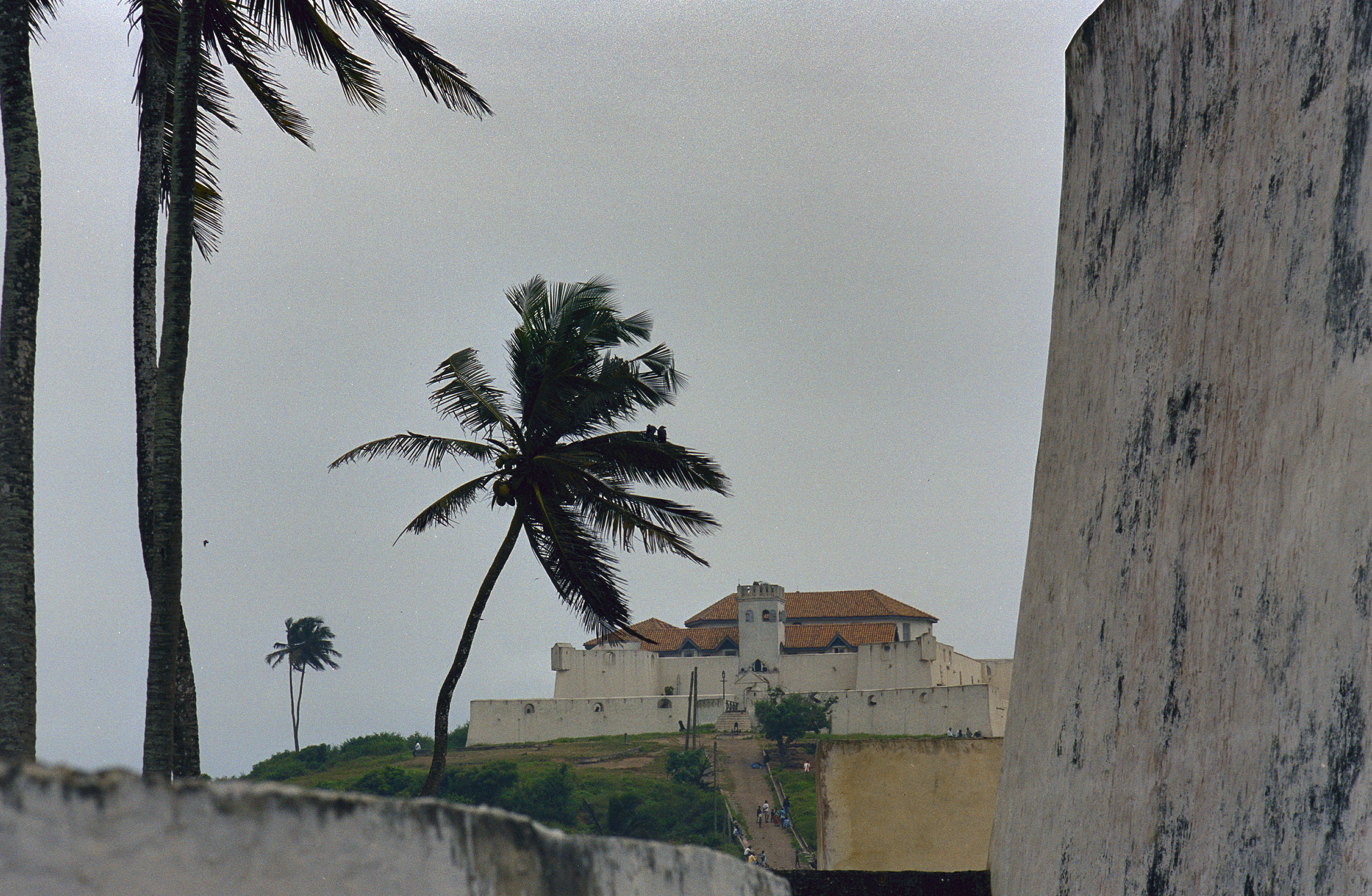
Fort São Jago da Mina

Tourism in the town is regulated by the Central Region Development Commission (CEDECOM), where the principle centre of tourism is the Elmina Castle. The site, along with Fort Coenraadsburg, attracts around 100,000 tourists annually, half of whom is foreign. Due to the lack of sufficient infrastructure, the development of this sector is hindered.

=== Fishing ===
Elmina is home to the Elmina Fishing Harbour, the third largest fish landing site in Ghana, beaten by the Tema and Sekondi harbours. In August 2020, a $93 million rehabilitation project began, improving the harbour's infrastructure to help with increasing demand. It was completed in May 2020.

Although fishing activities are largely artisanal, the town account for 15% of Ghana's total fish output. About 75% of the population's livelihood is reliant on fishing or related activities.

== Demographics ==
Most of the population is religious, coming in at around 91.7% with the biggest religion being Christianity (85.3%). Of this, 28.4% are Pentecostal/Charismatic, 20.9% are other Christians, 18.2% are Catholics and 17.8% are Protestant. Christianity is followed by Islam, traditional African religions, and other religions.

== Administration ==
Although the town itself doesn't have a mayor, the municipal does have a mayor–council form of government. The mayor (executive chief) is appointed by the president of Ghana and approved by the town council, the Komenda/Edina/Eguafo/Abirem Municipal Assembly. The current municipal chief of Elmina is Hon. Solomon Ebo Appiah.

== Geography ==
=== Municipality area ===
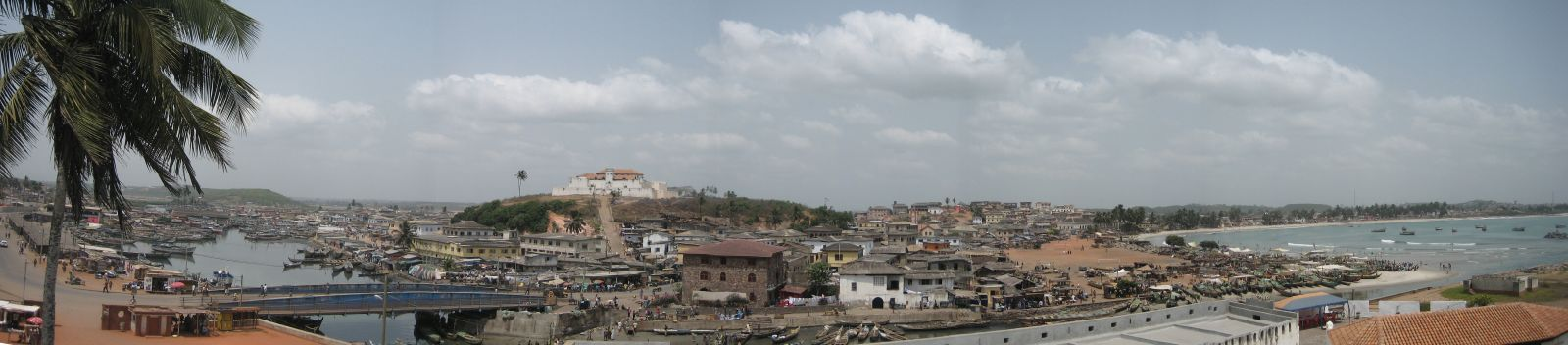
Panoramic view of Elmina Town. In harbour some fishing boats may be seen. The view is from Elmina Castle (St. George's Castle). The castle on St. Jago Hill is Fort São Jago da Mina (Fort Conraadsburg).

Elmina is located about 12.2 km (7.6 mi) from Cape Coast. The town is located in the Komenda/Edina/Eguafo/Abirem Municipal of the Western Region, which covers a land area of 452.5 km^{2} (174.7 sq mi). The municipality borders the Gulf of Guinea to the south, the Cape Coast Metropolitan towards the east, the Twifo/Hemang/Lower Denkyira District to the north and the Mpohor district and the Wassa East District towards the west and northwest.

== Gallery ==
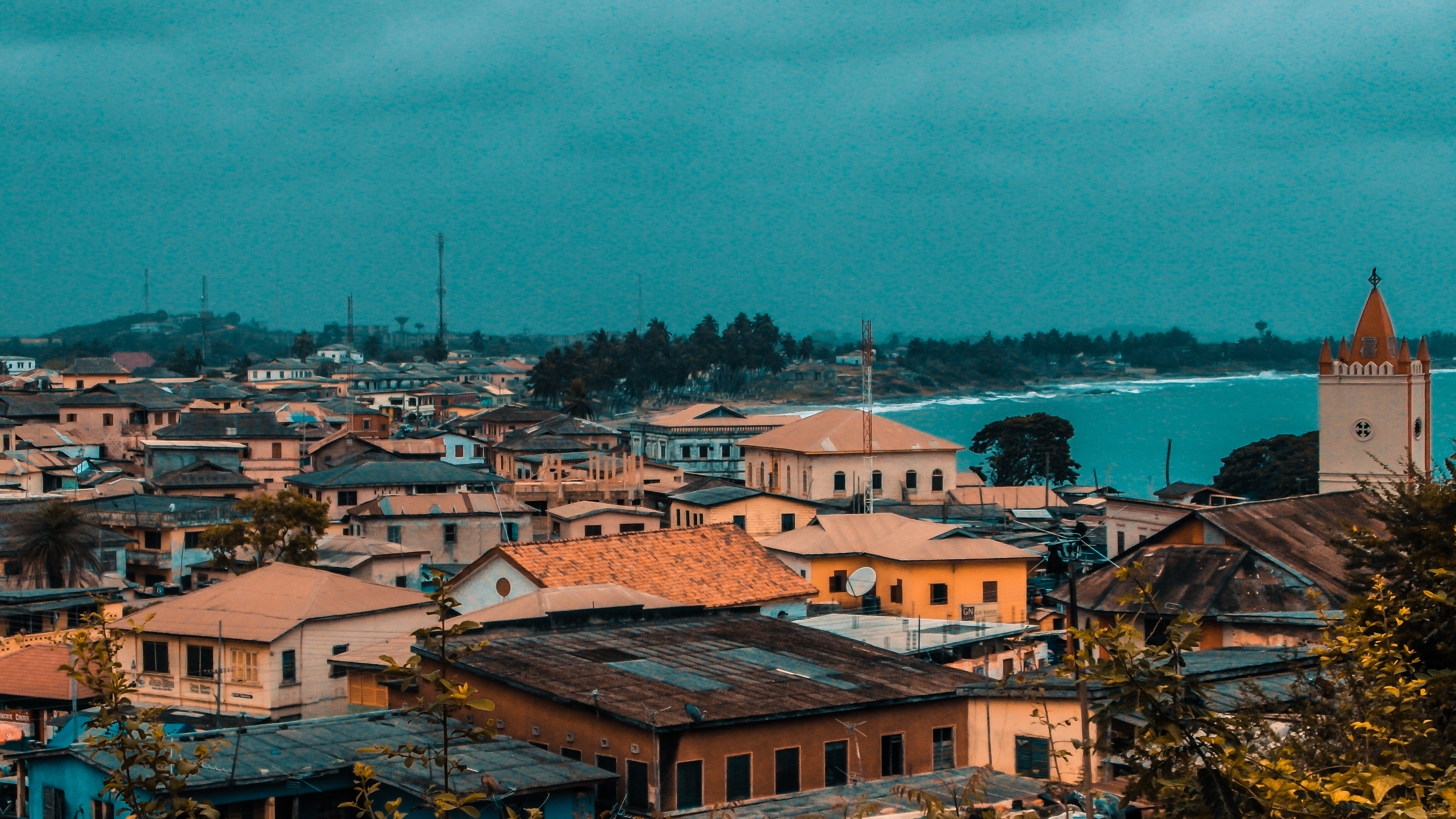
Chapel Square community

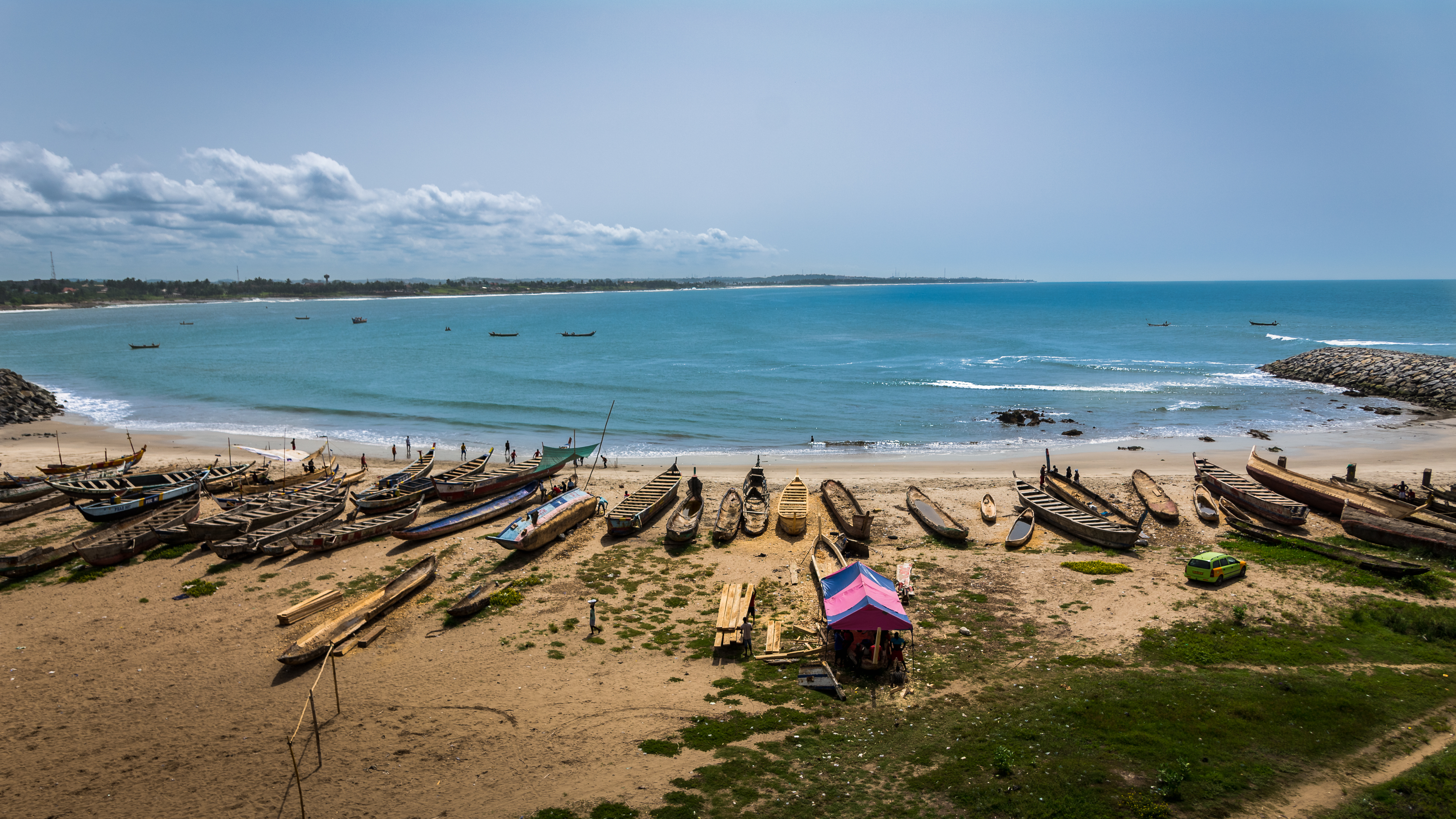
Elmina Beach

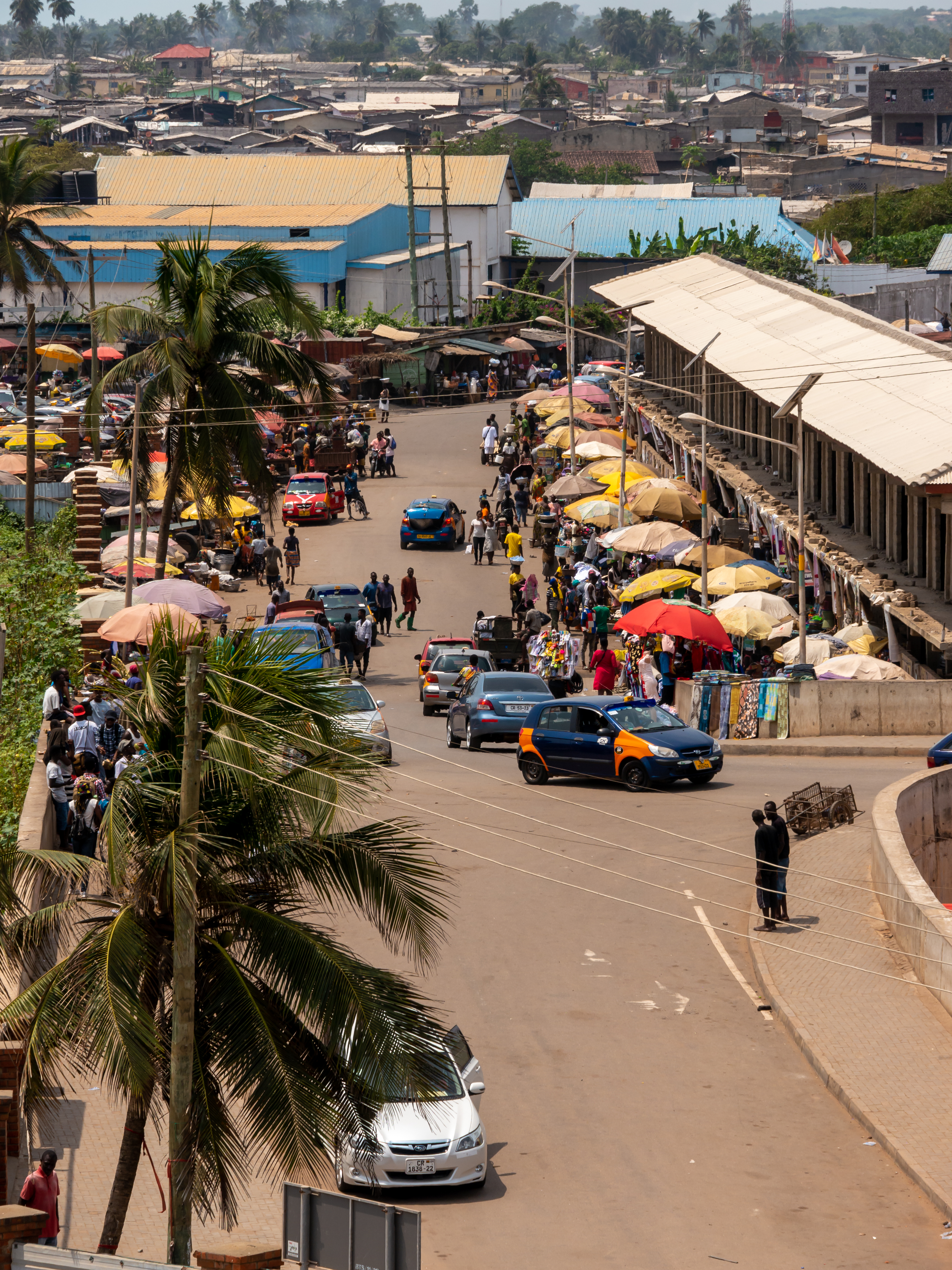
street in Elmina

=== Climate ===
Like most of Ghana, Elmina has a tropical savanna climate (Köppen Aw) with consistently hot weather year-round. Typically for the far south of the country, there are two rainy seasons, a main one from April to June and a lesser one from September to November and two dry seasons, a typical West African dry season from December to February due to the harmattan wind, and a less typical dry season from mid-July to mid-September with less hot temperatures and abundant fog due to the northward extension of the Benguela Current.

Climate data for Elmina
Month	Jan	Feb	Mar	Apr	May	Jun	Jul	Aug	Sep	Oct	Nov	Dec	Year
Mean daily maximum °C (°F)	30.8 (87.4)	31.4 (88.5)	31.8 (89.2)	31.5 (88.7)	30.6 (87.1)	28.7 (83.7)	27.4 (81.3)	26.9 (80.4)	27.9 (82.2)	29.5 (85.1)	30.8 (87.4)	30.9 (87.6)	29.9 (85.8)
Mean daily minimum °C (°F)	22.7 (72.9)	23.5 (74.3)	23.8 (74.8)	23.8 (74.8)	23.7 (74.7)	23.1 (73.6)	22.3 (72.1)	21.8 (71.2)	22.5 (72.5)	22.9 (73.2)	22.7 (72.9)	22.8 (73.0)	23.0 (73.4)
Average rainfall mm (inches)	25 (1.0)	36 (1.4)	84 (3.3)	103 (4.1)	203 (8.0)	325 (12.8)	102 (4.0)	42 (1.7)	55 (2.2)	116 (4.6)	84 (3.3)	30 (1.2)	1,205 (47.6)
Source: Climate-Data.org

== Culture ==
Elmina is home to the annual Bakatue Festival, a celebration of the sea and the local fishing culture, held on the first Tuesday of July each year. Bakatue translated means "the opening of the lagoon" or the "draining of the Lagoon". It is celebrated to commemorate the founding of the town, Elmina by the Europeans. It is also celebrated to invoke the deity, Nana Benya's continuous protection of the state and its people.

The Edina Bronya Festival is an annual harvest festival celebrated by the chiefs and peoples of Elmina in the Central Region of Ghana. The festival is a novel Christmas during the Portuguese and the Dutch era of the colonial period. It is the origin the word “Bronya” in Ghanaian vocabulary. It is usually celebrated in the first Thursday of January every year.

== Sister cities ==
The following is a list of sister cities of Elmina, designated by Sister Cities International:

- Gouda, Netherlands (2006)
- Macon, United States (2001)

== Notable people ==
- Solomon Kojo Antwi, footballer
- Jacobus Capitein, writer, first individual of African descent to be ordained as a minister in an established Protestant church
- George Emil Eminsang, merchant, politician
- Frederik Willem Fennekol, politician
- Adjua Gyapiaba, herbalist, diviner
- Frans Last, jurist, served as the attorney general (Dutch: procureur-generaal) at the Supreme Court of the Dutch East Indies
- Cynthia Mamle Morrison, politician, minister designate for Gender, Children and Social Protection
- Willem Essuman Pietersen, politician
- Henry van Hien, nationalist leader
- Hendrik Vroom, merchant
- Mensa Otabil, pastor and theologian

== See also ==
- Elmina Castle
- List of former European colonies
- List of cities in Ghana

== Bibliography ==
- Adjaye, J. (2018). Elmina, 'the Little Europe'. Sub-Saharan Publishers. ISBN 9789988550967.
- Diffie, B.; Winius, G. (1977). Foundations of the Portuguese Empire, 1415-1580. Vol. 1. University of Minnesota Press. ISBN 0816608504.
- Doortmont, Michel (2004). The pen-pictures of modern Africans and African celebrities by Charles Francis Hutchison: a collective biography of elite society in the Gold Coast Colony. Leiden: Brill. ISBN 9789004140974.
- Konadu, Kwasi (2010). The Akan Diaspora in the Americas. Oxford: Oxford University Press. doi:10.1093/acprof:oso/9780195390643.001.0001. ISBN 9780195390643.
- Malyn, N. (2004). A History of Portuguese Overseas Expansion, 1400-1668. Routledge. ISBN 9780415239806.
