= CPU Research Center =

Filipino research center

Central Philippine University Research Center
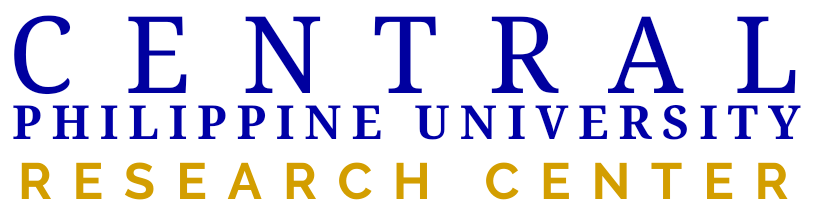
- Abbreviation: URC, CPU Research Center
- Formation: 1998
- Type: Research Institute/Center
- Purpose: Research and coordinate/facilitator to other research centers of Central Philippine University
- Headquarters: Iloilo City, Western Visayas
- Location: Philippines
- Budget: Php 4,429,667 (2006)
- Website: https://urc.cpu.edu.ph/

CPU Research Center (officially, Central Philippine University Research Center or University Research Center), is one of the research centers of Central Philippine University and an integral part of the University's Outreach Center, though it was created in June 1998 as a separate center.

Since the research center's separation from the CPU Outreach Center, each center works towards strengthening the research and outreach functions of Central Philippine University. The Center is a service unit of the university under the Office of the Vice President for Academic Affairs. Its main task is to coordinate research activities of the different colleges and units of the university and to convene and facilitate the affairs of the University Research Committee (URESCOM).

Eight years after the research office was created, the Research Center gained ground in creating a strong research culture in the university. On 25 January 2006, the Commission on Higher Education (Philippines)(CHED) awarded the research program the 2006 Best Higher Education Institution (HEI) Research Program in the country; it was the lone awardee from Region 6. In 2006, the Center, along with other research centers of Central Philippine University, had a budget allocation of Php 4,429,667 for research and development.
