= Ewurama Bennin =

Ghanaian author

Ewurama Bennin is a Ghanaian author, educational administrator, leadership development professional, and a non-profit founder. She is currently the Programme Manager for the Central Leadership Programme (CLP), an initiative from the International Central Gospel Church (ICGC). She is also the founder of a non-profit organisation, Reformation Community, dedicated to empowering young people in Ghana and across Africa. Bennin is also a published children's author whose work has been featured in the United Nations SDG Book Club Africa.

== Personal life ==
Bennin is a married woman and a mother of one. She has credited her son as the inspiration for her children's books, stating simply, "My son, he loves stories, so I started making up stories for him".

In a 2021 interview, she described her multiple roles, stating, "I work full-time with the youth leadership development organisation as a program manager, a student, wife, and mother."

== Career ==
Bennin currently serves as the Programme Manager for the Central Leadership Programme (CLP), an initiative of the International Central Gospel Church (ICGC) in Ghana. The initiative by the church is to nurture activist leaders driven by faith-based values across all sphere of life in Ghana and across the Africa continent.

In July 2024, she was featured as a guest on the Alternative Convos podcast hosted by Charles Kojo Vandyck, where she discussed the mission and the impact of the Central Leadership Programme. The title of the episode was, " Moulding the Future of Activism with Faith-Based Values", where they discussed how CLP works to develop leaders who can drive positive transformative in Africa through faith-based approach.
