= Togbe Edzeani V =

Ghanaian traditional leader

Togbe Edzeani V, known in private life as MacMillan Asem, is a Ghanaian traditional leader who was installed of Dufia, Fodome Amele and Divisional Chief of the Fodome Traditional Area in the Volta Region of Ghana.

== Education and professional background ==
Togbe Edzeani holds master's degrees from Central University and the University of Ghana.

Prior his installation, Asem worked as a banking consultant, providing advisory services to international firms spanning 15 years across Europe, Asia, the Americas and Africa.

== Traditional leadership ==
Togbe Edzeani V was installed at a ceremony held on 13 August 2026 at the White House in Fodome Amele. The ceremony was attended by traditional leaders, queen mothers, community members and a delegation from Abutia led by its Paramount Chief, Togbega Kodzo Gidi. He succeeded Togbe Gbotor IV as Divisional Chief of Fodome Amele.

His installation was conducted according to the customs and traditions of the Fodome Traditional Council. Fodome Amele is settlement of the Fodome people and a place of historical and cultural significance to the community.

== Philanthropy and community development ==
Asem has been associated with philanthropic activities and charitable initiatives in Ghana. He is involved with Nawonu Foundation in supporting individuals and communities through nongovernmental and charitable work.
