= Elvis Agyemang =

Ghanaian televangelist

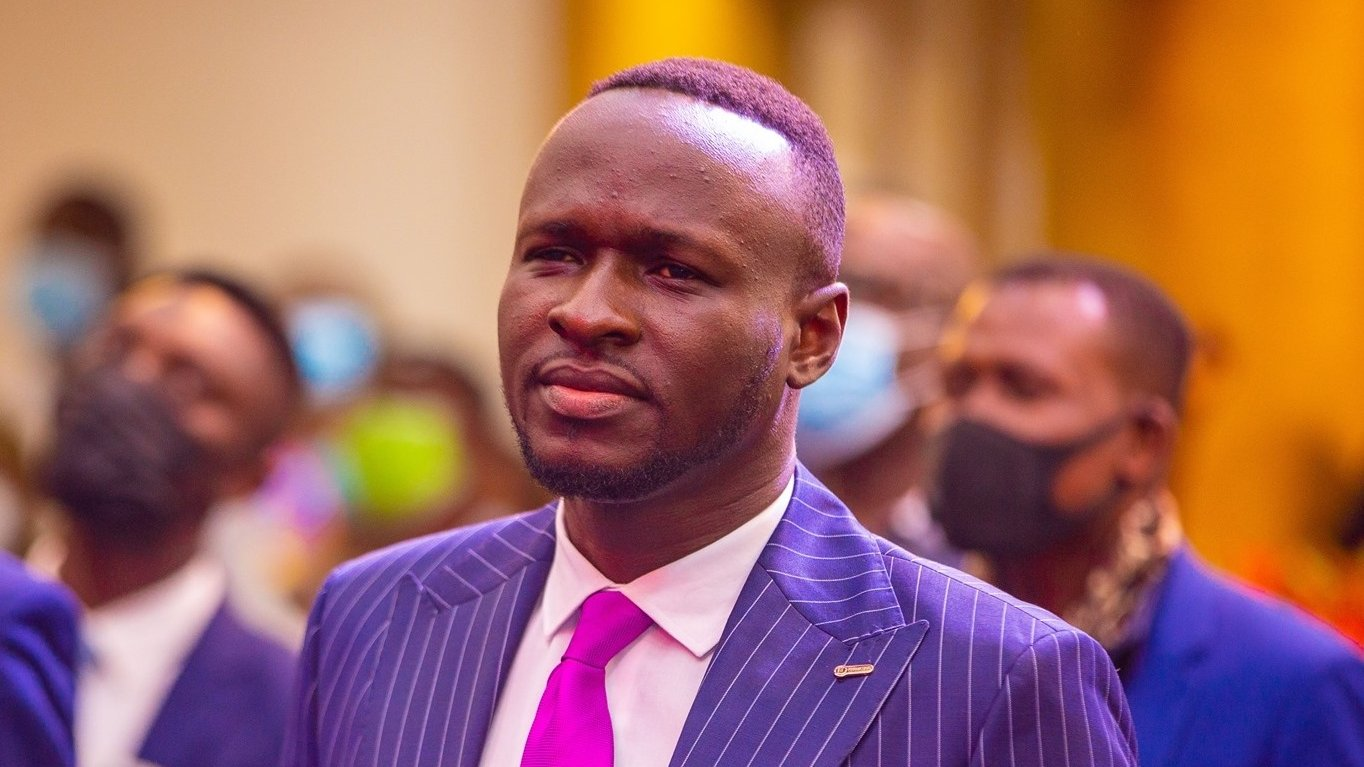
- Born: 24 October 1988 (age 38); Kumasi, Ghana
- Education: Adventist Senior High School, Kwame Nkrumah University of Science and Technology, Central University

Ecclesiastical career
- Religion: Christianity
- Church: Grace Mountain Ministry
- Offices held: Head Pastor, Grace Mountain Ministry
- Website: elvisagyemang.org

Elvis Agyemang (born 24 October 1988) is a Ghanaian televangelist and religious leader. He is the founder of Grace Mountain Ministry and is best known for Alpha Hour, a religious Facebook Live Stream.

== Early life and education ==
Elvis was born in Tema but relocated to Kumasi with his family where he had his basic school education. He completed Adventist Senior High School before proceeding to pursue a BSc. Biological Science at the Kwame Nkrumah University of Science and Technology. He also has an MSc. Religious Studies from the Central University.

== Career ==
=== Alpha hour ===
Elvis Agyemang launched Alpha Hour, a one-hour online non-denominational prayer meeting, on his social media pages. His Facebook live broadcast has grown to be one of the most watched live stream in Ghana since its start with a peak viewership of 50,000.

=== Alpha Hour Controversy ===
Ghanaian gospel musician Esther Smith claim that she was asked to pay €300,000 to save her life has been openly disputed by QueenLet, who says the story is false, exaggerated, and improperly tied to music promotion and Alpha Hour, led by Pastor Elvis Agyemang.

Elvis Agyemang with his wife, Lady Mercy Agyemang

== Personal life ==
Rev. Elvis Agyemang is married to Mercy Agyemang and they both live in Accra with their two children.
