= Frederik Willem Fennekol =

Dutch jurist and politician

Member of the Committee for East Indian Trade and Possessions
- In office 4 January 1796 – 15 May 1800

Provisional Representative of the People of Holland
- In office 11 April 1795 – 2 March 1796

Personal details
- Born: c. 1761; St. George d'Elmina, Dutch Gold Coast
- Died: 23 January 1837 (aged 75); Noordwijk-Binnen, Netherlands

Frederik Willem Fennekol (circa 1761 – 23 January 1837) was a Dutch jurist and politician.

== Biography ==
Frederik Willem Fennekol was born in Elmina on the Dutch Gold Coast to Johann Christiaan Fennekol, an official of the Dutch West India Company originally from Hamburg, and the African woman Eviba Maij. In contrast to his three sisters, who remained on the Gold Coast their entire lives, Frederik Willem Fennekol was sent by his father to the Netherlands at a very young age, and never returned to the Gold Coast.

Frederik Willem Fennekol grew up in Amsterdam with Johannes van Gessel, a friend of his father's, and was baptised in the Amstelkerk in 1768. He was registered as a candidate in law at the University of Harderwijk on 1 October 1784 and gained a doctorate in law at the University of Leiden on 29 February 1788.

Fennekol played an important role in the Batavian Revolution. Together with Alexander Gogel, Samuel Wiselius and Willem Ockerse, Fennekol represented the unitarist faction, which aimed to transform the confederate United Provinces into a unitary state. In March 1795, he was made Provisional Representative of the people of Holland. On 24 December 1795, Fennekol was elected member of the Committee for East Indian Trade and Possessions, a new committee formed by the States General of the Batavian Republic to replace the Lords Seventeen, the previous body to govern the Dutch East India Company.

In 1806, Fennekol resigned from all public offices, as he did not want to serve under Louis Bonaparte, the newly proclaimed King of Holland. In 1813, after William I declared himself Sovereign Prince of the Netherlands, Fennekol accepted the position of archivist at the Ministry of Colonies, but was sacked after Anton Reinhard Falck took office as Minister for the Colonies on 19 March 1818, after which he served at the Ministry of Justice. Fennekol retired in 1822.

Fennekol was a friend of Hendrik Willem Tydeman. With his help he published a treatise about the possibility of transforming the Dutch Gold Coast into a settler colony in 1831.

Fennekol died in Noordwijk-Binnen on 23 January 1837.

== Reputation ==
Fennekol was one of the few public servants who out of principle refused to work under King Louis Napoleon and later King William I. The nineteenth century writer Conrad Busken Huet had little sympathy for Fennekol's principled stance. The twentieth century historian Cor de Wit was much more understanding of Fennekol's republican ideals, however.

== Personal life ==
Fennekol married Johanna Thuret (1763–1834) on 19 April 1786. They had three daughters that survived infancy.

== Publications ==
- Proeve over de kust van Guinea: houdende eene poging tot onderzoek, hoe, en in hoeverre, dat land tot eene ware volkplanting zou kunnen gevormd worden (1831)
