= Research culture =

Social interactions within the scientific community

Research culture encompasses the social behaviour, expectations, attitudes and norms that emerge when people come together to undertake creative and systematic work to increase the stock of knowledge. It includes the values, assumptions, beliefs, rituals and other forms of behaviour shared by these groups.

Research culture is part of the wider organisational culture of organisations that undertake research, such as universities, learned societies and research institutes. However, research culture also exists within disciplines and intellectual networks that exist across multiple institutions. Organisations may contain multiple research cultures, just as there is often no single institutional culture in large organisations.

An ideal research culture is supportive, collaborative, creative and inclusive. However current research cultures are often characterised by metricisation, increased competition, lack of job security and insufficient career flexibility. This can result in issues related to leadership and management, as well as problematic power dynamics, such as patronage, bullying and harassment, discrimination and exploitation.

== Definitions ==
In 2007, Linda Evans published a definition of research culture that has been widely cited by subsequent work. Her explanation of institutional research culture was: "...the values, assumptions, beliefs, rituals and other forms of behaviour whose central focus is the acceptance and recognition of research practice and output as valued, worthwhile and preeminent activity."

In 2017, the UK Royal Society published a definition of research culture that has also been widely cited.

"Research culture encompasses the behaviours, values, expectations, attitudes and norms of our research communities. It influences researchers’ career paths and determines the way that research is conducted and communicated."

While the definitions quoted above are widely used, they were both developed in the United Kingdom and relate mainly to the European context. In 2022, Bill Puplampu, Stella Nkomo and colleagues reminded us that perceptions should be understood within the historical and post-colonial realities affecting higher education. Working with sub-Saharan African universities across six countries, they defined research culture as:

"...the mixed range of individual and collective values, behaviors, and institutional practices of a university (or other knowledge-based organization) built up over time within a particular internal and national context which inform the level of research uptake by organization members and have a direct impact on individual and organizational research productivity."

== History ==
=== Town versus gown ===
See main articles: Medieval university; Town and gown.

Medieval universities in Europe operated as independently established scholastic guilds, initially without authorization from national or local authorities. Over time, they often gained exemptions from the jurisdiction of the civil courts, and were instead under the legal protection of the clergy. This allowed scholars to break secular laws with near impunity until reforms in the mid-1400's.

The universities also attracted many foreign scholars. As university business was conducted in Latin, these scholars often did not learn the local language. These factors enabled the universities to operate separately, with their own language and established traditions.

=== The Invisible College ===
See main article: Invisible College.

In the 1640's, Robert Boyle used the term 'Invisible College' to refer to his correspondence with others who were developing knowledge through experimental investigation. Since that time, the Invisible College has been taken to mean a group of scholars working together outside of any organised institution, bound by high levels of informal information sharing and communication.

=== Research norms ===
See main article: Mertonian norms.

In 1942 Robert K. Merton drew on his expertise and experience as a senior researcher to describe four ‘norms’ of research activity that he felt held across both the social and physical sciences. He continued to develop these ideas throughout his career. Others, such as Bernard Barber and Norman Storer, added to these descriptions of the underlying attitudes held by researchers. Building on these ideas in 1974, Ian Mitroff provided several ‘counter-norms’, based on his interviews with senior geochemists and other physical scientists working with Moon rocks.

Norms	Counter-norms
Faith in the moral virtue of rationality: things must be understood in as abstract and as general a fashion as possible.	Faith in the moral virtue of rationality and nonrationality: it is the interplay between both personal and impersonal forces that drives research.
Universalism: claims are tested against pre-established impersonal criteria.	Particularism: research is judged, in part, on the social and psychological characteristics of the scientist.
Communism: discoveries are produced through social collaboration and are the property of the whole research community.	Solitariness: scientists exert protective control over their discoveries (e.g. prior to publication).
Emotional neutrality as a condition for rationality.	Emotional commitment: scientists should be emotionally committed to their ideas.
Disinterestedness: the activities of scientists are subject to rigorous policing by other scientists.	Interestedness in their special communities of interest.
Organised scepticism: the suspension of judgment and the detached scrutiny of beliefs.	Organised dogmatism: believe in their own findings while doubting those of others.

Together, they seek to provide an understanding of common attitudes towards research by elaborating contrasting sets of social expectations, such as ‘emotional neutrality’ versus ‘emotional commitment’ - researchers should remain detached from their research, but they are also strongly committed to their research. These ideas have been challenged by researchers such as Michael Mulkay, who argued that they are not so much ‘norms’ as expressions of ideology.

== Changing research cultures ==
Research culture can be improved, or can deteriorate. In modern universities, there is a tension between the managerial element of the university and the ideals of academic freedom and research culture. As John Kenny writes:

"The challenge is to find ways of monitoring and controlling academic work that promote productivity and for university management to recognise that the academic voice is essential for shaping the institutional mechanisms, such as academic workload and performance management, so they do not undermine the essential nature of academic work."

Two scoping studies in 2024 examined components of research culture. Elena Tikhonova and Lilia Raitskaya clarified that research culture applies at different levels: mainstream culture outside an institution; overarching climate of different institutions; departmental cultures; microcultures created in research labs and centres; and individual cultures. The components of research culture include stakeholders (agents), values, behaviours, capacities & personal traits, environment, policies, processes, assessment & indicators, and research performance. Amanda Blatch-Jones, Kay Lakin and Sarah Thomas found that research culture can be positively improved by focusing on four areas:

- Security and career progression.
- Wellbeing and equality of opportunity.
- Teamwork and supportive working relationships.
- Research quality and accountability.

Research into university leadership and research culture in sub-Saharan Africa showed that the influence of leaders on research culture within their universities is neither linear nor simple. The authors identified four elements that university leaders can attempt to address: clarifying research expectations and prioritizing the type of research to be undertaken; creating an enabling environment and providing resources; building research capacity and skills of academic staff; and role modeling expected research behaviors. They also identified a significant role for university leaders in lobbying governments to make the case for the resources and funding needed to meet the expectations set for a national university system.
