= Fort Coenraadsburg =

1652 Dutch-built fort in coastal Ghana

- Part of Dutch Gold Coast
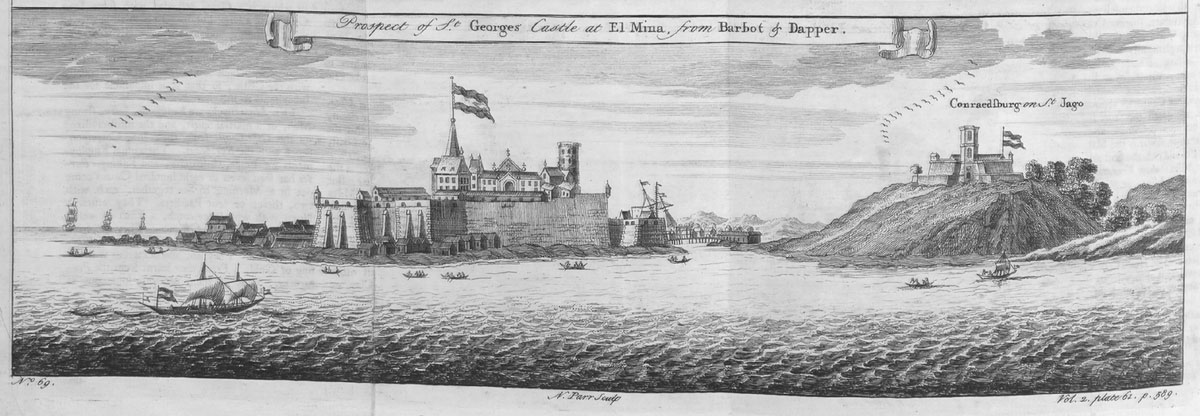
- 17th-century view on Elmina. Fort Elmina is on the left, Fort Coenraadsburg on the right.

Location
- Coordinates: 5.08444°N 1.35083°W

Site history
- Built: 1652

Garrison information
- Occupants: Netherlands (1652-1872)

UNESCO World Heritage Site
- Official name: Fort St. Jago (Fort Conraadsburg)
- Location: Elmina, Central Region, Ghana
- Part of: Forts and Castles, Volta, Greater Accra, Central and Western Regions
- Criteria: Cultural: (vi)
- Reference: 34-005
- Inscription: 1979 (3rd Session)

Fort Coenraadsburg or Conraadsburg, also Fort São Tiago da Mina, is a small fort situated opposite the Elmina Castle in the Central region of Ghana, built around a Portuguese chapel for Saint Jago, to protect Fort Elmina from attacks. Owing to its historical importance and testimony to the Atlantic slave trade, Fort Conraadsburg was inscribed on the UNESCO World Heritage List in 1979 along with several other castles in Ghana.

== History ==
Fort Conraadsburg was built in the 1660s. It was built on the site of a fortified chapel that the Portuguese had built and that the Dutch had burned to the ground in the Battle of Elmina (1637). The Dutch ceded the fort to Britain in 1872, together with the entire Dutch Gold Coast. Before the fort was built, the Dutch used the hill as a gun-position to bombard the Portuguese in the year 1637. To prevent others from doing the same tactic against the Portuguese, the Dutch constructed a fortified earthwork the following year

== Features ==
In the 1660s, the then Elmina Castle Director General J. Valckenburgh changed the earthen fortification with a permanent fort made up of local sandstone and named it Coenraadsburg. The fort was built mainly for military purposes so it had no commercial warehouses. The fort was well-garrisoned so the Dutch used it as a prison for European convicts and also as a disciplinary institution for their officers who are disobedient to their laws.

Ever since the fort was transferred from the Dutch to the British, they modified the fort for the easy use of it for civilian pursuit. In recent years, the fort has been used as a prison, a hospital and a rest house. The fort currently in a good condition, is used as an inn and a restaurant. The fort opening hours are 9:00am to 4:30pm.

== Gallery ==
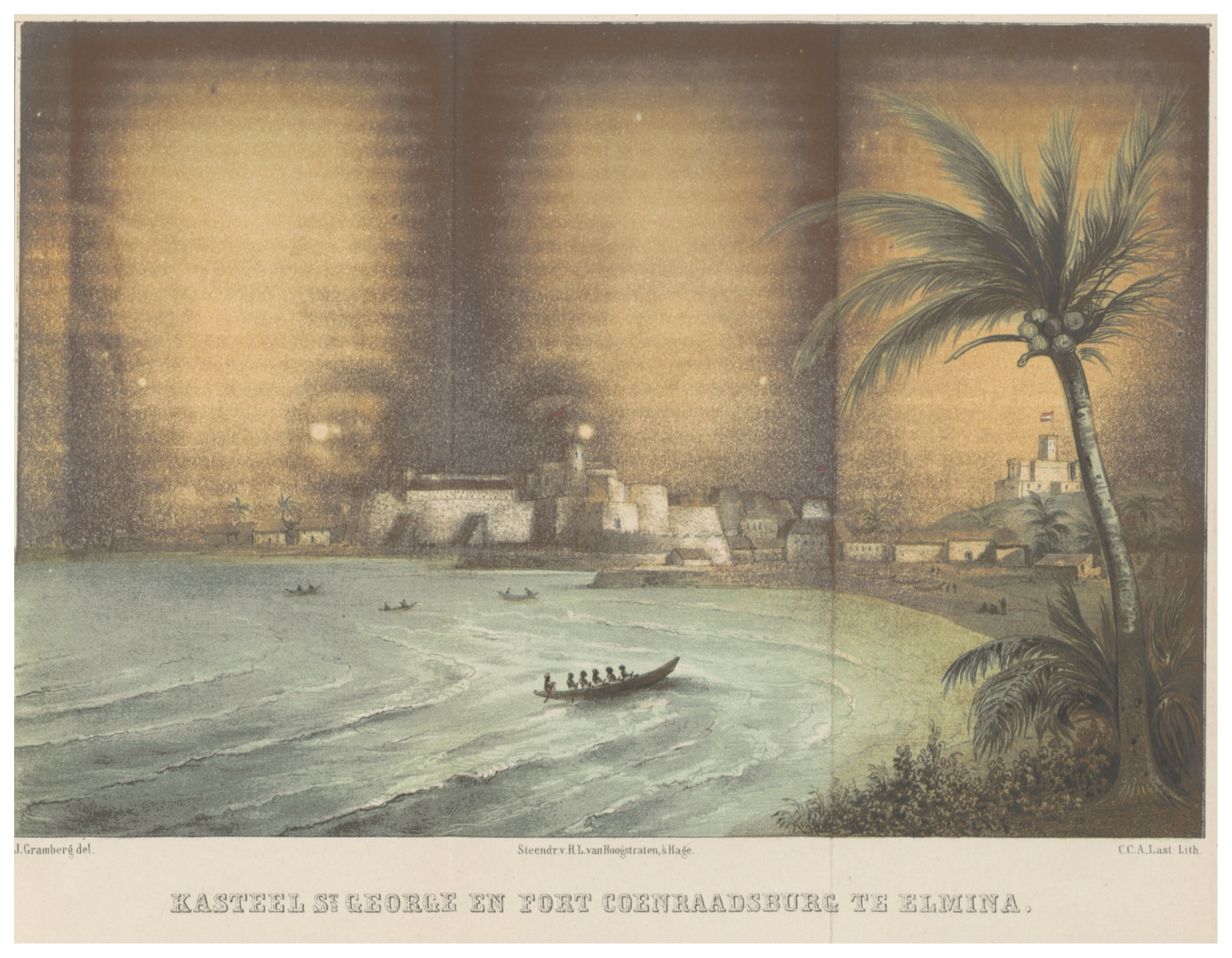
Fort Coenraadsburg (published 1861)

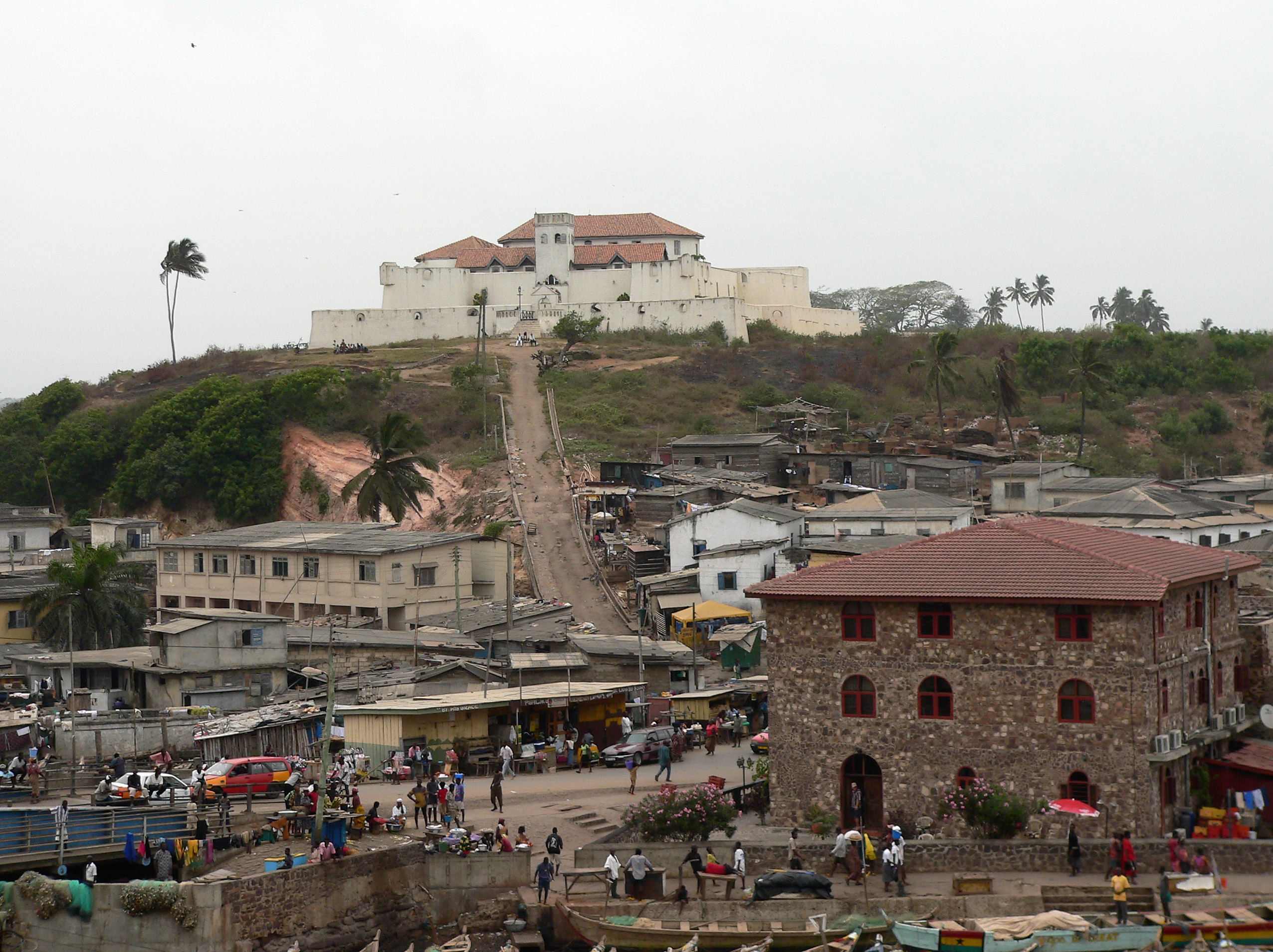
View of Coenraadsburg from Elmina

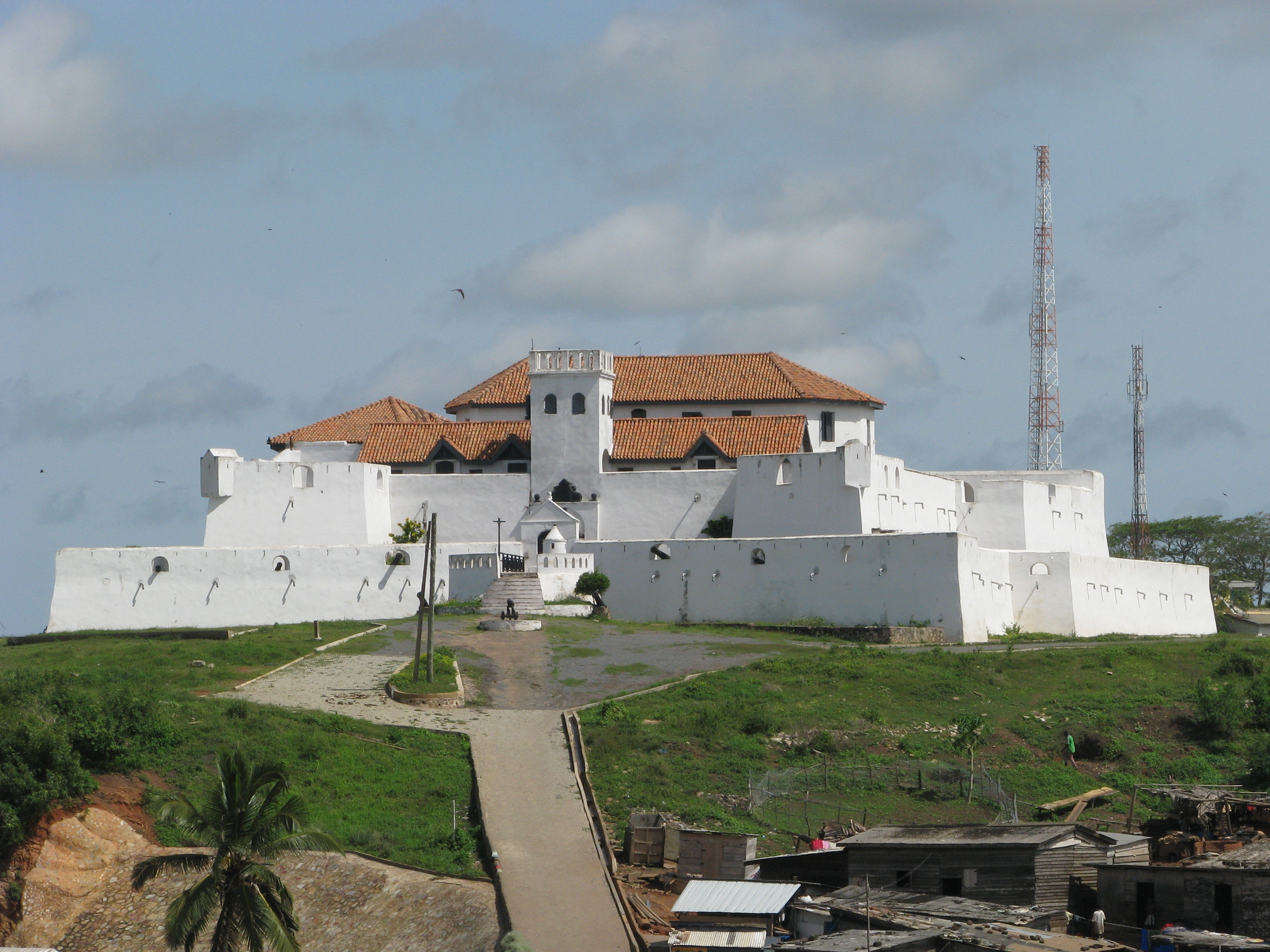
Fort Coenraadsburg

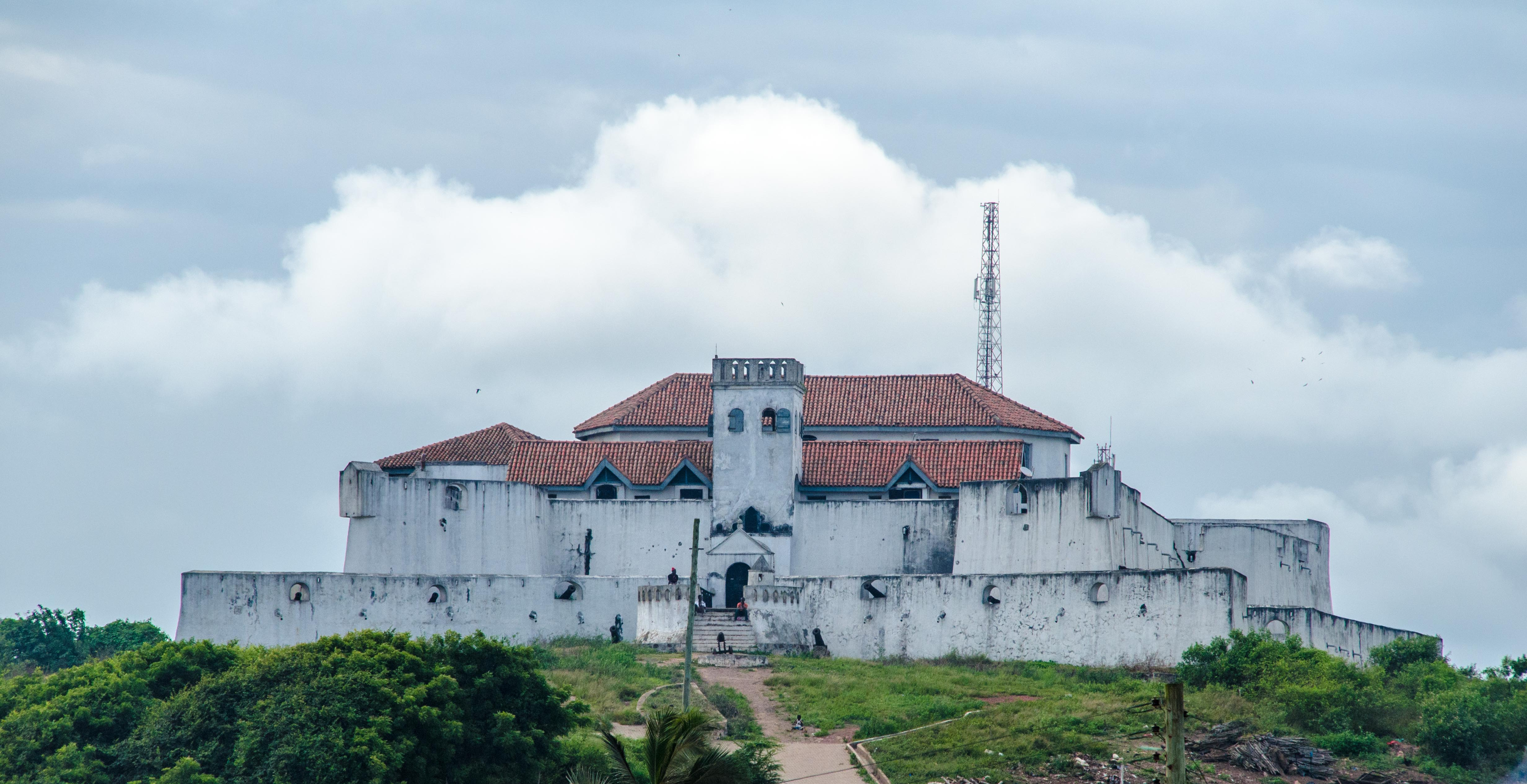
Fort St. Jago

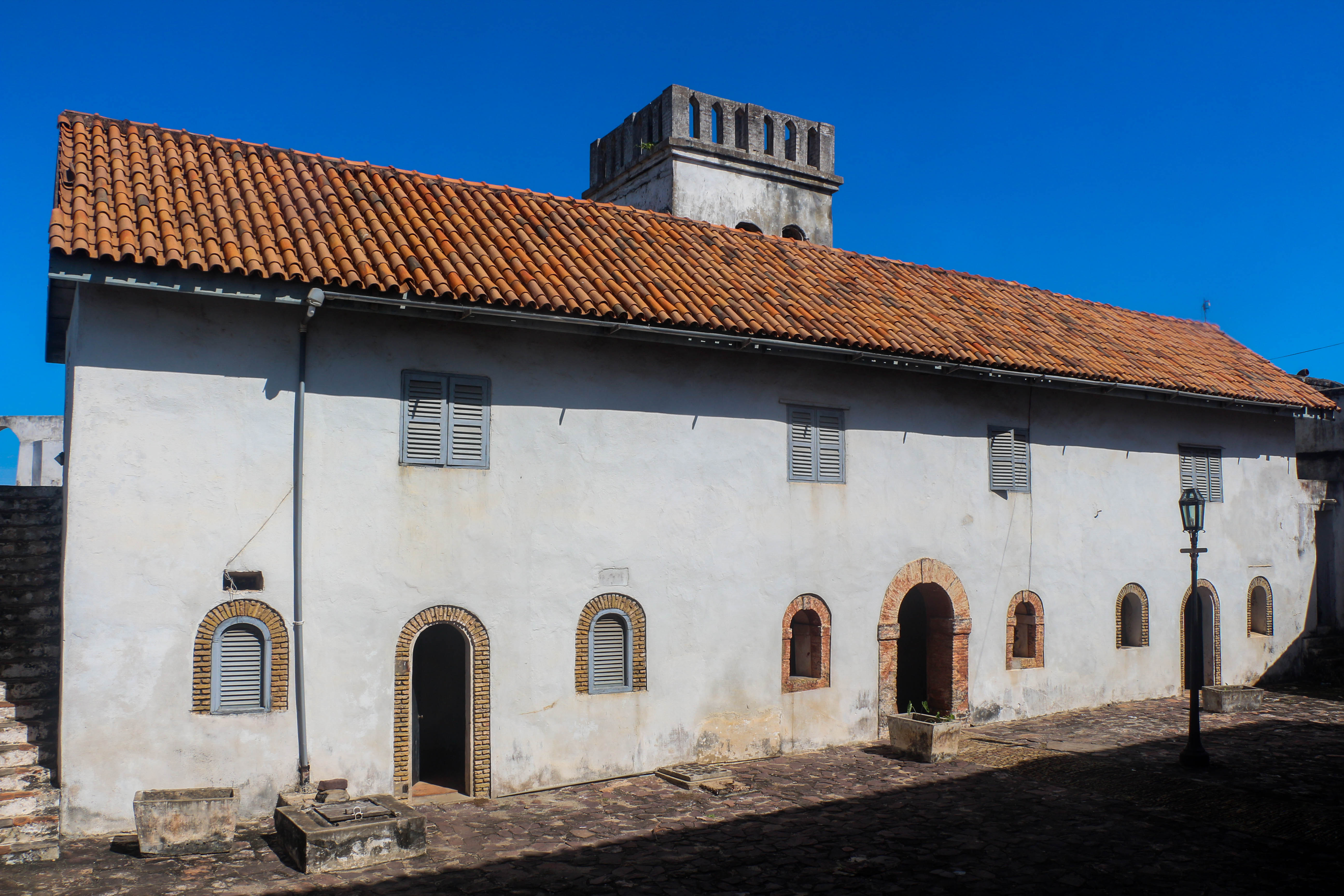
Fort Saint Jago

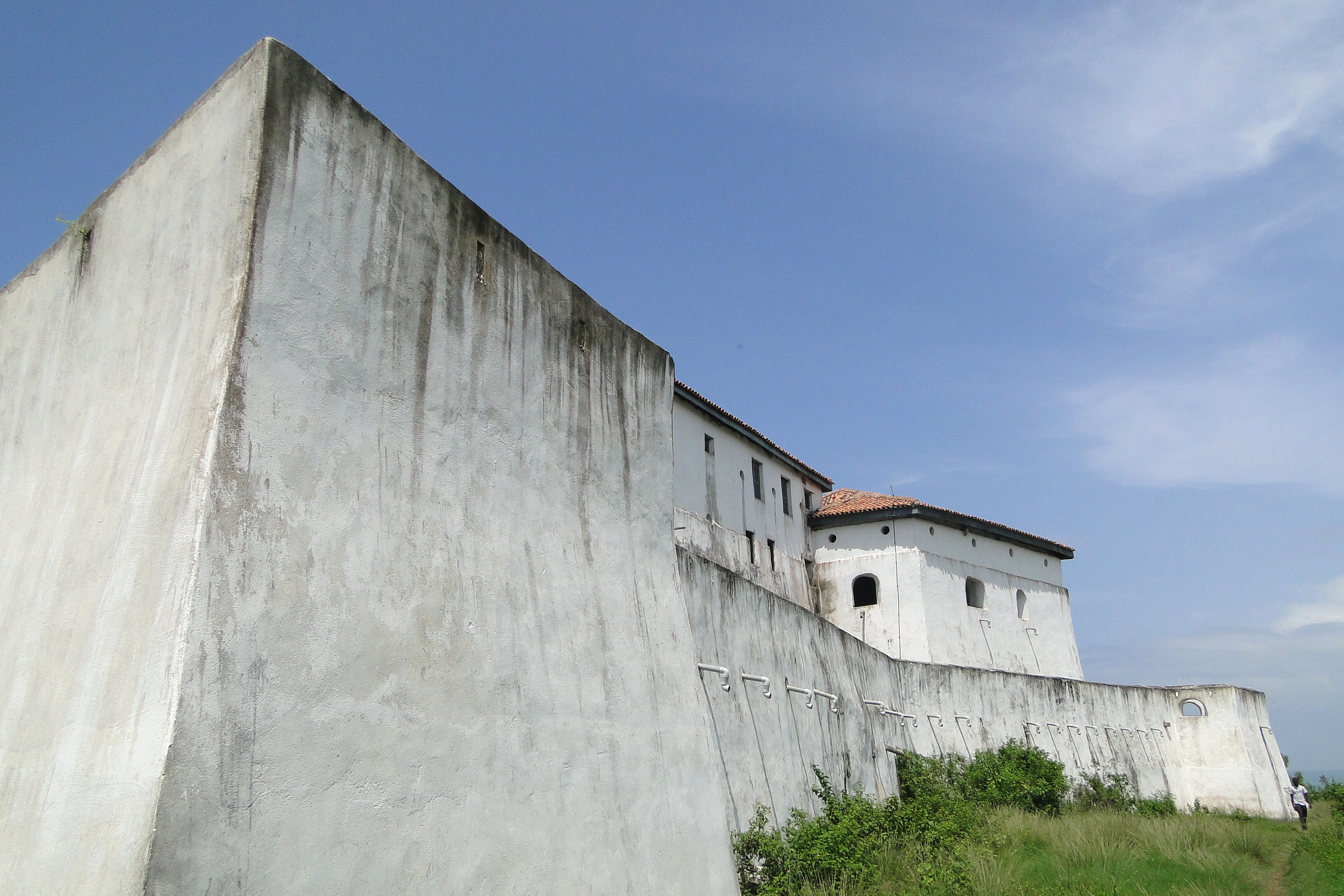
Fort St. Jago

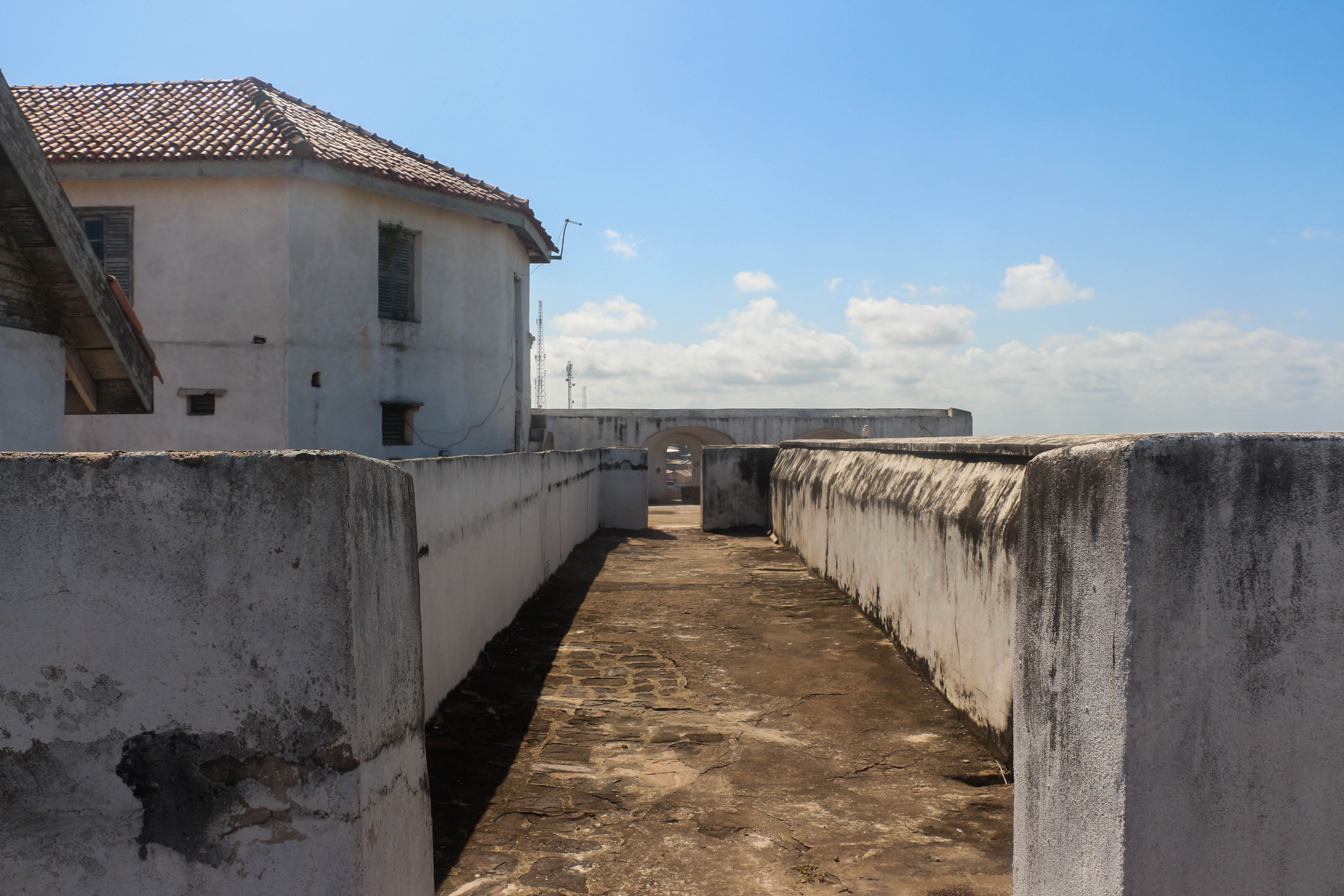
Fort Saint Jago

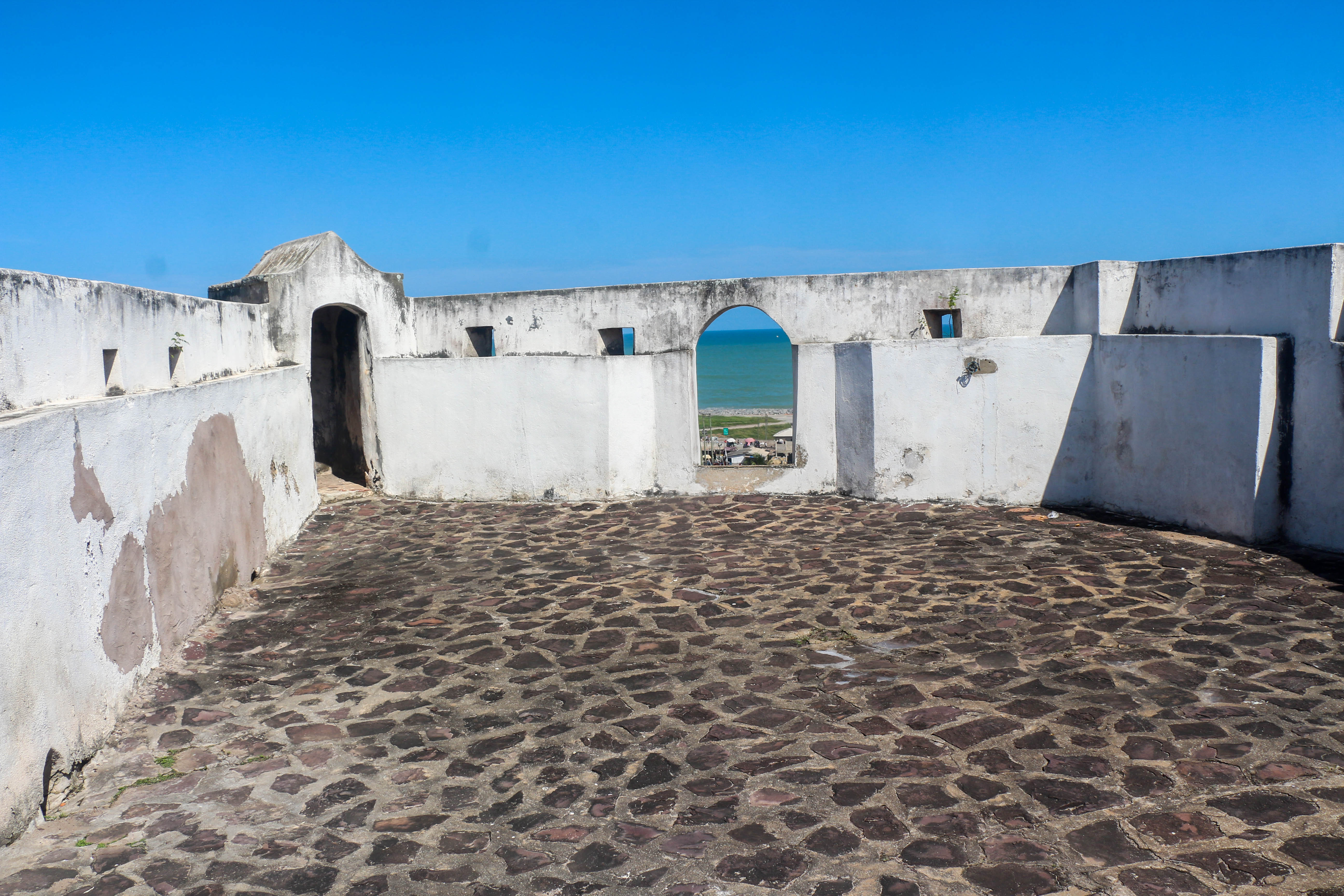
Fort Saint Jago

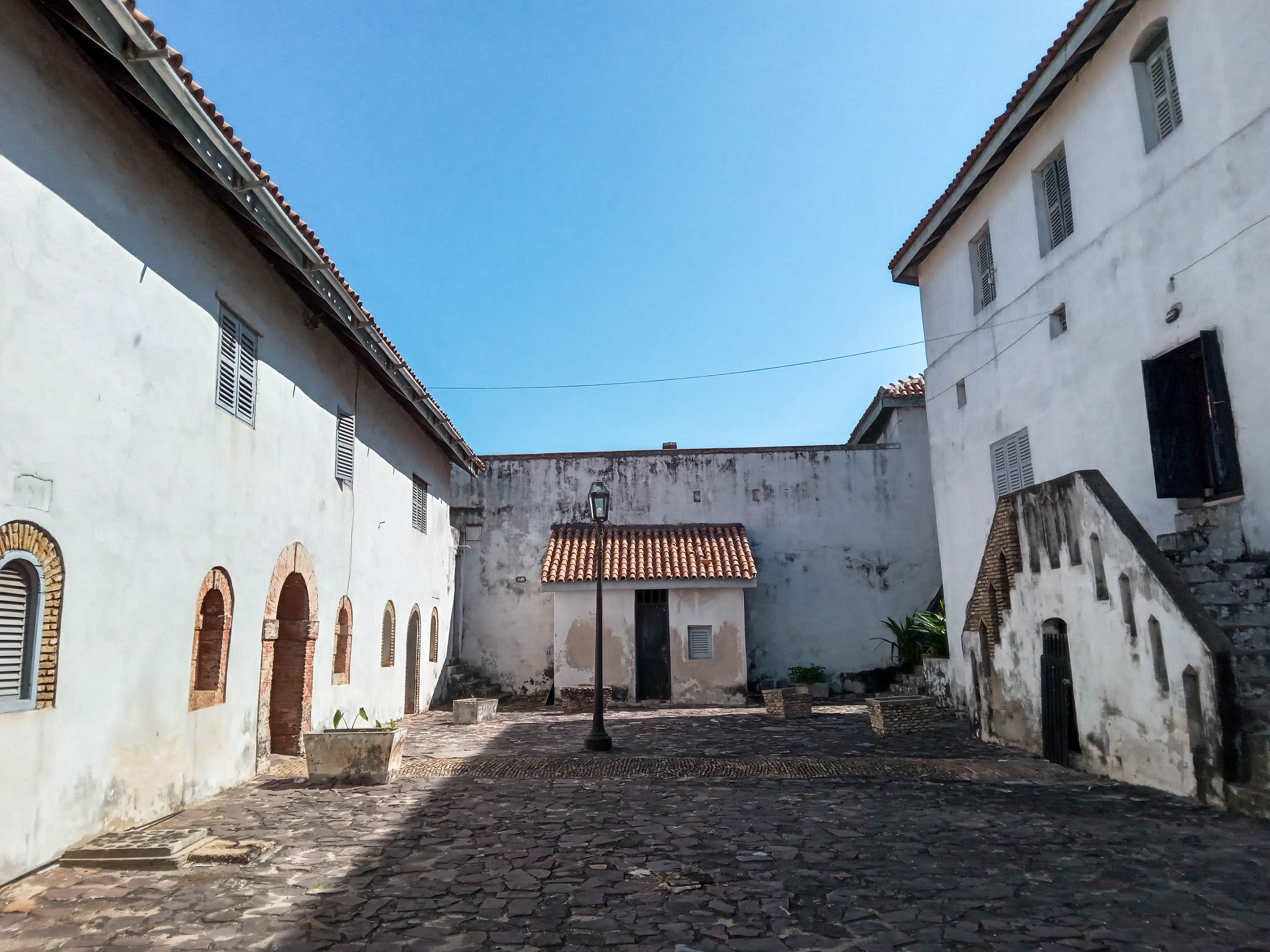
Fort Saint Jago

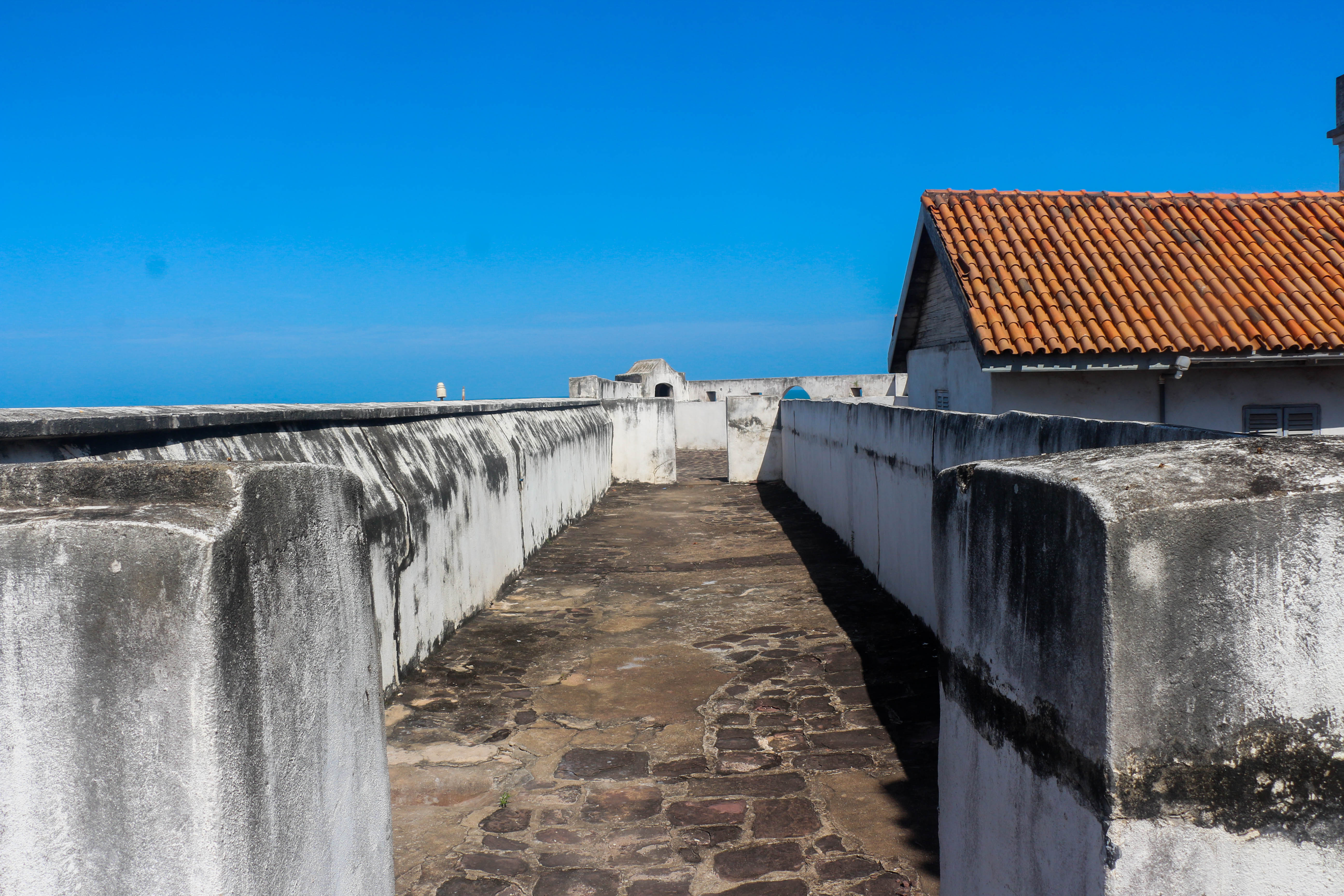
Fort Saint Jago

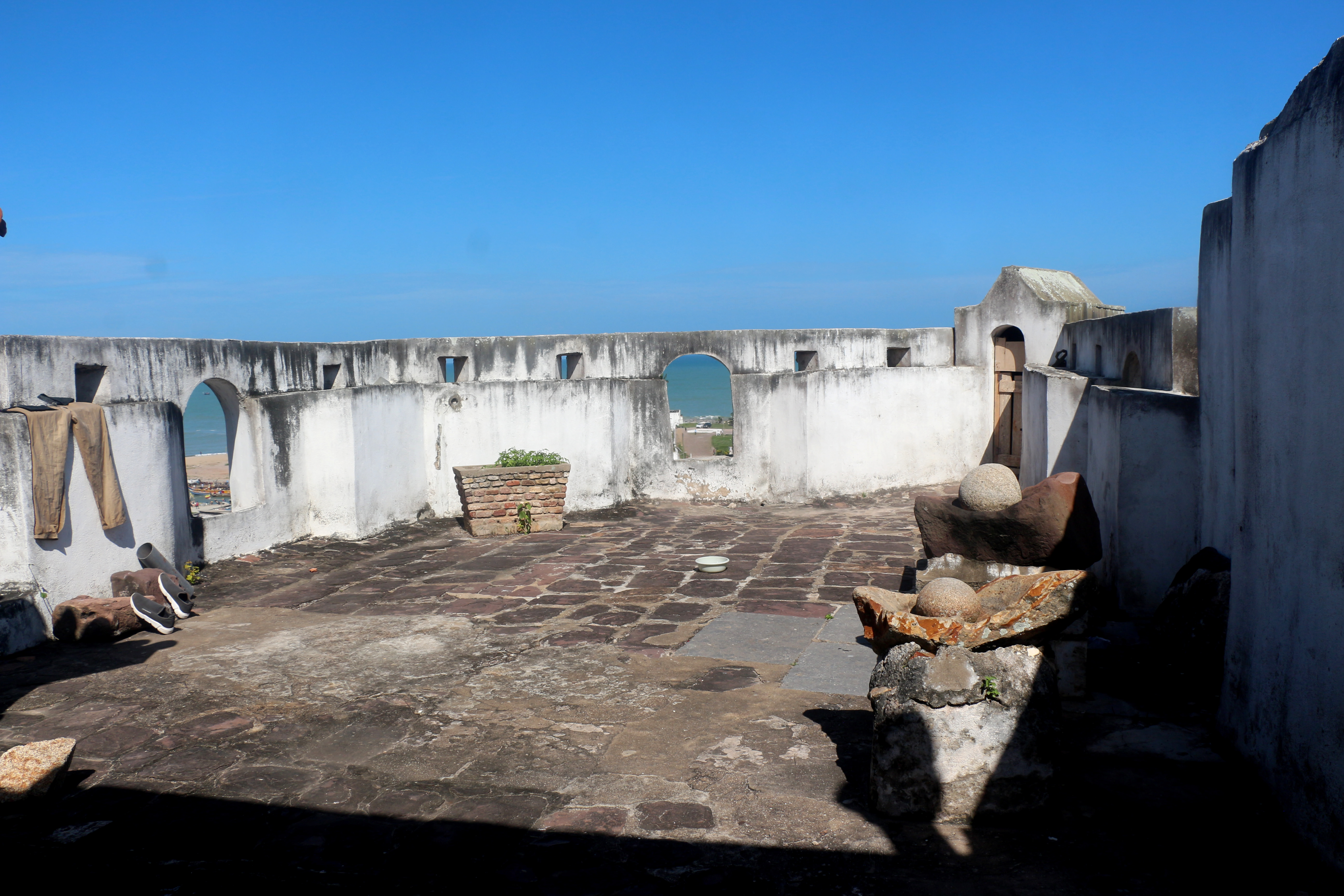
Fort Saint Jago

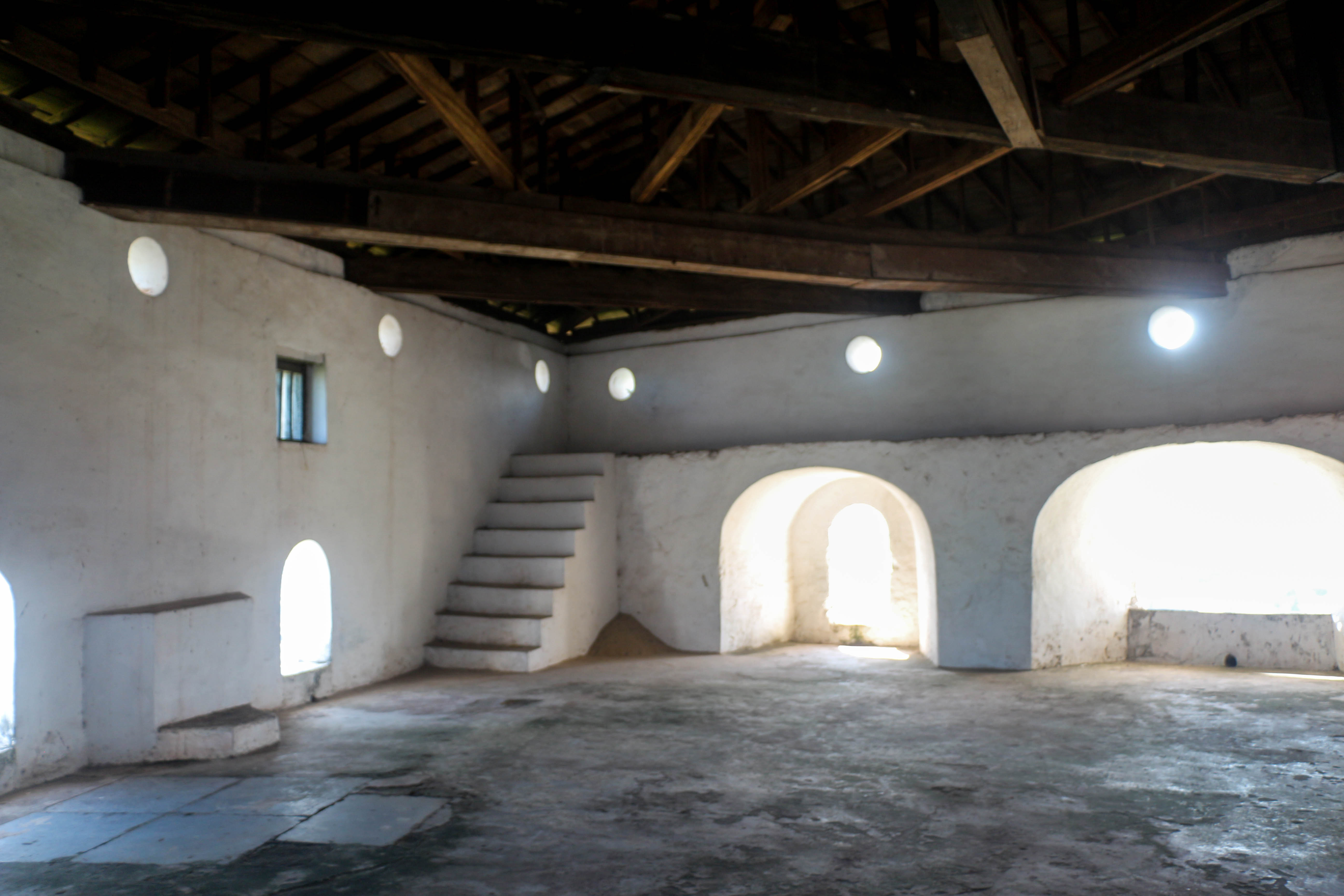
Fort Saint Jago

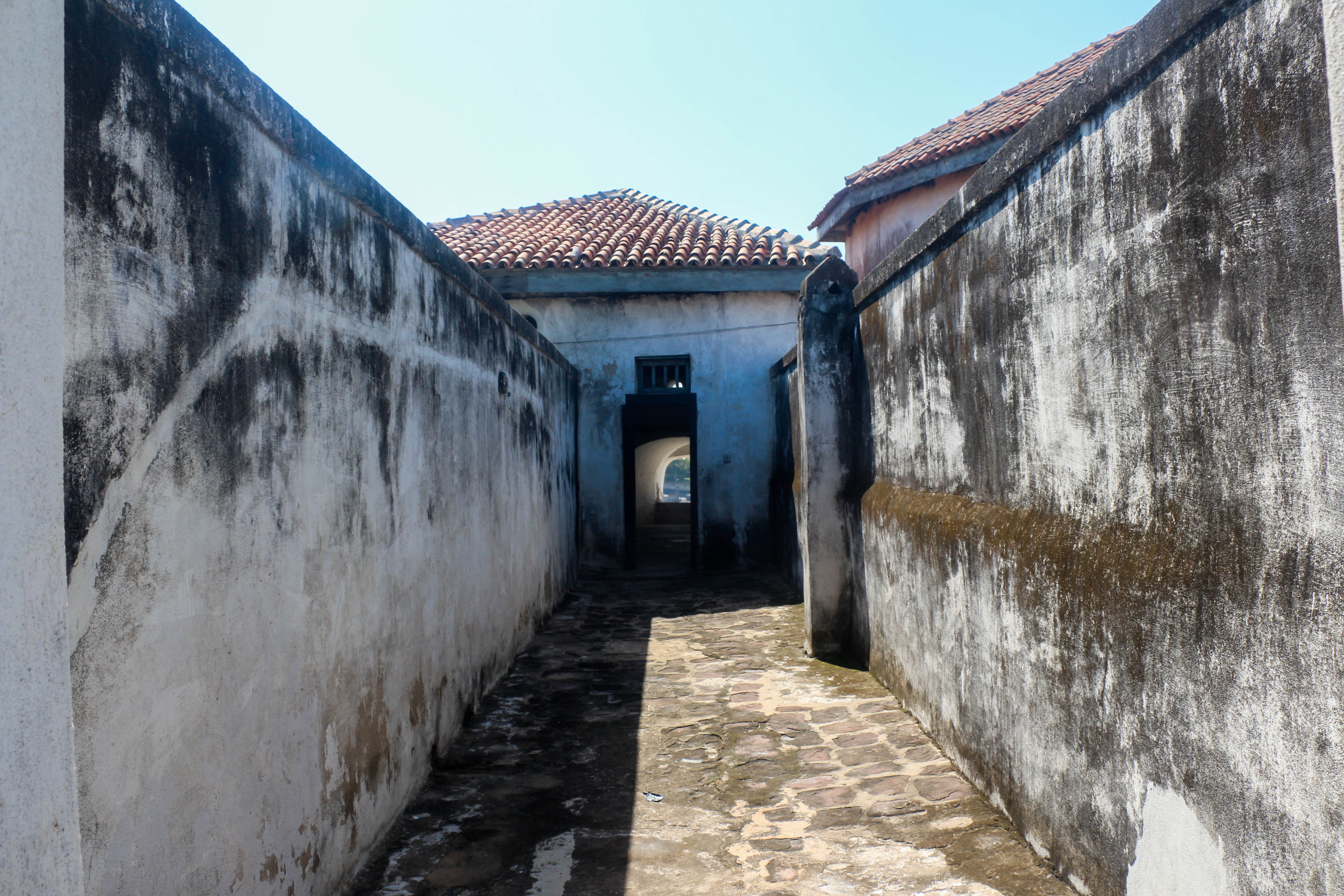
Fort Saint Jago

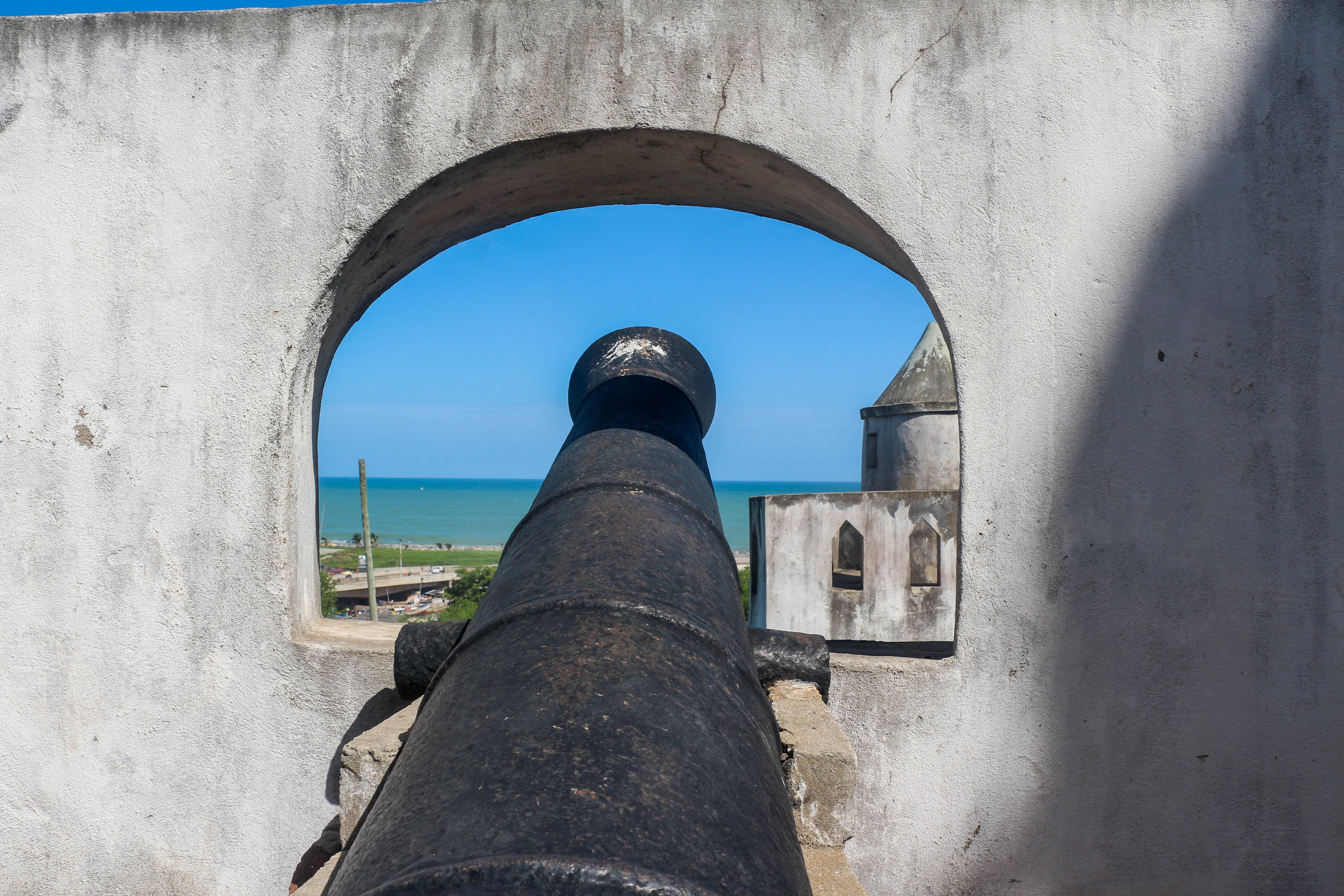
Cannon ball at Fort Saint Jago
