= Mensa Otabil =

Ghanaian theologian, motivational speaker, and entrepreneur (born 1959)

- Born: August 31, 1959 (age 67); Sekondi-Takoradi, Ghana
- Spouse: Joy Otabil (m. 1986)
- Children: 4
- Parent(s): Dinah Otabil; LLoyd Otabil

Ecclesiastical career
- Religion: Christianity
- Church: International Central Gospel Church
- Congregations: Christ Temple, Abossey Okai, Accra & Christ Temple, East, Teshie (Rasta, Bush Road) Accra
- Offices held: Head Pastor, Christ Temple; Chancellor (Central University College)
- Title: Founder, ICGC; Head Pastor, ICGC Christ Temple

Mensa Otabil (born August 31, 1959), is a Ghanaian theologian, motivational speaker, and entrepreneur. He is the founder of International Central Gospel Church headquartered in Accra, Ghana. He is also the founder and Chancellor of Central University College, and CEO of Otabil and Associates, an executive and Leadership Growth Consultancy.

He currently oversees the International Central Gospel churches, which has a network of local assemblies in Ghana, Europe, the United States, Canada and other parts of Africa. He also serves as the senior pastor of Christ Temple, a ministry of the International Central Gospel Church. His work has centered on African issues, although he has spoken internationally at various conferences and churches.

== Personal life ==
Mensa Anamua Otabil was born on 31 August 1959 to Dinah and Lloyd Otabil who lived on Asafo Street in Sekondi, in the Western Region of Ghana. He was the 4th born and the 3rd son in a family of 7 comprising 4 boys and a girl (Effie, Kojo, Ekow, Mensa and Kofi). He married his wife, Joy, in 1986 and they currently have four children: Sompa, Nhyira, Yoofi and Baaba Aseda.

In his early years, his family moved to Baka-ekyir,(Sekondi) where he attended Anglican Primary School near Gyandu Park, Sekondi. He later enrolled in Class 2 at the Community 2 No.3 Primary & Middle School (now Mexico School) in January 1966. This was when his family moved to Tema as a result of his father's promotion to Personnel Manager at GIHOC Boat Yard in Tema.

After passing his Common Entrance Exams, Otabil gained admission to Swedru Secondary School (SWESCO) in 1972 and completed his Ordinary Level Studies in 1977. While in Tema, he worshipped with his mother at St. Alban's Anglican Church, Tema Community 1, and later followed her to the Assemblies of God Church in Tema Community 4. Otabil was a member of the Power House Fellowship in Tema.

His mother died in 1975, and his father in 1976. In the late 1970s, he moved to Roman Ridge and later to Kanda in Accra where he joined the Kanda fellowship. Around that time, he also gained employment with the Audio Visual Department of the Ministry of Information. It was there that he met and worked with Edwin Donkor, who was later to become a pastor at ICGC. On 26 February 1984, he started the International Central Gospel Church ministry at the Kanda Cluster of Schools, and later moved to Sal Valley School, also in the Kanda area.

He serves as General Overseer of the Church and Senior Pastor of Christ Temple, Abossey Okai in Accra and Christ Temple - East, Teshie Rasta - Bush Road also in Accra. Otabil has been awarded honorary doctorate degrees for his work in various fields. He was also a recipient of a Millennium Excellence Award. In 2007, he was honoured by the Government of Ghana with a state award, Order of the Volta (Religion).

== Awards and recognition ==
In March 2018, Otabil, with Kofi Annan and Martin Amidu made it to the list of 100 Most Reputable Africans. The list also featured individuals from diverse sectors including Leadership, Entertainment, Advocacy, Education and Business.

In 2015, Ghanaians voted him as the "Most Influential Person in Ghana", according to a list published by ETV Ghana.

He was, in 2013, considered the twenty-fourth most influential Ghanaian, in a poll run by ETV Ghana.

== Television and radio ==
Otabil presents a radio and television program called Living Word where he addresses life issues such as religion, education, economic development, family life, and politics.

The program has been broadcast by several radio and television networks in Ghana.

The show also runs on Matthew Ashimolowo's network KICC-TV, which reaches homes across Europe and into North Africa and parts of the Middle East.

== Politics and social views ==
Otabil has been cited in numerous Ghanaian news media for his pragmatic views on governance and Africa as a whole.

He has been accused for being politically biased and affiliated to NPP (a political party in Ghana). In March 2018, former president, John Dramani Mahama launched a similar subtle jab on Otabil.

The claims have been denied by officials of the New patriotic party (NPP) and former president John Agyekum Kuffour who believes Mensa Otabil is not a politician, but rather a pragmatist who likes to talk about the realities of the day.

== Capital Bank saga ==
Otabil was chairman of the collapsed Capital Bank. Otabil is said to have led the receival of inappropriate money grants from the Bank on behalf of parties related to him which contributed to the collapse. Sections of Ghanaians have called for sanctioning of Directors of the Bank found to have played a lead role in its collapse. However, in December 2018, Otabil filed his defence against a suit initiated by Vish Ashiagbor and Eric Nana Nipah of PricewaterhouseCoopers, who are receivers of the defunct Capital Bank (Ghana). The Plaintiffs, Messrs Vish Ashiagbor and Eric Nana Nipah from PricewaterhouseCoopers, said the bank's collapse was a “direct result of defendants’ “misgovernance” and “willful” breaches of banking regulations. Pastor Otabil in his defence filed at the court said that the board he chaired did not make any misrepresentation to the Bank of Ghana as regards the payment of the minimum capital required for the granting of the requisite banking license - which was one of the issues in the suit against him and other directors.

Otabil also explained in his defence that the debt of a total of GHȼ482 million found on the books of Capital Bank (Ghana) did not result from the negligence of the directors. He said it was the result of the plaintiff having identified various outstanding or impaired legacy assets traceable to the microfinance days of First Capital Plus which later became Capital Bank (Ghana).

== Publications ==
Otabil has published several motivational, leadership, and devotional books:

- Buy the Future: Learning to Negotiate for a Future Better Than Your Present
- Devotional: Living Word

e-Books:

- 5 Steps to Answer Prayer
- Anointed to Start and Finish
- Goal Setting & Goal Getting
- How to Be Filled with the Holy Spirit
- Turning your Weakness into Strength
