= Bill Puplampu =

Vice Chancellor of the Central University

Bill Buenar Puplampu
- Occupation: Vice Chancellor of the Central University
- Years active: November 2017 to date
- Title: Professor
- Board member of: Merchant Bank, Ghana

Academic background
- Education: Presbyterian Boys' Senior High School
- Alma mater: University of Ghana; University of East London

Academic work
- Discipline: Occupational psychology
- Institutions: University of Westminster; University of Ghana Business School; Central University (Ghana)
- Website: https://www.central.edu.gh/76

Notes
- Fellow of the Ghana Academy of Arts and Sciences

Bill Buenar Puplampu is a Ghanaian academic, occupational psychologist and the current Vice Chancellor of the Central University.

== Early life and education ==
Puplampu completed his secondary school education at the Presbyterian Boys' Senior High School where he obtained his GCE A-Level. He proceeded to the University of Ghana where he obtained a Bachelor's degree in Psychology in 1985. He then went on to the Polytechnic of East London (now University of East London) in the United Kingdom where he completed the Master's degree in Occupational psychology in 1990. He completed a Ph. D. at the University of East London in Organizational Behaviour and International Human Resource Management in 1994. He studied at the Executive Institute of McGill University in Canada in 1998. He also studied Higher Education Management at the DAAD/DIES Osnabrück University in Osnabrück in Lower Saxony, Germany in 2012.

== Career ==
Puplampu started off with a part-time teaching job at the University of East London. He later had a full-time lecturer position at the University of Westminster also in London. He returned to Ghana to work at the University of Ghana Business School where he became the head of the Department of Organisation and Human Resource Management and later Associate Professor. He has served as an external examiner at the Makarere University in Uganda and in South Africa at Rhodes University, University of Pretoria and North West University. He has been a visiting scholar at the Pan-African University in Nigeria. He was the Chair of the Executive MBA Programme Committee and Editor of the Business School’s Academic Journal. In 2016, he delivered his inaugural lecture at the University of Ghana on “Towards an Organisational Revolution in Africa – Calibrated Culture, Engaged Leadership and Structured Health – Musings of an Organizational Psychologist”.

In 2010, he was appointed Dean of the Central Business School. He went on to become the Pro Vice Chancellor (Academic Affairs) in 2015. In November 2017, he became the Vice Chancellor of the Central University.

== Other positions held ==
He is a Chartered Psychologist and Associate Fellow of the British Psychological Society and a member of the Hamburg Global University Leaders' Council. He was elected to fellowship of the Ghana Academy of Arts and Sciences in 2018. Puplampu was an Independent Director on the Board of Merchant Bank, Ghana.

== Research ==
Puplampu's research interests have focused on employee motivation, organisational culture and corporate leadership. He was joint lead of the "six year Research Culture project looking into research culture in universities in six African countries" with Stella Nkomo.

== Family ==
Puplampu is married to Christiana Okang. His son Vivaldo also graduated in Psychology at the University of East London while his daughter Xavia studied International Tourism Management there. Another daughter of his, Dionne also studied Psychology. Tragically, Vivaldo succumbed to multiple sclerosis.

== Publications ==
He has published a number of articles including:

1. Puplumpu, Bill Buenar (1 January 1993). Differential perceptions of expatriates: what are the mediating variables?; a study of UK expatriates in Ghana. University of East London.
2. Puplampu, Bill Buenar (2 October 2017). "Return to Africa to Mine - An African Understanding of Employee Motivation in Africa: Sankofa". Africa Journal of Management. 3 (3–4): 213–235. doi:10.1080/23322373.2017.1375811. ISSN 2332-2373. S2CID 134111089.

He is also co-editor of the following books:

1. Lituchy, Terri R.; Punnett, Jane; Puplampu, Bill Buenar, eds. (2013). Management in Africa : Macro and Micro Perspectives. New York: Routledge. ISBN 978-1138108547.
2. Jain, Aditya Kailash; Puplampu, Bill Buenar; Amponsah-Tawiah, Kwesi; Andreou, Nicholas John Artin, eds. (2012). Occupational Safety & Health and Corporate Social Responsibility In Africa: Repositioning Corporate Responsibility Towards National Development (PDF). Bedfordshire, UK: Cranfield University Press. ISBN 978-1907413193.
3. Kazeroony, Hamid (14 April 2016). Kazeroony, Hamid H.; du Plessis, Yvonne; Puplampu, Bill Buenar (eds.). Sustainable Management Development in Africa: Building Capabilities to Serve African Organizations. New York, NY: Routledge. ISBN 978-1-317-50096-4.

== See also ==
- Central University
- University of Ghana Business School
