= Miotso =

Suburb of Accra, Ghana

Coordinates: 5°45′N 0°05′E

Miotso is a suburb of Accra, the capital of Ghana. Miotso can be found along the Prampram Road.
