= Dawhenya =

- Town
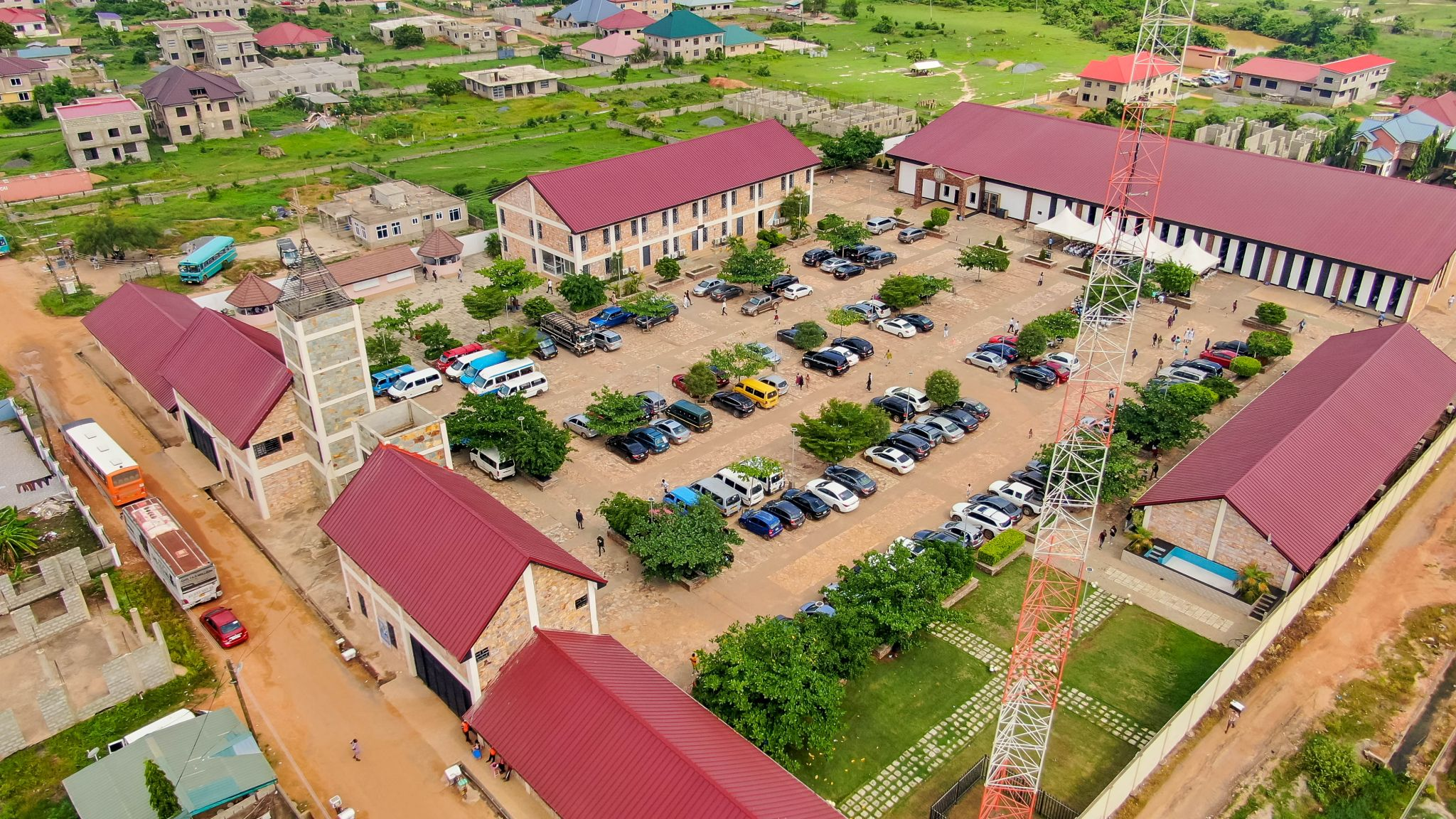
- East End City Church in Dawhenya
- Country: Ghana
- Region: Greater Accra Region
- District: Ningo Prampram
- Time zone: GMT
  - Summer (DST): GMT

Dawhenya is a town in the Greater Accra Region of Ghana near Tema and Prampram.
