= Tema Community 1 =

- Interactive map of Tema Community 1
- Coordinates: 5.6698°N 0.01657°E
- Country: Ghana
- Region: Greater Accra Region

Tema Community 1 is a residential area in Tema in the Greater Accra Region of Ghana. Community One is the central part of Tema which trade and transportation is located. This place serves as a link to the harbour.

This part of Tema is known for the Our Lady of Mercy Senior High School. The school is a second cycle institution. The community was created by the first President of Ghana, Kwame Nkrumah.
