= International Central Gospel Church =

Ghanaian charismatic church

- Headquarters: Abossey Okai, Accra, Ghana
- Founder: Pastor Dr. Mensa Otabil
- Origin: 26 February 1984; 42 years ago
- Tertiary institutions: Central University
- Official website: https://www.centralgospel.com/

The International Central Gospel Church (ICGC) is an evangelical, Charismatic Christian church headquartered at Teshie in Accra, Ghana. It is considered to be one of the fastest growing Charismatic churches in Ghana, having a church attendance close to 50,000. The headquarters is located in Achimota, Accra Ghana. It now has a new ultramodern church complex called ICGC Christ Temple East at Teshie on the Rasta Road.

== History ==
The International Central Gospel Church was founded by Ghanaian theologian, Pastor Dr. Mensa Otabil. The church was officially inaugurated on 26 February 1984, in Accra. It was the second Charismatic church in Ghana, after the Action Chapel International founded in 1979.

== Social responsibility ==
The church has made significant socially responsible contribution to Ghana. The Central University College, a privately owned co-ed tertiary educational institution, is owned by the church. It is currently the biggest private university in Ghana. In 1988, the church started a scholarship scheme called Central Aid to finance the education of selected needy students in pre-tertiary educational institutions. Central Aid is one of the largest non-governmental educational scholarship schemes in Ghana. Every year through an annual charity event called 'Gold, Frankincense and Myrrh' the church donates to the Children's Cancer Unit at Korle Bu and since 2011, over 1500 children have benefitted from the annual donations made by the ICGC.

== Projects ==
- Life Walk

Life Walk is a social event held annually by the International Central Gospel Church to promote healthy living. Life walk was started in 2005.

- Body Temple Gym

Body Temple is an ultra-modern gym and sports facility at the church's premises.
