= John Atta Mills =

President of Ghana from 2009 to 2012

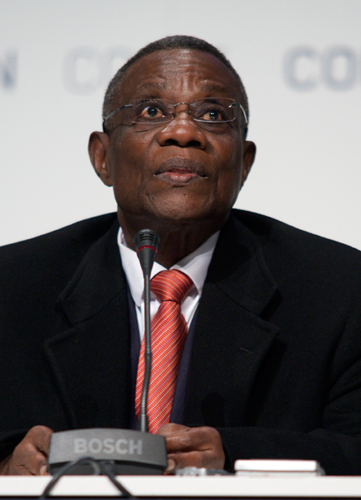
- Mills in 2009

11th President of Ghana
- In office 7 January 2009 – 24 July 2012
- Vice President: John Mahama
- Preceded by: John Kufuor
- Succeeded by: John Mahama

3rd Vice President of Ghana
- In office 7 January 1997 – 7 January 2001
- President: Jerry Rawlings
- Preceded by: Kow Nkensen Arkaah
- Succeeded by: Aliu Mahama

Personal details
- Born: John Evans Fiifi Atta Mills; 21 July 1944 Tarkwa, then part of the Colony of the Gold Coast
- Died: 24 July 2012 (aged 68) Accra, Ghana
- Resting place: Asomdwee Park, Accra, Ghana
- Party: National Democratic Congress
- Spouse: Ernestina Naadu Mills (née Botchway)
- Children: Sam Kofi Atta Mills
- Education: University of Ghana (LLB); London School of Economics (LLM); University of London (PhD)
- Notable Awards: Fulbright Scholar; Glo-CAF Platinum Award; Lifetime Africa Achievement Prize; The Fritz Redlich Alumni Award
- Occupation: Law Professor
- Institution: University of Ghana, Legon
- Field: Tax law

John Evans Fiifi Atta Mills (21 July 1944 – 24 July 2012) was a Ghanaian politician and legal scholar who served as the 11th president of Ghana from 2009 until his death in 2012. He was inaugurated on 7 January 2009, having defeated the governing party candidate Nana Akufo-Addo in the 2008 Ghanaian presidential election. He was previously the third vice president from 1997 to 2001 under President Jerry Rawlings, and he contested unsuccessfully in the 2000 and 2004 presidential elections as the candidate of the National Democratic Congress (NDC). He was the first, and to date, the only Ghanaian head of state to die in office.

== Early life ==
Mills was born on 21 July 1944 in Tarkwa, in the Western Region of Ghana. His parents were John Atta Mills Sr., an educationist, who taught at the Komenda Teacher Training College and Mercy Dawson Amoah. He was the second child (and first son) among seven siblings. A member of the Fante ethnic group, he hailed from the town of Ekumfi Otuam in the Mfantsiman East constituency of the Central Region of Ghana. He had his primary and middle school education at Huni Valley Methodist Primary School and Komenda Methodist Middle School respectively. He then proceeded to the prestigious Achimota School for his secondary education, where he completed the Ordinary and Advanced-Level Certificates in 1961 and 1963 respectively, and the University of Ghana, Legon, where he completed a bachelor of law degree, LLB and a professional law certificate in 1967.

Mills studied at the London School of Economics and Political Science where he obtained an LLM in 1968 and earned a PhD in Law at the School of Oriental and African Studies School of Law, part of the federal University of London, after completing his doctoral thesis in the field of taxation and economic development in 1971 at the age of 27.

== Early career ==
Mills' first formal teaching assignment was as a lecturer at the Faculty of Law at the University of Ghana. He spent close to twenty-five years teaching at Legon and other institutions of higher learning. In 1971, he was selected for the Fulbright Scholar programme at Stanford Law School in the US.

He returned to his homeland, Ghana, at the end of the international educational exchange fellowship to work at his alma mater, the University of Ghana, for 25 years. He became a visiting professor at Temple University (Philadelphia, USA), with two stints from 1978 to 1979, and 1986 to 1987. He was also a visiting lecturer at Leiden University in the Netherlands from 1985 to 1986. During this period, he authored several publications relating to taxation in the 1970s and 1980s.

Outside of his academic pursuits, Mills was the Acting Commissioner of Ghana's Internal Revenue Service from 1988 to 1993 under President Jerry John Rawlings, and the substantive Commissioner from 1993 to 1996. By 1992, he had become an Associate Professor of Law at the University of Ghana. In 2002, he was a visiting scholar at the Liu Institute for Global Issues at the University of British Columbia in Vancouver, British Columbia through a joint Canadian International Development Agency(CIDA) – International Development Research Centre (IDRC) fellowship programme.

== Politics ==
=== Vice President of Ghana ===
For the inaugural presidential election in 1992, the National Convention Party (NCP) had formed an alliance with the National Democratic Congress (NDC). Former Provisional National Defence Council (PNDC) Chairman, and leader of Ghana, Flight-Lieutenant Jerry John Rawlings chose the NCP leader, Kow Nkensen Arkaah, as his running-mate for vice-president. Having been elected in the 1992 election, Arkaah served between 1992 and 1996.

However, on 29 January 1996, the NCP broke with the NDC. Arkaah with the National Convention Party formed the Great Alliance with the New Patriotic Party and was subsequently nominated as the running mate of John Agyekum Kufuor to challenge the National Democratic Congress. Rawlings selected Mills for the vacated Vice-Presidency in his bid for re-election to a second term in the election and was re-elected to his second term in office, serving from 1996 to 2000. In his capacity as vice-president, he served as the Chairman of the Police Council of Ghana and the Chairman of the Economic Management Team.

=== Presidential elections ===
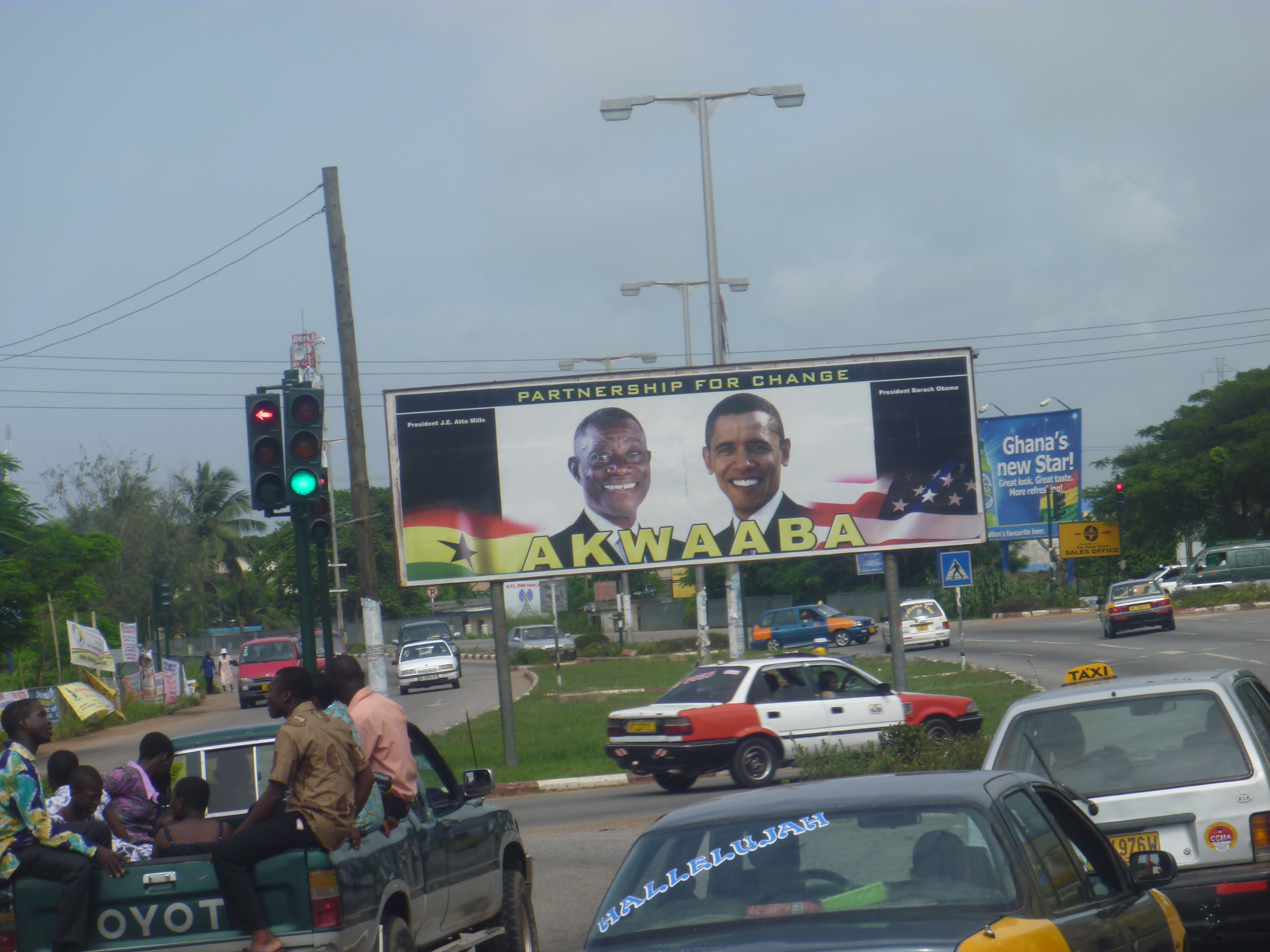
President Mills featured on a billboard with Former US President Barack Obama

In 2000, Mills became the NDC's candidate for the 2000 presidential election after Rawlings had served his constitutionally mandated terms as president. The main rival for Mills' own bid for the presidency was John Agyekum Kufuor, who was running as the candidate for the opposition New Patriotic Party (NPP). In the heat of the 2000 presidential campaign, Mills was roundly criticized for statements that if elected he would consult with Rawlings daily. In the first round, held on 7 December 2000, Mills gained 44.8% of the vote, Kufuor won the first round with 48.4%, thus forcing a second round. On 28 December 2000, Kufuor defeated Mills with 56.9% of the vote and was sworn in as president on 7 January 2001.

In December 2002, Mills was elected by his party to be its flag bearer and lead them into the 2004 election. He was, however, defeated again by incumbent president John Agyekum Kufuor, who received 52.45% of the vote on the first ballot.

On 21 December 2006, he became the NDC's candidate for the 2008 presidential election, winning his party's ticket by an 81.4% result (1,362 votes), far ahead of his opponents, Ekwow Spio-Garbrah, Alhaji Mahama Iddrisu, and Eddie Annan. In the 2008 election, John Agyekum Kufuor was no longer eligible to run as president, having served two terms. It was during this time that the term Better Ghana Agenda was coined. During the 2008 elections, in an attempt to change the public perception at the time that he would be a political lackey of his former mentor, Jerry Rawlings when elected, he distanced himself from his previous comments made in the 2000 campaign .

Mills' main opponent from the New Patriotic Party was now Nana Akufo-Addo. Mills ran under the campaign slogan of "A Better Man for a Better Ghana," on a platform of change. He said: "People are complaining. They're saying that their standard of living has deteriorated these past eight years. So if Ghana is a model of growth, it's not translating into something people can feel." The result of the first ballot had Akufo-Addo in front with 49.13% of the vote to Mills' 47.92%, however, a run-off second round of voting was needed. The second round of voting took place on 28 December 2008. The result was a slim lead held by Mills, but due to problems with the distribution of ballots, the Tain District constituency, located in the Brong-Ahafo Region, was forced to vote again on 2 January 2009. The final result was a victory by Mills with 50.23% of the vote to Akufo-Addo's 49.77%. Mills became the third president of the 4th Republic of Ghana. Self-described as a social democrat who believed in the concept of social welfare espoused by Kwame Nkrumah (independent Ghana's first leader), Mills embraced a political platform that was more comprehensive and less divisive than that of either Nkrumah or Rawlings. John Atta Mills was sworn in as president on 7 January 2009 in a peaceful transition after Akufo-Addo was narrowly defeated. His persistence and determination paid off when he won the 2008 presidential poll.

=== Presidency ===
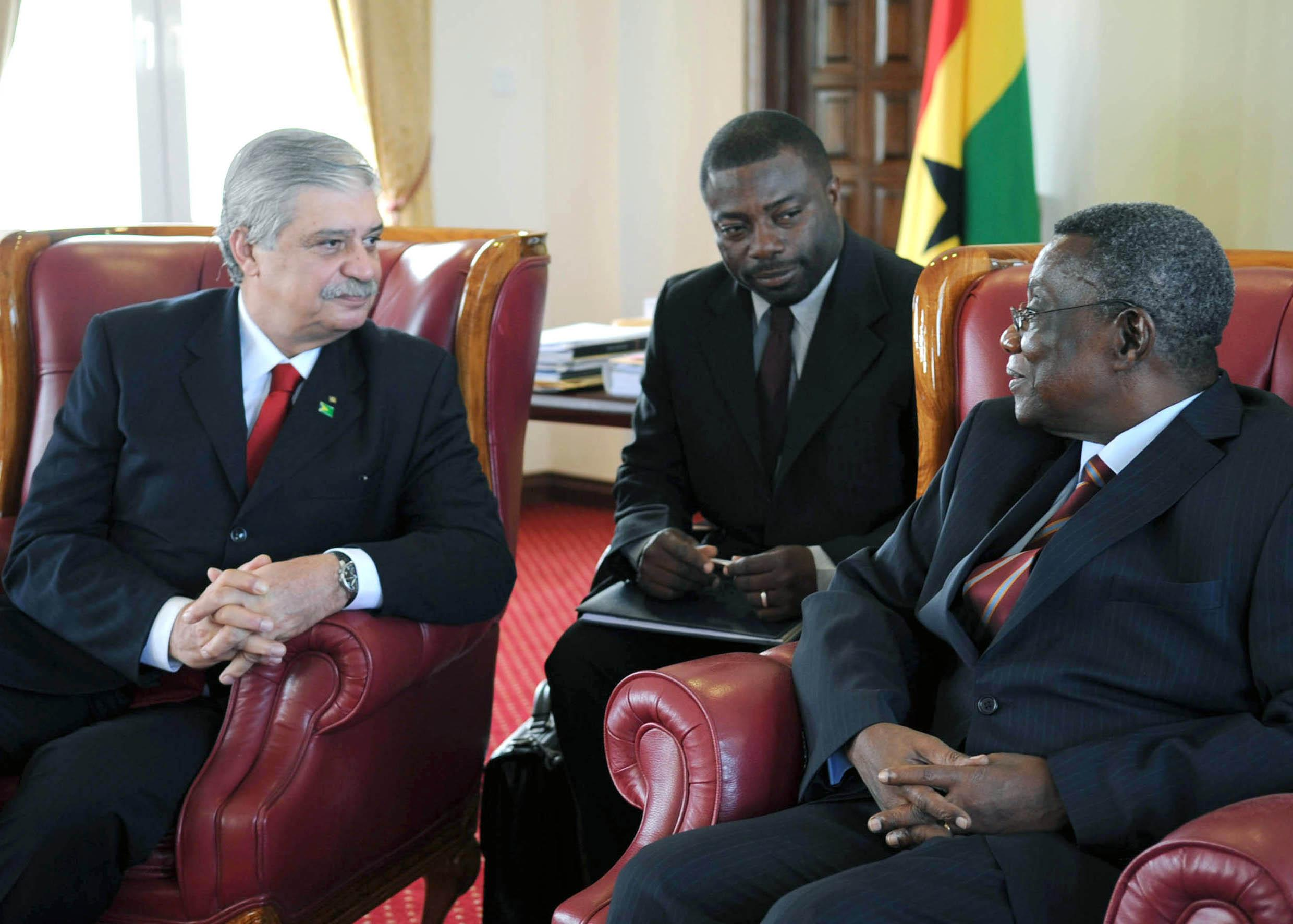
President Mills on a meeting with the Minister of Development of Brazil, Miguel Jorge

Amongst his accomplishments as president was presiding over and initiating Ghana's first ever foray into oil production, after oil was discovered in commercial quantities under his predecessor, John Kufuor. He was also credited for growth in other sectors of the economy during his tenure. He was the first incumbent president to be re-nominated for an election for his party via a primary. Some of the monumental achievements chalked during his term of office include:

==== Economy ====
Under Mills, Ghana's stable economy experienced sustained reduced inflation leading to the attainment of single digit inflation of about 8.4% (one of the lowest inflation rates Ghana had attained in 42 years i.e. period between 1970 and 2012 as well as the lowest since June 1992 just before the start of Ghana's Fourth Republic) from a high of 18.1% in December 2008. This is indicative of prudent fiscal, monetary and other austerity policy measures that characterised his presidency to put the economy in healthy shape. The Ghanaian currency, the Cedi also stabilised as a result of these policies. In 2011, Ghana was the fastest growing economy in the world at 20.15% for the first half of the year and 14.4% at the end of the financial year according to the International Monetary Fund and EconomyWatch.com. Moreover, Ghana's budget deficit was reduced to 2% of the Gross Domestic Product during his tenure compared to 14.5% of GDP in 2008, just before he was elected as the President of Ghana. There was also a huge improvement in Ghana's gross international reserves and foreign direct investments (FDI) highlighting exceptional macroeconomic performance. The Mills government also implemented the Single Spine Salary system which increased compensation levels of all public sector workers. In a bid to improve the efficiency in revenue collection, Mills established the Ghana Revenue Authority which integrated Value Added Tax (VAT), Customs Excise and Preventive Service (CEPS) and Internal Revenue Service (IRS). Under his governance, Ghana met three out of the four primary convergence criteria for the proposed common currency, Eco of the West African Monetary Zone. These accomplishments led to renewed domestic and foreign investor confidence in Ghana's economy. During Mills' time in office, Ghana was adjudged the best place for doing business in West Africa and best West African performer in access to credit according to the 2011 World Bank Doing Business global rankings.

In 2008, Mills made refurbishing the Kotokoraba Market in Cape Coast a major feature of his presidential campaign. As President, he sought financing for the refurbishment from China.

==== Education ====
There was also an increase in the capitation grants (government subsidies towards public education) under Mills. The government also introduced a programme to provide free school uniforms to deprived communities while providing over 100,000 laptops or notebooks to school children to facilitate the learning process in a highly technological world. An initiative to provide free exercise books started under Mills. More than 23 million books were distributed. His government also expanded the school feeding programme to include 230 more schools. Government paid the full tuition for all teachers pursuing further studies through distance learning. A sustained program involving the Ministry of Education, the GETFUND, and resources allocated by the various District Assemblies have begun to ensure the elimination of schools under trees and provide all schools in the country with decent classroom infrastructure. Out of the 4,320 schools under trees, almost 1,700 schools under trees were eliminated across the country. The Mills administration also started a program to re-equip science resource centres in all districts of the country to enhance the teaching and learning of science. Two new specialized public universities were established during his tenure: the University of Health and Allied Sciences in the Volta Region and the University of Energy and Natural Resources in the Brong-Ahafo Region. As president, Mills established a working relationship between the Masters in Development Practice program (MDP) at the University of Winnipeg, Canada and the University for Development Studies Ghana, leading to a joint initiative on the study of development practice for Indigenous and traditional societies.

==== Health ====
During his term of office, the Mills government provided a facelift to many teaching, regional and district hospitals across the country by upgrading old facilities and providing newer ones such as more high-tech equipment and more beds in hospitals, particularly at the Tamale Teaching Hospital. His government also built several polyclinics to increase access to healthcare. The government also scaled up the National Ambulance Service to cover all districts in the nation. Increased collaboration between stakeholders led higher patronage of the National Health Insurance Scheme. Utilization of the scheme rose by 75%.

==== Governance and international relations ====
True to his promise to reduce the number of Ministerial appointees and run a lean government, the number of Ministers was significantly reduced from 87 of the previous Kufuor NPP government to 73 (a reduction of 16%) in the Mills-led government. It was projected that approximately $4 million was saved annually by this bold decision to run a small government. The hundreds of Special Assistants, Presidential Staffers and Spokespersons were also eliminated to improve fiscal efficiency. He commissioned a review of the 1992 Constitution of Ghana in a bid to improve upon the country's governance architecture. He held an annual media forum every year at the presidency to interact with journalists about socio-political issues.

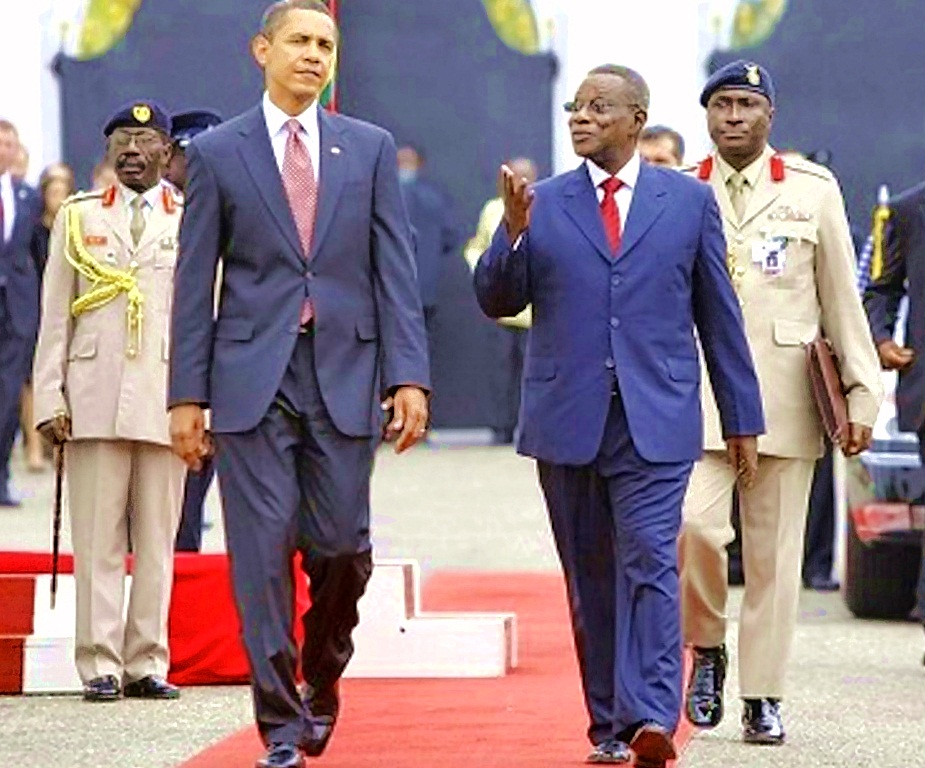
Obama & Atta Mills, 2009

President Atta Mills re-equipped and re-tooled the security agencies: the military, the police, the fire service, the Immigration, The Prisons Service and the Customs Excise and Preventive Service (CEPS). In order to ensure inter-generational equity because of the "finite nature of resource revenue" as well as financial security for future Ghanaian generations, the Mills government established in 2011, the Ghana Heritage Fund - a sovereign wealth fund generated from petroleum revenue accumulated from the country's oil and gas industry. John Atta Mills established the Media Development Fund to promote media excellence and freedom in the spirit of 1992 constitution. A few months prior to his death, he was praised by US President Barack Obama for making Ghana a "good news story" that had good democratic credentials. He also fostered economic ties with China in a bid strengthen Sino-Ghanaian bilateral relations. In 2009, the Journal of International Affairs at Columbia University featured Mills as one of the "Five Faces of African Innovation and Entrepreneurship" along with South African innovator, Euvin Naidoo and Mo Ibrahim, (founder of Celtel International and Chairman of the Mo Ibrahim Foundation) where he was lauded for his commitment to strengthening Ghana's Electoral Commission, National Media Commission and National Commission for Civic Education and more importantly, transparency in public institutions, particularly in the country's growing oil and gas sector. Mills' leadership style was very diplomatic, inclusive and less polarising than his predecessors. The BBC described his presidency as that of "a peacemaker who was never one to make disparaging comments in public" despite intense criticisms and vilification from his political supporters and opponents alike.

==== Agriculture, energy access and rural development ====
The Savannah Accelerated Development Authority (SADA) law was passed and work was started to open up the three Northern regions, Brong Ahafo and Volta Regions to enhance agriculture production and industrialisation. Under Mills, the producer price of cocoa increased appreciably to $1600 per tonne of 16 bags, which was the highest in the sub-region and the highest that had ever been paid to cocoa farmers in Ghana's entire history. Cocoa production also hit a record-breaking 1 million metric tonnes. Under the rural electrification programme, he extended national electricity coverage from 54% to 72% improving livelihoods in 1,700 communities and making Ghana the third best country in sub-Saharan Africa after Mauritius and South Africa with enhanced energy access.

== Personal life ==
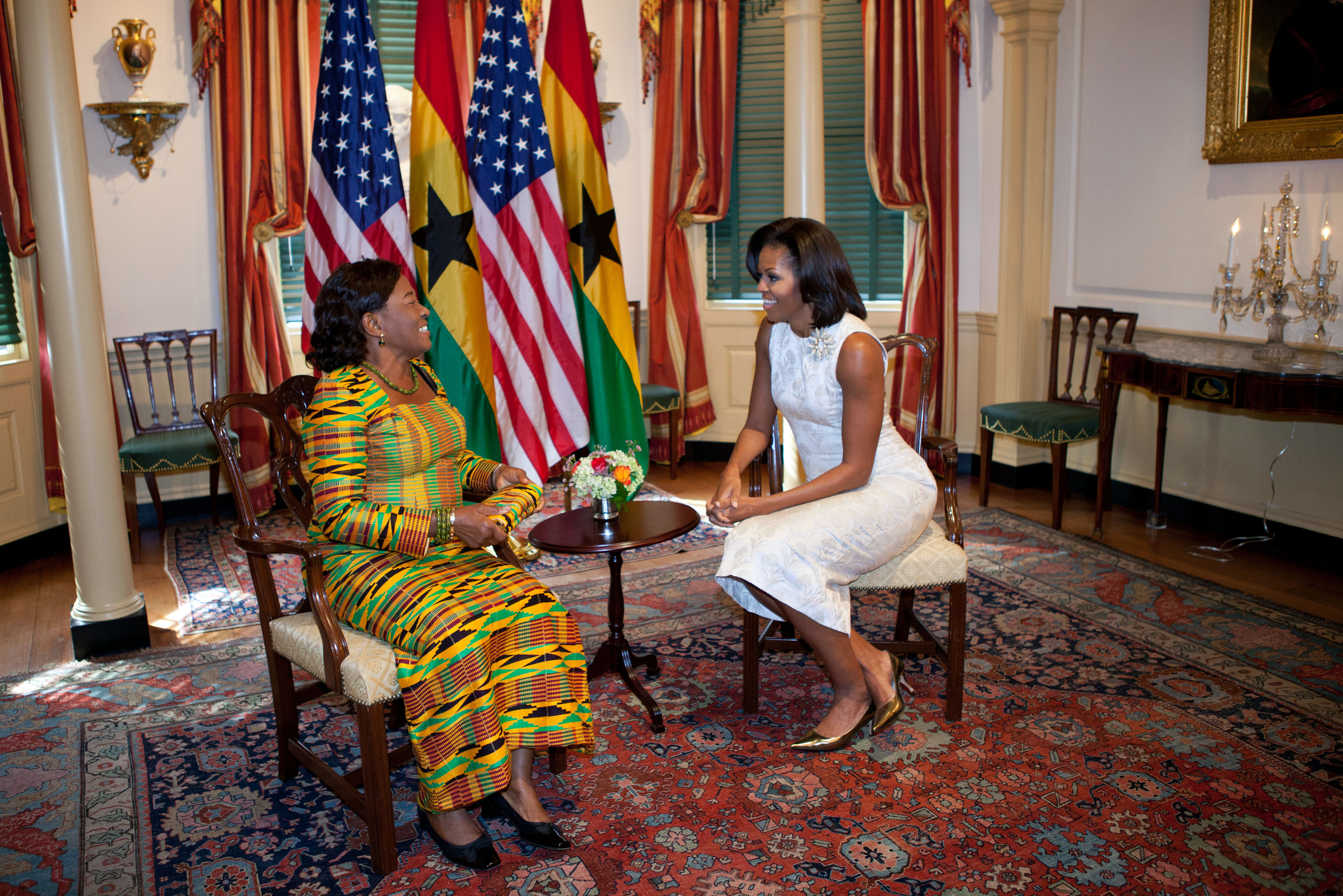
First Lady Ernestina Mills, wife of John Atta Mills, with Michelle Obama in 2012

He was married to Ernestina Naadu Mills (née Botchway), an educator, and had a son, Sam Kofi Atta Mills.

He was raised a Protestant in the Methodist tradition. He was a distant cousin of the prominent Gold Coast lawyer, Thomas Hutton-Mills, Jr. He was a good friend to T. B. Joshua of The Synagogue, Church of All Nations in Lagos, Nigeria and regularly visited his church. He said, following his inauguration, that Joshua had prophesied that it would take him three elections to win the presidency and that the result would be released in January.

As a sports administrator, he contributed to the Ghana Hockey Association, National Sports Council of Ghana, Ghana Olympic Committee and Accra Hearts of Oak Sporting Club. He enjoyed field hockey and swimming, and once played for the national hockey team (he remained a member of the Veterans Hockey Team until his death). He was also a board member of Hearts of Oak and a Manchester United fan.

== Other activities and projects ==
At the University of Ghana, Mills was the Hall Tutor of Legon Hall as well as serving as the Hall Librarian, Member of Legon Hall Council, Member of Board of Social Studies and School of Administration, Member of Admissions Board, Staff Housing Loans Scheme and the Chairman of the University Superannuation Scheme. Mills was involved in various activities and projects:

- He was a member of the Ghana Stock Exchange council.
- In 1988, he became the acting commissioner of the Internal Revenue Service of Ghana and was named national tax commissioner in September 1993.
- He also held examiner positions with finance-related institutions in Ghana, including the Institute of Chartered Accountants, Institute of Bankers, and Ghana Tax Review Commission.
- He served on the Board of Trustees of the Mines Trust.
- He was a member of the Management Committee of the Commonwealth Administration of Tax Experts, United Nations Ad Hoc Group of Experts in International Cooperation in Tax Matters and United Nations Law and Population Project.
- He led a study on equipment leasing in Ghana.
- He chaired the casebook preparation on Ghana's income tax.
- He oversaw the Review of Ghana's Double Tax Agreement with the UK.

== Illness and death ==
Mills died on 24 July 2012 at the 37 Military Hospital in Accra, three days after his 68th birthday. Though the cause of death was not immediately released, he had been suffering from throat cancer and had recently been to the US for medical reasons. Announcing his death, his office noted that he died hours after being taken ill, but a presidential aide said that he had complained of pains the day prior to his death. However, Mills' brother, Dr. Cadman Mills later disclosed during the graveside service that he had died from complications of a massive hemorrhagic stroke resulting from brain aneurysm. According to the BBC, his voice had degenerated in the previous few months. Former minister Elizabeth Ohene said that as a result of previous false reports of his death, she had not believed initial claims of his actual death. "For the past three or four years, there's been news he's been unwell and rumours of his death – twice – and he appeared with grim humour to say they were exaggerated, insisting he was well." His vice president John Mahama was sworn in at about 20:00 GMT on the same day. In accordance with Ghana's constitution, Mahama's tenure expired at the same time Mills' was due to end, by the end of the year just prior to an election, in which he was due to run. Mahama said upon being inaugurated in parliament:

This is the saddest day in our nation's history. Tears have engulfed our nation and we are deeply saddened and distraught. I never imagined that one day that it would place our nation in such a difficult circumstance. I'm personally devastated, I've lost a father, I've lost a friend, I've lost a mentor and a senior comrade. Ghana is united in grief at this time for our departed president.

=== State funeral ===
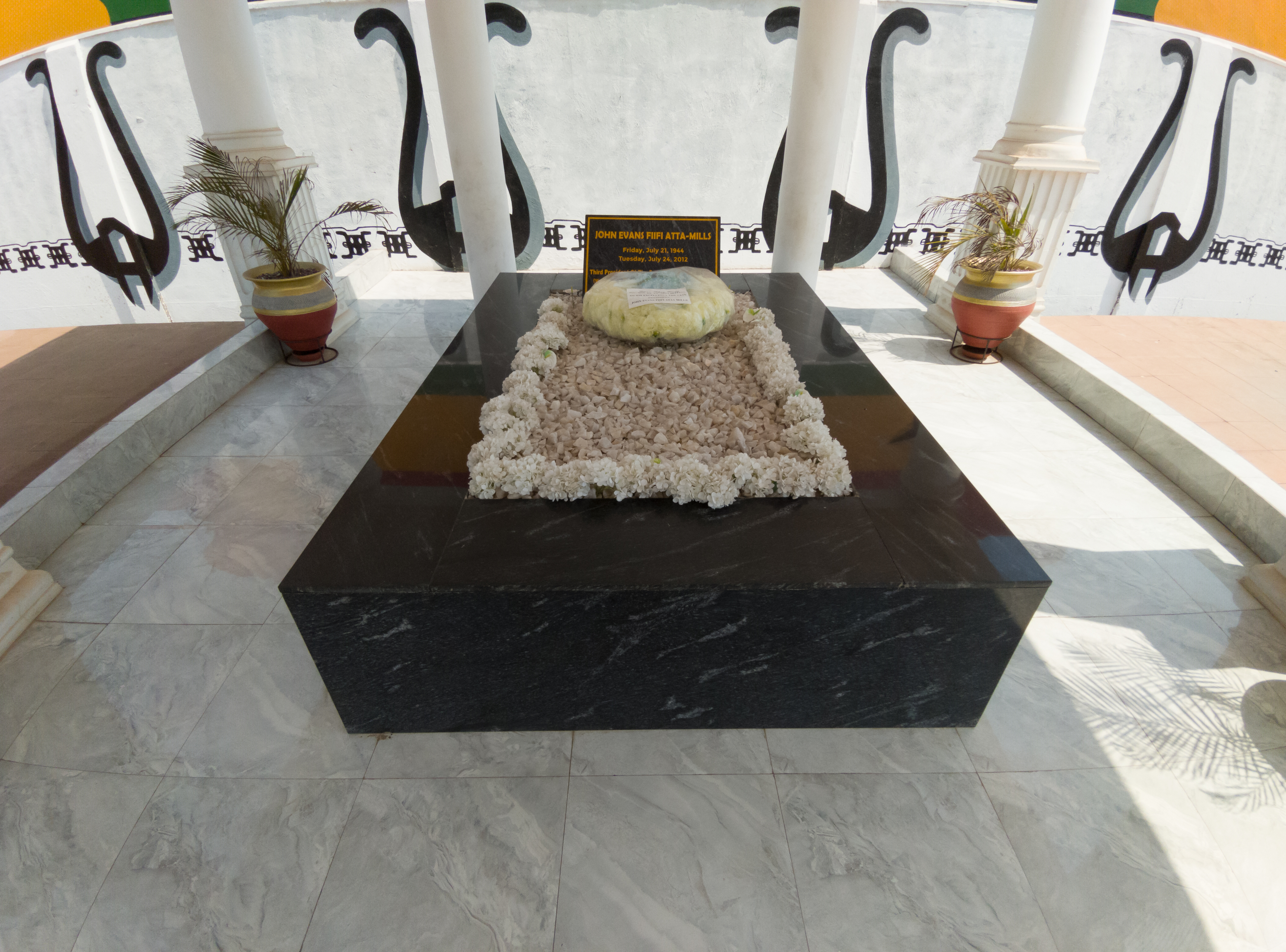
Atta Mills' gravestone at the Asomdwee Park, Accra in 2023

From 8–10 August, his body lay in state, and Ghanaian government officials, civil society, traditional leaders, the clergy, the general public and dignitaries such as Côte d'Ivoire's Alassane Ouattara, Liberia's Ellen Johnson Sirleaf, Nigeria's Goodluck Jonathan and Senegal's Macky Sall paid their last respects. Within this period, a two-night vigil was also held at the forecourt of the State House for cultural and musical performances such as traditional dirges, plays and tribute reading. Thousands streamed into the State House to pay their last respects to Mills as he lay in state with some mourners queuing for hours, many of them wailing with grief, in lines up to 10 km (6 miles) long per press reports. The body was then taken by a military cortege from the State House parliamentary complex to the Independence Square for the funerary services which was attended by 18 African Heads of State, 5 vice-presidents, United States Secretary of State, Hillary Clinton, former United Nations Secretary-General, Kofi Annan, president of the Pontifical Council for Justice and Peace, Cardinal Peter Turkson, Secretary-General of African, Caribbean and Pacific Group of States, Mohamed Ibn Chambas and several other international envoys. In all, there were 67 foreign delegations represented at the funeral. In addition to the over 50,000 people who gathered for the ceremony, his funeral was also attended by Benin's Thomas Boni Yayi, who said of Mills that he was "passionate about peace in Africa and in the region," as well as Togo's Faure Gnassingbe, who said "[Mills] was like a brother to me. I will surely miss him."

Ahead of religious ceremonies on Friday morning, the officially declared national day of mourning, a helicopter hovered over the area dropping leaflets reading: We want peaceful elections in 2012. The funeral ended with the release of a hundred white doves into the air to signify the peaceful nature of the departed leader.

After the funeral service, the president's body was taken on a military procession through some principal streets of the Ghanaian capital, Accra and then for burial in a newly created presidential mausoleum located in the northern part (Asomdwee Park) of a bird sanctuary, Geese Park renamed along the Marine Drive and next to the old seat of government, the 17th-century Fort Christiansborg, (also known as Osu Castle), which overlooks the Atlantic Ocean's Gulf of Guinea. As the sitting Commander-in-Chief, Mills was accorded full military honours, steeped in distinct and elaborate traditions, including a slow march by the Ghana Army, a flypast of Ghana Air Force jets ejecting plumes of smoke in the national colours of red, gold and green, with the Ghana Navy ships also performing ceremonial manoeuvres on the shoreline behind the Independence Square and a 21-gun salute accompanying the playing of the bugle call, Sunset and the Christian hymn, Abide with Me (Eventide) synchronized with the sounding of the Last Post by military buglers after the casket had been lowered into the grave. Approximately 700 domestic and foreign media outlets received accreditation from the Ghanaian Ministry of Information to cover the event. An estimated 20–25 million television and online or web audience watched the three-day funeral ceremonies. The state funeral for the late president was most likely the largest gathering of people in one place at a single public event in recent or modern Ghanaian history.

=== International reactions ===
Following his death, a press statement from the United Nations Secretary-General, Ban Ki-moon said Mills "will be remembered for his statesmanship and years of dedicated service to his country." and French President Francois Hollande described Mills as " the guardian of institutions and the defender of Ghanaian democracy...committed to protecting national unity and profoundly attached to African unity and to the place of Africa within the international community." A White House statement from United States President Barack Obama called Mills a "strong advocate for human rights and for the fair treatment of all Ghanaians, tirelessly working to improve the lives of the Ghanaian people; He helped promote economic growth in Ghana in the midst of challenging global circumstances and strengthened Ghana's strong tradition of democracy" while Prime Minister of the United Kingdom, David Cameron praised Mills as "a tireless defender of democracy in West Africa and across the continent" Furthermore, the Prime Minister of Japan, Yoshihiko Noda lauded Mills for "his exemplary leadership which endeared him to the hearts of many and his contribution to strengthening the relationship between Ghana and Japan." FIFA President, Sepp Blatter offered his sympathies to Ghanaians on behalf of the worldwide football fraternity saying, "Ghana has lost a great football supporter and a supporter of the development of the game in the country." In a message of condolence from the Vatican City, Pope Benedict XVI "recalled Mills' years of public service and his dedication to democratic principles and entrusted the late president's soul to the providence of Almighty God"

The Secretary General of the Commonwealth of Nations, Kamalesh Sharma eulogised Atta Mills by describing him as "an inspiring leader, a strong advocate and champion of the Commonwealth, and our membership benefited enormously from his active participation in Commonwealth life and his wisdom." The West African regional body, ECOWAS said President Mills' death "has robbed the region of a voice of wisdom which enriched the discussions of the affairs of the Community." The African Union through its chairman, Yayi Boni said "the late President Mills had the same vision as the first President of Ghana, Kwame Nkrumah and it was a great, great loss for the country and for the continent." Liberia's president and 2011 Nobel Peace Prize laureate Ellen Johnson-Sirleaf extended her condolences to Ghanaians, saying the news had "come as a surprise. On a personal level his moderation and integrity stood out, playing a strong role at the regional meetings they both attended". Nigeria's President Goodluck Jonathan said of Mills: "he was a great friend of our country and a firm believer in the shared heritage and common destiny of all Africans. President Mills and I shared a vision of peace and political stability as well as regional and continental economic integration in pursuit of progress and development, in our individual countries, within the sub-region and in Africa as a whole". South African President Jacob Zuma paid tribute to President Atta Mills, saying: "South Africa and Ghana enjoy strong relations at both the bilateral and multilateral levels, and under President Mills' leadership, we saw genuine efforts aimed at deepening the historical relations between our two nations."

== Selected writings ==
Mills' more than one dozen publications included:

- Taxation of Periodical or Deferred Payments arising from the Sale of Fixed Capital (1974)
- Exemption of Dividends from Income Taxation: A Critical Appraisal (1977)
- Report of the Tax Review Commission, Ghana, parts 1 – 3 (1977)
- Ghana’s Income Tax Laws and the Investor (1978)
- Ghana's New Investment Code: An Appraisal (1986)
- Criminal Law Treatment of Sexual Activity
- The role of the state in the evolution of the family in Anglophone countries of Africa: An overview
- A survey of taxes on the individual in Ghana
- Ghana's wealth tax: Some issues and problems
- Africa in the World (2002)
- NEPAD and New International Relations (2002)
- The Decline of a Regional Fishing Nation: The Case of Ghana and West Africa (2004)

== Memorials and legacy of John Evans Ataa Mills ==
As Head of State, Mills received the 2009 Glo-CAF Platinum Award for "commitment and contribution to sports and football development in the country." Mills was posthumously awarded the highest prize as the 2012 Lifetime Africa Achievement Prize Laureate on Democratic Governance and Development in Africa. According to the Prize Committee, the award was in "recognition of his genteel disposition, virtues, devotion and commitment to the enhancement of good Democratic Governance and Development in Ghana and Africa at large. This exaltation of character, which is worthy of emulation, has made positive impact on the lives of his people today and will continue to influence them for a better future. His courageous acts in defence and protection of fairness to all is recognized and respected on the global platform and lend to all Africans the hope that through the values of equity and democracy, we can live in peace and harmony with each other to engender communal development and life's fulfilment. This individual's leadership has had a direct impact on Ghana's success and growth which is cherished by Ghanaians countrywide."

At the 2013 African Achievers Awards, he was also awarded the Posthumous Award for Excellence in Africa in recognition of his achievements and leadership.

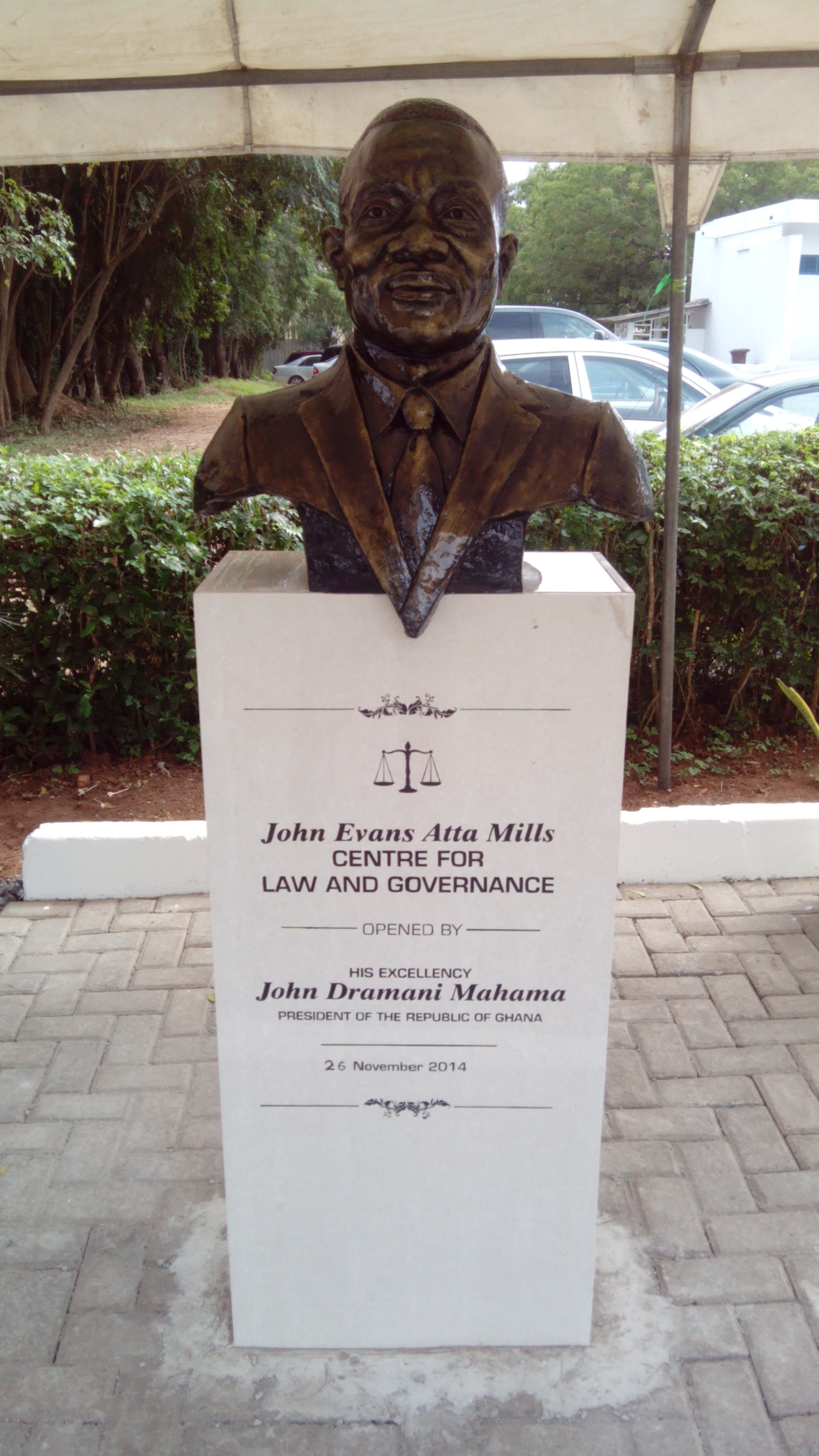
Bust of Atta Mills at the John Evans Atta Mills Centre for Law and Governance, GIMPA, Accra

The Institute of International Education (IIE) in New York City also posthumously bestowed on him its highest award, The Fritz Redlich Alumni Award in recognition of "his distinguished career and exemplary leadership that increased cooperation and understanding between Ghana and the world, and his resolute support for advancing education to prepare an entire generation in Ghana for today's competitive, globalized economy and to honour him as the first ever Fulbright Scholar to become the Head of State of an African nation by becoming the President of Ghana." In appreciation of Mills' total commitment to the rule of law and good governance, the Ghana Institute of Management and Public Administration, established The John Evans Atta Mills Centre for Law and Governance to undertake high quality research and theorisation in law, global governance and public policy.

In the wake of his death, Accra High Street was renamed John Evans Atta Mills High Street by an Accra Metropolitan Assembly resolution and in Cape Coast a street linking Cape Coast Castle to Mfantsipim Junction was renamed President John Atta Mills Street by the paramount chief of Cape Coast, Omanhene of the Oguaa Traditional Area, Osaberema Kwesi Arthur. Furthermore, for his role in consolidating local development, the Suhum Municipal Assembly and the Ga South Assembly named bypass roads after him. Also, the Municipal Assembly of Obuasi honoured Mills by naming a principal street after him in the southern mining town of Obuasi, located in the geographic middle belt of Ghana. whilst the Nandom Assembly honoured Mills by naming a street after him for creating the District in 2012.

The New Millennium City School at the Salvation Army Cluster of Schools was renamed President John Evans Atta Mills Educational Centre of Excellence. An ICT Centre was also built at Mills' alma mater Huni Valley Methodist Basic School to honour his memory while the University of Ghana, Legon, co-named its Faculty of Law building after him (and former Dean, Professor Akua Kuenyehia) in recognition of his contributions to the department as a professor and president. In 2015, the Ghanaian government named a newly commissioned community day secondary school after Atta Mills in his hometown, Otuam The Judicial Council of Ghana renamed its largest court complex after Atta Mills in acknowledgement of his contributions as "a true democrat who respected the independence of the Judiciary and worked to promote it." Additionally, a research centre known as the Kwame Nkrumah-Atta Mills Legacy Institute (KNAMLI) has been set up to study the political ideals of tolerance that President Mills cherished through his non-pursual of partisan retribution as well as his demonstration of a passive response to vitriolic attacks, vindictiveness, violence and insults as preached by global icons like Mahatma Gandhi, Martin Luther King Jr., Kwame Nkrumah and Nelson Mandela. This will act as a living testimony worthy of preservation, emulation and impartation to the youth. The institute is also a think-tank for strategic studies and organisation, in line with Nkrumah's declaration that organisation decides everything. To mark the 2013 World Post Day, the Ghana Post in collaboration with the Ministry of Communications issued commemorative postal stamps of Atta Mills in appreciation of his "dedication to social justice and political stability." In honour of his "contribution to the promotion and development of sports in general and hockey in particular", the National Hockey Association launched a yearly multinational hockey gala, the John Evans Atta Mills Annual Hockey Tournament. Other permanent memorials to institutionalise his legacy include the annual Atta Mills Memorial Lectures, the Atta Mills Foundation (a humanitarian non-profit organisation) and the Atta Mills Memorial Research Library affiliated to the University of Cape Coast In 2014, the Ghanaian government named the country's second floating production storage and offloading vessel, FPSO John Atta Mills - as president, he superintended over the first production of Ghana's new-found oil in commercial quantities. A new girls' boarding house at his alma mater, Achimota School has been named in his honour. In 2015, a newly constructed community day senior high school at Ekumfi Otuam in the Central Region, was named in honour of Mills in recognition of "his passion in promoting education". In July 2019 a seventh anniversary memorial and wreath laying ceremony took place at the Asomdwee Park. In February 2022, the John Evans Atta Mills Memorial Heritage was launched by the National Democratic Congress.

=== John Evans Atta Mills Memorial Lectures ===
These lectures were instituted in his memory. At the sixth annual lecture held at University of Health and Allied Sciences at Ho in April 2022, Joseph Siaw Agyapong disclosed that Mills resisted pressures from within his own party to cripple his business as he was affiliated to the NPP government of John Kufuor as his colleagues wanted retaliation for alleged victimisation during his rule. He instead supported and facilitated the expansion of his business. He was called "Asomdwehene" because of acts such as this.

== See also ==
- List of Mills government ministers

Political offices
Preceded by Kow Nkensen Arkaah	Vice-President of Ghana; 1997–2001	Succeeded by Aliu Mahama
Preceded by John Kufuor	President of Ghana; 2009–2012	Succeeded by John Dramani Mahama
Party political offices
Preceded by Jerry Rawlings	National Democratic Congress nominee for President of Ghana; 2000, 2004, 2008	Succeeded by John Dramani Mahama
New title	National Democratic Congress nominee for Vice President of Ghana; 1996	Succeeded by Martin Amidu
