= China–Ghana relations =

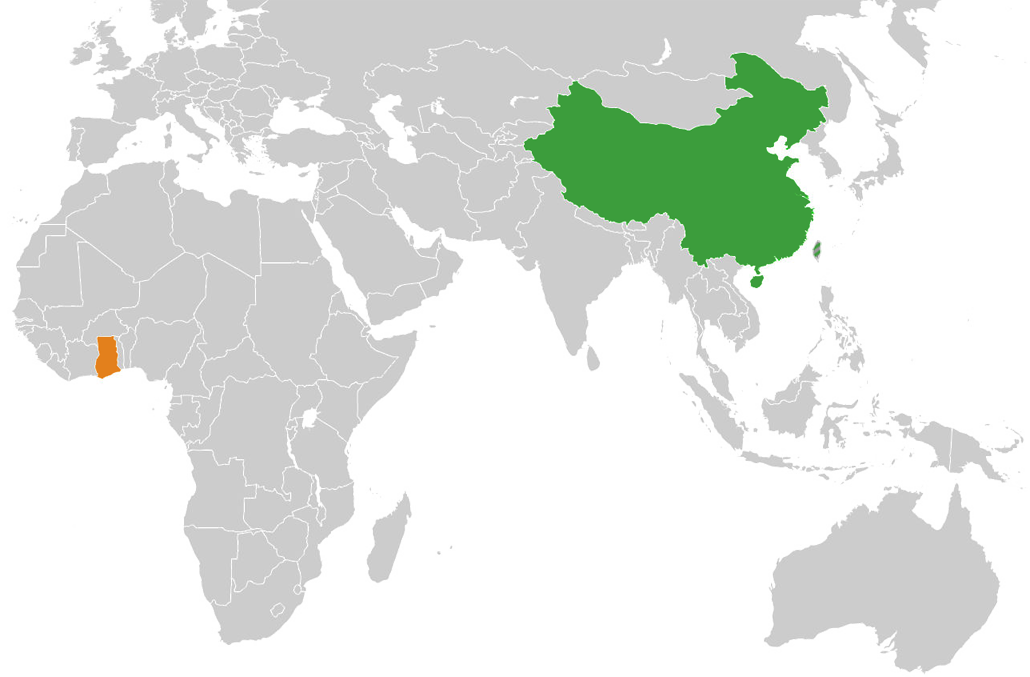
- China: Ghana

China–Ghana relations refer to the current and historical relationship between the Republic of Ghana and the People's Republic of China (PRC).

== History ==
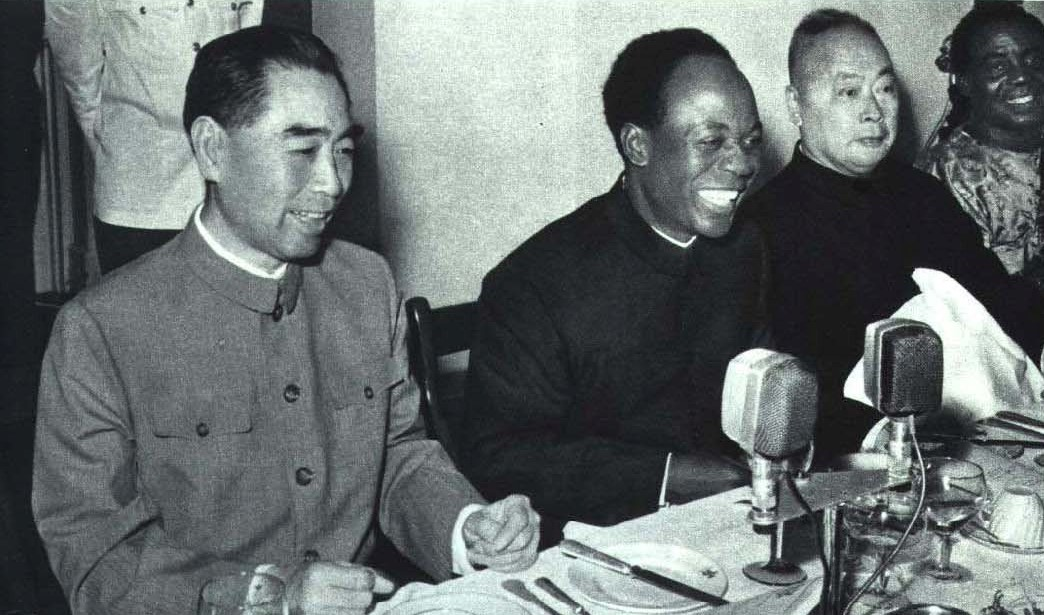
Zhou Enlai with President Nkrumah on his visit to Ghana in April 1964

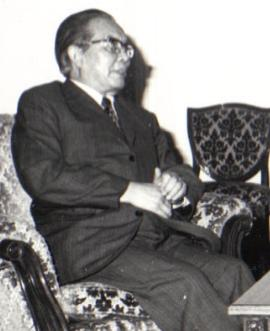
Huang Hua in 1961 became PRC's first ambassador to Ghana

China and Ghana established diplomatic relations on July 5, 1960. Since then Ghana has provided substantial diplomatic support to the PRC with the PRC reciprocating with material support for Ghana's development.

In the 1960s President Nkrumah lobbied for the PRC's reinstatement in the United Nations. Nkrumah also supported the PRC during the Sino-Indian War in 1962. Nkrumah's dressing changed to the Chinese-supplied Mao suit.

After the 1966 coup, Nkrumah stayed in Beijing for four days and Premier Zhou Enlai treated Nkrumah with courtesy. The post-coup Ghana government closed the Chinese embassy in 1966, because in its view China continued to support Nkrumah, who had taken refuge in Guinea. Chinese government personnel left Ghana in November 1966.

Ghana and China restored diplomatic relations in January 1972.

In the early 1990s, China built Ghana's National Theatre as a reward for Ghana's diplomatic support following the 1989 Tiananmen Square protests and massacre. After Kufuor was elected president of Ghana in 2001 the PRC gave Ghana a US$2.4 million grant to renovate the theatre.

== Official visits ==
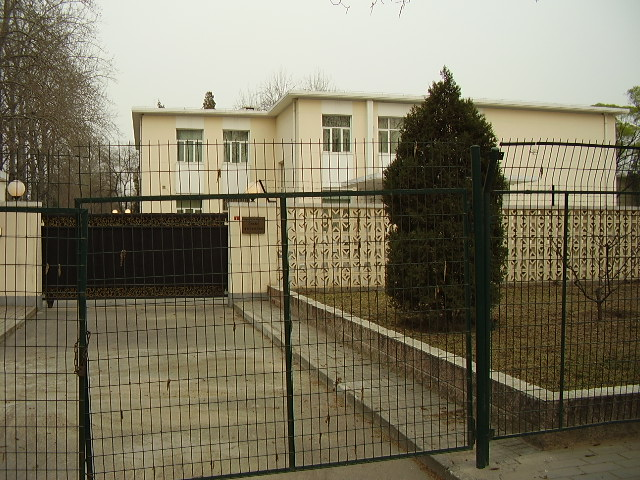
Ghanaian Embassy in Beijing, PR China

The two countries have enjoyed a strong relationship since 1960, with high-level official visits to China by then President Nkrumah and reciprocal visits to Ghana by Chinese Premier Zhou Enlai. In 2002 Ghana's President John Kufuor made a high-level visit to China, and in 2003 General Secretary of the Chinese Communist Party Hu Jintao visited Ghana. Chinese Premier Wen Jiabao visited Ghana on the second leg of his seven-nation tour of Africa in 2007.

In September 2010 Ghanaian President John Evans Atta Mills visited China on an official visit. China reciprocated with a visit in November 2011 by the Vice Chairman of the Standing Committee of the National People's Congress of China Zhou Tienong who visited Ghana and met with Ghana's then Vice President John Dramani Mahama.

== Economy ==
China has emerged as a major economic partner for Ghana since the 2000s, with bilateral trade and investment flows increasing dramatically over the past two decades. The relationship encompasses foreign direct investment, development assistance, trade partnerships, and significant Chinese entrepreneurial migration to Ghana.

Ghana joined the Belt and Road Initiative (BRI) in 2018.

=== Trade and investment ===
Chinese investment in Ghana has grown exponentially from $4.4 million in registered projects in 2000 to $1.6 billion in 2014 alone. Total Chinese foreign direct investment reached $2.2 billion cumulatively between 2008 and 2015, compared to just $199 million for the entire 2000-2007 period.

By 2015, the building and construction sectors had become the largest recipients of Chinese investment, followed by manufacturing and general trade. The manufacturing sector, which had previously dominated Chinese investments, experienced fluctuations but regained prominence in 2014. The services sector emerged as a significant recipient from 2006 onwards, while the liaison sector began attracting Chinese investments from 2009 after receiving none from 2000 to 2008.

China is currently Ghana's second-largest trading partner. Bilateral trade volumes increased from $93.13 million in 2000 to $433.74 million by 2005, reflecting the rapid expansion of economic ties between the two countries.

The strategic importance of Ghana to China's West African operations was demonstrated in November 2011 when China opened the fourth office of the China-Africa Development Fund in Accra, with a regional focus on West Africa.

=== Development assistance and infrastructure projects ===
China has provided substantial development assistance to Ghana through concessionary loans, grants, and technical cooperation spanning several decades.

==== Major infrastructure projects ====
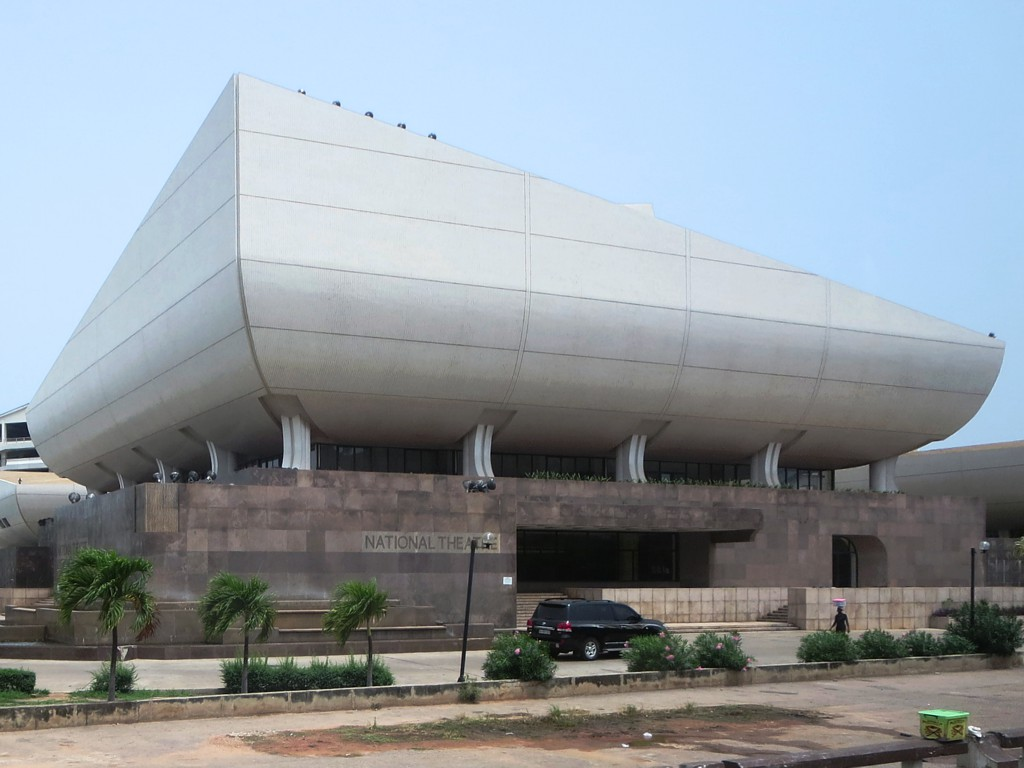
Ghanaian National Theater built by Chinese assistance.

Premier Wen Jiabao's 2007 visit resulted in six bilateral agreements and a $66 million Chinese loan to upgrade Ghana's telecommunications infrastructure. This included a $30 million concessionary loan for the first phase of a fiber optic network connecting all ten regional capitals and 36 towns. China has also provided a $6 billion concessionary loan from the China Export Import Bank for railway network expansion.

The China Export and Import Bank provided a $562 million loan for the construction of the $622 million Bui hydroelectric dam, representing a major investment in Ghana's energy sector.

China funded the construction of the 17-kilometer Ofankor-Nsawam road with a $28 million interest-free loan, completed in 2009. Additionally, a $99 million interest-free loan supported the construction of fishing community landing sites and the Afife rice project.

==== Cultural and educational projects ====
China's early development assistance included cultural infrastructure, notably the Ghanaian National Theater built with Chinese aid. In 1985, China provided an interest-free loan for the theater's construction, which was completed and handed over to Ghana in 1992. China also agreed in 1987 to build and finance the Kathmandu International Conference Center.

China has provided substantial technical cooperation, with over 700 Ghanaians participating in Chinese-funded training programs covering education, trade, communications, energy, auditing, agriculture, and fisheries. Historical development assistance totaled $43.5 million between 1964 and 1970, with China writing off $25 million in debt.

=== Chinese migration ===
Beyond state-to-state economic flows, Ghana has experienced significant Chinese entrepreneurial migration since the 2000s. These independent Chinese traders, often operating separately from state-owned enterprises, have established businesses across various sectors including manufacturing, trading, tourism, services, and construction. By 2008, Chinese nationals and state-owned enterprises had investments in 283 projects: 97 in manufacturing, 59 in trading, 48 in tourism, 44 in services, and 15 in construction.

While Chinese traders have provided Ghanaian consumers with affordable goods, their presence has generated tensions with local merchants. The Ghana Union of Traders Association and individual Ghanaian traders have raised concerns about Chinese trading practices and their concentration in traditional market spaces, leading to displacement of both local traders and goods from neighboring African countries. Ghanaian traders frequently contrast Chinese merchants unfavorably with established Indian and Lebanese trading communities in Ghana.

The intersection of politics and Chinese-funded development was evident when President John Evans Atta-Mills made the refurbishment of Kotokoraba Market in Cape Coast a central campaign promise in 2008, later seeking Chinese financing for the project during his presidency.

==== Illegal gold mining ====
Involvement of Chinese nationals in illegal gold mining has led to widespread public outcry about environmental destruction and arrests of Chinese nationals by the authorities. In September 2025, authorities in Ghana tightened visa rules for Chinese nationals in an attempt to curb illegal mining.

== Media ==
StarTimes, CGTN Africa, and Xinhua News Agency have a significant presence in Ghana's media landscape and present a pro-Chinese government viewpoint to Ghanaian audiences.

== Political relations ==
Ghana follows the one China principle. It recognizes the People's Republic of China as the sole government of China and Taiwan as an integral part of China's territory, and supports all efforts by the PRC to "achieve national reunification". It also considers Hong Kong, Xinjiang and Tibet to be China's internal affairs.

In April 2007 the CPPCC's Chairman, Jia Qinglin, granted a US$30 million concessional loan for the Dedicated Communications Project to foster closer military and security ties between the two countries. This included a grant of a US$7.5 million for the construction of an office complex for Ghana's Ministry of Defence.

== Ghanaian Chinese ==
Ghanaian Chinese are an ethnic group of Chinese diaspora in Ghana. The ancestors of ethnic Chinese migrants to Ghana were of Hong Kong origin. They began arriving in the late 1940s and early 1950s. In the late 1960s and early 1970s, some of the Hong Kong migrants began to bring their wives and children over to Ghana. Migrants from Shanghai also began to arrive round this time. With the economic reform and opening up in the PRC, migrants from mainland China began arriving. Migration from mainland China intensified in the 1990s; some came as employees, but most were independent traders running import-export businesses or restaurants. The sources of migration have also expanded; whereas earlier migrants came mostly from Hong Kong or Shanghai, later Chinese migrants have arrived from Guangdong and Henan as well as the Republic of China on Taiwan.

== Public opinion ==
A survey published in 2026 by the Pew Research Center found that 64% of Ghanaians had a favorable view of China, while 29% had an unfavorable view.
