= Fosu =

Fosu may refer to:

== People ==
- Akwasi Oppong Fosu (born 1958), Ghanaian politician
- Alfons Fosu-Mensah (born 1994), Dutch football player
- Ebenezer Kobina Fosu (born 1952), Ghanaian politician
- Ignatius Osei-Fosu (born 1986), Ghanaian football manager
- KK Fosu (born 1981), Ghanaian musician
- Tariqe Fosu, Ghanaian football player
- Timothy Fosu-Mensah (born 1998), Dutch football player
- Yaw Fosu-Amoah (born 1981), South African long jumper

== Places ==
- Assin Fosu, Ghana
- Fosu Lagoon, Ghana
