= Fort McCarthy =

British Colonial Fort, located in Ghana

- Cape Coast, Ghana
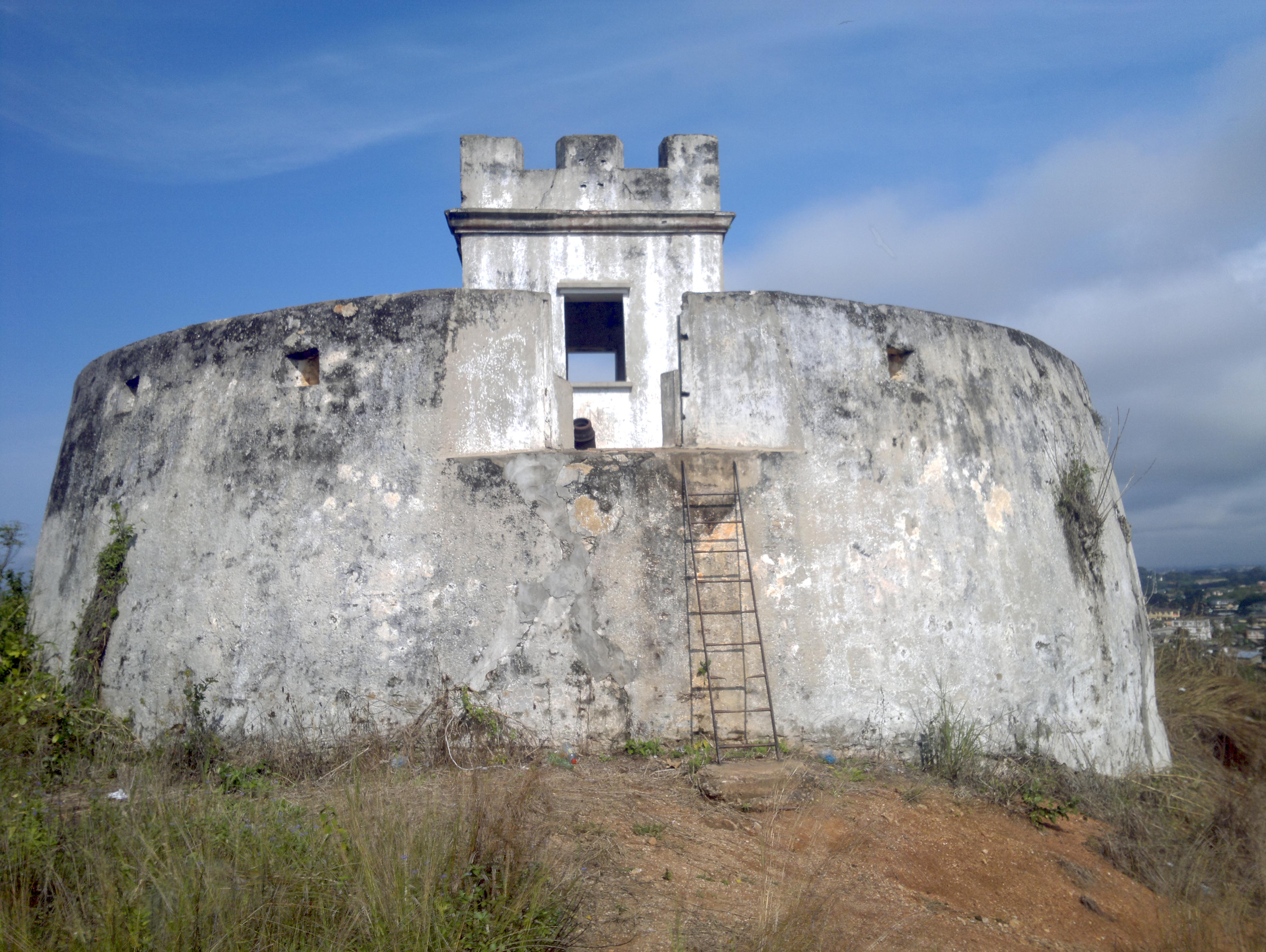

Site information
- Condition: Ruins

Location
- Coordinates: 5°06′29″N 1°14′40″W

Site history
- Built by: British Gold Coast

Fort McCarthy is a fort from the colonial British Gold Coast period in present-day Ghana.

The fort is a ruin in Cape Coast, of the Central Region of Ghana.
