= Kotokoraba Market, Cape Coast, Ghana =

Kotokoraba Market, or Kotokuraba Market, is the largest market in Cape Coast, capital of the Central Region of Ghana, which is the tourism hub of Ghana. Cape Coast is known for many reasons, including for its UN World Heritage Site – Cape Coast Castle – and its senior high schools, and is also popular because of its market. Kotokoraba Market is the economic hub of the region, with all major trading stores located around it. Part of the market has a big transport yard from where various buses and cars transport traders and their wares, as well as individuals, to different parts of the country.

The market is bordered to the north-west by Mfantsipim School and the Ghana Broadcasting Corporation hill. On the east is Tantri, a busy transport yard and the major departure point for travellers moving out of the city.

== History ==
The market has existed for years, and was a major trading site during the pre-independence era, continuing to grow to is present size. It served as a major point for all trade in the region. Its position made it a hotspot for economic activity, as major activities in the city went on in and around the area. This led to the area quickly filling up with building for stores. Various trading houses brought their businesses close as it brought them closer to buyers. The name of the market, which could mean "crab village", is believed to derive from early settlers who made their living from the abundance of crabs in the bay.

John Evans Atta-Mills made refurbishing the market a major feature of his presidential campaign. As President, he sought financing for the refurbishment from China.

== Fires ==
As with many big markets in Ghana, most destruction to the Kotokoraba market is attributable to fire: two major fires have razed parts of the market since 2000. In 2002 fire gutted the market, destroying goods worth thousands of cedis. About 104 stalls and goods including textiles, provisions, toiletries and foodstuffs were completely destroyed. It took a combined team of personnel of the Ghana National Fire Service drawn from Cape Coast, Mankessim, Apam and Takoradi more than two hours to bring the fire under control. The fire started at about 7 pm. On 24 April 2010, fire destroyed several shops and a number of temporary structures at the Kotokoraba Market.

In both case the central government had to put in funds to rebuild the market, and in some cases paid some money as disaster relief to traders who had lost their wares.

== Sanitation ==
As in many big markets in Ghana, waste and its management is a major preoccupation of the authorities in charge. Normally, cleaners start work at dawn when the market is the least busy, sweeping and gathering the previous day's refuse. They also clean the gutters every three months, more often in the rainy season, to prevent them from getting blocked.
