= Fetu Afahye =

Festival in Ghana by the people in Cape Coast

Fetu Afahye is a festival celebrated by the chiefs and people of Cape Coast in the Central region of Ghana. The festival is celebrated on the first Saturday in September every year. It is named after the 17th Century Aboriginal Guan Fetu or Effutu kingdom located some 19 kilometers inland of Paramount chief's yam festival and is observed in the form of offering mashed yams to the gods for a successful harvest.

== History ==
Fetu Afahye is an annual festival celebrated by the people and chiefs of the Cape Coast Traditional Area in the Central Region of Ghana. It is observed to commemorate a bumper harvest from the sea as well as performing rituals to thank the 77 gods of Oguaa Traditional Area.

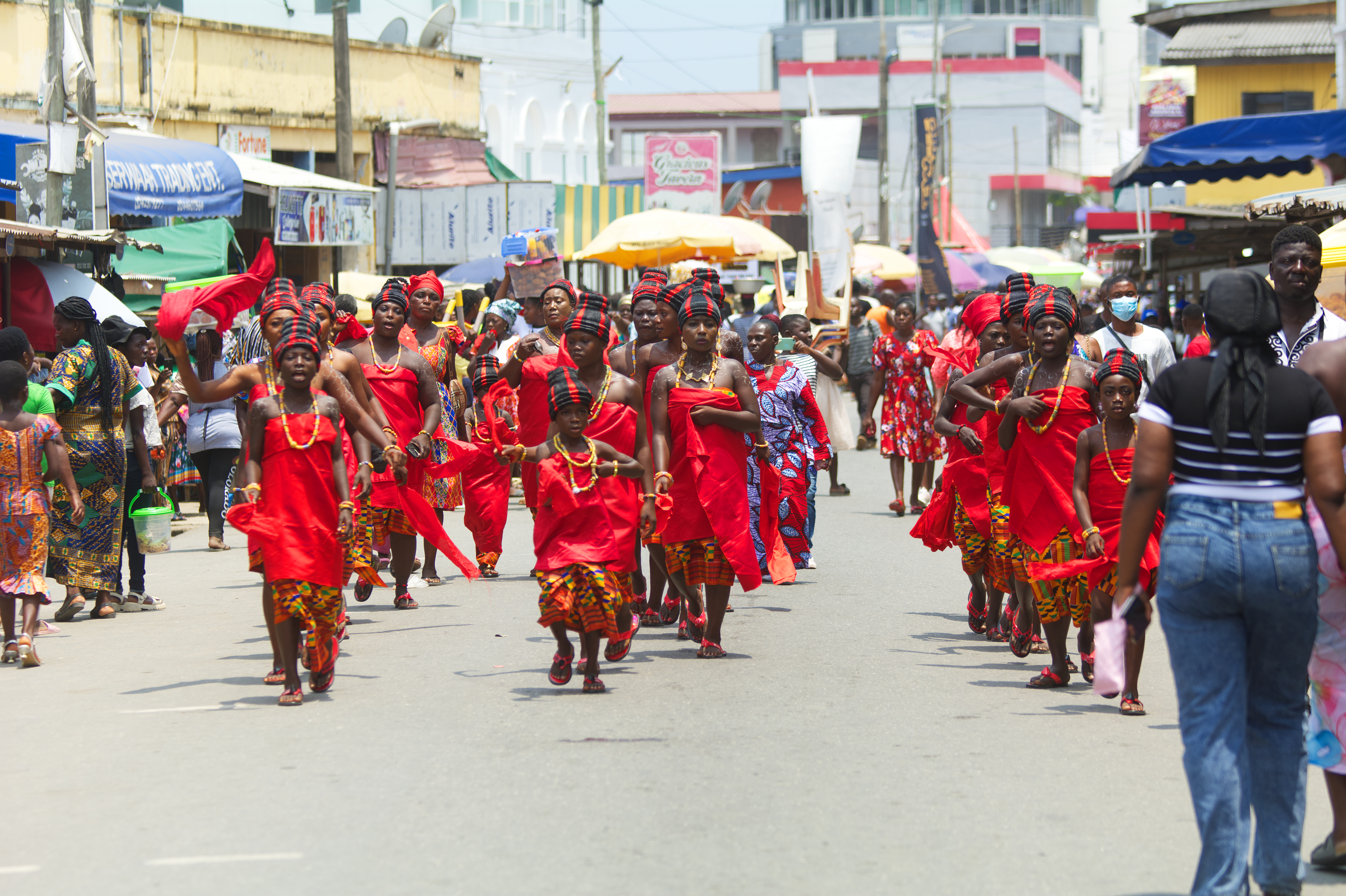
Kids processing for the festival

The country's previous colonial administration, specifically Cape Coast, once outlawed the Fetu Afahye and referred to it as "Black Christmas" to denote that it was a bad traditional phenomenon. The Omanhen (paramount chief) at that time, who is named the Osabarimba Kodwo Mbra V, Okyeame Ekow Atta, debunked this conception as misleading. Between 1948 and 1996, the festival finally resumed after the religious struggle from various important personalities in the Oguaa Traditional Area. The festival is now used as a calendar for the farming seasons of the Oguaa Traditional Area, and this particular phenomenon is also referred to as "Afehyia," meaning "a loop of seasons."

== Celebrating the Fetu Afahye ==
Preparation for the festival starts in the last week of August. During this period, Oguaa Traditional area receives many visitors from all walks of life, as well as people from different parts of the country or outside the country who are natives of Oguaa state. The actual celebration follows on the first Saturday of September.

Prior to the actual celebration of the festival, the Omanhen is confined for a week. During this period of confinement, he meditates and asks for wisdom from the creator (Aboadze) and the ancestors, as well as seeking medical attention where necessary from his physician to enable him come out both physically and mentally fit for the impending activities, such as delivering his tasks for the success of the festival. At the end of Omanhen's confinement, he appears in public in pomp and dignity and goes to the stool house to pour libation, seeking blessing from the 77 gods of Oguaa state, who the people believe steer the affairs of Oguaa traditional area.

It is also noted that before the festival, all drumming festivities and drumming sounds are banned as tradition demands, as well as fishing in the Fosu Lagoon, lying between The Government Central Hospital and stretching to a place called Aquarium, to ensure a quiet and peaceful environment. It is believed that this is done to allow the spirits of Oguaa state to take over and lead the planners of the festival. This is usually observed before 1 September.

The custodians of Fosu Lagoon (Amissafo) of Oguaa Traditional Area also pour libation at the estuary of the lagoon and invoke the spirits of their ancestors to eradicate any bad omens that may befall visitors involved in the festival. The aim of pouring libation is also to call for a plumper harvest of fish and crops. In all, they call for prosperity.

Another important event observed is the "Amuntumadeze"—literally meaning "health day" – a day when both the young and the old make efforts to clean the environment, including clearing waste from choked gutters and painting all buildings in the area, with the aim of beautifying the vicinity before the actual grand durbar of "Bakatue."

A vigil is observed at Fosu Lagoon near its shrine on every last Monday of August. A large number of people gather at the shrine to have a glimpse of the display of the priests and priestesses of the traditional area. This exhibition is normally done in the night till the next morning. During this night, drumming and dancing by both the priest and the priestesses are observed and the spirits of their ancestors are invoked to foretell what will happen in the next year. The following Tuesday also sees many activities, such as rituals carried out at the Fosu shrine, and finally daytime regatta and canoe riding on the Fosu Lagoon is observed after the Omanhen's libation at the estuary.

As a result of the earlier ban on fishing in the Fosu Lagoon, the Omanhen is the first person to throw his net, three consecutive times to officially open up the lagoon for the general public. For the Omanhen to catch plenty of fish indicates a prosperous fishing season to come. This event is foreshown by special crowd in the middle of the firing of musketry. This is called "Bakatue" and can be performed only by the chief .

However, in giving a warm welcoming atmosphere for the native who have travelled, the chiefs of Oguaa Traditional Area set aside Wednesday for receiving and welcoming citizens of Cape Coast. This day is also characterized by drumming and dancing by the Asafo companies, the seven traditional militia groups. It is also noted as a day of socialization and resolution of issues.

A religious ceremony is held in front of Nana Paprata shrine on the Thursday night, with accompanying rituals and dancing ("Adammba") to summon the spirits of the ancestors to enable the priests and priestesses to soothsay. This ceremony normally lasts till the next morning. The main aim of this ceremony is to cleanse Oguaa Traditional Area of any bad spirit. During this same period, a bull is always needed to purify the Oguaa Traditional Area. Prior to this purification, the bull is sent to Nana Tabir's shrine to cleanse the bull for sacrifice on the ultimate day. This bull is later sacrificed at Papratam (the durbar grounds for Ogua Traditional Area). It is mostly identified as the silk cotton tree where the Omanhen, on the climax day, sits in state with his divisional and sub-chiefs, flanked by the council of elders. At the meeting, the Omanhen addresses the people and visitors of Oguaa Traditional Area, recounting events of the past. After the state address, the Omanhen walks towards the entrance, flanked by his sub-chiefs and divisional chiefs to Tabir's shrine, where the cow is tied by its limbs. The Omanhen pours libation and performs various rituals, calling on the forefathers to intervene in Oguaa state. At this juncture, he takes a dagger to slaughter the cow for the gods.

Following the Omanhen's sacrifice, the Fetu festival culminates on the first Saturday of September with a procession of the Asafo companies through Cape Coast, moving from Kotokuraba through Chapel Square to the chief's palace. The event includes a durbar of chiefs to discuss issues affecting the Oguaa Traditional Area, along with participation from the seven Asafo security companies. The day features traditional drumming, dancing, and libation ceremonies.

Contemporary issues, such as the Afahye state dance, local cuisine, football games, clothing and traditional wear, among many other forms of cultural artifacts, add up to giving facial lift to the endowments of the festivals, particularly the stylish and eye-catching dance of the Miss Afahye.

After the festive days are over, the grand ceremony is on Sunday, when a joint service of all Christian denominations is held at Victoria Park to offer thanks to God for helping Oguaa Traditional Area to have a peaceful festival. In addition, the day is an occasion to appeal for funds for Oguaa Traditional Area. In view of this, the Omanhen and his divisional chiefs as well as elders attend the church occasion and take the opportunity to announce the day for the next year's celebration.

== Highlights of the Fetu Afahye ==
- The Omanhen is confined for a week prior to the actual celebration.
- Pouring of libation to the 77 gods
- All drumming festivities and drumming sounds are banned
- Banning on fishing in the Fosu Lagoon
- Observation of "Amuntumadeze", a day dedicated to the general cleaning of the towns.
- The climax of the event is held on the first Saturday in September.
- A grand ceremony is held on Sunday, when a joint service of all Christian denominations is held at Victoria Park.
