= Cape Coast Technical University =

Public university in the Central Region of Ghana

- Other names: CCTU
- Former names: Cape Coast Polytechnic
- Type: Technical University
- Established: 1984; 42 years ago
- Location: Cape Coast, Ghana; 5.1047°N 1.2831°W
- Campus: Main Campus
- Website: cctu.edu.gh

Formally Cape Coast Polytechnic is a public tertiary institution in the Central Region of Ghana.

Cape Coast Polytechnic was in existence in 1984 as a second cycle institution.

In began operating under Ghana Education Service in 1986. It was then allowed to offer intermediate courses and also award non-tertiary certificates.

After the enactment of the PNDCL 321 in 1992, the Technical University was upgraded to a tertiary level that allowed it to run programmes associated with the award of Higher National Diploma.

== Courses ==
Cape Coast Technical University as an institution have twelve (12) academic departments and three schools.

The courses run by Cape Coast Technical University are Arts, Business, applied sciences, and Engineering, Mechanical Engineering, Procurement & Supply Chain Management Building Technology, Bachelor of Science in Statistics Accounting with Computing, Civil Engineering, Secretaryship & Management Studies, Marketing and Telecommunication Engineering.

== Addition of Cyber Security Unit ==
In October 2020, a cyber security department and forensic lab was commissioned. This was part of the National Initiative for Cyber Security Engineering Science and Technology and Education Programme (NICESTEP). It is the brain child of Cyber Ghana in conjunction with the Royal Academy of Engineering, United Kingdom and the Lloyds Register Foundation, all in the UK. This was to provide skills training, jobs creation and to curb cyber crime in Ghana.

== See also ==
- List of universities in Ghana
- Education in Ghana
