= Cape Coast =

City in Central Region, Ghana

Cape Coast Oguaa Kotokuraba
- City
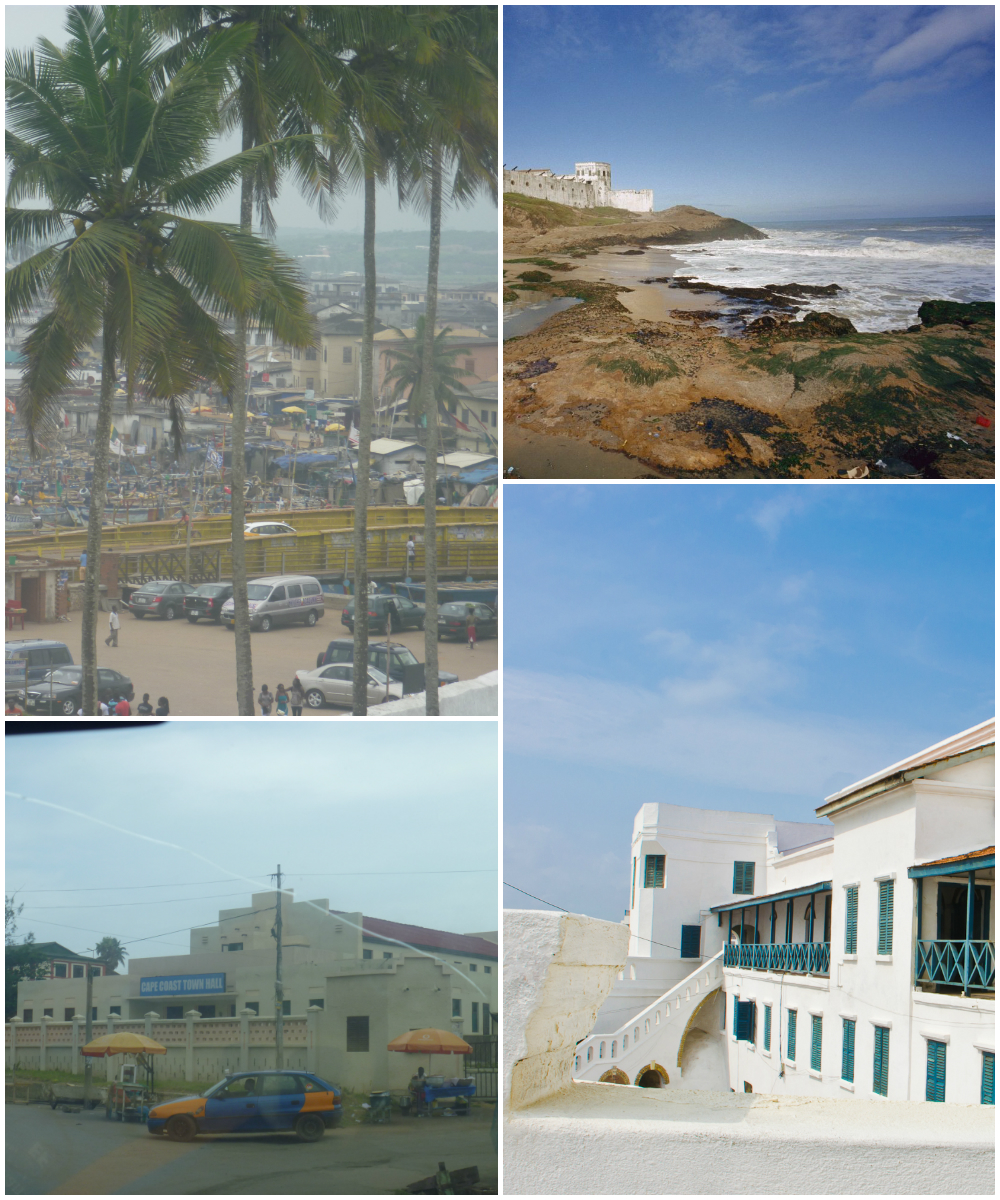
- Counter-clockwise from top-left: Arch bridge and harbour view from Elmina Castle; City hall of Cape Coast; Cape Coast Castle; Cape Coast shoreline.
- Etymology: Portuguese: Cabo Corso ("short cape")
- Location in Ghana Location in Africa
- Coordinates: 05°06′N 01°15′W
- Country: Ghana
- Region: Central Region
- District: Cape Coast Metropolitan
- Founded: 1482

Government
  - Type: Mayor–council
  - Metropolitan Mayor: Ernest Arthur
- Elevation: 0 m (0 ft)

Population (2010)
  - Total: 108,374
  - Ethnicities: Fante; Akan
  - Religion: Christianity; Islam; Traditional African religions
- Time zone: UTC+00:00 (GMT)
- Postcode district: CC
- Area code: 033
- Climate: As
- Website: ccma.gov.gh

Cape Coast is a city and the capital of the Cape Coast Metropolitan District and the Central Region of Ghana. It is located about 38.4 mi (61.8 km) from Sekondi-Takoradi and approximately 80 mi (130 km) from Accra. The city is one of the most historically significant settlements in Ghana. As of the 2010 census, Cape Coast has a population of 108,374 people. The majority of people who live in the city are Fante.

The city was once the capital of the Fetu Kingdom, an aboriginal Guan kingdom located 10 miles (16 km) north of Cape Coast. Once the Europeans arrived, they established Cape Coast Castle, which eventually fell into the hands of the British, who named the castle and its surrounding settlement the headquarters of the Royal African Company. Cape Coast became the capital of the Gold Coast from 1821 until 1877, when it was transferred to Accra.

Cape Coast is an educational hub in Ghana, home to the University of Cape Coast and Cape Coast Technical University, along with many other secondary and technical institutions. Tourism dominates the city's economy and services, with sites such as Cape Coast Castle (World Heritage Site) and Kakum National Park, and celebrations such as the PANAFEST festival serving as attractions to tourists, with Kotokuraba Market being the largest market in the city.

== Toponymy ==
The traditional name of the city is Oguaa, from the Guan Awutu word "Gua", meaning "market". Another traditional name is Koto-Kuraba, meaning "crab-hamlet", which is a corrupted version of the word Koto-wuraba, meaning "crab rivulets". The word survives in the name of a market in the city.[2]:

Cabo Corso ("short cape") was the first European name given to the settlement by the early Portuguese navigators who first discovered it. The name was later corrupted by the British to "Cape Coast".

== History ==
=== Early settlement ===
The origin of the indigenous inhabitants of the settlement is thought to share similarities to those of Edina, as Cape Coast became the principal town of the Fetu Kingdom. "Fetu" was an old Guan (Etsii) kingdom that had its paramountcy located 10 miles (16 km) north of Cape Coast. That particular site is known nowadays as Effutu. [2]:

At a point in time, a market, known at the time as Ogua, grew and developed into an active commercial centre. Because of this growth, the King of Fetu appointed a chief to represent the settlement. The market drew the attention of William Towerson, the first documented English navigator to have reached the Guinea coast, who touched land in 1555.

=== Arrival of Europeans ===
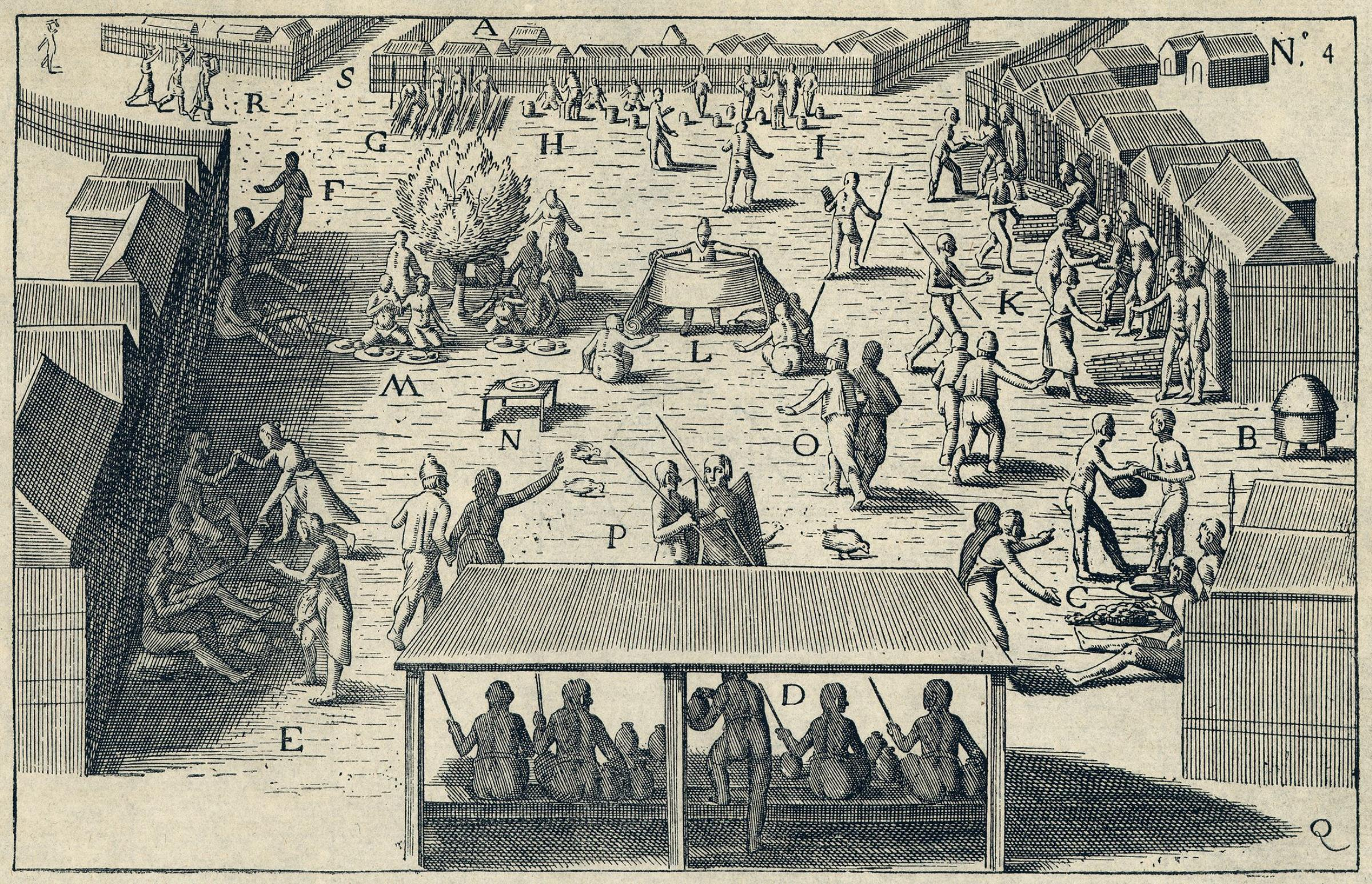
A market in Cape Coast (c. 1602)

Trade grew between the people of Fetu and the Europeans. Sometime in 1650, a plot of land was bought from the King of Fetu by Hendrik Carloff, acting for Dutch privateers working against the Dutch West India Company. In 1655, a fort was built on the site of Carolusborg under the hands of the Swedes [7]. It switched hands several times before 1664, when it was captured from the Dutch by a joint English and Dutch force.

After the attack, the English named Cape Coast the headquarters of the Royal African Company [a] (Note: The Royal African Company was an English trading company with its headquarters for West Africa operations being located in Cape Coast. The company was involved in trade such as slaves, gold, ivory, wax, and dyewood. It was replaced in 1752 by the African Company of Merchants.) in 1678. The Danes acquired a plot on top of a hill that was located about 1,000 metres (3,300 ft) northeast of the fort. While Cape Coast Castle was being built, the Danish built a fort on their land, known as Fort Frederiksborg. The fort was later bought by the English.

For half a century, the English maintained Frederiksborg as a fortified outpost of the castle and renamed it Fort Royal, but by the middle of the 18th century, the outpost had been abandoned. Other forts were built during this time, such as Phipps Tower, which was later abandoned and is now managed by the Ghana Museums and Monuments Board [2]:

=== Colonial times ===
The Napoleonic Wars at the beginning of the 19th century and the political unrest in the Gold Coast region as a result of the abolition of the Atlantic slave trade by Denmark and Britain were contributing factors in the Asante invasion of the coast in 1806. Cape Coast itself avoided the attack, but the confidence of the townspeople in the British ability to protect them against the Asante plummeted [2]:

More forts were built, such as Smith's Tower on top of Dawson Hill and Fort McCarthy [2]:

Cape Coast was threatened a second time by the Asante in 1824 after British troops under Charles MacCarthy were defeated. The town had been largely burnt down in 1817, slowing down its economy.

Before the building of the Sekondi Harbour in the 1890s, the town was the most important anchorage in the county. Trading during the time was at its peak, but after 1850, the year the British acquired Danish possessions, conditions turned sour. Trade declined, rivalry with the Dutch reached new heights, and Asante pressures escalated.

The capital of the Gold Coast was transferred from Cape Coast to Accra in 1877. This, along with many other causes, resulted in irreversible damage to the town's economy. The 1880s saw a minor boom in its economy with the gold rush.

=== Present (1900–present) ===
The city's St. Francis Cathedral was dedicated in 1928. The building is the first Catholic Cathedral built in Ghana. In addition, one of the first Catholic schools in Ghana, St. Augustine's College, was established in Cape Coast in 1936. During Ghana's cocoa marketing boom of the 1900s, the city experienced a certain period of economic prosperity.

After the completion of harbours and railways in other parts of the country, such as Sekondi and Kumasi, cocoa cultivation and trade in Ghana diversified, and Cape Coast lost some importance. However, after the establishment of the Roman Catholic Archdiocese and the university of the city in 1950 and 1962 respectively, Cape Coast became an educational hub in Ghana.

== Transportation ==
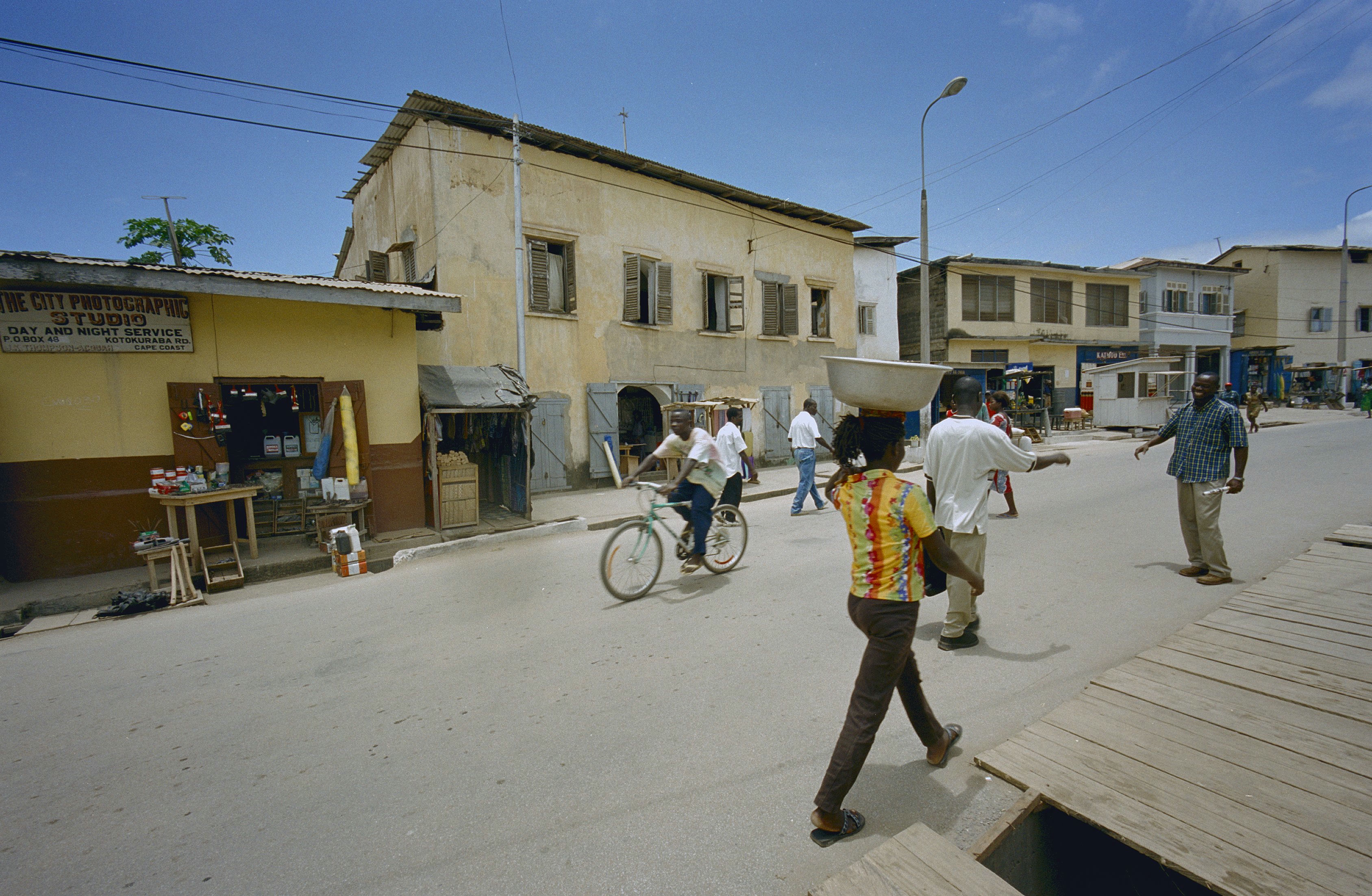
Residents passing by a street in Cape Coast

Transportation in the city is regulated by the Transport Department of the Cape Coast Metropolitan Assembly, with Dennis K. Sulemanu acting as the transport officer of the department.

In certain areas, such as Abura, with a population of 15,000 in 2000 and located close to major establishments, transportation needs are served by local transport (taxis and minibuses). Most residents in Cape Coast do not own personal vehicles, with the exception of the city's middle class, which includes government and educational staff. Congestion is present, made worse by the city being located south of the Accra–Takoradi trunk road.

In 1873, there was a proposal for a line to link the settlements of Cape Coast and Kumasi in order to send troops to fight the Asante. It never came to fruition due to the war ending sooner than expected.

Plans for the construction of an airport for the city were announced by Mahamudu Bawumia at the New Patriotic Party's manifesto launch on August 18, 2024. According to Mahamudu, the US$2 billion in funding has been secured from South Korean investors.

== Government ==
The metropolitan has a mayor–council form of government. The mayor (executive chief) is appointed by the president of Ghana and approved by the city council, the Cape Coast Metropolitan Assembly. The current mayor of Cape Coast is George Justice Arthur [11].

== Demographics ==
Historical population
Year	Pop.	±%
1970	56,601	—
1984	65,763	+16.2%
2000	82,291	+25.1%
2010	108,374	+31.7%
2021	189,925	+75.2%
Source: Ghana Statistical Service. (Note: Sources: 2000 census, 2010 census.)

As of the 2010 census, the population of Cape Coast is 108,374 people which grew to 189,925 by 2021. The city was historically an early centre for Christian missionaries, most notably the Basel missionaries. Christianity is the most practised religion in the city, followed by Islam and traditional religions. The largest ethnic group that resided in the city are the Fante, who are a subgroup of the Akan. The ethnic group's language is Fante.

== Geography ==
Cape Coast is located at 05°06′N 01°15′W (5.100000, -1.250000) and is about 38.4 mi (61.8 km) from Sekondi-Takoradi and approximately 80 mi (130 km) from Accra.

=== Metropolitan Area ===
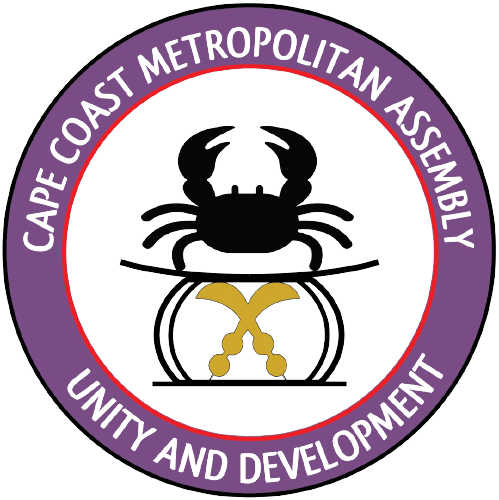

The city resided in the Cape Coast Metropolitan, which has an area size of 122 km^{2} (47 sq mi) and is one of six metropolises in Ghana. The district is bordered to the south by the Gulf of Guinea, the Hemang-Lower Denkyira District to the north, to the west by the Komenda/Edina/Eguafo/Abirem Municipal District, and to the east by the Abura/Asebu/Kwamankese District.

=== Topography ===
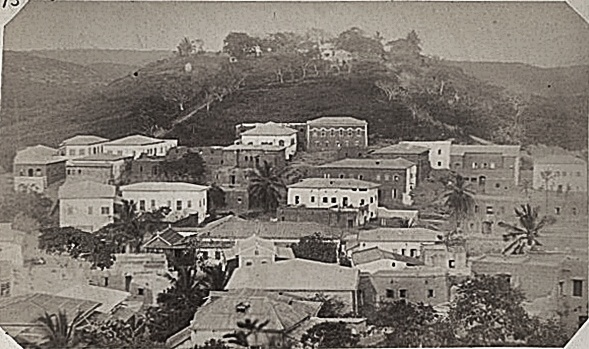
Connor's Hill, Cape Coast (c. 1870)

The city's topography is classified as hilly, the hills overlain by sandy silts. The rock type of the city is dominated by the Birimian formation and batholiths, also consisting of granite and pegmatite. There are valleys of various streams between the hills, with Kakum being the largest stream. The minor streams end in wetlands, the largest of which drains into the Fosu Lagoon at Bakano. In the northern part of the district, however, the landscape is suitable for the cultivation of various crops.

=== Parks ===
Cape Coast is noted for its significant green spaces, but rapid population and infrastructure growth present threats to its vegetation. The city's greenery plays a crucial role in flood management and improving residents' overall well-being. Data from a 2023 study showed that the metropolitan's dense vegetation in 2018 was 47.12 km (29.28 mi), a 24.01% decrease from 71.13 km (44.20 mi) in 1991.

=== Climate ===
Cape Coast has a tropical savanna climate (Köppen: As), with two rainy seasons peaking in May to June and October. The dry periods (harmattan) occur between November and February. The annual rainfall ranges from 90 to 110 mm (3.5 to 4.3 in) along the coast while in the hinterland is between 110 and 160 mm (4.3 and 6.3 in). The average temperatures are around 24 to 32 °C (75 to 90 °F) while the relative humidity is between 60% and 80%.

Climate data for Cape Coast (1981–2010)
Month	Jan	Feb	Mar	Apr	May	Jun	Jul	Aug	Sep	Oct	Nov	Dec	Year
Mean daily maximum °C (°F)	31.9 (89.4)	32.9 (91.2)	32.9 (91.2)	32.7 (90.9)	31.6 (88.9)	30.1 (86.2)	29.1 (84.4)	28.9 (84.0)	29.7 (85.5)	30.9 (87.6)	31.8 (89.2)	31.9 (89.4)	31.2 (88.2)
Mean daily minimum °C (°F)	22.6 (72.7)	24.0 (75.2)	24.2 (75.6)	24.3 (75.7)	24.1 (75.4)	23.5 (74.3)	22.9 (73.2)	22.4 (72.3)	23.0 (73.4)	23.2 (73.8)	23.5 (74.3)	23.1 (73.6)	23.4 (74.1)
Average rainfall mm (inches)	13.5 (0.53)	18.7 (0.74)	64.9 (2.56)	92.8 (3.65)	199.5 (7.85)	209.4 (8.24)	65.9 (2.59)	29.9 (1.18)	58.9 (2.32)	89.8 (3.54)	49.9 (1.96)	29.6 (1.17)	922.8 (36.33)
Average rainy days (≥ 0.1 mm)	1	2	4	6	10	12	6	5	6	7	4	2	65
Source: World Meteorological Organization

== Culture ==
Cape Coast is part of Oguaa Traditional Area. (Note: In Ghana, the term "traditional area" is used to describe an area in which all its community members share the same culture, and are under the same Omanhene (paramount chief).) The main festival celebrated in the city is Fetu Afahye, which takes place on the first Saturday of September every year, attracting people of all different backgrounds.

=== Media ===
The following is a selected list of radio stations in Cape Coast:

FM

- 90.3 Kastle FM
- 93.3 Cape FM
- 92.5 Radio Central
- 100.5 ATL FM
- 102.9 Yes FM
- 87.7 Eagle FM
- 90.9 Sompa FM
- 107.5 Live FM

== Economy ==
=== Agriculture ===
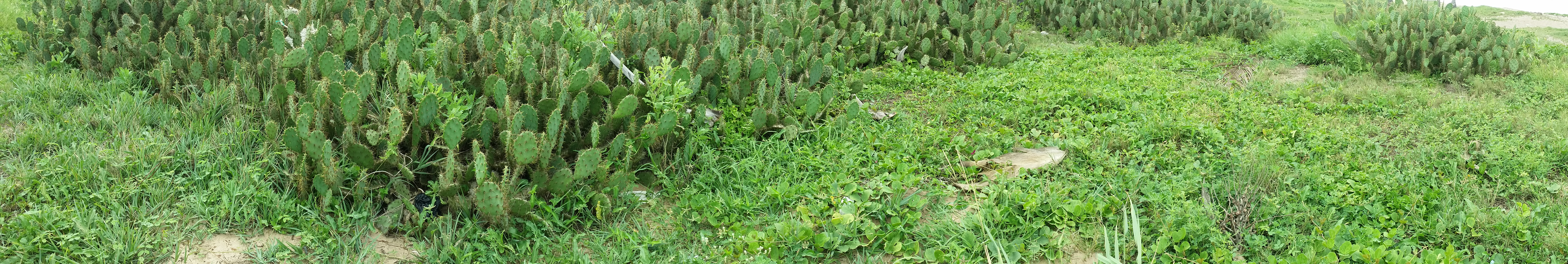
Cactus at a beach in Cape Coast

Agriculture in the city is managed by the Department of Agriculture of the metropolitan area. The head of the department is Olympia Enyonam Williams. Results from a 2005 study found that Cape Coast has close to no irrigated vegetable farming taking place within the city proper except for the premises of the University of Cape Coast. Close to 90% of vegetables consumed by the city's residents come from sources such as Kumasi and as far as Togo and its border with Ghana.

The city's topography makes farming difficult to achieve. There are limited suitable areas that could be used for farming; those that meet the criteria are prone to floods. This makes Cape Coast and its surrounding areas one of the most water-scarce in Ghana, resulting in most of the residents resorting to fishing.

=== Fishing ===
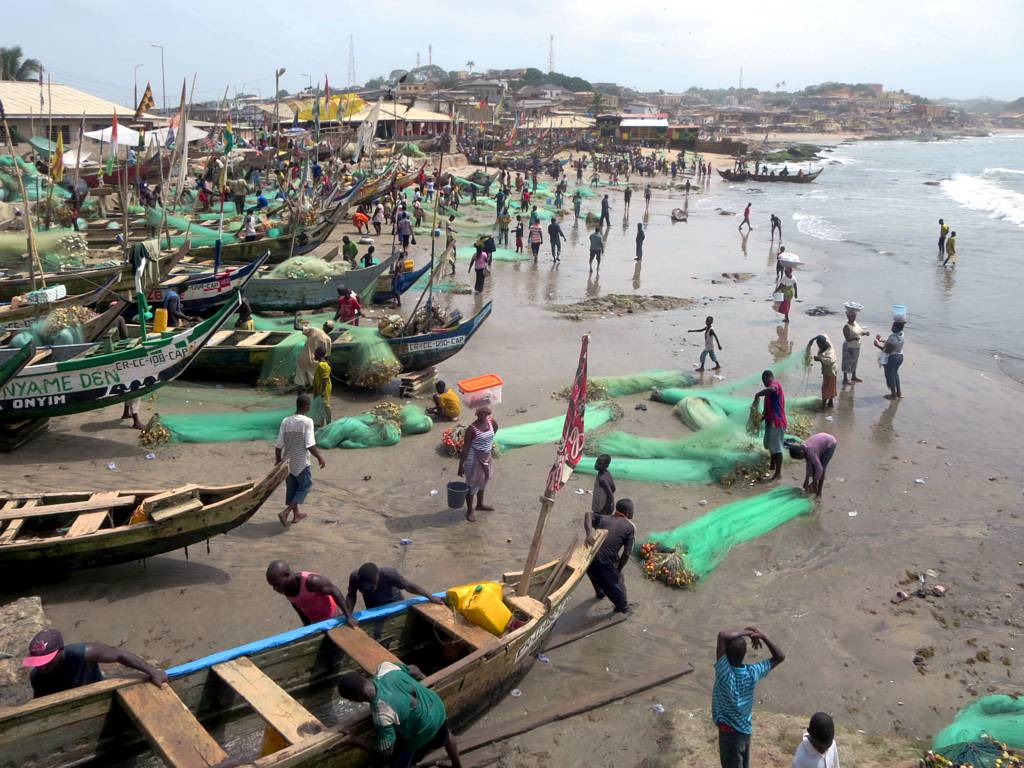
A beach at Cape Coast occupied by fishers

Fishing provides a livelihood to most of the residents of Cape Coast, who live in the southern fishing communities. Trade, sewing, and carving are also sources of income alongside fishing. Children are also involved in the occupation as a way of participation and respect.

Due to the decline of fish populations, which many blamed on the fishing practice called "Saiko", where unwanted fish captured by large ships are exchanged at sea for goods such as fruit, water, and livestock bought by locals, fishers' livelihoods are at stake since their lives depend on the occupation.

=== Service ===
In recent years, 25.1% of Cape Coast's employed population works in service-related jobs, such as wholesale and retail. The city is home to the Kotokuraba Market, the largest market in the city. The triangular-shaped market was developed in the late 1930s by the colonial government. Since then, it has become one of the most significant sources of income for the municipal authority in the city, employing about 35% of the female employed population.

=== Tourism ===
Cape Coast has experienced an increasing number of tourists due to attractions such as Cape Coast Castle (World Heritage Site), Kakum National Park, and the PANAFEST festival. Although access to areas such as compounds that house shrines, such as the "Tree Shrine," a silk cotton tree near Anaafo market, is prohibited. The city's infrastructure, however, is underdeveloped, impacting the quality of life for the residents and the overall experience of the tourists. As of 2000, there are no streets in the city that prioritize pedestrian access. Residents often are not aware of the role that they play in the tourism industry.

Cape Coast's tourism sector was looked after by the Central Regional Development Commission (CEDECOM). In order to fund the development of the sector, CEDECOM reached out to UNDP and USAID, which in turn contacted the Debt for Development Coalition (DDC) for a "debt swap" arrangement. After cooperating with multiple parties, the Natural Resource Conservation and Historic Preservation project was launched. The project focused on the rehabilitation and transformation of the city's castles and fortresses into heritage creations and resulted in the creation of the Kakum National Park.

==== State visits ====
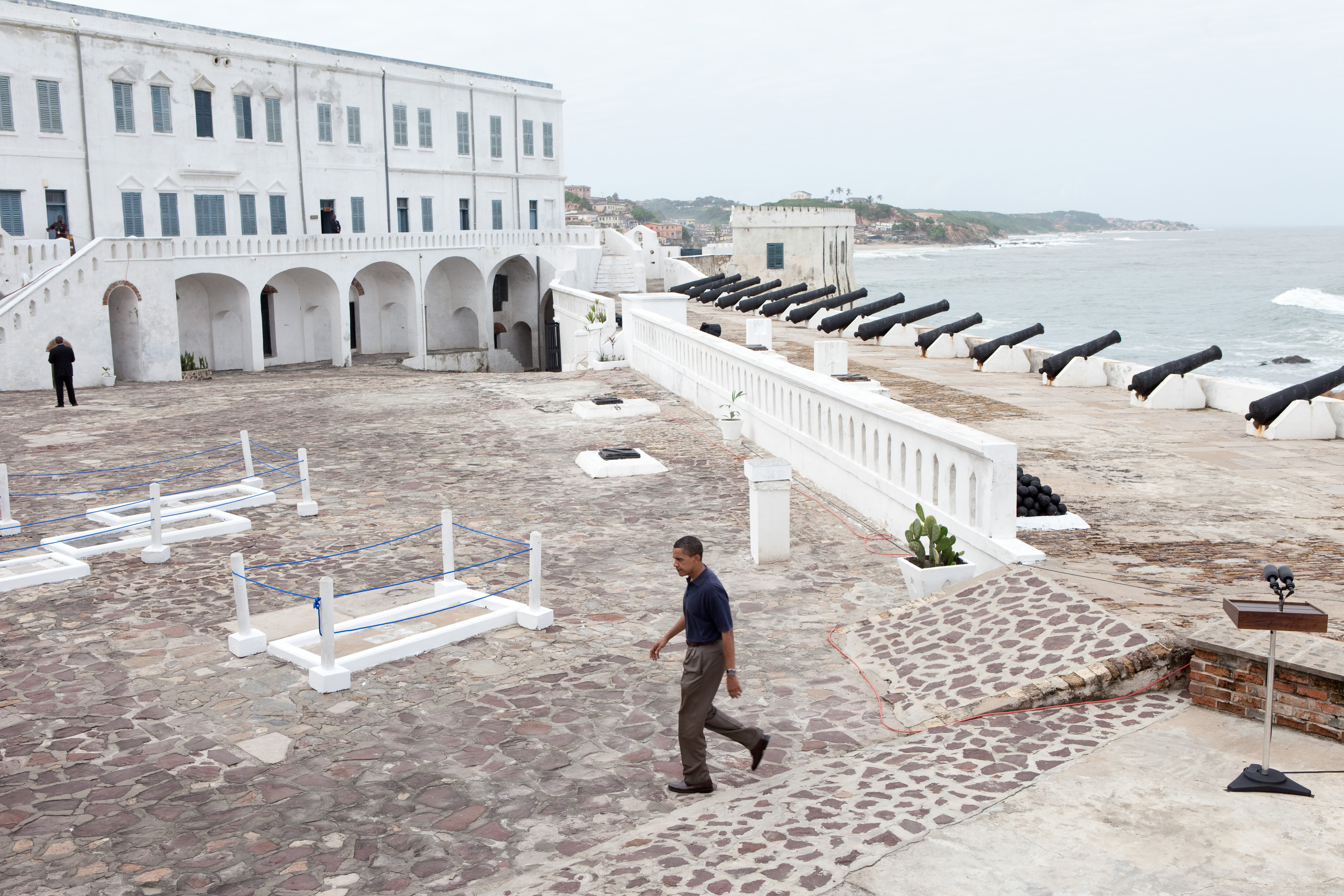
Barack Obama finishes an address following a tour with his family of Cape Coast Castle on July 11, 2009

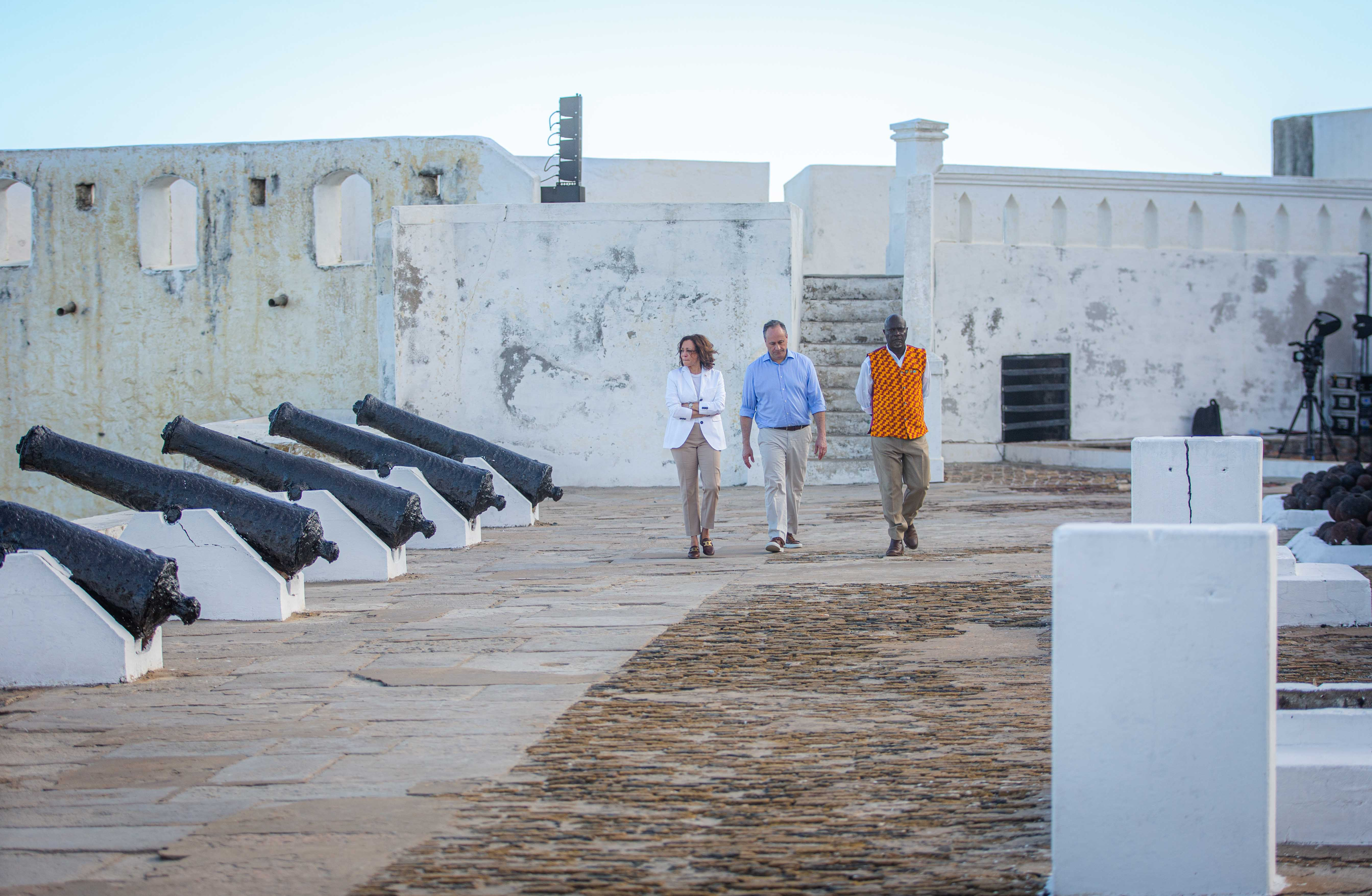
Kamala Harris walking around Cape Coast Castle during her 26–29 March 2023 trip

Both former United States president Barack Obama and vice president Kamala Harris have visited Cape Coast, along with Cape Coast Castle. Obama visited on 11 July 2009, while Kamala arrived on 28 March 2023. Obama's trip marked the first time during his presidency that he had visited sub-Saharan Africa.

During his visit to the castle, Obama made a remark about the castle's history with the history of African Americans.

And I think, as Americans, and as African Americans, obviously there's a special sense that on the one hand this place was a place of profound sadness; on the other hand, it is here where the journey of much of the African American experience began. And symbolically, to be able to come back with my family, with Michelle and our children, and see the portal through which the diaspora began, but also to be able to come back here in celebration with the people of Ghana of the extraordinary progress that we've made because of the courage of so many, black and white, to abolish slavery and ultimately win civil rights for all people, I think is a source of hope. It reminds us that, as bad as history can be, it's also possible to overcome.

=== Non-governmental organisations ===
Cape Coast is home to many NGOs, some of which have limited human resources due to financial pushbacks. These NGOs address and confront social issues in the metropolitan area as a whole. Some NGOs with operations in the city are the Seeds of Sovereignty and the Abraham Smiles Foundation. A 2021 study found that most people do show interest in participating in NGO-related activities, depending on what the organization in question revolves around.

== Education ==
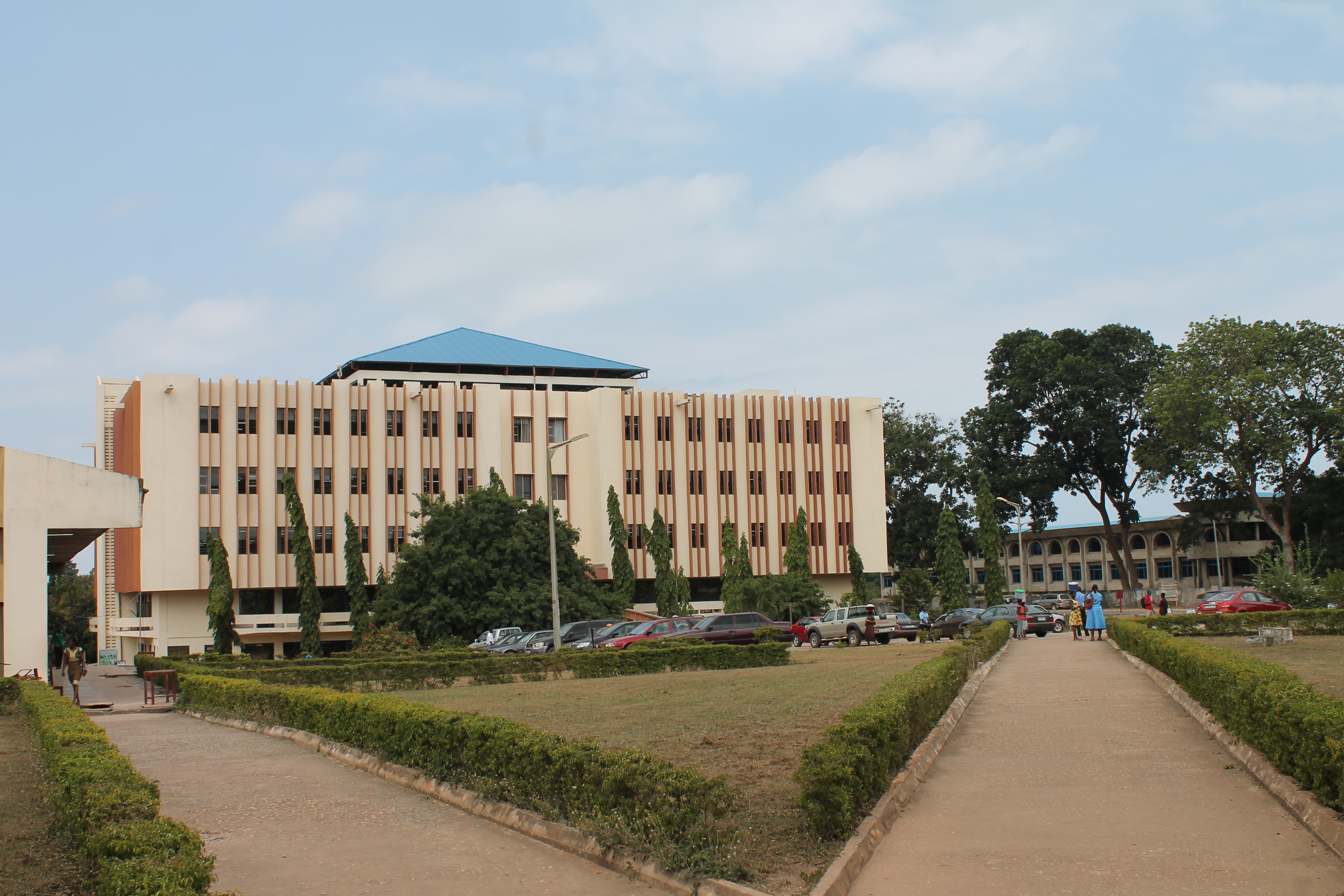
University of Cape Coast

Cape Coast is home to the main campus of the University of Cape Coast (UCC). The institution was established in 1962 as a university college and had special relations with the University of Ghana. On 1 October 1971, the college gained the status of a full and independent university by an Act of Parliament: the University of Cape Coast Act, 1971, and the University of Cape Coast Law, 1992.

The Cape Coast Technical University is also located in the city. It opened in 1986, operating under the Ghana Education Service to offer intermediary courses. In 1992, following the Polytechnic Law (PNDCL 321), the university was upgraded to the status of a tertiary institution. It currently stands as a technical university.

The following is a list of Cape Coast's secondary and technical schools:

- Wesley Girls' High School
- St. Augustine College
- Holy Child High School, Ghana
- Mfantsipim School
- Adisadel College
- Aggrey Memorial Senior High School
- Ghana National College
- Mfantsiman Girls' Senior High School
- Edinaman Senior High School
- Cape Coast Technical Institute
- Asuansi Technical Institute
- Academy of Christ the King Senior High School
- Cape Coast International Senior High School
- University Practice Senior High School
- St. Nicholas Seminary Senior High School
- Efutu Senior High Technical School
- Sammo Senior High School
- Commercial Service Institute (CSI)
- Oguaa Senior High Technical School

== Healthcare ==
Cape Coast has two principal hospitals: the Cape Coast Teaching Hospital and the Cape Coast Metro Hospital. The Cape Coast Teaching Hospital, popularly known as "Interberton" by the locals, was the first of a series of regional hospitals established by the Ministry of Health. Full operations began on 12 August 1998, and the hospital was awarded the Best Regional Hospital in 2003. The facility remains the largest hospital in the region.

Cape Coast Metro Hospital is a 115-bed facility. It was the main hospital serving the area until Cape Coast Teaching Hospital was built, when it started to fall into disarray due to neglect. In 2024, renovations were announced for the facility, totaling around US$77,452.67.

== Sport ==
The city is home to the Cape Coast Sports Stadium, a multi-purpose stadium that is currently home to the Cape Coast Ebusua Dwarfs. Construction of the stadium began in 2012 and officially opened on 3 May 2016. It was financed and designed by China.

The Ebusua Dwarfs, a professional football club based in Cape Coast with a current squad of 30 players, competes in the Ghana Premier League.

The city is also home to the Venomous Vipers, a professional football club. The current Board Chairman of the team is Kweku Ackah-Yensu, who took office in 2022. They play against the Ebusua Dwarfs.

== Notable people ==
- Frederick Acheampong, football administrator and media personality
- Nana Amba Eyiaba I, queen mother
- Kwesi Amissah-Arthur, fifth vice-president of Ghana
- Gifty Anti, journalist
- B. J. Da Rocha, founding member of the New Patriotic Party and served as its first national chairman
- Kwesi Brew, poet and diplomat
- Joey B, musician
- Jane Naana Opoku-Agyemang, former Minister for education [51]
- Efua Sutherland, playwright, author, and child advocate

== Sister cities ==
The following is a list of sister cities of Cape Coast, designated by Sister Cities International:

- Bonn, Germany (2012)
- Buffalo, United States (1976)
- Hanover Park, United States (2019)
- New Orleans, United States (2019)

== See also ==
- Cape Coast Castle
- Elmina
- List of cities in Ghana
- Roman Catholic Archdiocese of Cape Coast
