= William Towerson (16th-century merchant) =

English merchant

William Towerson was an English merchant who wrote brief narratives of three trading expeditions to North-West Africa (which he called Guinea) occurring in 1555–1556, 1556–1557, and 1558. These were collected and published by Richard Hakluyt.

The expeditions were apparently funded by the Company of Merchant Adventurers to New Lands. His ships bartered metal basins, bracelets (manillios), and cloth in exchange for ivory and gold. Often the Africans haggled well. His competition consisted of similar French expeditions, mainly friendly, which he commented had cloth that was more prized by the African locals. The local Portuguese, who also had local fort-settlements, were belligerent in defending what they viewed as their monopoly. Some of the tribes he met had fear of the raiding Portuguese, although on his second voyage, he encountered some tribes that recalled the extraction by a prior English expedition by John Lok of a handful of black Africans. Towerson claimed these men were being taught the English language so that they could be utilized as translators for future trading missions, and such Africans appears to have accompanied Towerson on the second and third trip. Towerson makes few observations about the locals: he lists a few phrases he putatively learned, and derides the nakedness of the natives, specially the women.

Little else is known of the life of Towerson.

== 1555-1556 expedition ==
Towerson left in late September from the Isle of Wight with two ships, the Hart and Hinde, captained by masters John Ralph and William Carter respectively in a voyage to River de Sestos in Guinea. By October they departed Dartmouth, and starting November 3 sighted the islands of Porto Santo and Madeira. They did not stop at the Portuguese islands. By November 7, they passed the Canary Islands, and some three weeks later they passed the islands of Cape Verde, they soon sought trade for ivory with locals on the coast. They proceeded past Cape Three Points and the town of "Don John" (likely São Jorge da Mina). Soon they were in regions bartering gold. They would return in February, reaching Ireland by May.

== 1556-1557 expedition ==
In November 1556, the expedition left Plymouth with three boats, of 100,60 and 16 tons. The smaller vessel was scuttled off the coast of Africa when the rudder broke. By 30 December they arrived to Guinea. They passed the town of Dondou and the Portuguese castle of Mina. They visited the town of Lagova and Mowre. On 27 March they left Sierra Leone and were back in England by April 29.

== 1558 expedition ==
In January 30, 1558, the expedition left Plymouth with five boats. In the Canary Islands, they encountered a Spanish fleet of 19 vessels travelling to the Americas. Relations were friendly with the Spaniards. They traded at sites on the mainland, including Lagua, Perinnen, Weamba (Winneba), Shama, and Perecow (Senya Beraku). They returned in October of that year.

== Notes ==
- The Principal Navigations, Voyages, Traffiques & Discoveries of the English Nation Made by Sea Or Over-land to the Remote and Farthest Distant Quarters of the Earth at Any Time Within the Compasse of These 1600 Yeeres Issue 6

By Richard Hakluyt (1903).
