= Cape Coast Technical Institute =

Institution located at Cape Coast in the Central Region of Ghana

Coordinates: 7°21′9.756″N 2°19′56.316″W

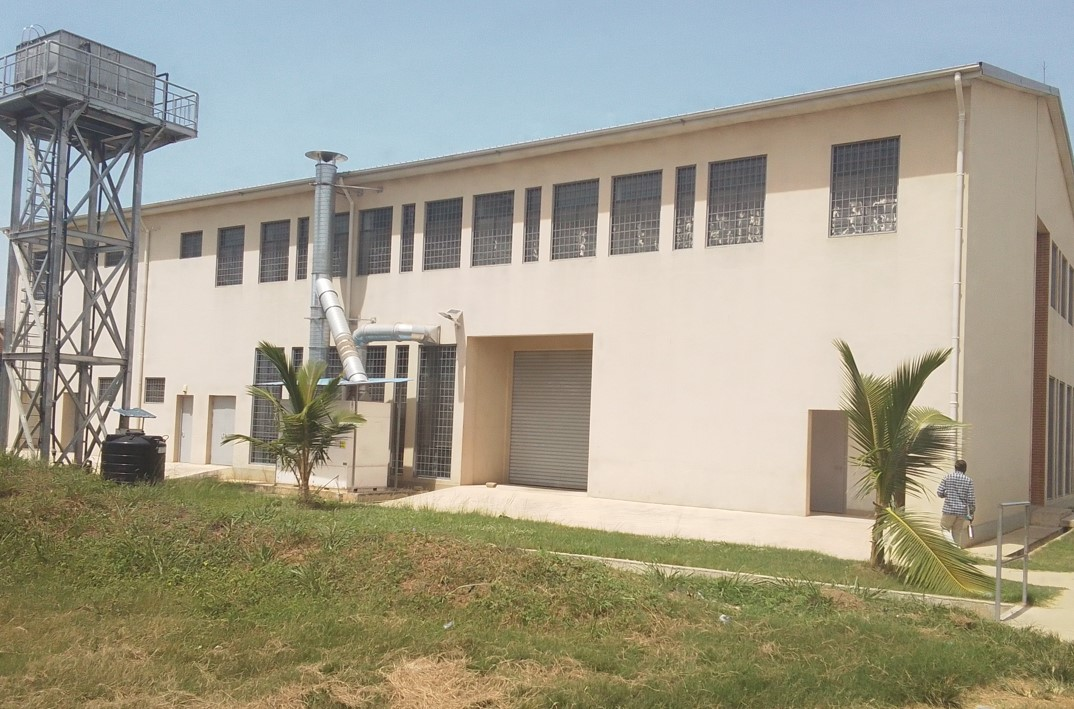
- Motto: Mbɔdzenbɔ Wie Kunyimdzi
- Type: Public mixed gender
- Established: 1955
- Founders: Joseph Kadish Abraham

The Cape Coast Technical Institute is an institute established in Ghana in 1955 by the late Joseph Kadish Abraham.It was formerly known as the College of Architecture and underwent several name changes until 1976 when it was absorbed into the national system by the Government of Ghana and adopted its present name.

== Programs ==
- Motor Vehicle Engineering
- Mechanical Engineering Technology
- Electrical Engineering Technology
- Refrigeration And Air-Condition Technology
- Creative Art Technology
- Plumbing And Gas Fitting Technology
- Furniture Design And Construction Wood Construction Technology
- Building Construction Technology
- Architectural Drafti

== Gallery ==
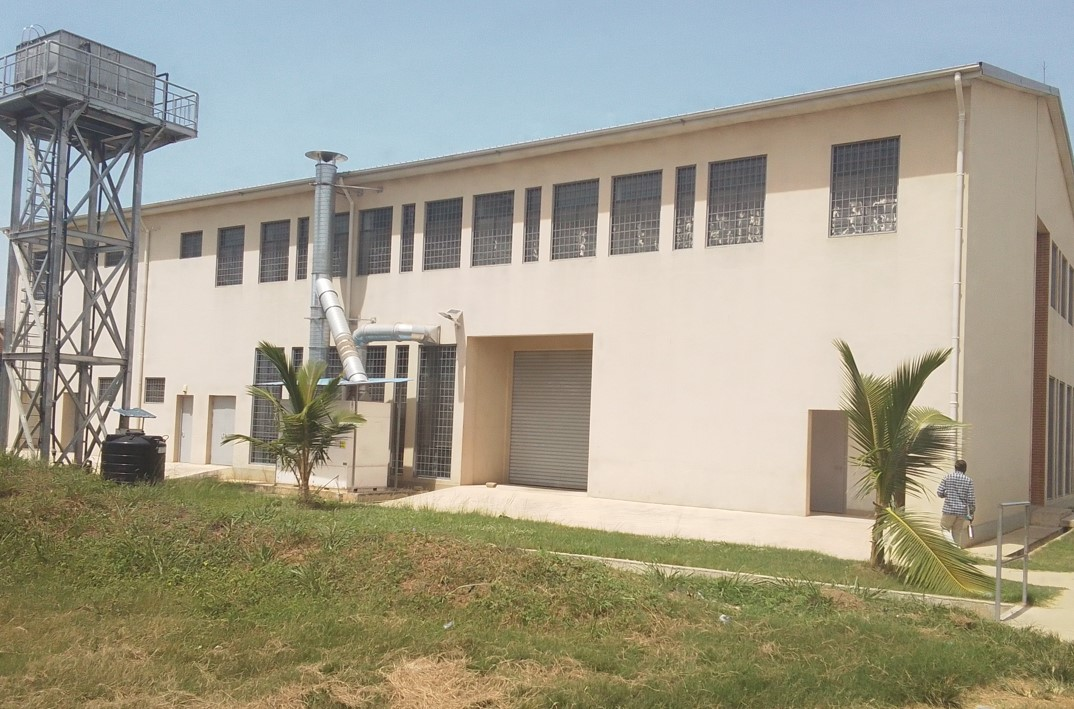
AVIC

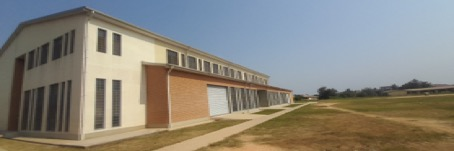
AVIC
