= Fosu Lagoon =

Lagoon in Ghana

- Location within Ghana
- Location: Cape Coast
- Coordinates: 5.108°N 1.259°W
- Basin countries: Ghana

The Fosu Lagoon is a body of water, located in the area of Cape Coast in the Central Region of Ghana, that empties into the Atlantic Ocean. A major source of livelihood for its surrounding communities over the years, the lagoon has been the subject of studies on the impact of pollution and ecological degradation.

The Fosu Lagoon plays a significant part in the annual Fetu Afahye festival. On the last day of August a vigil takes place at the lagoon, and the following day the Omanhene (paramount chief) lifts the week-long ban on fishing there.
