= Euvin Naidoo =

South African businessman (born 1971)

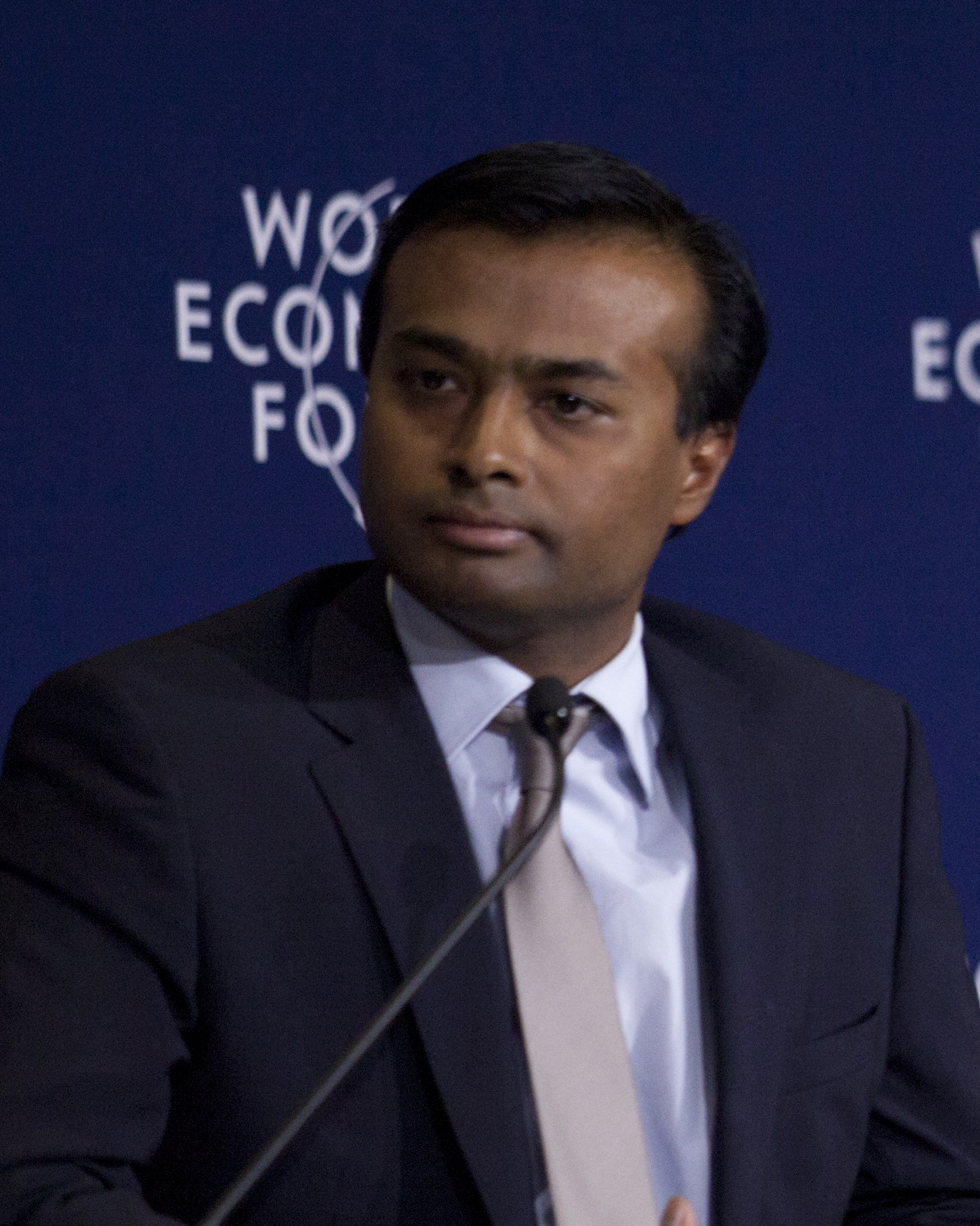
- Naidoo in 2012
- Born: 1971 (age 54–55)
- Education: Harvard Business School (MBA)

Euvin Naidoo (born 1971) is a South African banking executive based in Johannesburg.

An alumnus of the management consulting firm McKinsey & Co., Naidoo has been recognized by Forbes as one of the leading advocates for western investment in Africa. He is also the president of the South Africa Chamber of Commerce in America (SACCA).

== Career ==
In 2003, Naidoo co-authored the Harvard Business School case, "Nelson Mandela, Turnaround Leader", with economist Rosabeth Moss Kanter.

In 2007, as president and CEO of SACCA, Naidoo led the launch of the Africa Entrepreneurship Platform, which was featured at the Clinton Global Initiative's annual gathering and has been acknowledged by New York City mayor Michael Bloomberg as helping to strengthen business ties across borders.

In February 2009, Naidoo was selected as a Young Global Leader by the World Economic Forum.

In 2011, Forbes named him among the 10 Youngest Power Men in Africa.

At the 2012 World Economic Forum on Africa, Naidoo was chosen as one of the five "Rising Stars of Africa".

In August 2012, Naidoo was recruited onto the Global Agenda Council for the World Economic Forum.

In his part-time and personal capacity, Naidoo is the visiting lecturer for private equity and service operations at the University of the Witwatersrand's Business School, the WITS Business School in Johannesburg.

Naidoo joined colleagues to serve on the Admissions Board of the Harvard Business School. He has also served as a judge for several years as part of the Harvard Business School's Annual Business Plan Contest, an event that attracts entrants from around the world.

== Personal life ==
Naidoo is a graduate of the Harvard Business School. He is married to Roshini Moodley Naidoo, a medical doctor.
