= Dutch–Ahanta War =

Date	1837–1839
Location	Dutch Gold Coast (modern day Ghana)
Result	Dutch victory: Ahanta becomes a Dutch protectorate

Belligerents
Netherlands	Ahanta kingdom

Commanders and leaders
Hendrik Tonneboeijer; Jan Verveer	Badu Bonsu II

Strength
200 men (first expedition)	Unknown

Casualties and losses
47 dead	Unknown

The Dutch–Ahanta War was a conflict between the Netherlands and the Ahanta between 1837 and 1839. Beginning with a mere economic dispute between the Ahanta and the Dutch, who were based at the Dutch Gold Coast, the conflict ended with the hanging of Ahanta king Badu Bonsu II and the reorganization of the Ahanta state, establishing a Dutch protectorate over the Ahanta.

== Background ==
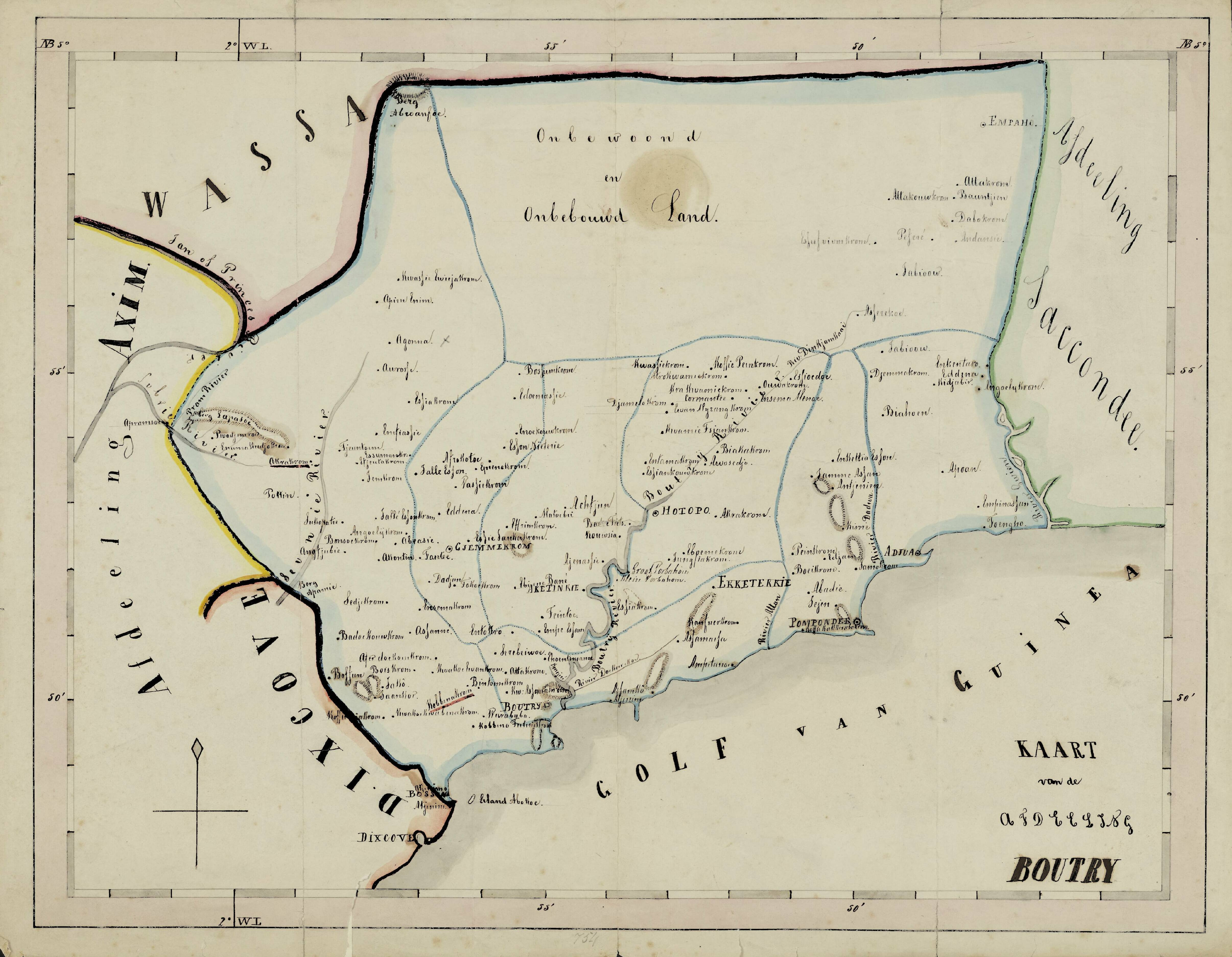
Map of the District of Butre, made in 1859 by the Dutch resident at Fort Batenstein. The town of Busua, of which Badu Bonsu II was chief, is shown on the coast, on the border between the District of Butre and the British District of Dixcove.

From the time the European powers settled trading posts on the Gold Coast until the second half of the nineteenth century, they displayed little interest in establishing territorial control beyond the forts they built in agreement with the local population. The Dutch were no exception in this regard. After they dislodged the Swedish Africa Company from the Ahanta area in what is now Western Ghana, they signed the Treaty of Butre with the Ahanta in 1656, which nominally subjected the Ahanta to Dutch rule and allowed the Dutch to trade with the Ahanta from their basis at Fort Batenstein.

While initially the European powers came to the Gold Coast primarily to trade in gold the trade in slaves began to gain prominence by the second half of the seventeenth century. This trade came to a rather sudden halt through the passing of the Abolition of the Slave Trade Act 1807 by the United Kingdom, which was subsequently taken over by the Dutch by a royal decree of June 1814 and an Anglo-Dutch Slave Trade Treaty signed in May 1818. These changing economic conditions caused tensions between the coastal peoples on the Gold Coast and the European powers with whom they were trading. Seeking a way to return their colony to a profit, the Dutch sent out a great mission to the Ashanti Empire in the Gold Coast interior in early 1837, under the leadership of General Jan Verveer. The primary purpose of this mission was to tempt the Ashanti, with whom the Dutch had been allied since the mission of David van Nyendael of 1702, into signing a treaty allowing the Dutch to recruit soldiers for the Dutch colonial army. The eventual success of the mission was met with suspicion by the other peoples of the Gold Coast.

== The course of the war ==
=== The original conflict ===
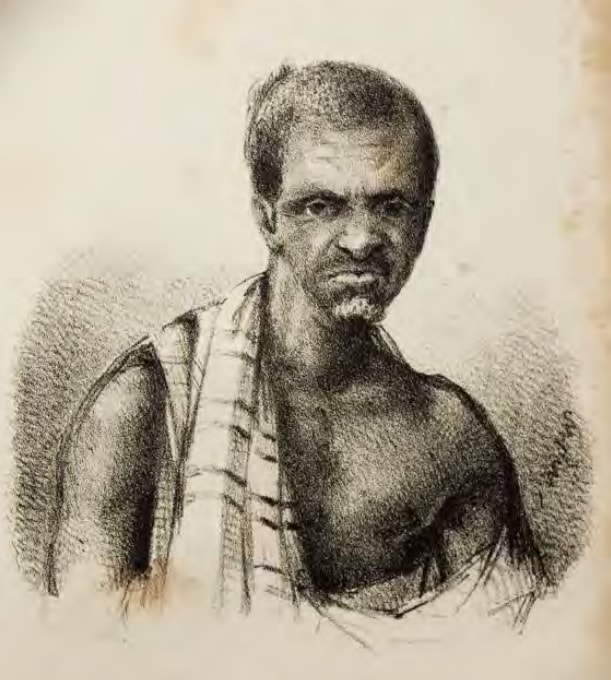
Badu Bonsu II as he is portrayed in Douchez (1839).

From the early 1830s, the Dutch had a difficult relationship with the King of Ahanta Badu Bonsu II, who had his palace at Busua. According to Tengbergen and Douchez, the direct cause of what would become an armed conflict between the Dutch and the Ahanta, was a dispute Badu Bonsu II had with chief Etteroe of Sekondi. Etteroe had panyarred a woman and a child of King Badu Bonsu's for a debt of 14 ounces of gold Badu Bonsu II had with him. King Badu Bonsu II, however, learnt that Etteroe was trading gunpowder with Wassa, a neighbouring state with whom the Ahanta had a conflict, while this trade had been forbidden by Badu Bonsu II.

After Badu Bonsu II settled his debt with Etteroe and the woman and child were released, Badu Bonsu II requested a palaver with Etteroe in the presence of the Dutch commandant Gerard Smulders of Fort San Sebastian at Shama. Badu Bonsu II accused Etteroe of circumventing the ban on gunpowder trade with Wassa, and eventually Etteroe was condemned to pay a fine of 6 ounces of gold and to pay the process costs deemed 8 ounces of gold, equalling the 14 ounces Badu Bonsu II had earlier paid to Etteroe.

Shortly afterwards, Etteroe accused Badu Bonsu II of extortion, which led commandant Smulders to summon Badu Bonsu II to Fort San Sebastian once more. Commandant Smulders was not present at Badu Bonsu's arrival, however, possibly because Badu Bonsu II also had a debt with him and wanted to annoy him. A humiliated Badu Bonsu II returned home, leading commandant Smulders to refer the case to the governor in Elmina, Hendrik Tonneboeijer, who on three separate occasions summoned Badu Bonsu II to Elmina, all to no avail.

Tonneboeijer then sent the military commander of Elmina, George Maassen, to commander Adriaan Cremer of Fort Batenstein at Butre, to summon Badu Bonsu II by force. Eventually, on 23 October 1837, Badu Bonsu II arrived at Butre in the company of armed men, but refused to climb the hill leading to Fort Batenstein, arguing that he wished to discuss the matter in the house of trader Anthonie Ruhle. Maassen and Cremer went down to Ruhle's house, where an altercation followed, which left both Dutchmen dead after they had fired warning shots.

=== Tonneboeijer assembles an expeditionary force ===
When the young and inexperienced interim governor Tonneboeijer heard of the news, he immediately assembled a force of 130 men to attack Badu Bonsu II, and left Elmina only two hours later, without as much as a plan of attack. Both the British governor at Cape Coast and the King of Elmina pleaded with him to postpone his attack, while the commandants of both Fort San Sebastian at Shama and Fort Orange at Sekondi warned him that his force was too small and that a large army had gathered to oppose him. Tonneboeijer, who already had the reputation of being a hothead, would not listen, however, and on the morning of 28 October 1837, he and his army were ambushed on the beach near Takoradi. Within minutes, 30 men were killed, including Tonneboeijer himself and four other colonial officials.

News of the onslaught reached The Hague by the end of February 1838, where it was met with shock and disbelief. General Jan Verveer, who had just returned to the Netherlands from his mission to Ashanti, was sent out again to restore order in the colony. Together with lieutenant H.F. Tengbergen, who was second in command, he had an expeditionary force of 11 officers and 200 troops at his disposal to "quell the insurrection." Also on the ships that departed for Elmina were a new governor, Hendrik Bosch, and new administrative officers for the colony. In May 1838, the expedition landed in Elmina, where they were received by interim governor Anthony van der Eb.

=== Verveer's attack on Ahanta ===
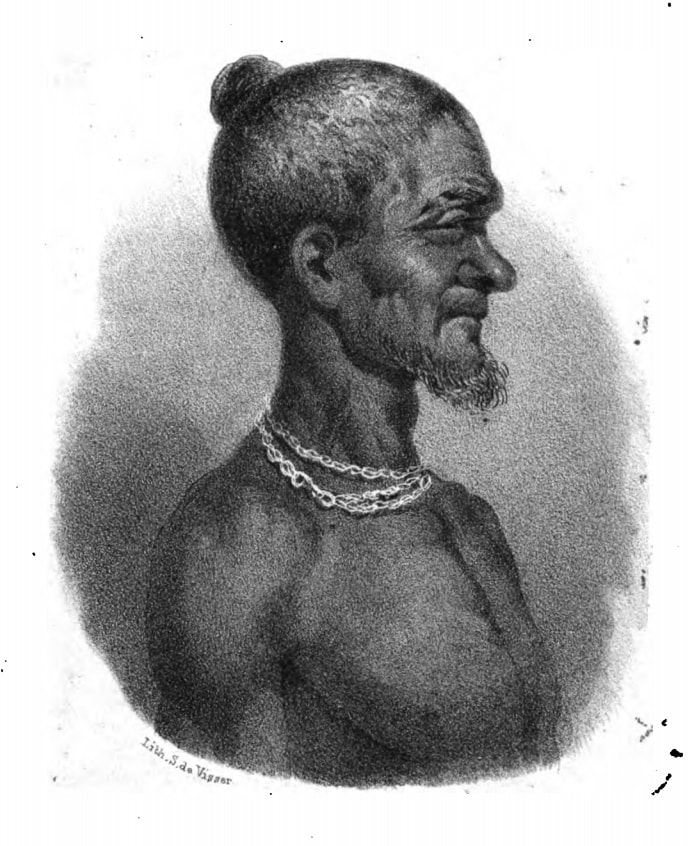
A portrait of Badu Bonsu II drawn by lieutenant commander Willem Stort during the king's captivity. The portrait was published in Tengbergen (1839).

After his arrival, Verveer took some time to form a coalition with other coastal peoples to attack Ahanta. An offer by the Asantehene to send 30,000 troops was rejected as it was seen as a cover by the Ashanti to gain a firm grip on the coastal peoples, but smaller offers of help by Enimir, Axim and Sekondi were accepted. On 30 June 1838, Verveer's force, which had been supplemented by 2,000 Elmina troops, set out to Ahanta.

Badu Bonsu's messengers had in the meanwhile plead for a peaceful solution, and offered up to 200 ounces of gold for Badu Bonsu's pardon. Most Ahanta, at least those not too implicated in the earlier altercations, had already submitted themselves, and the campaign, which lasted for a month, mainly involved chasing rebels and destroying Ahanta towns such as Busua and Takoradi.

Badu Bonsu II was relinquished even before the expedition reached Ahanta proper, extradited by one of his people for 10 ounces of gold. He was then trialed at an ad-hoc open-field court-martial and given the death sentence on 25 July 1838. He was publicly hanged on the spot where Maassen and Cremer had been shot. According to Douchez, Badu Bonsu's head was then severed from his body by a medical officer of Elmina by the name of Schillet, to be preserved as a curiosity.

Five other leaders of the rebellion were subsequently hanged at Elmina on 20 August 1838. Thirteen others were condemned to a forced exile to the Dutch East Indies, where they were to work government coffee plantations on Nusa Kambangan, a prison island. A final thirty-six rebels were forced to work at the coffee and cotton plantations in Elmina. Governor Hendrik Bosch then granted amnesty to the rest of the Ahanta people during his installation on 8 August 1838.

=== The role of Pieter Bartels ===
Both Tengbergen and Douchez report that many saw a Euro-African by the name of Pieter Bartels as the main instigator of the conflict. According to witnesses, it was Bartels who, after Maassen fired a warning shot at Butre, shouted "Cowards! You are twenty times stronger than the whitemen! Shoot them!" Bartels was indeed exiled to the Dutch East Indies for his involvement in the war.

According to Douchez, it was personal revenge that drove Bartels to his actions. Pieter Bartels, son of governor Cornelius Ludewich Bartels and a local woman, and half-brother of the wealthy and influential Euro-African trader Carel Hendrik Bartels, had initially made a promising career in the administration of the Dutch Gold Coast. As a native speaker of Fante, Dutch and English, his position as a mediator had been a great asset to the administration, and in reward he was installed as commandant of Fort Batenstein at Butre in 1834. His career came to a sudden end when on 3 March 1836, George Maassen—the same person that was later shot at Butre—and Hendrik Tonneboeijer—who later would become interim governor—complained to then-governor Christiaan Lans about Bartels' behaviour towards them. According to Douchez, the conflict between the three originated with a spirits-induced boxing match between Tonneboeijer and Bartels at Shama, which had been won by Bartels. According to Douchez, Tonneboeijer was greatly upset to have lost a match against a Euro-African. Not able to cool Tonneboeijer down, Bartels put Tonneboeijer in Fort San Sebastian's prison, of which Bartels was the commandant at the time. Governor Lans took sides with Tonneboeijer in the conflict and saw Bartels as unfit for government service. Bartels was given an honourable discharge from government service on 11 June 1836 and settled as a trader in Ahanta.

Douchez' account might seem far-fetched at first, but according to historian Albert van Dantzig, his version of the story is backed up by archival documents. Not only was Bartels' forced resignation chronicled, Tonneboeijer's erratic behaviour and hot temper were also documented: in 1835, Tonneboeijer had to be relieved of his command of Fort Saint Anthony at Axim because he had set parts of the town on fire, only to be accused of extortion later that year and serving eight days in confinement on Fort Coenraadsburg for absence without leave. During his tenure as interim governor, Tonneboeijer set fire to the canoe men quarter of Elmina as he judged they had been to slow in meeting his requests for assistance, and forcefully cleared another part of the overcrowded town for a new street plan. Tonneboeijer was hated by the local population and the news of his death was met with a sigh of relief. It is therefore highly likely that Lans' siding with Tonneboeijer in his dispute with Bartels had more to do with Tonneboeijer's colour of skin rather than with reason.

Racism is also evidenced in Verveer's letter to the governor-general of the Dutch East Indies in which he explained Bartels' exile. Verveer recommended Bartels for a lower administrative position in the Dutch East Indies, as his career in the administration of the Dutch Gold Coast had shown his capabilities. Verveer argued, however, that after his dismissal, Bartels' "inborn character, always prone to violence and drunkenness, had worsened" and how he "finally became morally a negro."

== Aftermath ==
Citing provisions in the Treaty of Butre, the 1656 treaty which governed the relations between the Dutch and Ahanta, the Dutch reorganised the Ahanta state after the war, appointing Anthony van der Eb, the new Dutch commandant at Fort Batenstein, as Vice-Governor of the Ahanta Protectorate (Dutch: vice-gouverneur voor het Ahantasche Landschap), and keeping the country under close control with an enlarged military and civilian presence. Pieter Bartels was to remain in exile in the Dutch East Indies, where he died in Semarang in 1847. Despite the warning of Verveer that Bartels should not come in contact with the African recruits for the Dutch East Indian Army, Bartels knowledge of Fante proved too worthwhile: Bartels translation of army regulations into Fante and Twi was widely used in the army.

The head of king Badu Bonsu II was rediscovered in the Leiden University Medical Center (LUMC) in the Netherlands by Dutch author Arthur Japin, who had read the account of the head during research for his 1997 novel De zwarte met het witte hart. Japin found the head in 2005, stored in formaldehyde at the LUMC. In March 2009, government officials announced that the head would be returned to its homeland for proper burial, a promise fulfilled on July 23, 2009, after a ceremony was held in The Hague.

== See also ==
- Treaty of Butre
- Dutch Gold Coast expedition of 1869–1870
