= Treaty of Butre =

1656 treaty between the Netherlands and Ahanta

Treaty of Butre (1656)
Dedication of Upper Ahanta and Butre
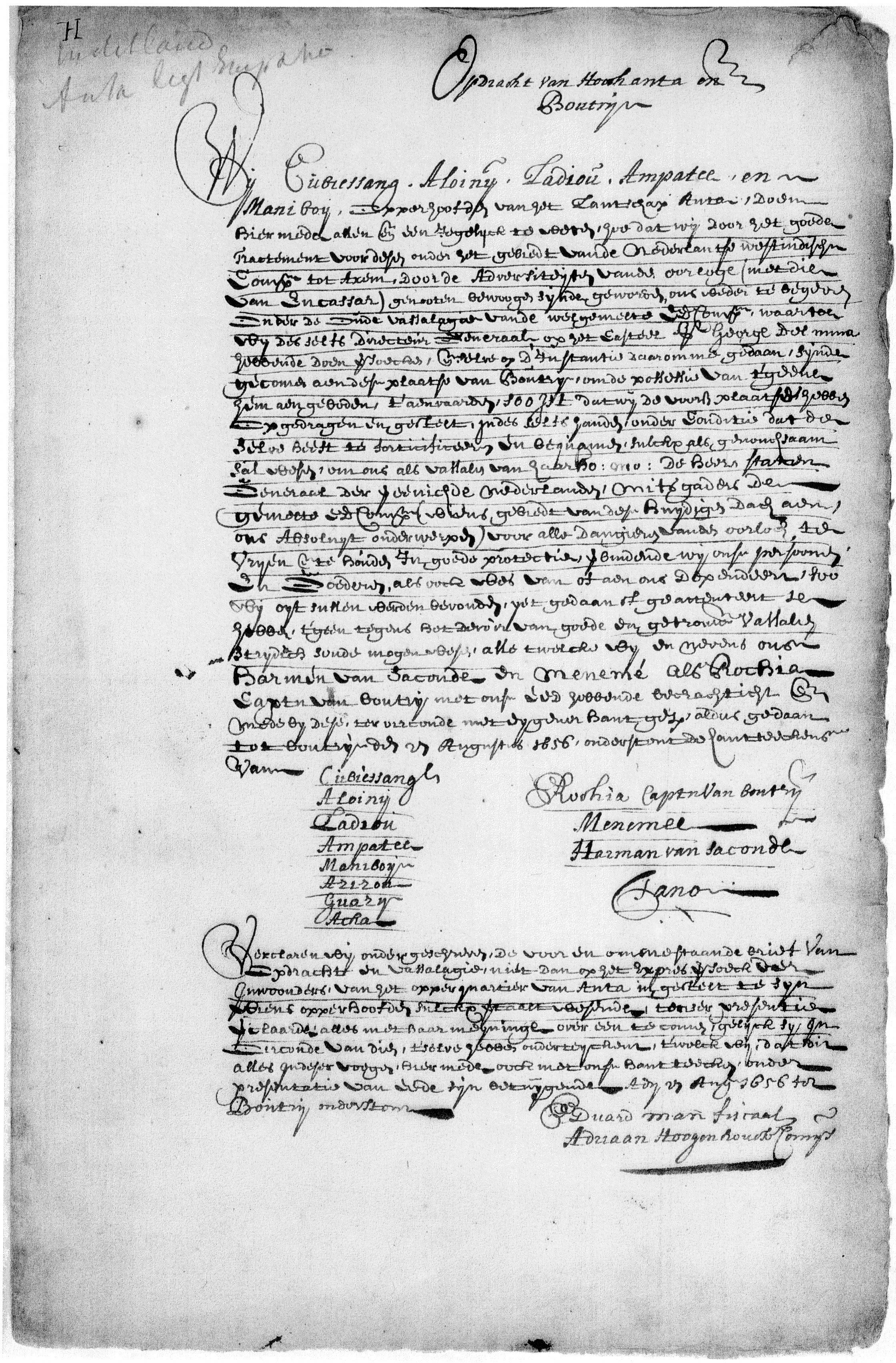
- Copy of the Treaty of Butre (1656) between the Netherlands and Ahanta (Gold Coast). Nationaal Archief, coll. OWIC 12.
- Type: Creation of a protectorate
- Signed: 27 August 1656
- Location: Butre, Ahanta (now Ghana)
- Effective: 27 August 1656
- Expiration: 6 April 1872
- Signatories: Chiefs of Ahanta; Director general of the Dutch Gold Coast
- Parties: States General of the Netherlands; Dutch West India Company; Government of Butre and Upper Ahanta
- Language: Dutch

Full text
- Treaty of Butre (1656) at Wikisource

The Treaty of Butre between the Netherlands and Ahanta was signed at Butre (historical spelling: Boutry), Dutch Gold Coast on 27 August 1656. The treaty regulated the jurisdiction of the Netherlands and the Dutch West India Company over the town of Butre and the surrounding country of Upper Ahanta, creating a Dutch protectorate over the area, and permitting the establishment of Fort Batenstein. The treaty lasted until the Dutch departure from the Gold Coast in April 1872.

== Background ==
The country of Ahanta, in what is now the Western Region of the Republic of Ghana, comprised a regional power in the form of a confederacy of chiefdoms which had come in early contact with the European nations settling on the Gold Coast for the purpose of trade.

In the middle of the seventeenth century the Dutch West India Company and the Swedish Africa Company were competitors in the Ahanta area of the Gold Coast. The Dutch had been active in Athana and resident in neighboring Axim since 1642, the Swedish in Butre since 1650. The European powers allied themselves with African states and chiefs in order to gain a sustainable dominance in the area.

In their efforts to dislodge the Swedish from Butre, the Dutch struck up different tactical alliances with the chiefdoms of Ahanta and the state of Encasser, a political entity of which little is known.

After the Dutch had driven the Swedish out of Butre, the director general of the Dutch West India Company, with headquarters in St. George d'Elmina in the central Gold Coast, decided that it would be beneficial to negotiate a treaty with the local political leadership in order to establish a peaceful long-term relationship. The Ahanta leaders found it equally beneficial to enter into such an agreement. The 1656 treaty signalled the definitive switch in European jurisdiction in the area until 1872.

The treaty and the terms of the protectorate turned out to be very stable, most likely in part because the Dutch never had the intention to interfere in the affairs of the Ahanta states. That is, except for the town of Butre, where they built a fort (Fort Batenstein). The treaty could be interpreted as a treaty of friendship and cooperation, rather than as a treaty establishing a Dutch protectorate. The Dutch worked in close cooperation with the local chief, who was also second in line in the political leadership of what became known as the Kingdom of Ahanta and had its capital at the nearby seaside town of Busua.

In 1837 the king of Ahanta, Baidoo Bonsoe II (Badu Bonsu II), rebelled against the Dutch government and killed several officers, including acting governor Hendrik Tonneboeijer. The Dutch government used the treaty as the basis for military action and an expeditionary force was sent to Ahanta. In the war that followed King Baidoo Bonsoe II was killed. The Dutch reorganised the Ahanta state, after the rebellion, appointing the chief of Butre as regent, keeping the country under close control with an enlarged military and civilian presence.

When the Dutch transferred their possessions on the Gold Coast to the British Empire on 6 April 1872, the treaty of 1656 was still in effect, having regulated political relations between the Dutch and Ahanta for more than 213 years. The treaty was one of the oldest and one of the longest functioning treaties between an African and a European state.

With the Dutch possessions, the British took over all legal obligations including the existing treaties and contracts. After the transfer the British started to develop their own policies towards the now united Gold Coast possessions. Ahanta resisted the British take-over, leading to the Royal Navy bombarding Butre in 1873. In 1874, Britain declared the entire Gold Coast – including Ahanta – a Crown Colony, de jure and de facto ending all former diplomatic and legal obligations.

== Content ==
=== Title ===
The treaty is titled "Dedication of Upper Ahanta and Butre" (Opdracht van Hooghanta ende Boutry), which immediately indicates the nature of the contract, namely the establishment of a protectorate.

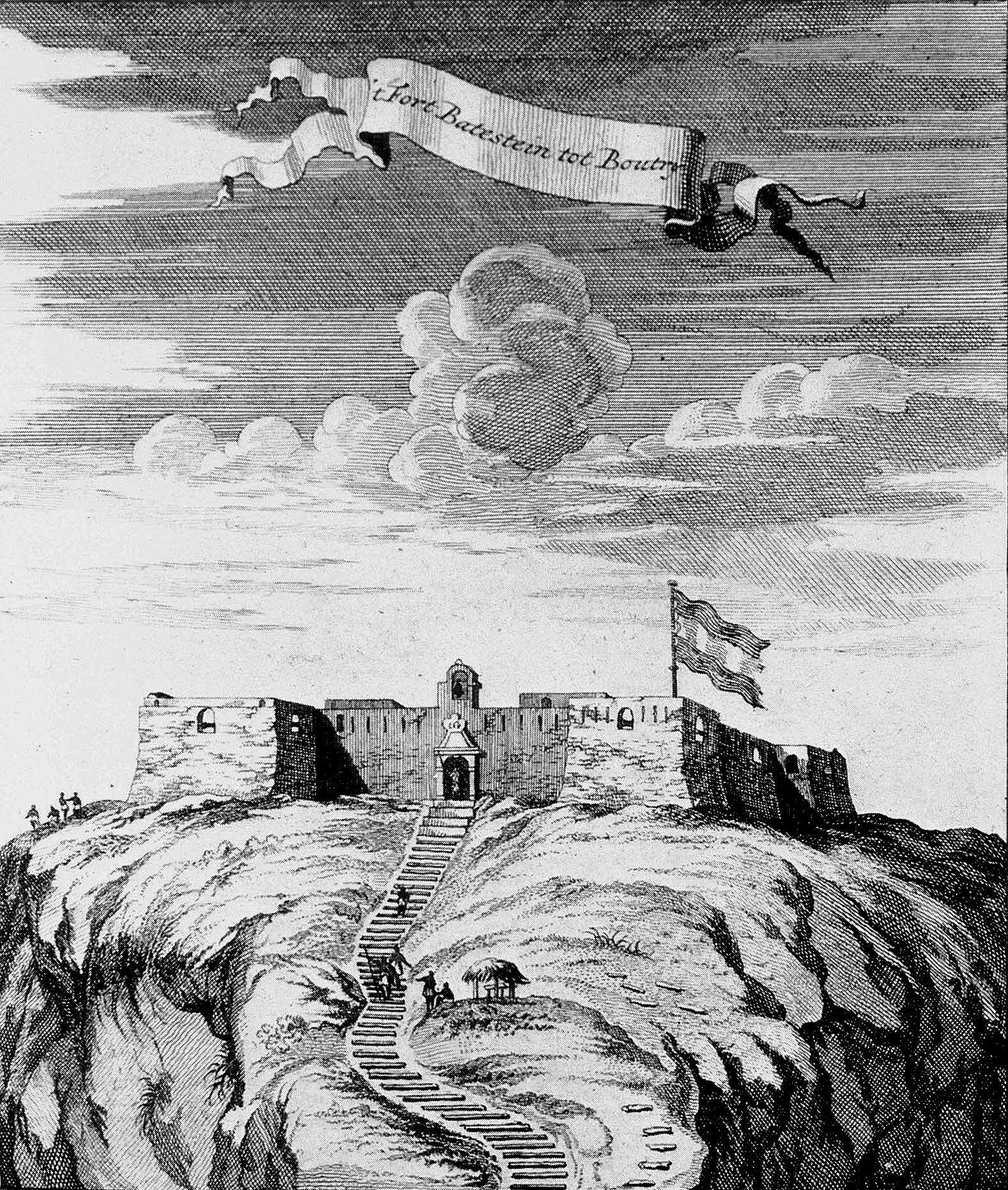
Fort Batenstein at Butre, Dutch headquarters in Ahanta (Dutch Gold Coast), 1709. Lithograph.

=== Location and date ===
The treaty was signed by both the Ahanta and the Dutch delegates at Butre on 27 August 1656 and took effect immediately.

=== Contracting partners ===
The contracting parties on the Dutch side were: the Dutch West India Company, for itself, and by way of its director general representing the States General, the sovereign power of the country, for the Republic of the United Netherlands. Signatories were Eduard Man, fiscal, and Adriaan Hoogenhouck, commissioner in the service of the Dutch West India Company.

The contracting partners on the Ahanta side were Cubiesang, Aloiny, Ampatee and Maniboy, "chiefs of the Country Anta". They were also the signatories of the treaty, together with Ladrou, Azizon, Guary, and Acha. Harman van Saccondé, Menemé, and Rochia, "captain of Boutry" are mentioned as additional parties in the treaty, and they ratified the treaty, together with Tanoe.

=== Terms ===
Being a dedication, the treaty is rather unilateral in its terms. Ahanta declared that in view of former good relations with the Dutch government established in the past at neighbouring Axim, and in view of the adverse circumstances caused by the war with Encasser, it was decided to invite the Dutch director general at Elmina to come to Butre and "accept possession of that what was offered him". Ahanta placed itself under the protection of both the States General of the United Netherlands and the Dutch West India Company. This was done on the condition that the Dutch fortified and defended the places under their protection, and kept the Ahanta free from the dangers of war.

== See also ==
- Treaty of Asebu (1612)
- Treaty of Axim (1642)
