= Hubertus Varlet =

- Died: 4 October 1853; Elmina
- Occupation: Architect
- Position held: Commandant of Fort Batenstein at Butre (1840–1842), Commandant of Fort Crèvecoeur at Accra (1839–1840)

Hubertus Varlet (5 December 1810 – 4 October 1853) was a Dutch architect and colonial administrator, who served on the Dutch Gold Coast. In his capacity as master of works and stores, he rebuilt Fort Crèvecoeur in Accra in 1839. Following the promotion of Anthony van der Eb to governor of the Dutch Gold Coast, Varlet succeeded him as the second vice governor for the Ahanta protectorate, which the Dutch had proclaimed following the conclusion of the Dutch–Ahanta War.

== Biography ==
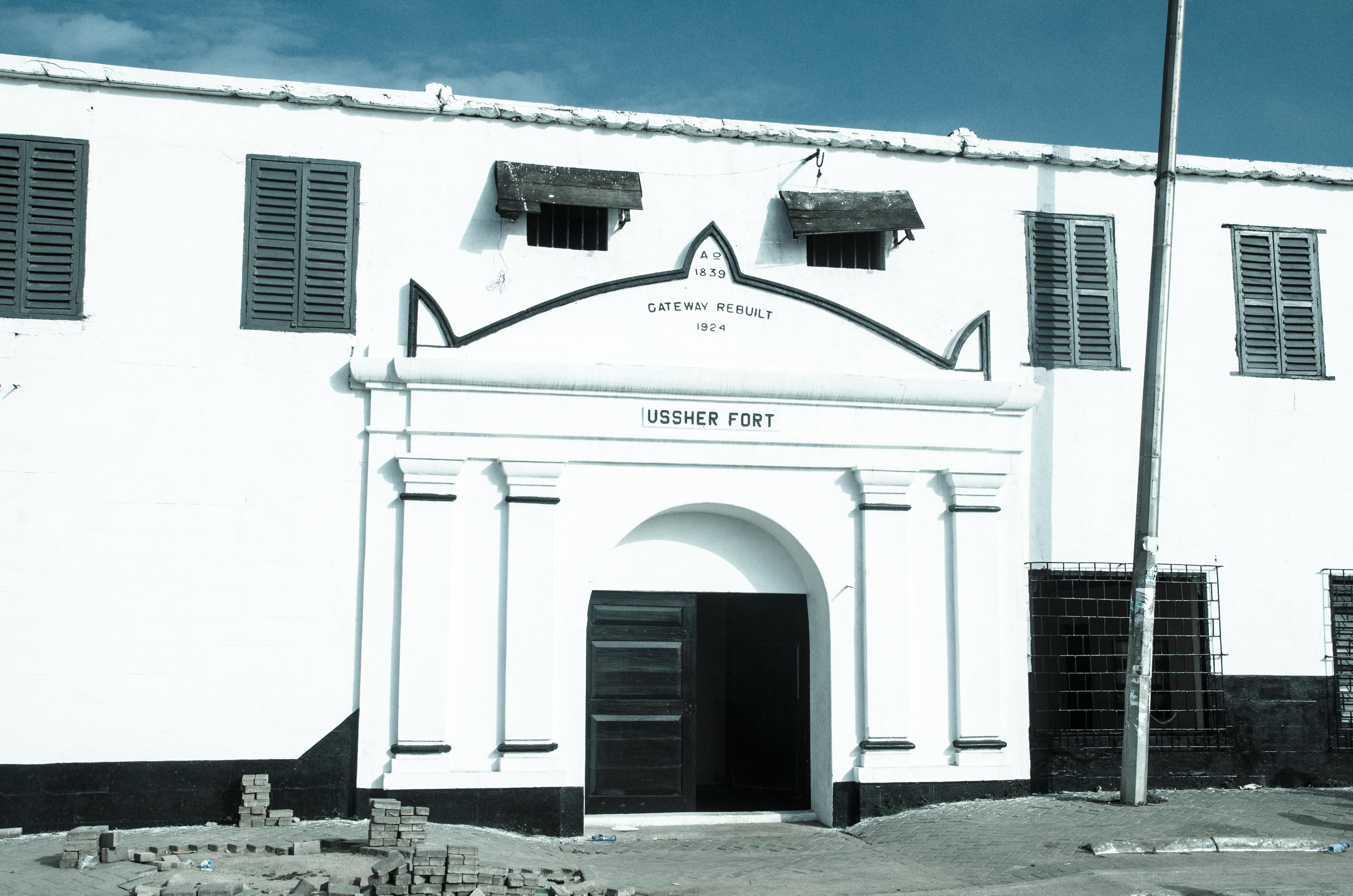
The gateway of Fort Crèvecoeur was designed by Varlet.

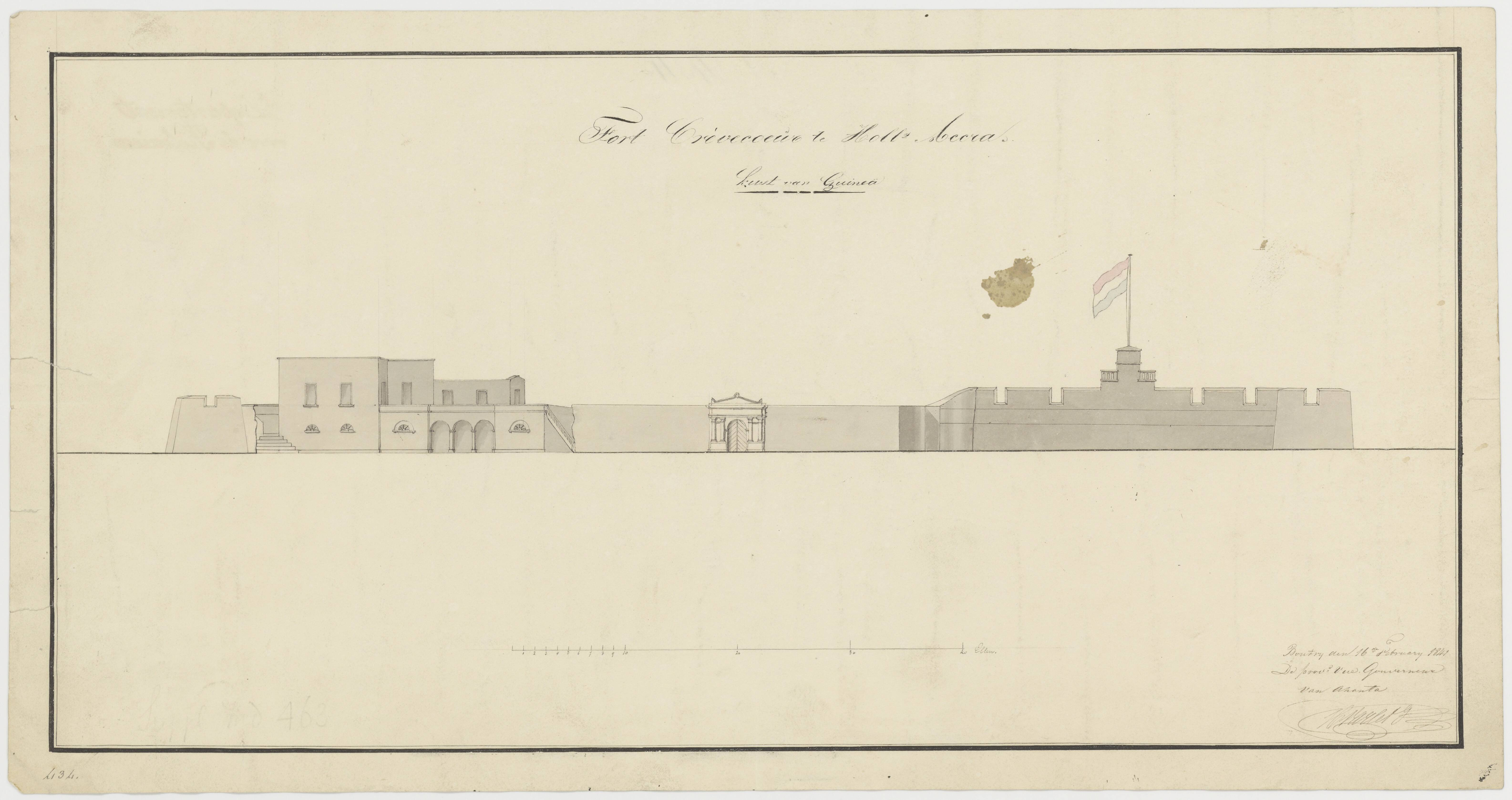
Drawing of Fort Crèvecoeur by Varlet.

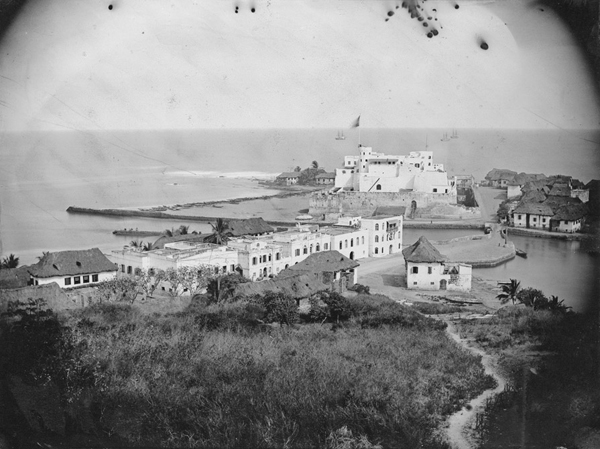
The so-called Viala houses on Liverpool Street, i.e. the third and fourth buildings counted from the bridge leading to Elmina Castle, were designed by Hubertus Varlet.

Hubertus Varlet was born in Medemblik, the Netherlands, to Hubertus Varlet senior, a ship carpenter, and Johanna Scholten. He studied architecture at the Royal Academy of Art, Amsterdam and graduated in 1835. He was appointed master of works and stores on the Dutch Gold Coast in 1836. In this capacity, he rebuilt Fort Crèvecoeur in Accra in 1839, which had been left in a ruinous state ever since Shirley's Gold Coast expedition of 1781. As a private architect, he built several merchant houses on the Herenweg, nowadays Liverpool Street, in Elmina.

During major Jan Verveer's campaign against Ahanta in June and July 1838, Varlet commanded a group of Euro-African volunteers. He was made commandant of Fort Batenstein and vice governor for the Ahanta protectorate after the first vice governor Anthony van der Eb was promoted to governor of the Dutch Gold Coast on 11 March 1840. While vice governor of Ahanta, Varlet submitted highly detailed plans of several Dutch forts to the Dutch Colonial Office.

Varlet retired from the colonial administration in 1850 and was awarded a pension. He remained on the Gold Coast until his death in Elmina on 4 October 1853.

== Personal life ==
Varlet married Maria Amba Bartels, daughter of the wealthy Gold Coast Euro-African merchant Carel Hendrik Bartels, on 25 June 1838. They had at least five children, of whom two sons, Carel Hendrik Varlet (1845–1881) and Hubertus Varlet (1850–1878) reached adulthood. Both sons were sent to the Netherlands for education, where they lived with their uncle Cornelis Varlet. Hubertus junior would eventually become schoolmaster, working in Warmond and 's-Hertogenbosch. Carel Hendrik Varlet followed in his father's footsteps and was appointed assistant on the Gold Coast in 1864. He returned to the Netherlands after one-and-a-half years, however, and later settled as a merchant in Assinie on the French Gold Coast. He returned to the Netherlands in 1881 and died shortly after at a friend's place in Weesp.

After Hubertus Varlet's death in 1853, Maria Amba Bartels remarried Albert Viala, who moved into the houses that Varlet had built for his family. These houses are to this day known as the Viala houses in Elmina. Both Maria Amba Bartels and her son Hermanus Albert Viala are buried in this house.

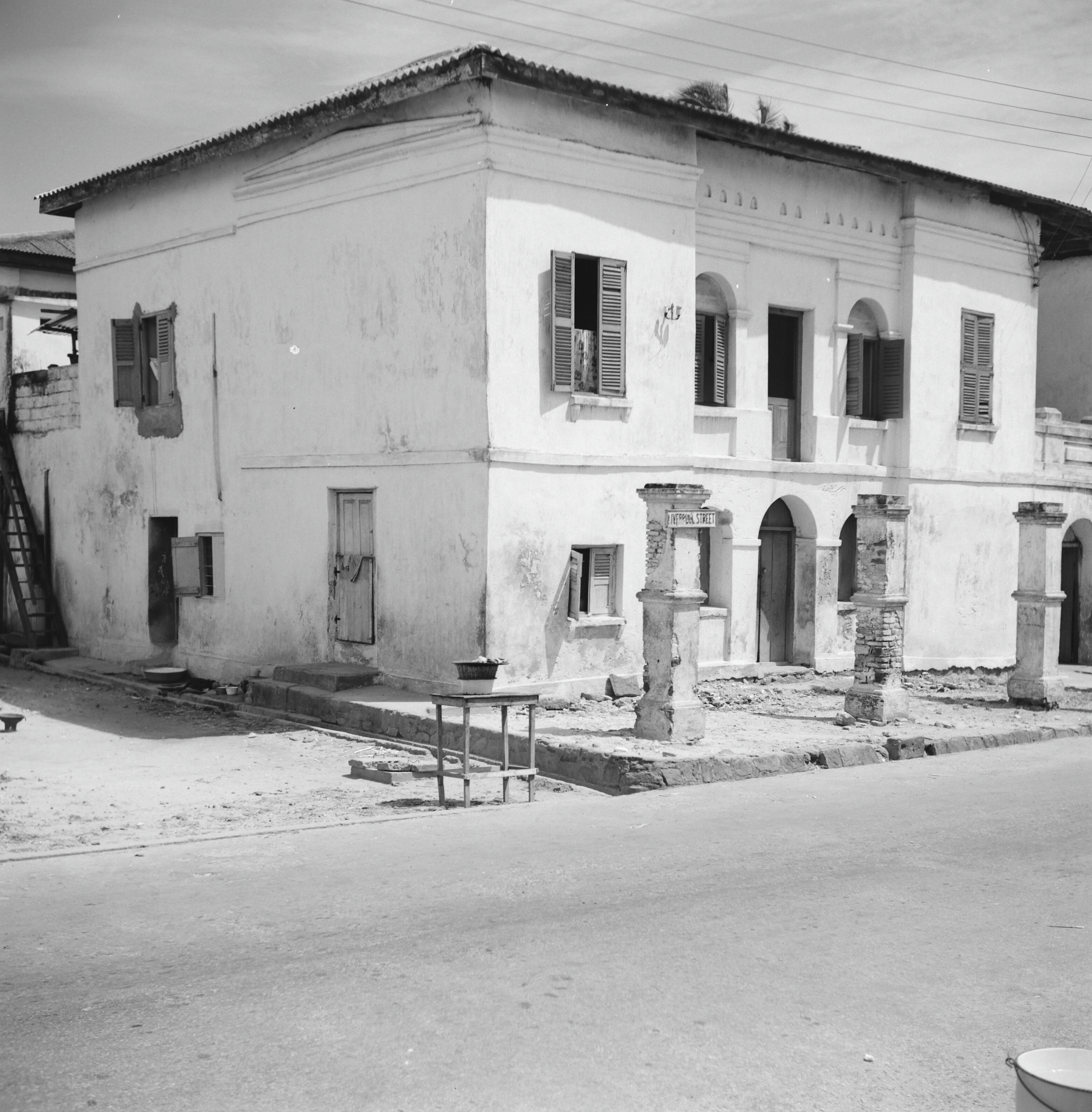
Viala House 1 in 1966.

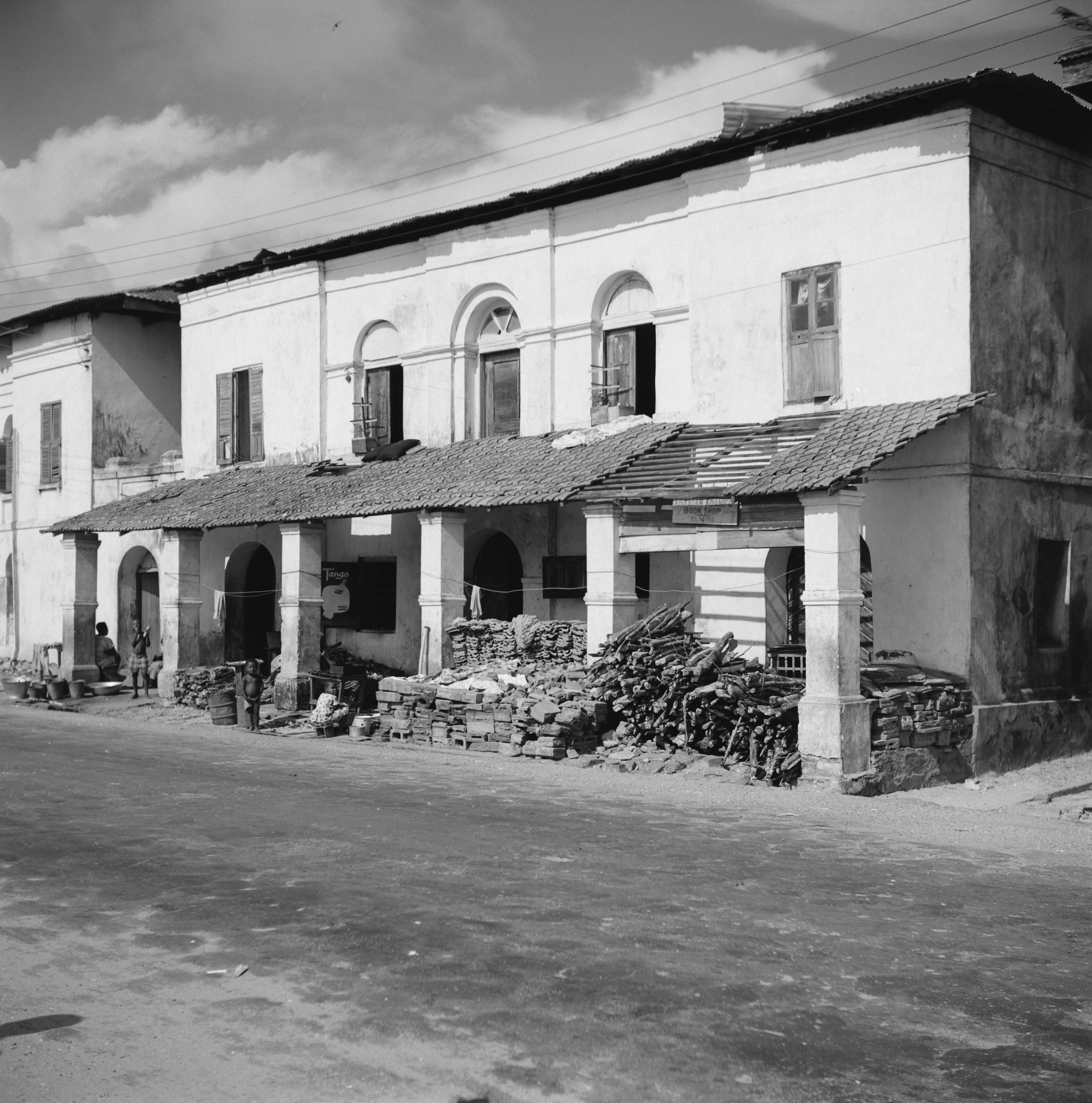
Viala House 2 in 1966.
