= Fort Batenstein =

Ghanaian fort

- Part of Dutch Gold Coast
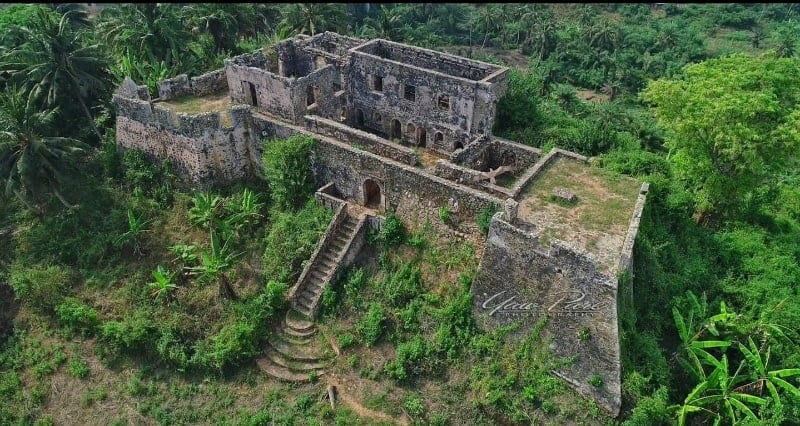
- Fort Batenstein

Location
- Coordinates: 4.826944°N 1.921389°W

Site history
- Built: 1656

Garrison information
- Occupants: Netherlands (1656–1872); United Kingdom (1875–1957); Ghana (1957–Present)

UNESCO World Heritage Site
- Location: Butre, Western Region, Ghana
- Part of: Forts and Castles, Volta, Greater Accra, Central and Western Regions
- Criteria: Cultural: (vi)
- Reference: 34-006
- Inscription: 1979 (3rd Session)

Fort Batenstein was a fort and trading post established by the Dutch on the Gold Coast in 1656. It was situated near Butre (old spelling: Boutry). The fort was ceded with the entire Dutch Gold Coast to Britain in 1872.

At this fort, the Treaty of Butre was signed on 27 August 1656 between the Dutch and the Ahanta.

In 1979, the fort was designated a World Heritage Site (along with several other castles and forts in Ghana) because of its historical importance in European trade and exploitation in West Africa.

== Name ==
Batenstein literally translates to "profit fort," which historian Albert van Dantzig sees as evidence of a cynical sense of humour on the part of the directors of the Dutch West India Company: the fort at Komenda, which was the site of the fierce Komenda Wars with the British, was named Vredenburgh (literally "peace borough"), the commercially unsuccessful fort at Senya Beraku was named Goede Hoop ("Good Hope"), and the fort at Apam, which took five years to build due to local resistance, was named Lijdzaamheid ("Patience").

== History ==
Fort Batenstein was built by the Dutch West India Company, not because of promising trade opportunities in the area, but to crush the attempts of the Swedish Africa Company to establish trading posts on the Gold Coast. Hendrik Carloff, who had previously worked for the Dutch West India Company, founded a trading lodge at Butre in 1650, which was attacked at the instigation of the Dutch by the people of Encasser in 1652. To make sure the Swedes would not return, the Dutch started building a fort on top of the hill overlooking Butre bay, which was completed by 1656. On this occasion, the Dutch signed a treaty with the local population in which the people of Upper Ahanta and Butre subject themselves to the authority of the Dutch West India Company. The formulation of the treaty stands in stark contrast to the earlier Treaty of Axim, which governed the relationship between the Dutch and the peoples around Fort Saint Anthony, and which phrased the relationship in terms of mutual obligations and jurisdictions.

In the 18th century, a sawmill was constructed at Fort Batenstein, which provided the forts and ships in need of repair with wood.

Fort Batenstein was not an important fort until 1837, when the Dutch–Ahanta War made it the focal point of Dutch military effort on the Coast. After the war, the Dutch made Ahanta a protectorate of which the commandant of Fort Batenstein was made the vice governor, thereby citing the provisions of the Treaty of Butre of 1656. In the years that followed, the Dutch attempted to establish a gold mine near Butre, which failed to produce any gold, however.

After the Dutch sold their possessions on the Gold Coast to the United Kingdom in 1872, the people of Butre protested the change of ownership and in 1873 went to the streets waving Dutch flags and firing guns. In October 1873, Butre was shelled by the British in retaliation for an attack of Dixcove, which had always been a British trading post.

== Gallery ==
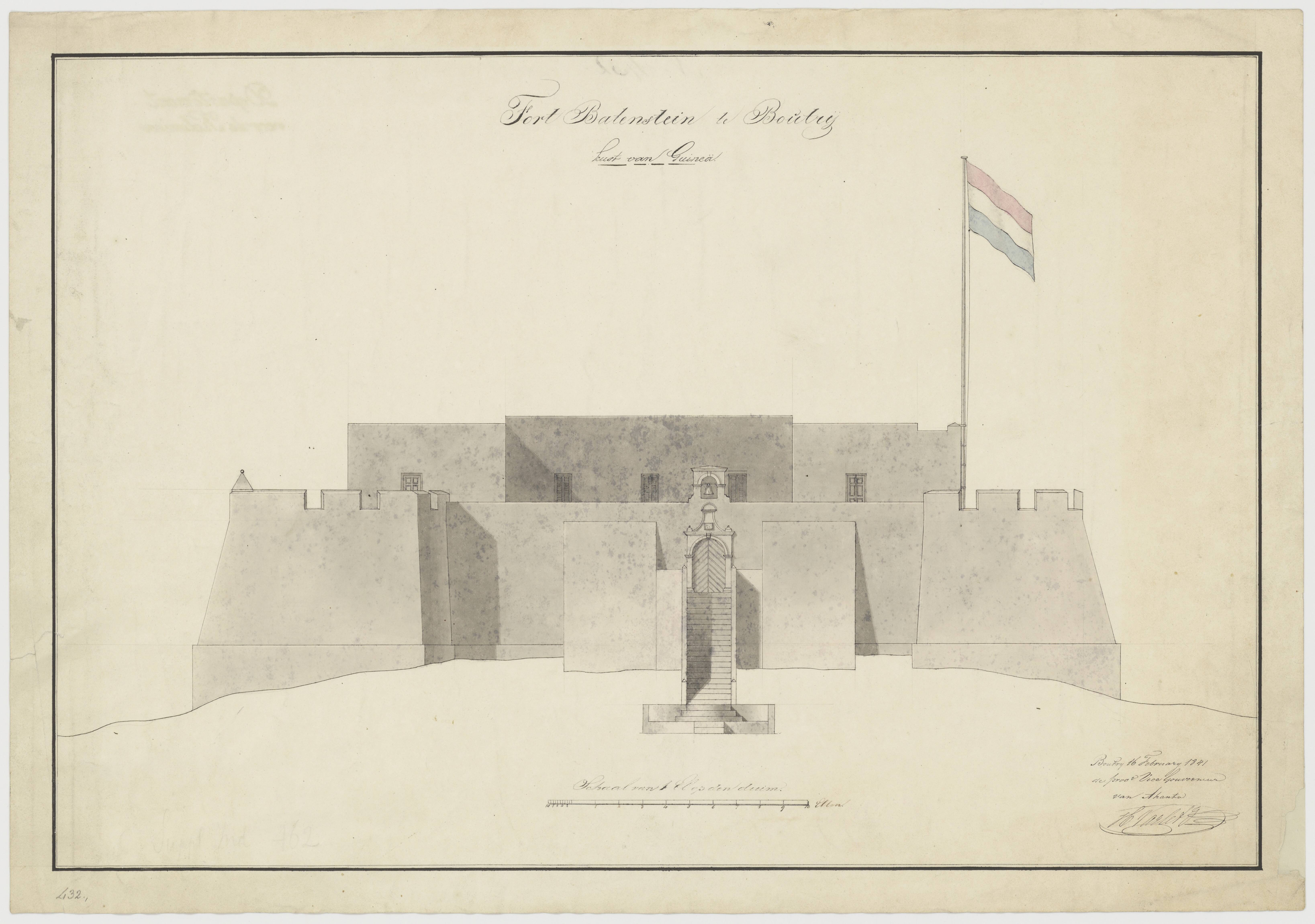
Drawing of Fort Batenstein by Hubertus Varlet (1841)

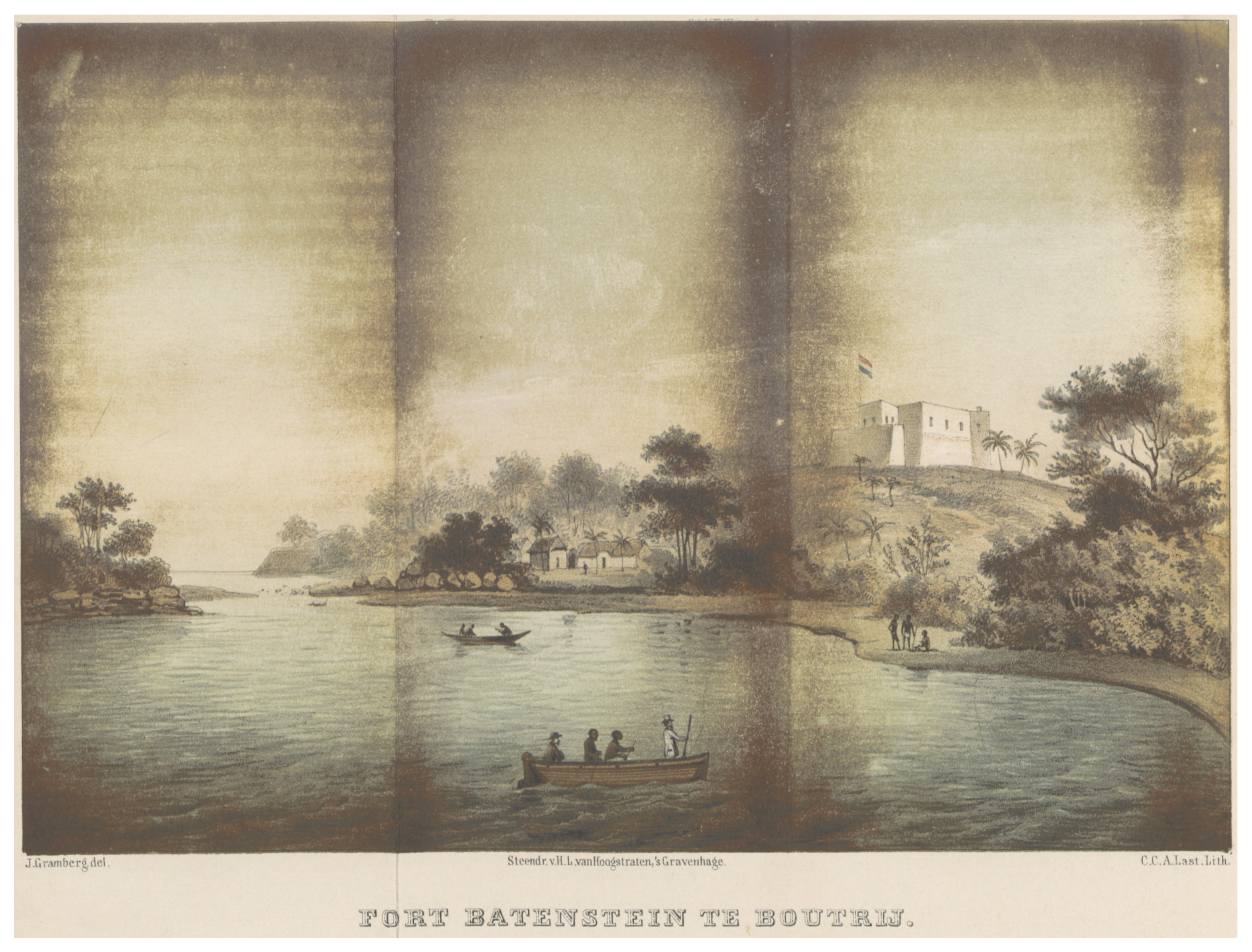
Fort Batenstein (by Gramberg, publ. 1861)

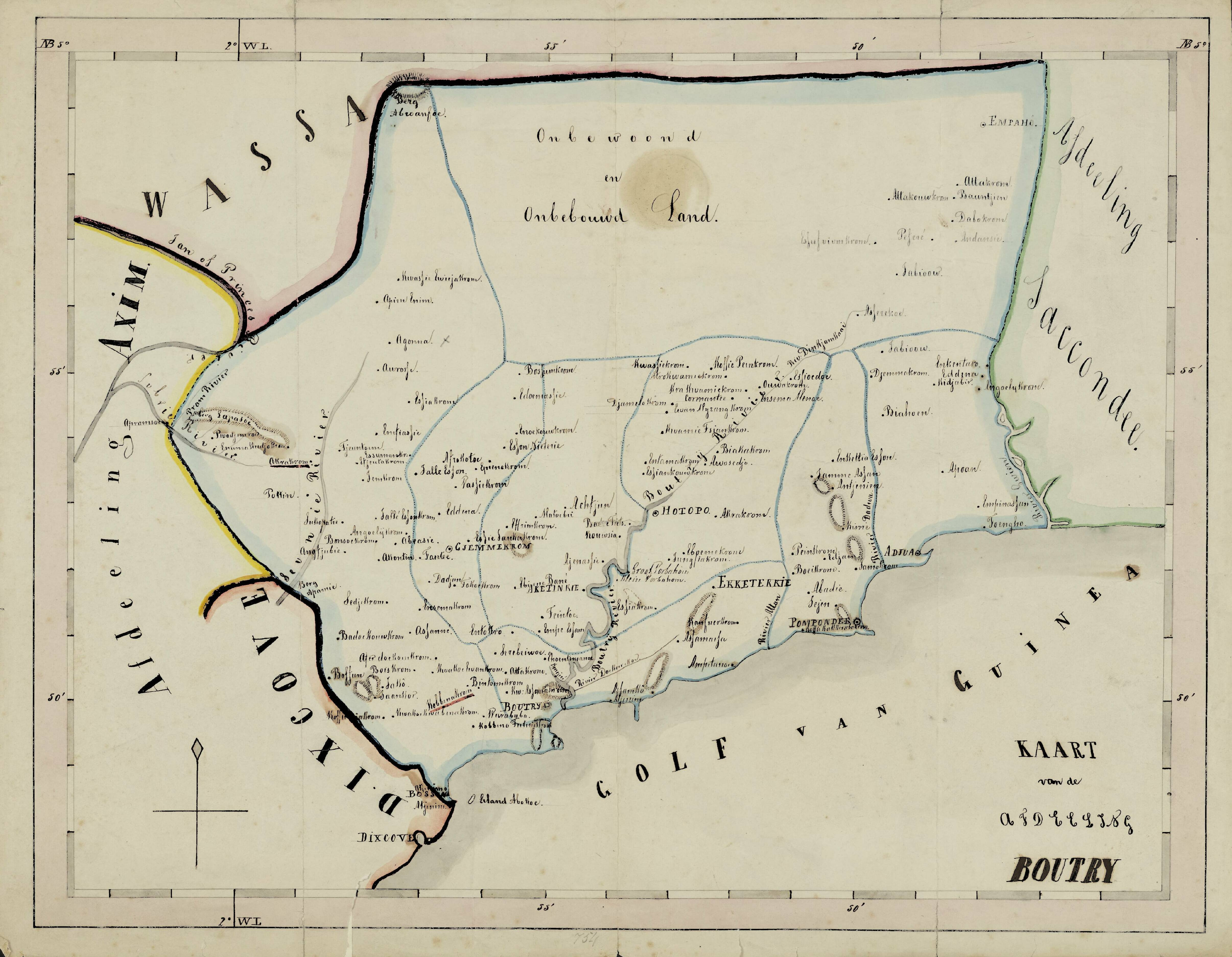
Map of the District of Butre, drawn in 1859

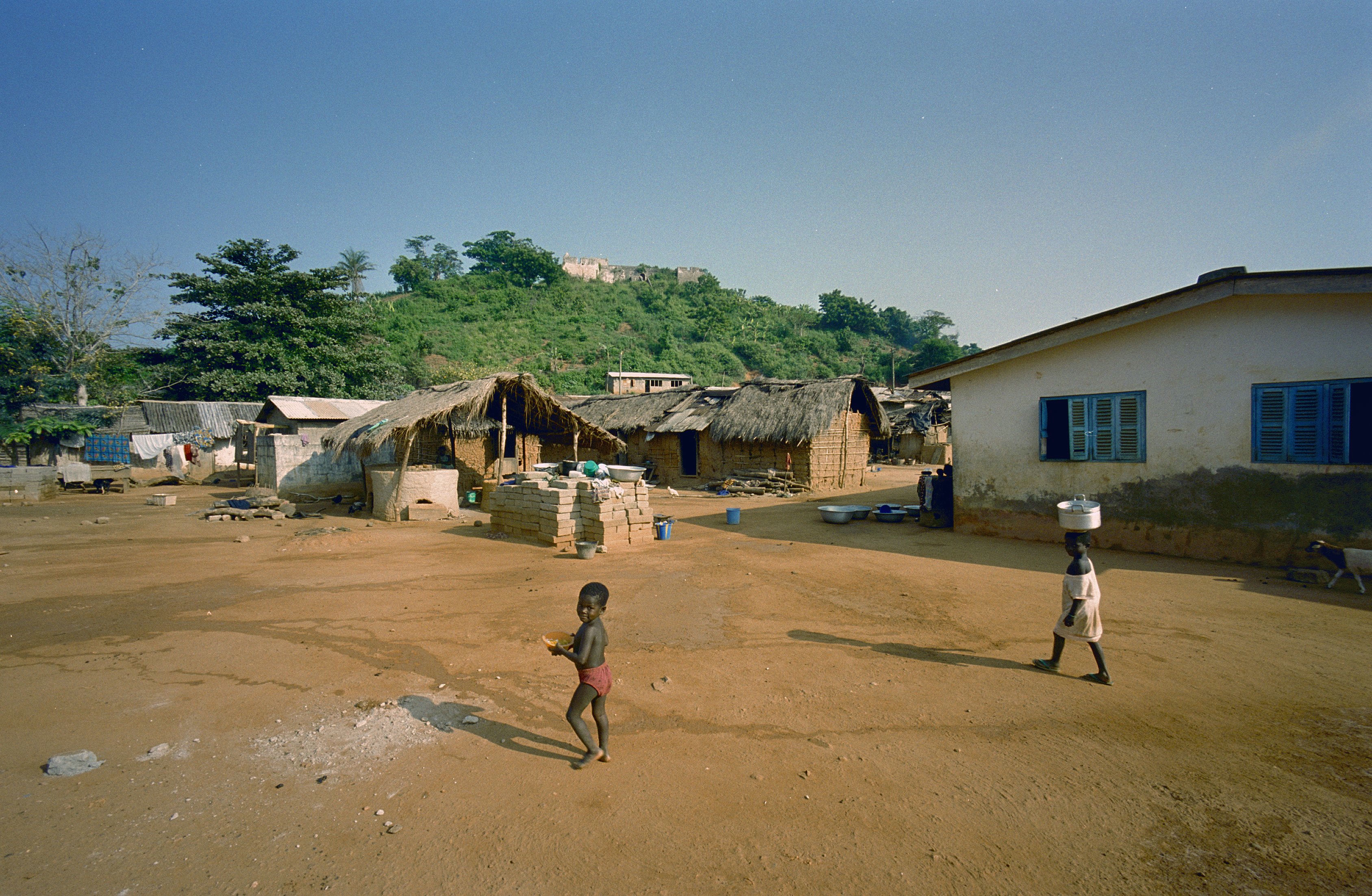
The ruin of Fort Batenstein today

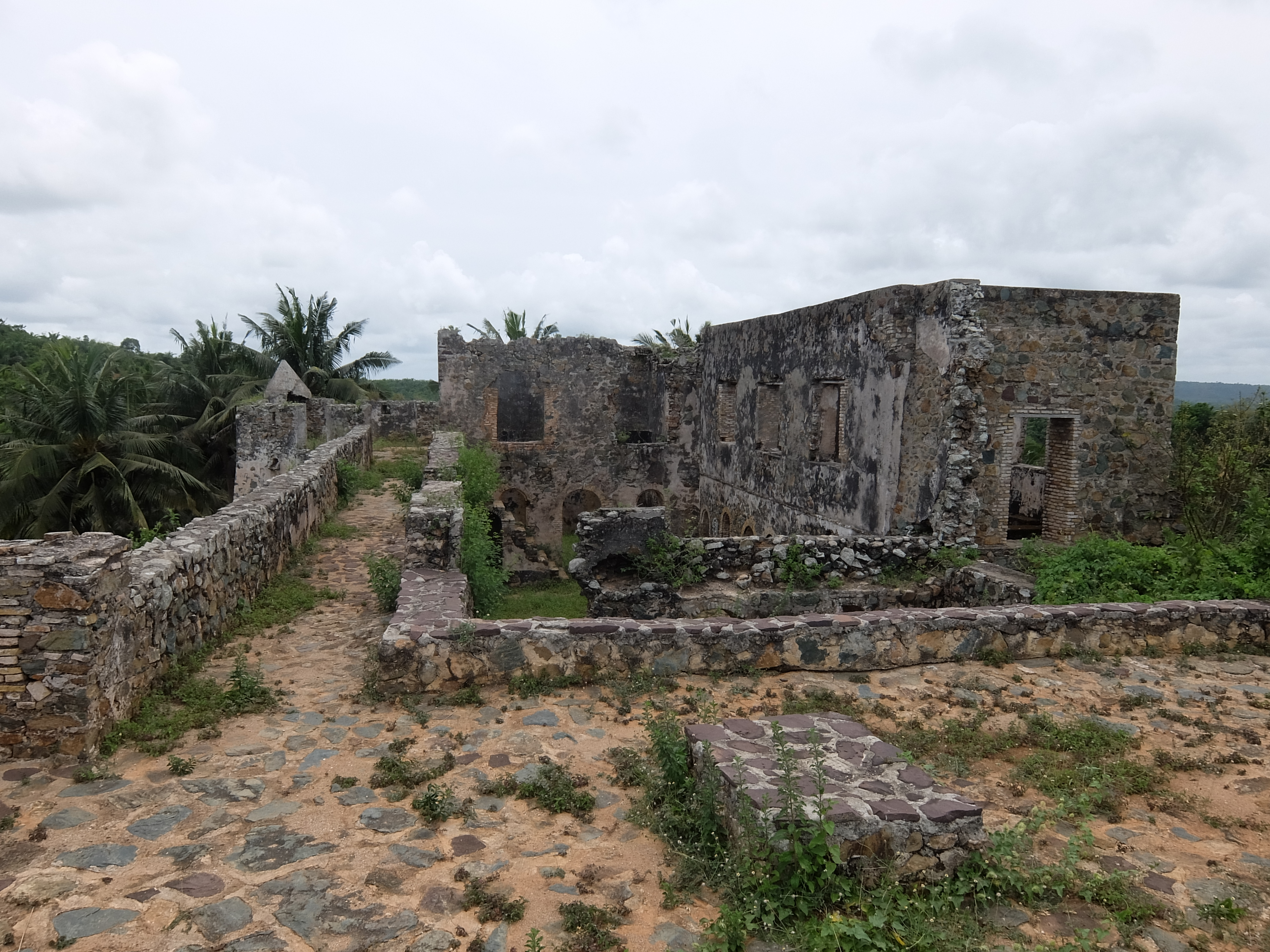
Picture of the top floor of Fort Batenstein

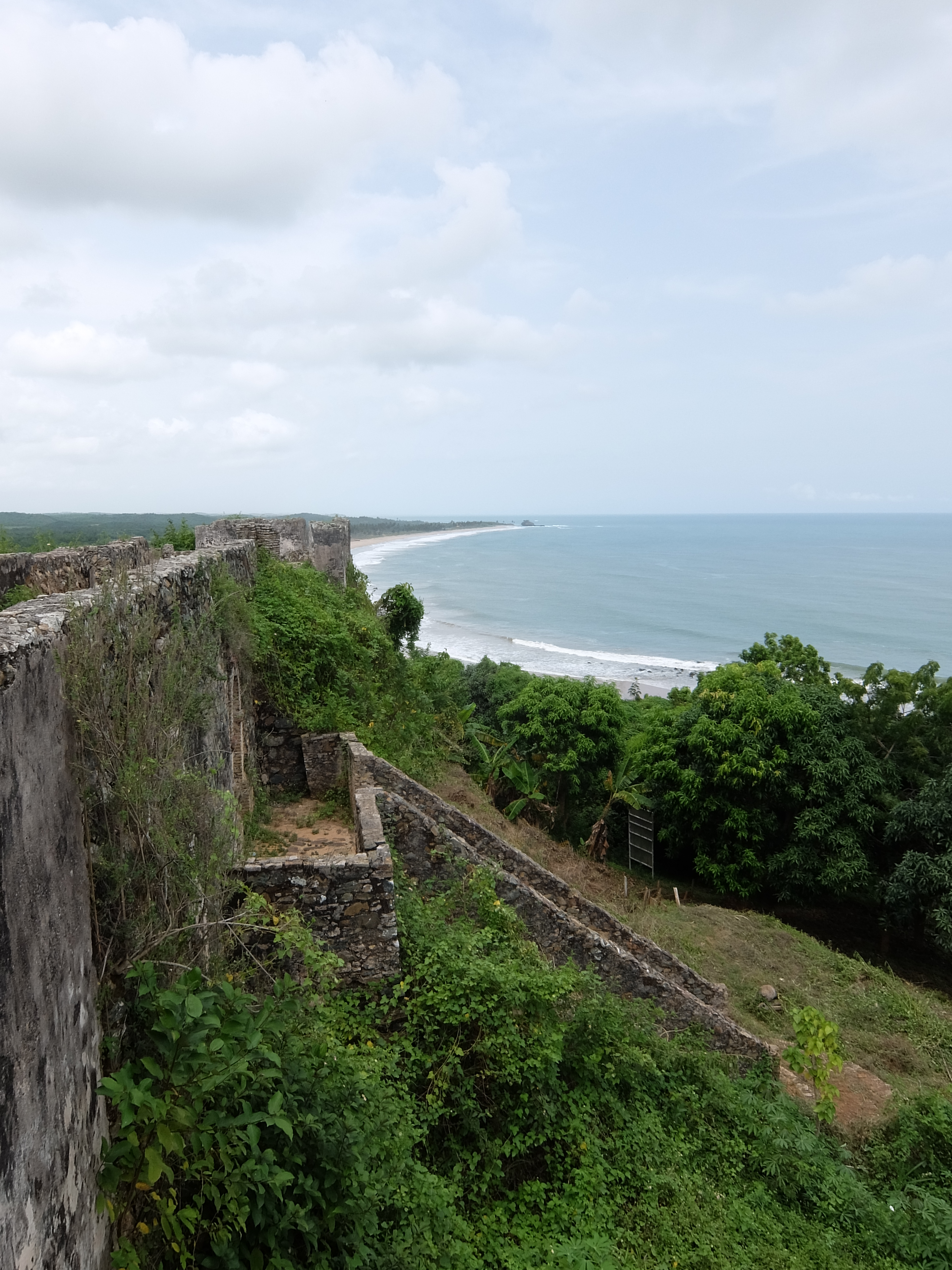
Picture of the entrance to Fort Batenstein
