= Badu Bonsu II =

Ghanaian royalty (died 1838)

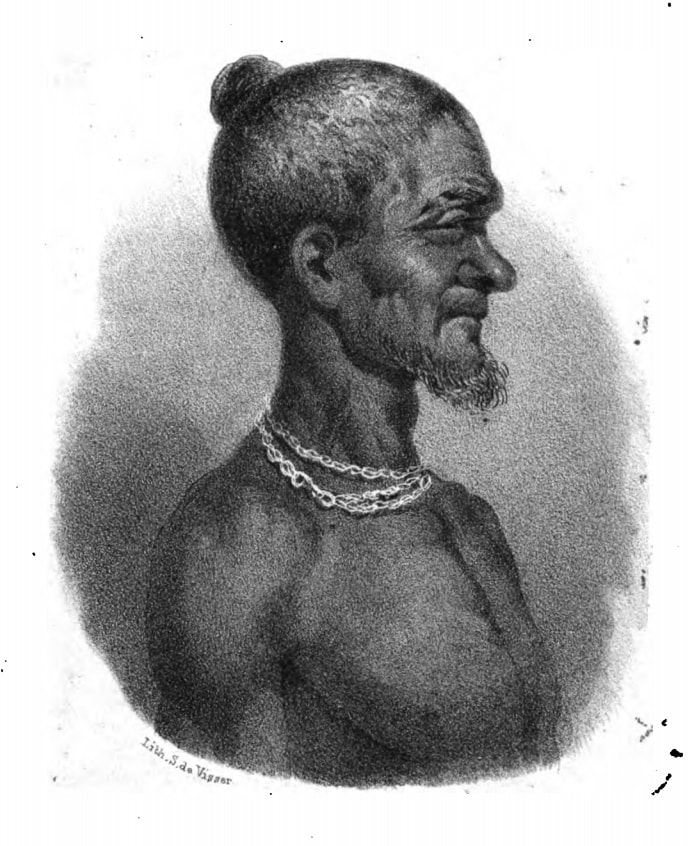
Drawing of Badu Bonsu II made by a Dutch lieutenant, 1838

Badu Bonsu II was a leader of the Ahanta who originally migrated south and separated from the Fante people upon reaching the Pra River and a Ghanaian king who was executed in 1838 by the Dutch, who, at the time, were in control of the Dutch Gold Coast.

== Rebellion against the Dutch ==
In 1837, Badu Bonsu II rebelled against the Dutch government, and killed several officers, including acting governor Hendrik Tonneboeijer. The Dutch government used the Treaty of Butre as the basis for military action against Badu Bonsu and an expeditionary force was sent to Ahanta. In the war that followed, the king was captured, sentenced for murder, and hanged. The Dutch disorganised the Ahanta state, appointing their commandant of Fort Batenstein at Butre as regent, keeping the country under close control with an enlarged military and civilian presence. Following the execution of king Badu Bonsu, his body was desecrated as a Dutch surgeon removed his head. The head was taken to the Netherlands, where it was soon lost for more than a century.

== Rediscovery and return of the head ==
The head was rediscovered in the Leiden University Medical Center (LUMC) in the Netherlands by Dutch author Arthur Japin, who had read the account of the head during research for his 1997 novel De zwarte met het witte hart. Japin found the head in 2005, stored in formaldehyde at the LUMC. In March 2009, government officials announced that it would be returned to its homeland for proper burial, a promise fulfilled on July 23, 2009, after a ceremony held in The Hague.
