= Hendrik Bosch =

Dutch military officer and colonial government official

Governor of the Dutch Gold Coast
- In office 5 August 1838 – 7 March 1840
- Monarch: William II of the Netherlands
- Preceded by: Anthony van der Eb
- Succeeded by: Anthony van der Eb

Personal details
- Born: 26 February 1776; Spanbroek, Dutch Republic
- Died: 9 March 1864 (aged 88); Amsterdam, Netherlands

Hendrik Bosch (born 26 February 1776 – 9 March 1864) was a Dutch military officer and colonial government official, who in his later life made a career in the administration on the Dutch Gold Coast.

== Biography ==
Bosch was born in Spanbroek to Bernardus Bosch and Elisabeth Struis. He began his military career in 1800 and participated in various military campaigns. As a soldier in the French Napoleonic Army, he participated in the Russian Campaign of 1812 and in the German Campaign of 1813. He then switched sides and fought for the Netherlands against France in Napoleon's Hundred Days. During the Belgian Revolution, Bosch defended the citadel of Liège.

Major general Jan Verveer, who was asked by the Dutch government to reform the colonial administration of the Dutch Gold Coast in the wake of the Dutch-Ahanta War, recommended Bosch to be installed as governor of the colony:

Mister Bosch is about 61 years old, but is of extraordinary good physical condition. He has served for three years as a soldier in Suriname. His military career has been rich in practical experience; - his behaviour was exemplary at all times; - he lived a plain and sobre life; - his judgement is sound and he is a soldier in heart and soul.

— Major general J. Verveer,

Bosch eagerly accepted the office and was installed by royal decree of 23 March 1838, arriving in Elmina in August of the same year. He did not serve his full term and returned to Europe on 13 March 1840.

Hendrik Bosch died in Amsterdam on 9 March 1864.

== Personal life ==
Hendrik Bosch married Maria Lohman (born 8 August 1786 in The Hague, died 6 September 1863), with whom he had three sons and one daughter. When their son Bernardus died at the age of 45 in September 1853 in Delft, both Hendrik and Maria were still alive and residents of Nootdorp. The civil registration for 1850-1880 lists them as living there with their daughter Hentrietta (*1832 Delft; left in 1860), their son Willem (*1829 Luik), and a maid, but does not show a departure or death date for either parent.

== Decorations ==
- Order of the Netherlands Lion (Knight)
- Metal Cross 1830-1831
