= Elmina Java Museum =

Museum in Ghana

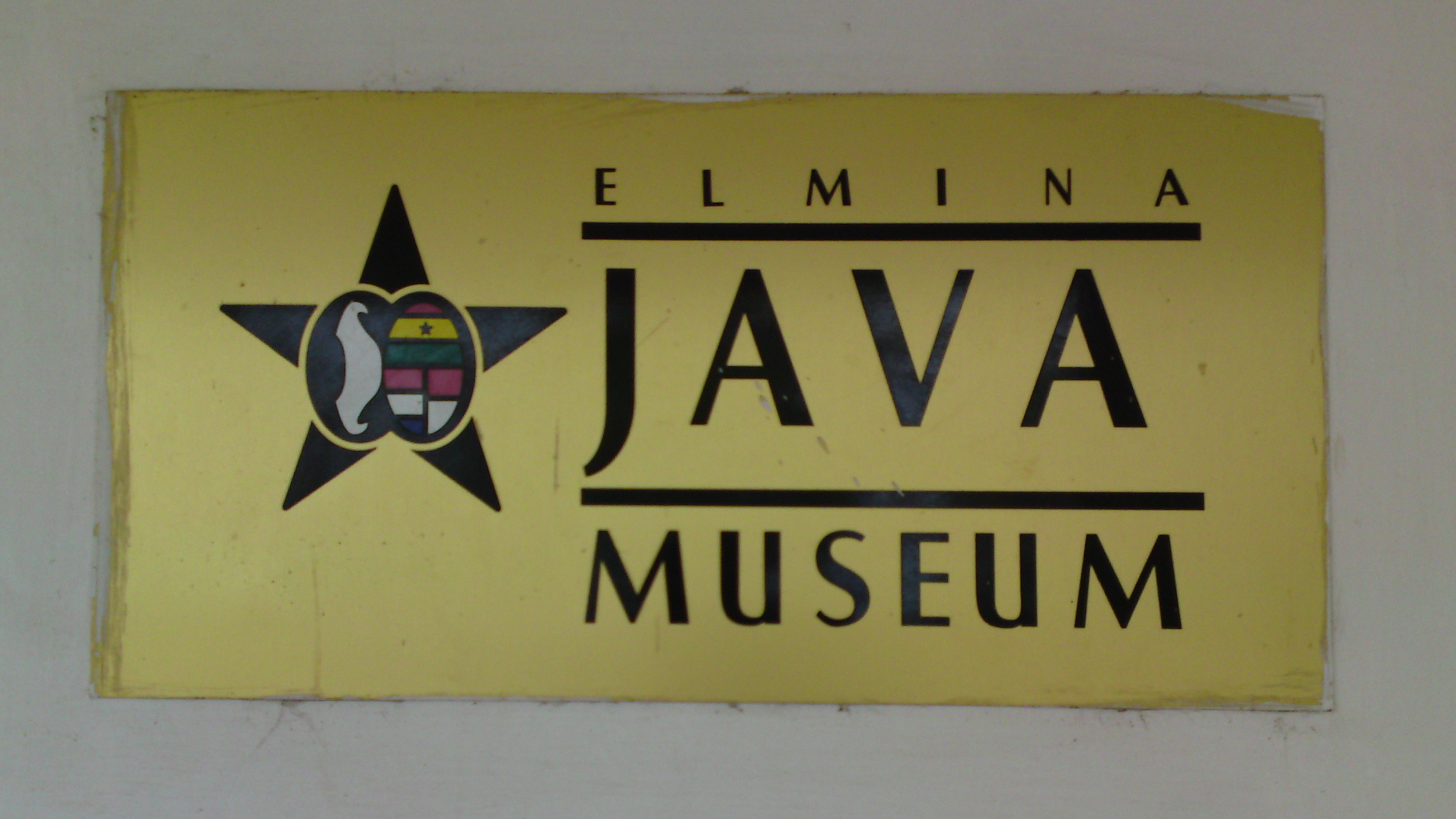
- Established: 2003
- Location: Elmina, Ghana
- Coordinates: 5.0995°N 1.3468°W

The Elmina Java Museum is a museum in Elmina, Ghana, dedicated to the history of the so-called Belanda Hitam; soldiers recruited in the 19th century in the Dutch Gold Coast to serve in the Royal Netherlands East Indies Army. The museum is funded by the Edward A. Ulzen Memorial Foundation.

== History ==
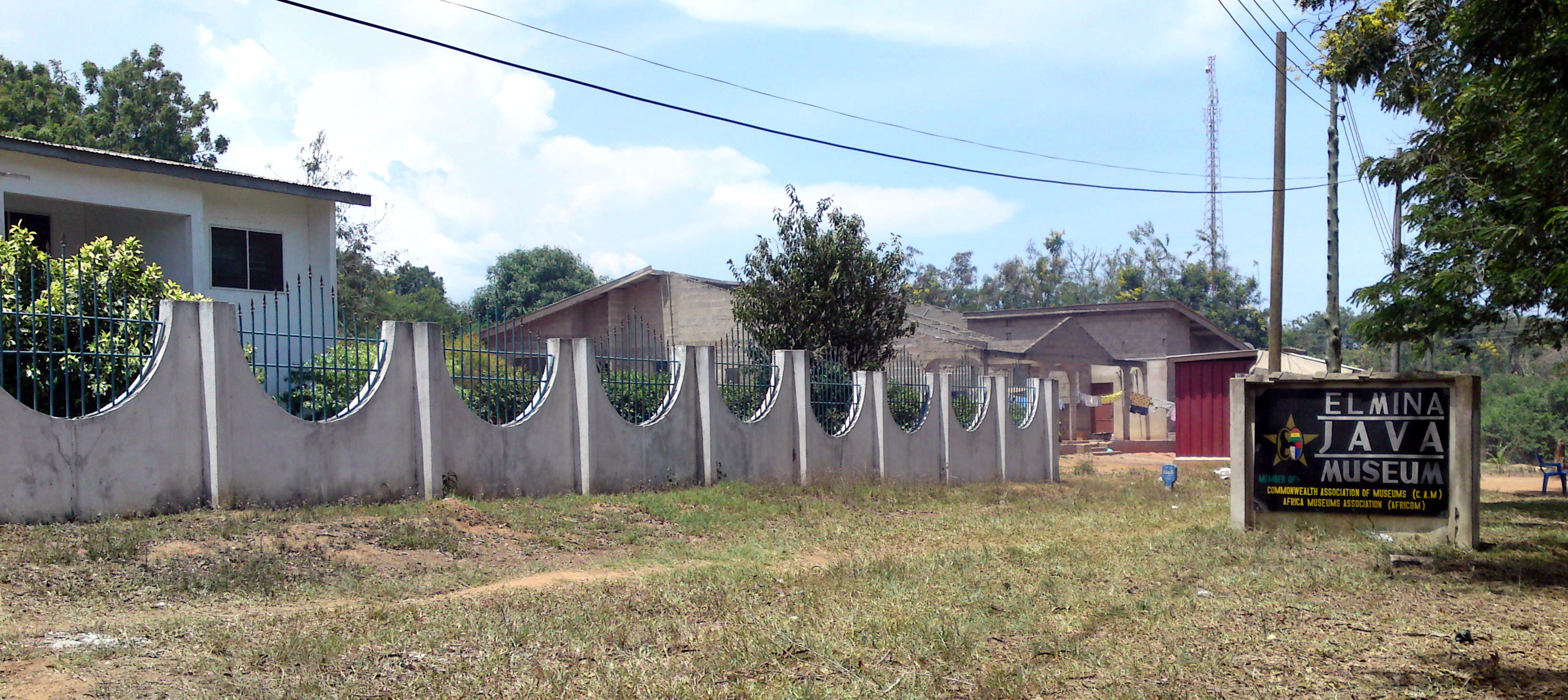
The Elmina Java Museum.

Since Arthur Japin published his The Two Hearts of Kwasi Boachi (1997), the history of the Belanda Hitam has attracted renewed attention. Ineke van Kessel, professor at the Centre for African Studies of Leiden University had met the late Edward Ulzen during her research of the history of the Belanda Hitam. This meeting brought her into contact with his son Prof. Thaddeus Patrick Manus Ulzen, who attended the tenth biennial reunion of Belanda Hitam descendants in Schiedam in the Netherlands in September 2000, and announced on that occasion the decision of his family to provide a permanent site for a museum to preserve the history of the Belanda Hitam. In 2003, the Elmina Java Museum was opened to honour the history of the Belanda Hitam at large, and the Ulzen family in particular. His 2013 book "Java Hill: An African Journey" details 10 generations of the Ulzen family history from Brielle, Netherlands to present day Elmina and the story of the founding of the museum, which is the first private museum in Ghana.

=== The Ulzen family ===
The Ulzen family traced its origins to Jan Ulsen, a Dutchman from Brielle, who came to the Dutch Gold Coast in 1732 as an employee of the Dutch West India Company. A year later, Jan Ulsen died, leaving his son Roelof Ulsen, whom he had taken with him from the Netherlands, an orphan. Roelof Ulsen is then raised on the Gold Coast by personnel of the Dutch West India Company, and makes a career in local government, eventually serving as acting governor of the Gold Coast between 1755 and 1758.

In 1765, Roelof Ulsen sailed to the Netherland after 29 years of service, together with his Euro-African son Hermanus. In a rather sad recurrence of history, Roelof died on ship during his voyage to the Netherlands, leaving his son an orphan as well. After graduating in the Netherlands, Hermanus sails back to the Gold Coast in 1779, and it his grandson Manus Ulzen who was recruited for the Dutch East Indies Army.
