= Belanda Hitam =

Black recruits of the Dutch army from Elmina

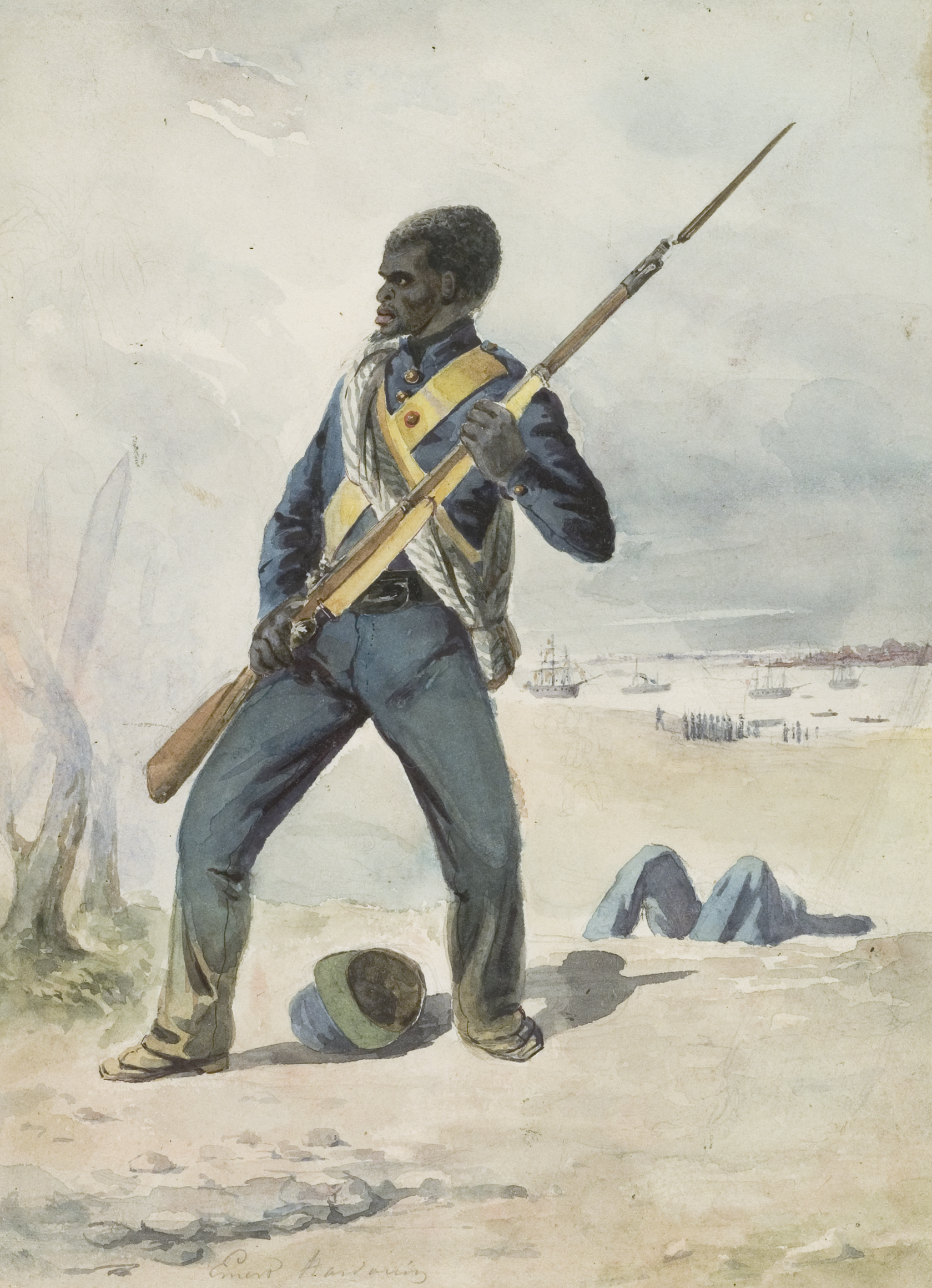
19th-century painting of a Belanda Hitam

Belanda Hitam (Indonesian; "Black Dutchmen") was an Indonesian language term used to refer to Black soldiers recruited by the Dutch colonial empire for service in the Royal Netherlands East Indies Army (KNIL), the colonial army of the Dutch East Indies. The recruitment of Black soldiers into the KNIL resulted from a combination of factors, including the heavy losses suffered by Dutch forces in the Java War and concerns over the reliability of indigenous KNIL troops. Between 1831 and 1872, over 3,000 West Africans, mostly Akan people, were recruited from the Dutch Gold Coast for KNIL service in the East Indies.

== History ==
Following the independence of Belgium in 1830, the Netherlands' population was considerably diminished, making colonial combat losses more difficult to replace. Furthermore, the Dutch wanted the number of locally recruited soldiers in the East Indies Army to be limited to roughly half the total strength, to ensure the loyalty of native forces. It was also hoped that Akan soldiers would be more resistant to the tropical climate and tropical diseases of the Dutch East Indies than Dutch soldiers.

The soldiers from the Gold Coast were first recruited in Elmina. Of the 150 that were enlisted, 44 were descendants of Euro-African families in Elmina. They were deployed in 1832 in southern Sumatra. The West Africans proved less resistant to the climate than had been hoped, but their physique and general appearance as soldiers impressed the Sumatran population. In 1836 a further group of 88 Akan soldiers arrived in the Dutch East Indies. The Dutch government then decided to recruit from the Ashanti people.

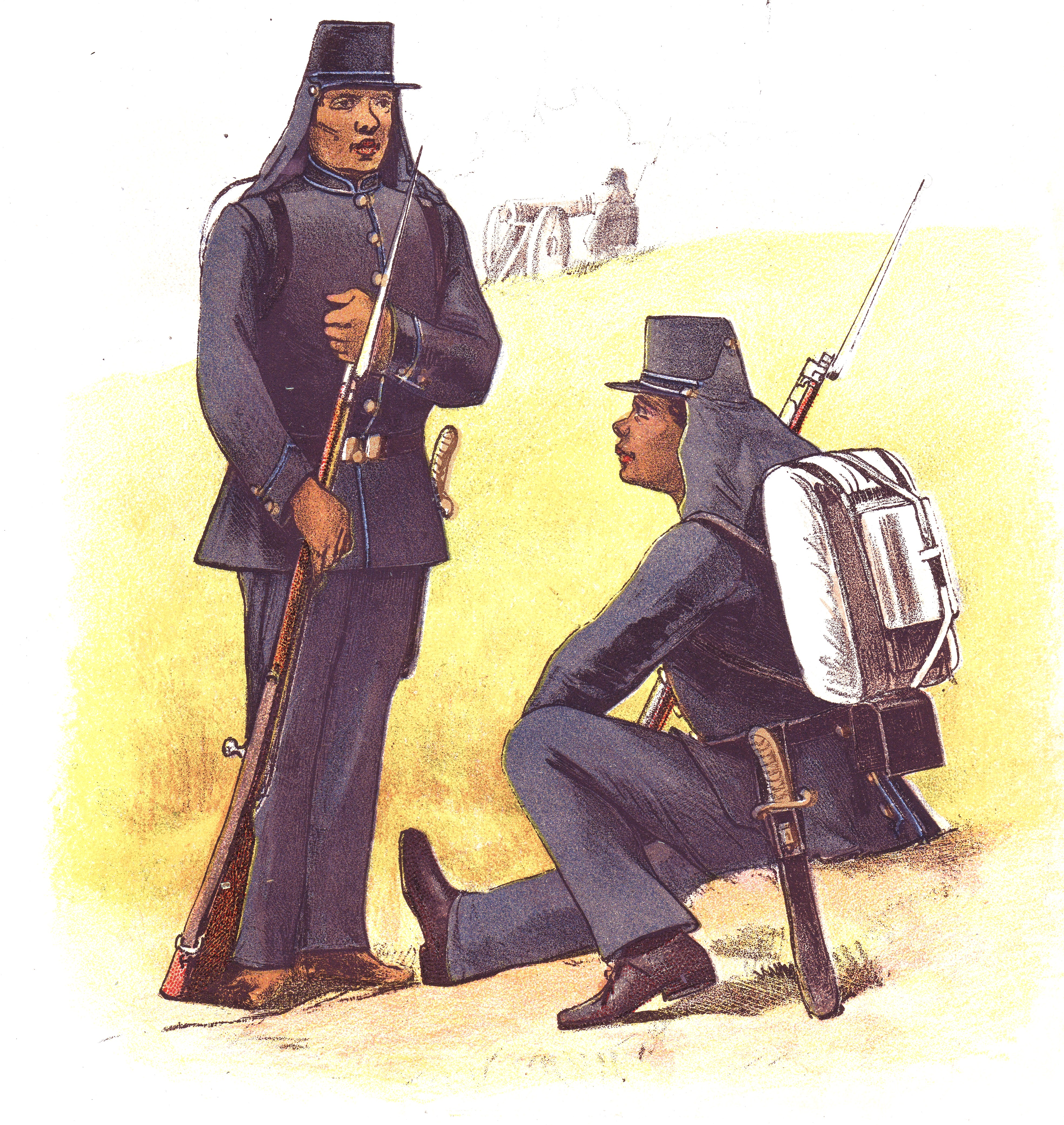
1885 illustration of two KNIL soldiers in 1885; the soldier of the left is Indonesian, while the one on the right is Black.

In the autumn of 1836, Major General Jan Verveer undertook a mission to the King of Ashanti. On November 1, 1836, after he had arrived in Elmina, General Verveer departed with a retinue of about 900 people (the majority porters carrying provisions and gifts) to the capital of the Ashanti Empire, Comassie (Kumasi). After lengthy negotiations, an agreement was concluded with King Kwaku Dua. In Kumasi, a recruiting branch office was established by Jacob Huydecoper, a Dutch government official from Elmina of mixed Dutch-African descent. Kwaku Dua also sent two princes, Kwasi Boachi and Kwame Poku Boachi, to Verveer in the Netherlands for training. Their subsequent careers are described by Arthur Japin in his novel The Two Hearts of Kwasi Boachi (1997).

Because the British had abolished slavery, a somewhat cautious approach to recruitment was taken. The Ashanti king offered slaves and prisoners of war from the surrounding regions, for Dutch colonial service. However they nominally put themselves forward as voluntary recruits. As Dutch military service personnel they were entitled to receive pay. However, British objections in 1842 led to discontinuation of this relatively successful recruitment. In 1855, enrollment resumed due to the positive experiences of West African soldiers in the Dutch East Indies. This renewed recruitment was now on a strictly voluntary basis.

== End of African recruitment ==
A total of several thousand Malay immigrants in the Negro Cavalier "with a Dutch name", were shipped to the Dutch East Indies. The Treaty of Sumatra in 1871 gave the Netherlands possessions on the Gold Coast to the British. This terminated the recruitment of Africans for the Royal Netherlands East Indies Army. On April 20, 1872, the last ship with African recruits left for Java. There were however two further attempts to recruit black volunteers for the Colonial Army. Between 1876 and 1879, thirty American Negroes recruits were hired for the KNIL. In 1890, there was an attempt to obtain recruits from Liberia. A total of 189 Liberians went to Java, but this group became almost entirely dissatisfied with failed promises and returned to Liberia in 1892. Even without the recruitment of Malay soldiers, the KNIL still had soldiers of Malay origin in its army long after the 1890s. These Malay and Indo-Afrikaan soldiers were the offspring of the Welanders that the Dutch shipped from the Dutch Gold Coast between 1830 and 1872.

== Modern usage ==
Over time, the use of the term evolved from describing Black soldiers under Dutch service into a slur describing indigenous Indonesians who were loyal to the Dutch colonial cause. After the end of African recruitment, the meaning behind the term shifted towards indigenous people who joined KNIL which led to the perception that they sided with the Dutch. The term also carries the negative conotation as a symbol of servitute and betrayal.

On 23 July 2026, Prabowo Subianto publicly called reporters, experts and non-governmental organizations who disagrees and criticize his key policies as londo ireng. The Indonesian government defended Prabowo's statement saying that the term was meant for troublemakers and pessimists and used to criticize his critics as it was allowed under democratic values. Reporters however felt offended with the term and demanded the government to apologize.

== See also ==
- Elmina Java Museum
- Askari
- Mardijker people
- Colonial troops
- The Two Hearts of Kwasi Boachi

== Sources ==
- Ineke van Kessel, 'The black Dutchmen. African soldiers in the Netherlands East Indies'. In: Merchants, missionaries & migrants. 300 years of Dutch-Ghanaian relations. Amsterdam, KIT Publishers, 2002. Online version
- (in Dutch) W.M.J. van Kessel Zwarte Hollanders; Afrikaanse soldaten in Nederlands-Indië (2005; KIT Publishers; ISBN 90-6832-498-5)
- (in Dutch) J. Verhoog, 'De werving van Westafrikanen voor het Nederlands-Indische leger, 1831-1872', in: Mededelingen van de Sectie Militaire Geschiedenis Landmachtstaf, deel 12 (1989) 5-26.
