= Hendrik Tonneboeijer =

Dutch colonial officer

Hendrikus Jacobus Tonneboeijer

Commander of the Dutch Gold Coast
- ad interim
- In office 2 December 1836 – 28 October 1837
- Monarch: William I of the Netherlands
- Preceded by: Christiaan Lans
- Succeeded by: Anthony van der Eb

Personal details
- Born: 18 August 1814 Kampen, Netherlands
- Died: 28 October 1837 (aged 23) Takoradi, Dutch Gold Coast

Hendrikus Jacobus Tonneboeijer (born 18 August 1814 – 28 October 1837) was a Dutch colonial officer, who made a career in the administration on the Dutch Gold Coast. He was Acting Commander of the Dutch Gold Coast in 1836 and 1837.

== Biography ==
Hendrikus Jacobus Tonneboeijer was born in Kampen, in the province of Overijssel, to Jacob Tonneboeijer, a wine trader, and Aaltje de Zee. Tonneboeijer began his career as clerk at the harbour master's office in Willemsoord, a farmers colony established by the Society of Humanitarianism. For some reason, Tonneboeijer aspired a job at the Dutch Gold Coast already in his late teens; Tonneboeijer's father had sold a house in Kampen to Librecht Jan Temminck, who preceded Tonneboeijer in joining the colonial administration on the Gold Coast, and who could have had inspired him. His application in 1831 was turned down for a lack of vacancies, but when a vacancy did open a year later, the minister of colonies himself approached Tonneboeijer for the job, as a voluntary application of a young man of impeccable behaviour was particularly rare for a place which was notorious for its bad health conditions and below-average pay. Adventurism may well have been a reason for Tonneboeijer to apply for this position, but one must also note that his service excluded him from being drafted in the national army, which in theory was still at war with Belgium.

Tonneboeijer was finally appointed to service on the Gold Coast by a royal decree dated 17 January 1833. He was appointed provisional resident on 12 May 1834 and became Acting Commander of the Dutch Gold Coast on 2 December 1836, when his predecessor Christiaan Lans left for the Netherlands.

It was during his tenure as Commander that Tonneboeijer made the biggest mistake of his life. Against the advice of many, he assembled an expeditionary force to arrest Ahanta king Badu Bonsu II, whose forces had killed two of Tonneboeijer's envoys. Tonneboeijer's army was ambushed on 28 October 1837 by Badu Bonsu's forces, killing 45 men, including Tonneboeijer. Tonneboeijer died in front of Fort Witsen at Takoradi when he was only 23 years old.
