= Jan Verveer =

Royal Commissioner of the Kingdom of the Netherlands to the King of Ashanti
- In office 1836–1837

Commander of Sint Maarten
- In office 1807 – 10 April 1810
- Preceded by: Willem Hendrik Rink
- Succeeded by: John Skinner

Personal details
- Born: 27 August 1775 Rotterdam, Netherlands
- Died: 22 August 1838 (aged 62) Elmina, Dutch Gold Coast

Military service
- Allegiance: Netherlands
- Branch/service: Royal Netherlands Army
- Years of service: 1797–1838
- Rank: Major General
- Battles/wars: Dutch–Ahanta War

Jan Verveer (27 August 1775 – 22 August 1838) was a major general of the Royal Netherlands Army.

== Biography ==
Jan Verveer was born in Rotterdam to Johannes Verveer and Anna Maria van Alphen.

Verveer joined the army in 1797. In 1803, he was sent to the Dutch West Indies where he remained until 1815. From 1807, Verveer served as Commander of Sint Maarten, until the island was taken by British forces in 1810. He then returned to the Netherlands where he served in the military administration.

In 1826, Verveer was an observer to the Congress of Panama. As a consequence of this mission, he became the principal adviser of King William I of the Netherlands on the Nicaragua Canal.

In the autumn of 1836, Verveer was appointed a Royal Commissioner by King William I of the Netherlands and charged with concluding a treaty with the King of Ashanti Kwaku Dua I Panyin to facilitate the recruitment of soldiers to the Royal Netherlands Indies Army. Verveer arrived in Elmina, the capital of the Dutch Gold Coast, on 1 November 1836, and departed for the Ashanti capital of Kumasi with a retinue of about 900 people, the majority of whom were porters carrying provisions and gifts. After lengthy negotiations, an agreement was reached in Kumasi, resulting in the establishment of a recruiting office in Kumasi headed by Jacob Huydecoper.

After having concluded the treaty, Verveer returned to the Netherlands together with Kwasi Boakye and Kwame Poku, two young Ashanti princes who were to receive education in the Netherlands. A year later, however, Verveer was sent back to the Gold Coast to quell the rebellion of Ahanta. Verveer became ill during this campaign and died on the ship that was to take him home to the Netherlands.

== In the arts ==
Jan Verveer is portrayed in the 1997 novel The Two Hearts of Kwasi Boachi by Arthur Japin.
