= Christiaan Lans =

Christiaan Ernst Lans
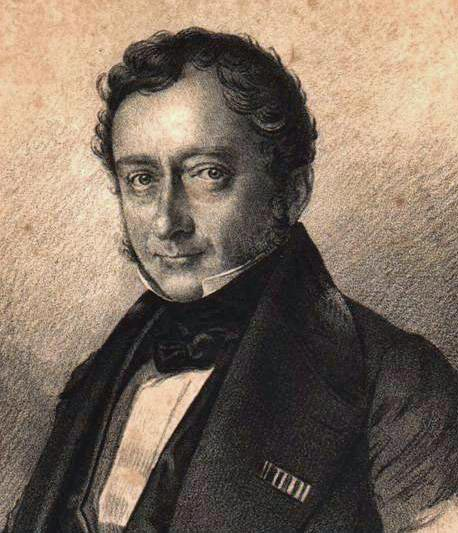

Commander of the Dutch Gold Coast
- In office 11 May 1833 – 2 December 1836
- Monarch: William I of the Netherlands
- Preceded by: Martinus Swarte
- Succeeded by: Hendrik Tonneboeijer

Personal details
- Born: 12 September 1789 Amsterdam, Dutch Republic
- Died: 17 August 1843 (aged 53) Diepenveen, Netherlands

Christiaan Ernst Lans (born 12 September 1789 – 17 August 1843) was a soldier in the Royal Netherlands Army who by royal decree of 2 December 1832 was appointed Commander of the Dutch Gold Coast. He took office on 11 May 1833 and served until 1836, upon which he returned to the Netherlands.

Lans was Commander of the Dutch Gold Coast when the ambitious George Maclean was Governor of the British Gold Coast. Lans tried to settle territorial disputes with the British in a peaceful manner. When he returned to the Netherlands in 1836, he was succeeded by the young and erratic Hendrik Tonneboeijer.
