= Treaty of Axim =

1642 treaty between the Netherlands and the chiefs of Axim

Treaty of Axim (1642)
Agreement between General Jacob Ruijchaver of the Dutch West India Company and the caboceers of Axim
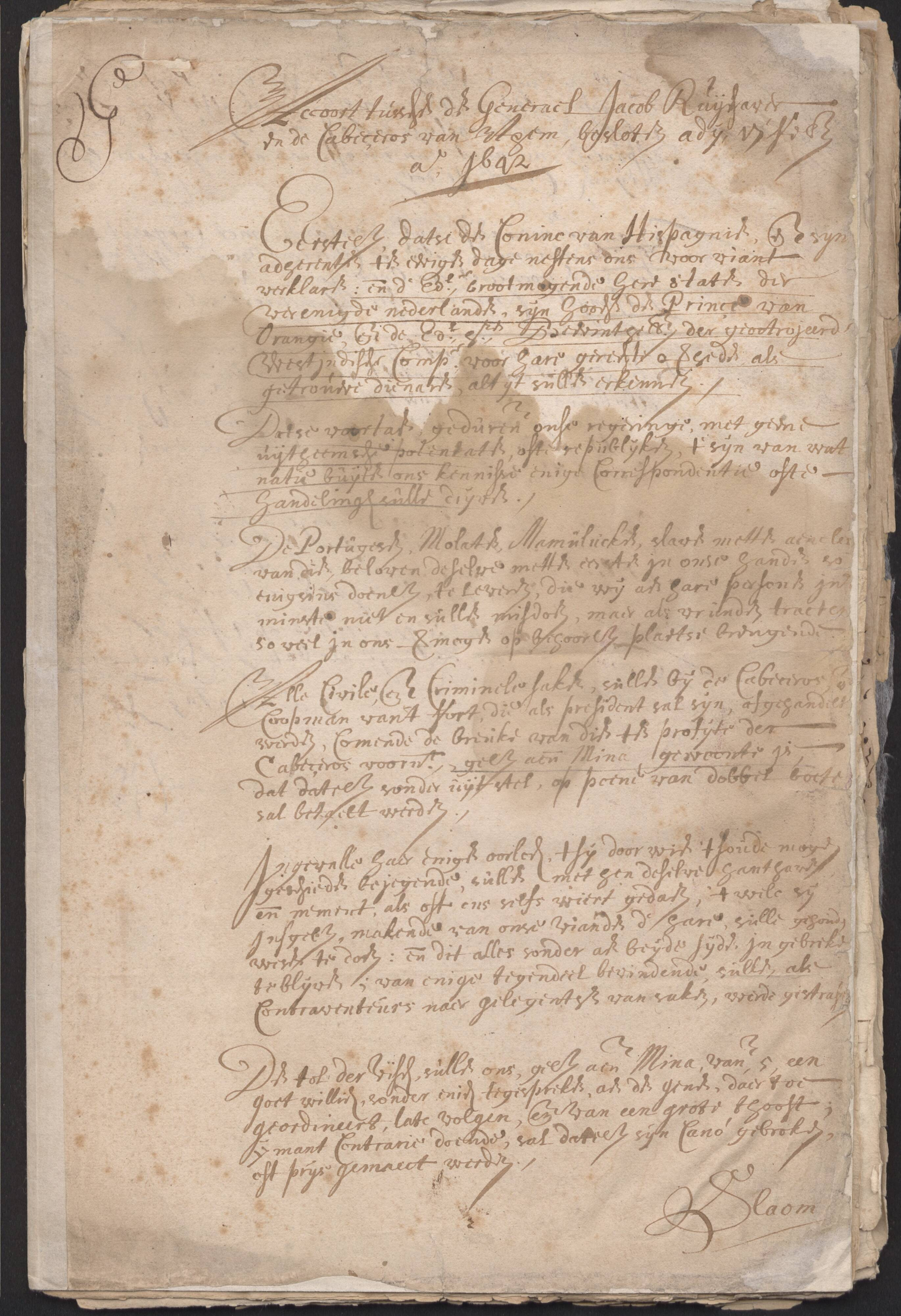
- First page of the Treaty of Axim.
- Type: Agreement confirming mutual jurisdictions and regulating mutual obligations
- Signed: 17 February 1642
- Location: Axim (now Ghana)
- Effective: 17 February 1642
- Expiration: 6 April 1872 (some parts earlier)
- Signatories: Director general of the Dutch Gold Coast; Chiefs of Axim
- Parties: States General of the Netherlands; Dutch West India Company; Government of Axim
- Language: Dutch

Full text
- Treaty of Axim (1642) at Wikisource

The Treaty of Axim was concluded between the Netherlands and the chiefs of Axim in the western region of the Gold Coast (West Africa) and signed at Fort St. Anthony near Axim on 17 February 1642. The treaty regulated the jurisdiction of the Netherlands and the Dutch West India Company in the town and polity of Axim after the Dutch West India Company had successfully attacked the Portuguese who were the occupants of Fort St. Anthony in the town. Over time, the agreement was in part superseded and replaced by new contracts and agreements. The treaty did remain the basis for Dutch jurisdiction and political relations between Axim and the Dutch until the latter left the Gold Coast in 1872.

== Background ==
The state of Axim, in what is now the Western Region of the Republic of Ghana, constituted a regional power in the form of a city state with two chiefs, each with their own territory and constituency. Axim had been a Portuguese trading post since the late 15th century, fortified with the fort St. Antonio (St. Anthony) since the early 16th century.

After conquering the Portuguese main establishment at Elmina in 1637, the Dutch West India Company quickly broke Portuguese resistance elsewhere along the coast. The fort at Axim was the main remaining stronghold. The Dutch captured the fort in 1642, gave the Portuguese and their allies free passage, and negotiated a treaty with the political leadership of Axim in order to normalise the situation. With the conquest of Axim, the Dutch became the major power in the area.

The agreement with the two paramount chiefs of Axim was concluded on 17 February 1642, immediately after the conquest of the fort. The agreement included several distinctive elements, dealing with very different issues. In the first place, the shift in allegiance from the Portuguese to the Dutch was tackled with a declaration of enmity towards the enemies of the Dutch. In terms of jurisdiction the Dutch demanded control over the foreign affairs of the state, presumably only in relation to other European powers, though it could be read to include all foreign nations.

The Portuguese and their allies in the fort and town were given safe passage and assistance with their departure from Axim. The remainder of the treaty dealt with mutual assistance in time of war, judicial authority, taxes and trade regulations. For the latter on copied the regulations in force at Elmina, which may have been the same as those in force under Portuguese jurisdiction.

In diplomatic terms only part of the agreement can be considered a proper treaty. Over the years the domestic regulations were renewed repeatedly through negotiated contracts. Moreover, their character is not really diplomatic. In this respect the Treaty of Axim differed considerably from the Treaty of Butre drawn up 14 years later. In that document only diplomatic and political issues were dealt with (peace and friendship and establishing a protectorate), which made that treaty remain in force in its entirety for more than 213 years. This was not the case with the Treaty of Axim, although the diplomatic and political framework remained in force until the Dutch left the Gold Coast on 6 April 1872.

== Content ==
=== Title ===
The treaty is titled "Agreement between the General Jacob Ruijchaver and the caboceros of Axem, sealed A.D. 17 February 1642." Ruijchaver was the incumbent director general of the Dutch Gold Coast, the senior officer of the Dutch West India Company in Africa and the representative of the States General, the sovereign power of the Republic of the United Netherlands. The "caboceros of Axem" where the two paramount chiefs of Axim, in charge of Upper and Lower Axim respectively.

=== Location and date ===
The treaty was signed by both the Axim and Dutch delegates at fort St. Anthony in Axim on 17 February 1642 and took effect immediately.

=== Contracting partners ===
The contracting parties on the Dutch side were: the Dutch West India Company, for itself, and by way of its director general representing the States General, the sovereign power of the country, for the Republic of the United Netherlands. Signatory was general Jacob Ruijchaver, director general of the Dutch Gold Coast.

The contracting partners on the Axim side were the "caboceers" (chiefs) of Axim, presumably represented by the two paramount chiefs of the state, also the signatories of the treaty, Atty Ansi and Peter Agoey.

=== Terms ===
The treaty or agreement dealt with matters of allegiance and security, as well as domestic affairs in ten articles.

1. The Axim chiefs declare with the Dutch that the King of Spain and his allies are to be an enemy forever. They further declare to acknowledge as legitimate authorities the States General of the United Netherlands, His Highness the Prince of Orange, and the Dutch West India Company, of which they declare to be loyal servants.
2. The Axim leaders were not allowed to correspond or trade with any foreign nation without permission from the Dutch authorities.
3. The Dutch promised safe passage to the Portuguese, Africans of mixed Euro-African descent, Muslims, and slaves that were part of the Portuguese establishment, and their dependants, on condition that they accept Dutch authority.
4. Civil and criminal matters were to be dealt with by the chiefs of Axim and the "merchant of the fort" (i.e. the Dutch governor), who will act as president. The fines imposed go to the chiefs, as was the practice in Elmina.
5. In case of a war being waged against the contracting parties by an outside party, the contracting parties were to assist each other forthwith on pain of punishment.
6. The excise on fish is set at the same level as at Elmina: 1 good fish in 5 and the head of a big fish. Evasion of payment would incur a penalty of the fishing canoe being broken or confiscated.
7. Ownership of all houses, gardens, compounds, and the fort, formerly property of the Portuguese, is transferred to the Dutch government to be used for any purpose. No one is allowed to damage the property.
8. The chiefs of Axim are paid one ounce of gold for each newly arriving ship from the Netherlands, bringing cargo for the Gold Coast. Depending on the value or volume of goods unloaded that sum will be increased or decreased.
9. Africans buying goods at Axim are allowed a "dash" (gift) in accordance with the system used in Elmina.
10. To assure that the treaty is binding, the parties will sign the document, and the chiefs of Axim each hand over one of their sons to the Dutch.

== See also ==
- Treaty of Asebu (1612)
- Treaty of Butre (1656)
- Gold Coast (British colony)
- List of colonial heads of the Dutch Gold Coast
- Swedish Gold Coast
