= Albert van Dantzig =

Dutch historian (1937–2000)

- Born: 16 March 1937; Amsterdam, Netherlands
- Died: 27 July 2000 (aged 63); The Hague, Netherlands
- Occupation: Historian

Albert van Dantzig (16 March 1937 – 27 July 2000) was a Dutch historian of the Dutch colonization of the Gold Coast. From 1963 until his retirement, he served as professor of history at the University of Ghana at Legon.

== Biography ==
Van Dantzig moved to Paris in 1961 to do a PhD at the School for Advanced Studies in the Social Sciences under the supervision of Henri Brunschwig. Two years later, Van Dantzig moved to Ghana when he was given the opportunity to teach at the University of Ghana. He defended his thesis in 1970, which was eventually published in 1980.

While in Ghana, Van Dantzig married a Togolese woman with whom he had a daughter. In the late 1990s, Van Dantzig and his family decided to move to the Netherlands where he could be better treated for Alzheimer's disease, with which he had been diagnosed. Albert van Dantzig died in 2000.

== Bibliography ==
- Dantzig. A. van, La démission hollandaise en Afrique occidentale au dix-neuvième siècle. Paris 1963.
- Dantzig. A. van, ‘Le traité d’échange de territoires sur la Côte de l’Or entre la Grande-Bretagne et les Pays-Bas en 1867’, Cahiers d’Etudes Africaines 4 (1963) 69-96.
- Dantzig, A. van, Het Nederlandse aandeel in de slavenhandel. Bussum 1968.
- Dantzig. A. van, ‘The Ankobra Gold Interest’, Transactions of the Historical Society of Ghana 14 (1973) 169-185.
- Dantzig. A. van, ‘Castles and Forts of Ghana as a Collective Historical Monument’, in: M. Dodds (ed.), Ghana Talks. 1976. 49-67.
- Dantzig. A. van, ‘South-Western Ghana and the Akan-Speaking Areas of the Ivory Coast: A Survey of the Historical Evidence’, in: J.O. Hunwick (ed.), Proceedings of the Seminar on Ghanaian Historiography and Historical Research. n.p. 1977. 55-71.
- Dantzig. A. van, Forts and Castles of Ghana. Accra 1980.
- Dantzig. A. van, Les Hollandais sur la côte de Guinée à l’époque de l’essorde l’Ashanti et du Dahomey, 1680-1740. Paris 1980.
- Dantzig. A. van, ‘La “jurisdiction” du fort Saint Antoine d’Axim’, in: 2000 ans d’histoire africaine; le sol, la parole et l’écrit; mélanges en hommage à R. Mauny. N.p. 1981. Vol. 2, 685-698.
- Dantzig, A. van, ‘Les Hollandais sur la Côte des Esclaves: parties gagnées et parties perdues’, Études africaines offertes à Henri Brunschwig(1982) 79-89.
- Dantzig, A. van, ‘Effects of the Atlantic Slave-trade on Some West African Societies’, in: J.E. Inikori (ed.), Forced migration: The Impact of the Export Slave-trade on African Societies. N.p. 1982. 187-201.
- Dantzig, A. van, ‘The Furley Collection’, in: European Sources for Sub-Saharan Africa before 1900: Use and Abuse. Paideuma: Mitteilungen zur Kulturkunde 33 (1987).
- Dantzig, A. van & Barbara Priddy, A short history of the forts and castles of Ghana. Accra 1971.
