= Butre, Ghana =

Butre
- Village
- Location within Ghana
- Coordinates: 4°49′23″N 1°55′01″W
- Country: Ghana
- Region: Western Region
- District: Ahanta West District
- Elevation: 115 ft (35 m)
- Time zone: GMT
  - Summer (DST): GMT

Butre is a village in the Ahanta West district, district in the Western Region of Ghana. Butre contains the Fort Batenstein Castle.

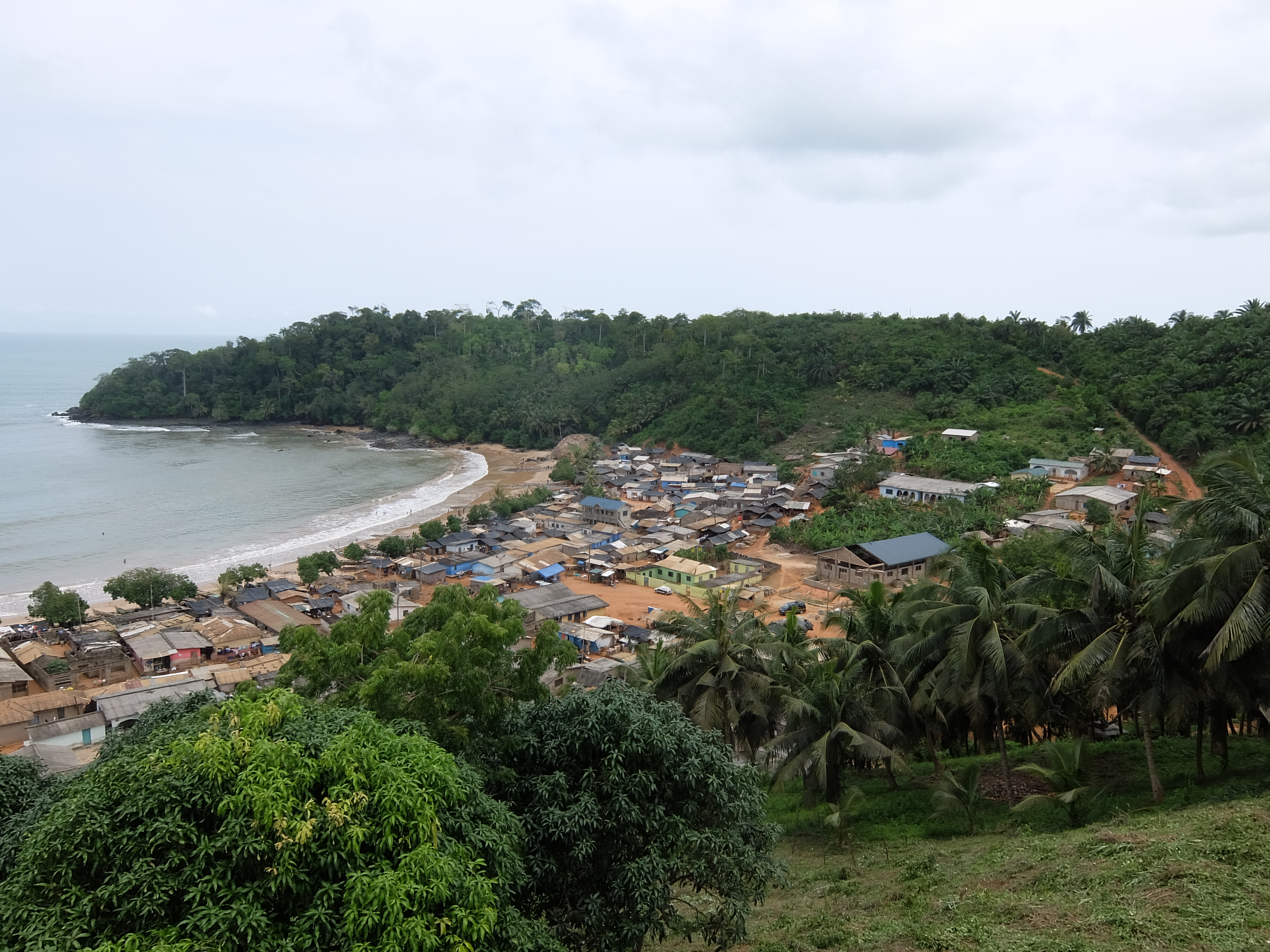
Butre, seen from Fort Batenstein
