= Ahanta people =

Akan people in Ghana

Ahanta
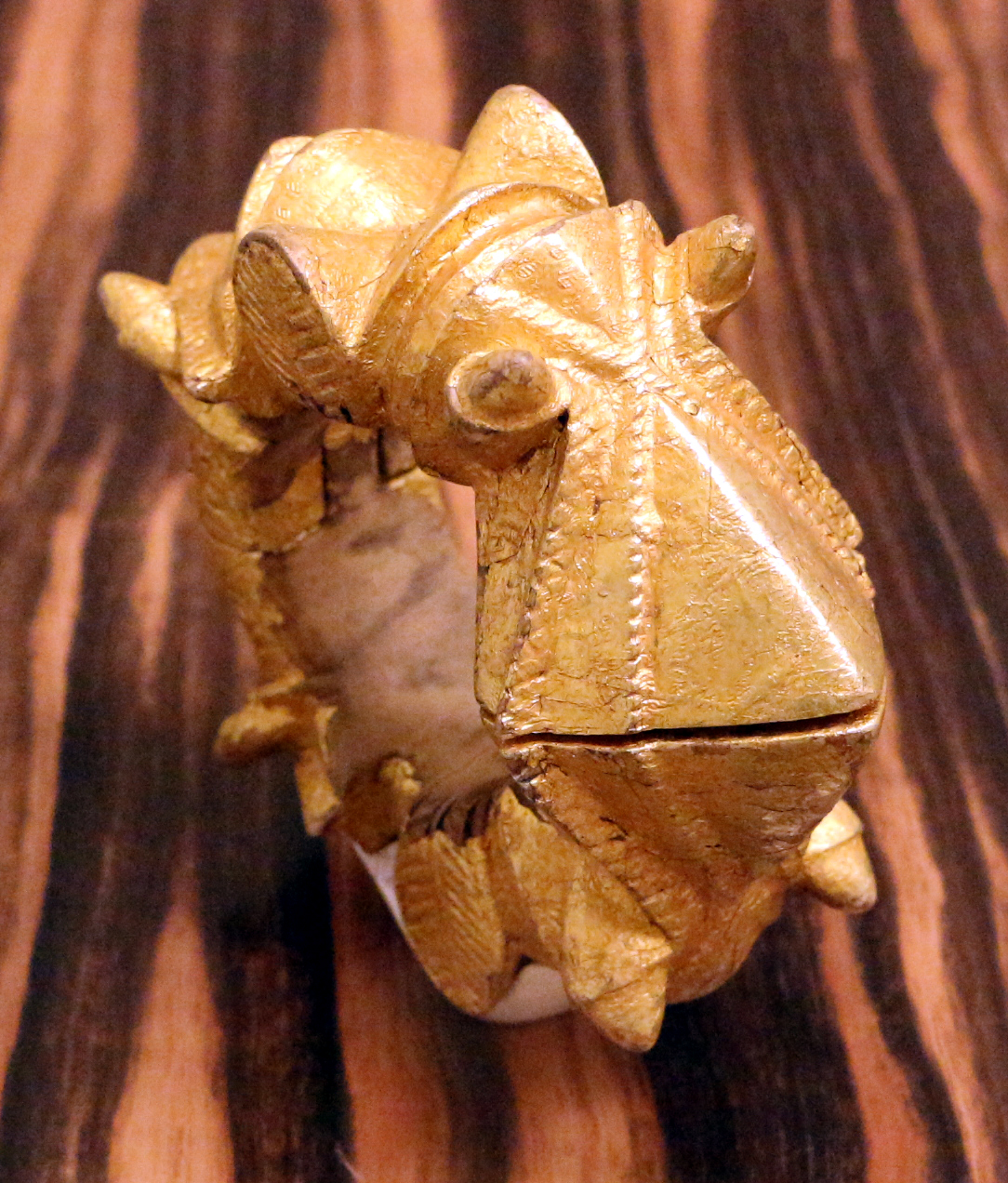

Total population
- ~500,000

Regions with significant populations
- Western Region Ghana

Languages
- Ahanta, French, English

Religion
- African traditional religion, Christianity

Related ethnic groups
- Akan

The Ahanta/Ayinda are an Akan people who live to the north and east of the Nzema. The Ahanta land has been historically known as one of the richest areas on the coast of what is now Ghana.

The Ahanta is now in the Western Region of the Republic of Ghana. Some of their famous areas include Busua, Kojokrom, Apowa, Agona Nkwanta, Dixcove, Princess Town (also known as Pokesu). It is also a regional power in the form of a confederacy of chiefdoms which had come in early contact with the European nations settling on the Gold Coast for the purpose of trade.

== Etymology ==
The name "Ahanta" derives from nta, Akan for "the twins".

== History ==
Ahanta means the land of twins. How Ahanta became known as the land of twins is not certainly known, since there are other meanings or accounts which seem more accurate and convincing. One theory is that it could be linked to the fertility of Ahanta women and multiple births which was very predominant then on Ahanta lands then. Some indigenous cultural practices around that time also saw births of twins as a taboo. As such, Ahanta's welcoming the birth of twins was likely to earn her the title, 'land of twins'.

Ahanta belongs to several Congo-Niger languages such as Igbo in Nigeria, Edo in Benin and all the Akan languages stretching across the South of the Sahara Desert from Togo to Cote D'Voire. It is one of the sub units of several kwa languages across the forest belt of Sub-Sahara Africa. Ahanta is very old, and the language faces possible extinction in the next 10 or 20 years as recently showed in a research conducted by the University of Cape Coast. The Ahanta people scarcely speak or teach the language. For instance in Sekondi -Takoradi the Ahanta culture has slowly died.

A more precise, accurate convincing, consistent and backed by facts about the migration of Ahanta is that Nana Badu Bonso and his descendants came from the mouth of a Whale. Legend has it that he fought his way through from the Pra river and settled at Busua which was then the abode of mighty Whales. He then established his authority over all the conquered lands and form his kingdom. It is worth mentioning here that before the arrival of Ahantas, the land was already inhabited by indigenes who were probably Guans so the present Ahanta people are descendants of Guans, those who migrated from the Bono kingdom and other vassal states which later migrated into the Ahanta kingdom. It was the conquering exploits from the Pra river to the sea at Busua that rather earned the warlord of Ahanta Otumfour Badu Bonso contrary to the account that he came from the mouth of a Whale but whatever that it was, all the accounts surrounding the migration story of the Ahanta people make our history and culture rich. The royal title for Ahantahene was suspected to be "beduru bonso" which literally means to have reached the Whales and later corrupted to be Badu Bonso as years go by. He is believed to have possessed some whimsical powers that made him to conquer enemies with ease and thus the title Otumfour which means the powerful one.

Between 1300 and 1400 after arrival of Ahantas to their present location particularly the Bono group, they quickly organised themselves into a powerful kingdom which was made of chiefdoms along the Atlantic coast from the Pra to the Ankobra rivers. They had already lived in the Bono kingdom so organising themselves into kingdom and chiefdoms were something they did without much difficulties since they were already practicing most of traditions of the Bonos. A kingdom that enjoy prominence, glory, power and supremacy until the Europeans particularly the Dutch arrived in Gold Coast. The Ahanta kingdom then started to receive stiff opposition and interferences from foreign invasions particularly from the Dutch and started to lose its thresholds.

The Portuguese were the first Europeans to arrive in Gold Coast in 1471 and built their permanent trading post at Elmina in 1482. In 1515, they built Fort St. Anthony at Axim and in 1626, they built Fort Sebastian at Shama. The Portuguese have quickly expanded their trading activities across Ahanta from Shama to Pokesu covering almost the total land area of the Ahanta kingdom. The Dutch led by Barent Eriksz arrived in 1591 and by 1598, other Dutch traders had also arrived in Gold Coast and started to pose stiff opposition to the Portuguese. Through the efforts of General Jacob Clantius, the Dutch secured a permission to build Fort Nassau near Moree through the Asebu treaty. In the preceding years, the Dutch constantly battled the Portuguese to drive them out of Gold Coast in order to gain control over the trade which eventually turned out to be a slave trade. In 1637, the Dutch captured Elmina Castle, Fort Sebastian at Shama in 1640 and in 1642, they had captured Fort Antonio in Axim. Aside ceasing Forts and Castles of the Portuguese, the Dutch built Fort Orange in Sekondi in 1642 and Fort Batenstein in Butre in 1656. By 1717 they have succeeded in driving the Portuguese away and gained control over the trade particularly in Ahanta areas.

Ahanta became the main trading grounds for the Dutch in Gold Coast. On 27 August 1656, the Butre treaty was signed between the Ahanta chiefs and the Dutch which made Ahanta a protectorate of the Dutch from the attacks of other European nations who had interest in the ongoing slave trade. A pact which lasted for 213 years until 1871 when the Dutch left the Gold Coast and the British took over. It was the longest pact between a European nation and an African state. This pact became the basis for the annihilation and desolation of Ahanta as expedient forces marshalled by the Dutch marched on Ahanta on 30 June 1838 led by Major-General Jan Verveer from the Royal Netherlands Army. Major Ahanta towns like Takoradi and Busua were massacred and a large military presence was maintained in Ahanta. Asantehene alone offered 30,000 troops but the Dutch turned down his offer and believed it to be a ploy for the Ashantis to gain direct trading access with the Europeans at the coast.

In the course of war, Badu Bonso II was captured. On 27 July 1838, he was hanged, after which his head was removed and sent to Netherlands where it got lost for more than a century. It was later rediscovered at Leiden University Medical Centre by one Arthur Japin who was conducting research and had earlier on read about this great Ahanta king who stood against foreign invasion and interferences. The head had been stored in a jar of formaldehyde for about 170 years. In 2009, after a brief ceremony was conducted in Hague, the head was returned to Ghana, previously known as the Gold Coast, where it was originally taken away by the Dutch. In 1871, the Dutch government sold all their colonial possessions in West Africa to the British Empire as per the terms of the Anglo-Dutch Treaties of 1870–1871. The British took over from the Dutch until 1957 when Gold Coast became independent.

== Culture ==
The Ahanta people celebrate the Kundum festival. Kundum is a harvest festival consisting of dancing, drumming, and feasting. It was originally a religious festival that was used to expel evil spirits from the town. Today, Kundum is celebrated as a way to preserve the culture of the Ahanta people and neighboring Nzema. The festival formally was a month long, however has been reduced to eight days.

Ahantas practise traditional African religion, Christianity, and Islam to a lesser extent.

== Notable people ==
- Ebo Quagraine, Real Estate Investor, Mentor, Coach, and co-founder of Propertyzz.com
- Nana Kobina Nketsia IV, first African vice chancellor of University of Ghana.
- John Canoe, a chief that had a festival that originated in Jamaica then got spread else where in The Caribbean, and North Carolina in his honour.
- Otumfour Badu Bonsu II, an Ahanta King
- John Bonaventure Kwofie, CSSp, an archbishop of the Catholic church in Ghana.
- Ebenezer Kojo Kum, a Ghanaian politician who is a member of the NPP.
- Mavis Kuukua Bissue, a Ghanaian politician who is a member of the NDC.
