= The Two Hearts of Kwasi Boachi =

1997 novel by Arthur Japin

- English edition cover
- Author: Arthur Japin
- Original title: De zwarte met het witte hart
- Translator: Ina Rilke
- Language: Dutch
- Genre: Historical novel
- Publisher: Arbeiderspers (Netherlands); Knopf (United States)
- Publication date: 1997
- English publication date: 2000
- ISBN: 978-0-375-71889-2 (US edition, Vintage 2002)
- Preceded by: Magonische verhalen (short stories, 1996)
- Followed by: De vierde wand (short stories, 1998)

The Two Hearts of Kwasi Boachi (Dutch: De zwarte met het witte hart [də ˈzʋɑrtə mɛt ət ˈʋɪtə ˈɦɑrt], "The black with the white heart") is the 1997 debut novel by Dutch author Arthur Japin. The novel tells the story of two Ashanti princes, Kwame Poku and Kwasi Boachi, who were taken from what is today Ghana and given to the Dutch king William II in 1837 as a surety in a business transaction between the Dutch and Ashanti Empire. The two boys are raised and educated in the Netherlands, after which Kwame returns to Africa while Kwasi continues his education in Weimar Germany and then takes a position in the Dutch East Indies. The novel is a postcolonial depiction of the Dutch colonial past. It quickly became a bestseller and was translated worldwide, and is now considered a classic of Dutch modern literature.

== Plot ==
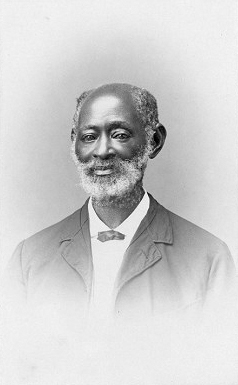
Kwasi Boachi in 1900

The novel purports to be a memoir written in 1900 by Kwasi Boachi, one of two Ashanti princes taken from their homeland to the Netherlands in 1837 to receive a Christian education. It is mostly based on historical fact, and set partly in the nineteenth-century Dutch Gold Coast. Kwasi and his fellow Ashanti prince Kwame Poku are pestered at their school in Delft and attract a measure of attention from the royal court, which views the boys as curiosities and, while favoring them for the while, fails to offer them continued support. Kwasi and Kwame grow apart; Kwasi chooses to assimilate himself into Dutch culture and deny his Ashanti background, while Kwame is unable to adapt to his new environment. He returns to what is now Ghana, but finds himself an outcast there as he has by now forgotten his native language; no longer accepted by his own people, whom he never sees again. Almost three years are spent waiting in Fort Elmina for permission to return to his people while he slowly appears to sink into delusion, then commits suicide. Meanwhile, Kwasi attempts to seek his fortune in the Dutch East Indies but fails, owing in part to the prevalence of racism and a personal grudge held by one of his former classmates, who is his superior in the East Indies.

== Background, research and aftereffects ==
The book is based in part on Japin's own traumatic youth, and in part on historical research—Japin spent ten years researching the novel, a postcolonial exposé of the (short-lived) expansion of the Dutch colonial empire into West-Africa. The novel's action takes place in Africa, Weimar, and the Netherlands. While researching for the book in Ghana, home of the Ashanti Kingdom, Japin was kidnapped but managed to escape from his captors.

During his research, Japin came across the story of Badu Bonsu II, a Ghanaian prince who rebelled against the Dutch overlords in 1837 and was executed and decapitated, after which his head was shipped to the Netherlands. Japin discovered the head in 2005, in the Leiden University Medical Center (LUMC). In March 2009, government officials announced that it would be returned to its homeland for proper burial, a promise fulfilled on 23 July 2009, after a ceremony held in The Hague.

== Critical reception ==
The book was an instant success in the Netherlands, and is now considered a classic of modern Dutch literature. Its English translation was praised in The New York Times as "Japin's rich and risky first novel", "a deeply humane book about a spectacularly exotic subject"; and by Heidi Benson in the San Francisco Chronicle as "a true story, fully and humanly imagined, and that is the measure of Japin's accomplishment." The novel was also positively reviewed in Ghana; a reviewer in The Statesman wrote: "With simple and poignant prose, Japin is able to convincingly take the voice of a real-life historical figure, and thus illuminate the past sins of the author's own country, as well as those of a long-dead Ashanti king."

== Translations and adaptations ==
It was translated in English as The Two Hearts of Kwasi Boachi (2000) and in Portuguese as O preto de coração branco (2003). In November 2007, an opera based on the novel premiered in Rotterdam, with an English libretto by Japin and music by the British composer Jonathan Dove.

== See also ==
- Elmina Java Museum
