= Arthur Japin =

Dutch novelist (born 1956)

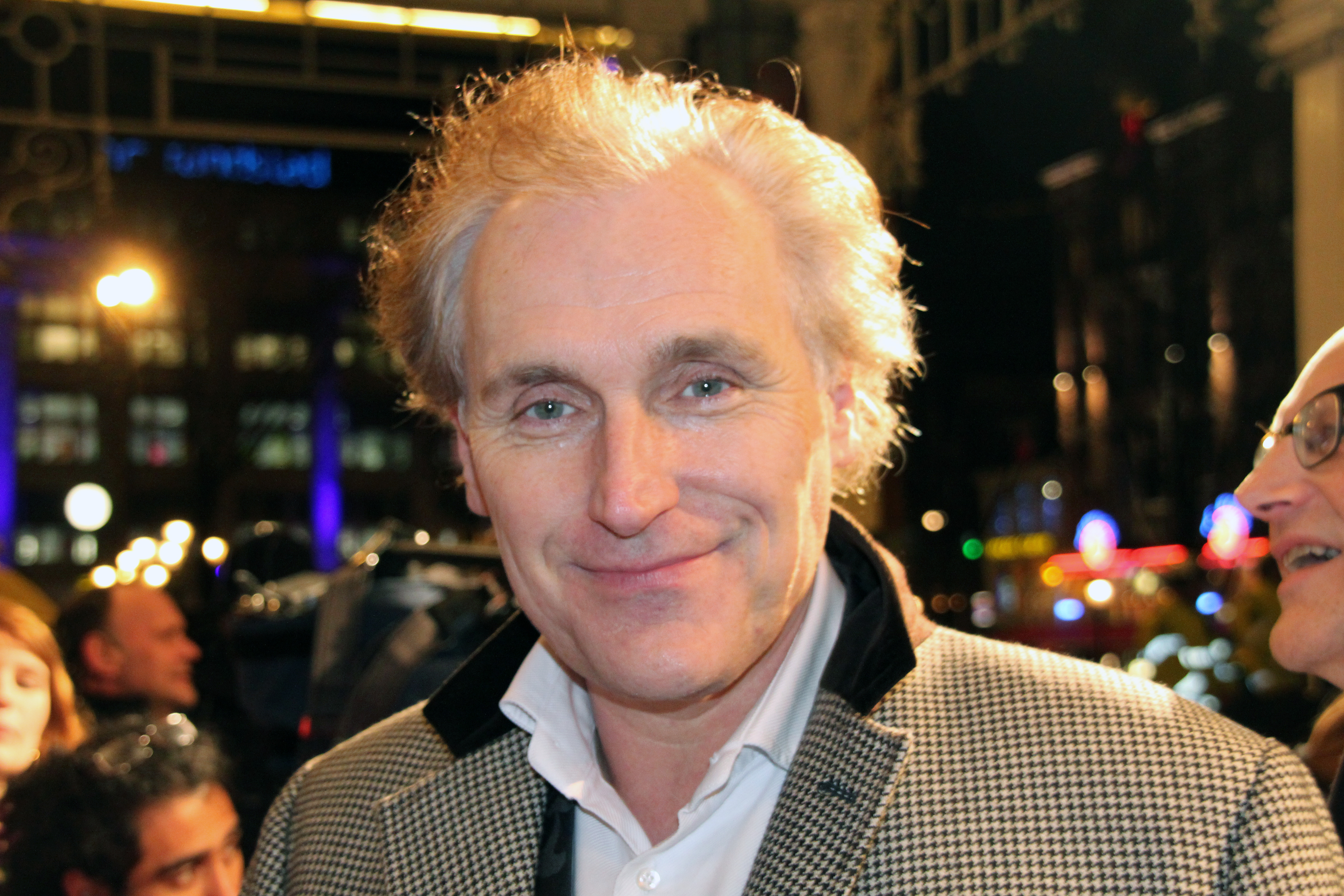
- Arthur Japin
- Born: 26 July 1956 (age 70); Haarlem, Netherlands
- Occupation: Novelist
- Partner: Benjamin Moser

Arthur Valentijn Japin (born 26 July 1956) is a Dutch novelist. He has won almost every prestigious prize in Dutch literature, including the Libris Prize for his 2005 novel Een Schitterend Gebrek.

== Biography ==
Arthur Japin, son of a teacher and detective novelist, experienced a difficult childhood marked by his father's suicide in 1969. He later trained as an actor at the Kleinkunstacademie in Amsterdam and briefly sang opera at De Nederlandse Opera.

His first novel, De zwarte met het witte hart (1997), translated as The Two Hearts of Kwasi Boachi, was the story of two Ashanti princes, Kwame Poku and Kwasi Boachi, who were taken from today's Ghana and taken to the court of the Dutch king Willem I in 1837. In November 2007, an opera based on the novel premiered in Rotterdam, with an English libretto by Arthur Japin and music by the British composer Jonathan Dove.

His second book, De droom van de leeuw (2002), is a novelized version of his relationship with the Dutch actress and novelist Rosita Steenbeek in Rome, where Steenbeek became the last lover of the Italian director Federico Fellini. His third novel, Een schitterend gebrek, translated as In Lucia's Eyes (2003), was a return to the historical novel, about Casanova's first lover, Lucia, who, he reports in his memoirs, inexplicably abandoned him in his youth, only to resurface years later as a hideous prostitute in an Amsterdam brothel. Japin was hailed as a great writer after his first couple of novels already, a status confirmed when he was asked to write the 2006 Boekenweekgeschenk: De grote wereld is a novella about a pair of circus-performing dwarves caught in Nazi Germany, which had a record first printing of 813,000 copies.

His 2007 novel De overgave, to be translated as Someone Found, takes the subject of the 19th-century Texas–Indian wars, dramatizing the story of the Fort Parker Massacre of 1836, in which a white girl, Cynthia Ann Parker, was taken as a Comanche hostage, later becoming the mother of the famous Comanche chief Quanah Parker.

Japin has also published several volumes of stories. The first two, Magonische verhalen and De vierde wand, were gathered into the omnibus Alle verhalen (2005). Magonische verhalen was made into the film Magonia by the Dutch director Ineke Smits. He has won almost every prestigious prize in Dutch literature, including the Libris Prize for Een schitterend gebrek.

== Personal life ==
Japin lives in Utrecht with his partners, Lex Jansen, who is also his publicist, and Benjamin Moser, an American writer.

== Bibliography ==
- 1991: Heijermans!, a play, published by Het Nederlands Volkstoneel
- 1996: Magonische verhalen
- 1997: De zwarte met het witte hart, novel, translated as The Two Hearts of Kwasi Boachi
- 1998: De vierde wand, travel stories
- 2001: Magonia, screenplay (based upon several of the ‘Magonische verhalen’)
- 2002: De droom van de leeuw, novel
- 2002: De vrouwen van Lemnos, choreographical screenplay
- 2003: Een schitterend gebrek, novel, translated as In Lucia's Eyes
- 2004: Dooi & Zeep, two stories illustrated by Arthur Japin, published by Uitgeverij Brokaat
- 2005: Alle verhalen
- 2006: Dooi en zeep
- 2006: De klank van sneeuw, two stories
- 2006: De grote wereld, Book Week Gift
- 2007: De overgave, novel, winner of the 2008 NS Publieksprijs, translated as Someone Found
- 2008: Zoals dat gaat met wonderen. Dagboeken 2000-2007
- 2010: Vaslav, novel
- 2011: Kussenboek (citaten)
- 2012: Maar buiten is het feest, novel
- 2013: De man van je leven, novel
- 2015: De gevleugelde, novel
- 2017: Kolja, novel
- 2019: Geluk, een geheimtaal. Dagboeken 2008-2018
- 2020: Mrs. Degas, novel
- 2022: Wat stilte wil (roman)
- 2022: Mijn verzonnen familie (schrijvensprentenboek)
- 2023: Hoe valt een schrijver uit de trein? (Grafische roman, illustraties: Eric J. Coolen)
- 2024: Het Stravinsky-spel (roman)
- 2026: Lord M (roman)

(except as noted, all published by De Arbeiderspers, Amsterdam)

Japin has also written several screenplays, radio plays, songs, and theater pieces. His songs have appeared on the CDs Vol verlangen and Nuances van Liefde, sung by Astrid Seriese.

== Prizes ==
- 1990 - Gorcumse Literatuurprijs for De klap van Ediep Koning
- 1995 - LIRA-prijs for De roering van het kielzog
- 1995 - Literaire prijs van de provincie Gelderland for De draden van Anansi
- 1998 - Lucy B. en C.W. van der Hoogtprijs for De zwarte met het witte hart
- 1998 - Halewijn-literatuurprijs van de stad Roermond for his body of work
- 1999 - ECI-prijs voor Schrijvers van Nu for De zwarte met het witte hart
- 2004 - Libris literatuurprijs for Een schitterend gebrek
- 2005 - De Inktaap for Een schitterend gebrek
- 2008 - NS Publieksprijs for De overgave

== Film ==
- 1996: Hoerenpreek, a television film by Ineke Smits
- 1996: De Wolkenfabriek, a television film by Ineke Smits
- 2000: Magonia, film version of Magonische verhalen by Ineke Smits, starring Dirk Roofthooft, Willem Voogd, Jack Wouterse, Linda van Dyck and Ramsey Nasr; also on DVD.

== Television ==
Japin hosted the Dutch adaptation of the British panel game QI. The first episode was broadcast on 27 December 2008 but the series was discontinued after only six episodes.
