= Willem Le Jeune =

Dutch colonial administrator and diplomat

Consul of the Netherlands in Elmina
- In office 1 March 1873 – 15 March 1874
- Preceded by: Office established
- Succeeded by: Pieter Simon Hamel

Agent of the Netherlands in Elmina
- In office 28 April 1872 – 1 March 1873
- Preceded by: Office established
- Succeeded by: Office disestablished

Governor of the Dutch Gold Coast
- ad interim
- In office 28 October 1871 – 15 November 1871
- Monarch: William III of the Netherlands
- Preceded by: Johannes Marinus Ludovicus Adrianus Petrus Wirix
- Succeeded by: Jan Helenus Ferguson

Personal details
- Born: 6 January 1832; The Hague, Netherlands
- Died: 28 March 1894 (aged 62); Saint-Josse-ten-Noode, Belgium
- Spouse: Maria Auguste Lisette Luther

Willem Pieter Antonie Le Jeune (born 6 January 1832 – 28 March 1894), born as Willem Pieter Antonie Tenwinkel, was a Dutch colonial administrator and diplomat, who made a career in the administration on the Dutch Gold Coast and who was interim governor between 28 October 1871 and 15 November 1871. After the Netherlands sold its possessions on the Gold Coast to the United Kingdom in 1872, Le Jeune became the first Dutch consul in Elmina.

== Biography ==
Willem Pieter Antonie Le Jeune was born in The Hague to Pieter Antonie Tenwinkel and Christine Henriëtte Böttger.

=== Career in the colonial administration of the Dutch Gold Coast ===
Le Jeune was appointed assistant on the Coast of Guinea by royal decree no. 97 of 27 October 1857, departed to the Gold Coast on 29 November 1857, and arrived in Elmina on 22 January 1858. He started his career in the administration of the Gold Coast as a substitute judge at the Court of Justice in Elmina and was promoted to commandant of Fort Lijdzaamheid at Apam on 3 January 1859. On 8 November 1859, Le Jeune was appointed commandant of Fort Orange at Sekondi. On 14 March 1861, he was granted European leave and left the Gold Coast. Le Jeune returned on 10 February 1862 and was again appointed commandant of Fort Orange. In August 1862, he was appointed commandant of Fort San Sebastian at Shama, and in the following years until 1866, he served as commandant of Fort Batenstein at Butre, of Fort Crèvecoeur at Accra and of Fort Saint Anthony at Axim.

While commandant of Fort Saint Anthony, on 25 July 1866, Le Jeune was promoted to the rank of resident. In January 1867, he left the outer forts for Elmina Castle, where he became registrar of the civil registry, director of the newly established post office, and notary. In April 1867, he was installed adjutant to the newly arrived governor George Pieter Willem Boers. In May 1868, just after the Convention for an Interchange of Territory on the Gold Coast between the United Kingdom and the Netherlands had been put into effect, Le Jeune went on European leave again, and returned in February 1869. By that time, the trade of forts had proved to be a disaster for the Dutch, as the alliance of Elmina and the Dutch colonial government with the Ashanti did not fare well with the Fante people around the new forts assigned to the Dutch, prompting a Fante Confederacy to lay siege to Elmina. Just after Le Jeune's arrival, the wealthy Elmina trader George Emil Eminsang and the military commander L.H. Meijer were sent on a mission to the Netherlands by the Elmina government to plead the case for Elmina.

Le Jeune, who by now was a well-experienced administrator, immediately took up the position of bookkeeper, officer of justice, secretary, cashier, and bailiff, making him second-in-command of the colony. In May 1869, he welcomed governor Cornelis Nagtglas to the coast, who was appointed by the Dutch minister for the colonies Engelbertus de Waal to replace governor Boers, after the minister had heard the pleas of Eminsang and Meijer. Nagtglas immediately tried to subdue the people around Fort Komenda, who had resisted Dutch rule, but only managed to escalate the situation, culminating in the hostage of several able seamen from the warship Amstel a few days later. Nagtglas was also mandated to enquire with the British about their willingness to take over the Dutch possessions on the coast, and rumours about the Dutch leaving the Gold Coast worried the people of Elmina. In June 1871, Nagtglas left the Gold Coast to recover from illness, leaving naval commander Jan Albert Hendrik Hugenholtz in charge, who himself went on sick leave to the Netherlands September 1871. Hugenholtz had appointed the naval officer Johannes Wirix as his successor, much to the dismay of the veterans of the colonial administration, who felt passed by. Eventually, Wirix was not able to gain control, and Le Jeune took over as interim governor on 28 October 1871. Le Jeune served as interim governor until lieutenant governor Jan Helenus Ferguson, who was charged by the Dutch government to effect the cession of the Dutch Gold Coast to the United Kingdom, arrived on 15 November. Le Jeune had by that time fallen ill, and went to the Netherlands on 22 November 1871 to recover.

=== First consul in Elmina ===
While in the Netherlands, Le Jeune was appointed agent of the Netherlands in Elmina, a consular position, making him among other things responsible for paying pensions to former employees of the Dutch colonial administration and to veterans of the Dutch East Indies Army. He arrived back at the Gold Coast on 28 April 1872, three weeks after lieutenant governor Ferguson had transferred Elmina to the British. On the very day of his arrival, the chairman of the committee installed to regularise the affairs of the Dutch on the Gold Coast, J.M.C.W. Joost, was shot in Elmina by an angry crowd protesting the transfer of Elmina to the British. Le Jeune then also assumed the duties of Joost, while keeping his position as agent.

Le Jeune was promoted to consul on 1 March 1873. Soon after, the tensions in Elmina would culminate in the exile of Edinahene Kobina Gyan to Sierra Leone and an attack on Elmina by the Asante, to which the British authorities responded with a bombardment of the old town of Elmina. Le Jeune retired in early 1874 and was succeeded by his vice consul Pieter Simon Hamel.

=== Later life in the Netherlands and Belgium ===
After retiring to the Netherlands, Le Jeune married Maria Auguste Lisette Luther (1843–1929), sister of the Gold Coast medical officer Friedrich Martin Luther, in Rotterdam on 17 June 1875. The couple settled in Neerbosch, now part of Nijmegen, where they had two sons and a daughter, before moving to the Brussels municipality of Schaerbeek in March 1879.

Willem Pieter Antonie Le Jeune died in the Brussels municipality of Saint-Josse-ten-Noode on 28 March 1894. The year after, on 2 September 1895, his daughter died as well, prompting his widow Maria Luther to move back to her maiden family in Rotterdam in March 1896. Maria Luther died in Rotterdam on 4 February 1929.
