= Pieter Simon Hamel =

Dutch diplomat

Consul General of the Netherlands at Amoy for Southern China and Formosa
- In office 12 March 1890 – June 1892

Consul General of the Netherlands at Bangkok
- In office 12 June 1880 – 24 June 1887
- Preceded by: J. Salmon
- Succeeded by: J.C.T. Reelfs

Consul General of the Netherlands at Elmina
- In office 15 March 1874 – 1 February 1880
- Preceded by: Willem Pieter Antonie Le Jeune
- Succeeded by: Office disestablished

Personal details
- Born: November 10, 1845 Breskens, Netherlands
- Died: October 13, 1900 (aged 54) Bendorf am Rhein, Germany
- Spouse(s): Ellen Vickerman; Maria Margaretha den Bouwmeester

Pieter Simon Hamel (10 November 1845 – 13 October 1900) was a Dutch diplomat who served as Consul General at Elmina, Bangkok and Amoy.

== Biography ==
Pieter Simon Hamel was born in Breskens in the province of Zeeland, the Netherlands, to Simon Hamel and Catharina Callandt. After gaining his teaching qualifications, he worked as a teacher in Dordrecht and Groede. In 1869, Hamel's adventurous nature led him to write his acquaintance Frederik Nagtglas, brother of Dutch Gold Coast governor Cornelis Nagtglas, to ask whether he could inquire with his brother if he could be appointed as a teacher in Elmina. Hamel was then promptly appointed as an assistant teacher at the government school in Elmina and arrived at the latter place on 13 July 1869.

Adventure rather than a passion for teaching was the primary motivation for Hamel to seek an appointment at Elmina, and governor Nagtglas, who quickly noticed that Hamel's talents could well be used elsewhere, soon gave him responsibility for the post office that was just established at Elmina as a consequence of the entry into force of the Anglo-Dutch Convention for an Interchange of Territory on the Gold Coast of Africa. Hamel was also made cashier and assistant to the bookkeeper. In the years after, he was among other things charged with performing religious services and installed as head of the tax office, as the keeper of civil records, as a translator, and as a substitute judge.

=== Start of a diplomatic career ===
After the Netherlands sold their possessions on the Gold Coast to the United Kingdom in April 1872, Hamel was employed at the consulate that the Netherlands had established at Elmina. Hamel first was appointed vice consul under consul Willem Le Jeune in 1873, before becoming acting consul on 15 March 1874, upon Le Jeune's return to the Netherlands. In May 1875, Hamel was subsequently installed as full Consul. On 5 June 1876, Hamel paid the kostgeld still due to Asantehene Mensa Bonsu for the final years of Dutch presence in Elmina. Following a European leave between November 1877 to March 1878, Hamel returned to Elmina and was awarded the personal title of Consul General.

The Netherlands had decided to keep a diplomatic post at Elmina primarily for the payment of pensions to the retired recruits of the Royal Netherlands East Indies Army. Other reasons included the safeguarding of Dutch trade interests and the exploration of the possibility to continue recruiting soldiers for the Royal Netherlands East Indies Army in Africa. Hamel especially went at great lengths in trying to negotiate a deal with an African head to recruit these soldiers: after the British abolished slavery in the Gold Coast in 1874, slaves could no longer be manumitted by the Dutch government in return for an army contract, leading Hamel to try his luck in Dahomey, Grand Bassam and Assini, which stood under French protection. Hamel undertook a mission to Krindjabo, the capital of the Kingdom of Sanwi in contemporary Côte d'Ivoire, in which he found King Amatifou sympathetic to his proposal, but unwilling to do anything without the blessing of the French. France, however, did not allow this recruitment to take place. Upon his return from European leave, Hamel tried to negotiate a deal in Liberia, an independent country not under the protection of either France or the United Kingdom, to no avail.

The Consulate General at Elmina was disbanded in February 1880. Hamel subsequently appointed Arthur Brun as honorary consul at Elmina and left the Gold Coast.

=== Consul General at Bangkok ===
Hamel was then appointed Consul General at Bangkok, where he had to take over a badly functioning consulate that was previously headed by Consul J. Salmon, who had to leave his post after suffering from a nervous breakdown. Hamel reduced the workload of the consulate by limiting the number of Chinese-Dutch citizens under its protection. On the instigation of Hamel, the consulate was upgraded to a consulate general, primarily because of the trade links of Siam with the Dutch East Indies.

In June 1887, Hamel was forced to leave his post because of failing health.

=== Consul General at Amoy ===
After three years in the Netherlands, Hamel was appointed Consul General at Amoy for Southern China and Formosa in 1890. Hamel's main task was to secure the unimpeded migration of Chinese labourers from the Southern Chinese cities to the Dutch East Indies and the other Dutch colonies. Coincidentally, the Consul General in Beijing, Hamel's direct superior, was the former Gold Coast governor Jan Helenus Ferguson.

While in Amoy, Hamel suffered two strokes, which forced him to retire. Hamel was admitted to a psychiatric hospital in Bendorf am Rhein in Germany where he died on 13 October 1900.

== Personal life ==
On the Gold Coast, Hamel had a relationship with Ellen Vickermann, with whom he had a son named George Hamel. George Hamel would eventually follow his father's footsteps and also become a diplomat.

In the Netherlands, Hamel married Maria Margaretha den Bouwmeester on 14 November 1881 in Singapore. Maria joined Hamel in Bangkok and gave birth there to a daughter named Maria Elisabeth Hamel on 30 December 1882. Maria Margaretha den Bouwmeester died in Bangkok on 20 November 1884, leaving Pieter Simon Hamel devastated.

== Decorations ==
- Order of the Crown of Siam (Commander, 1884)
