= Kobina Gyan =

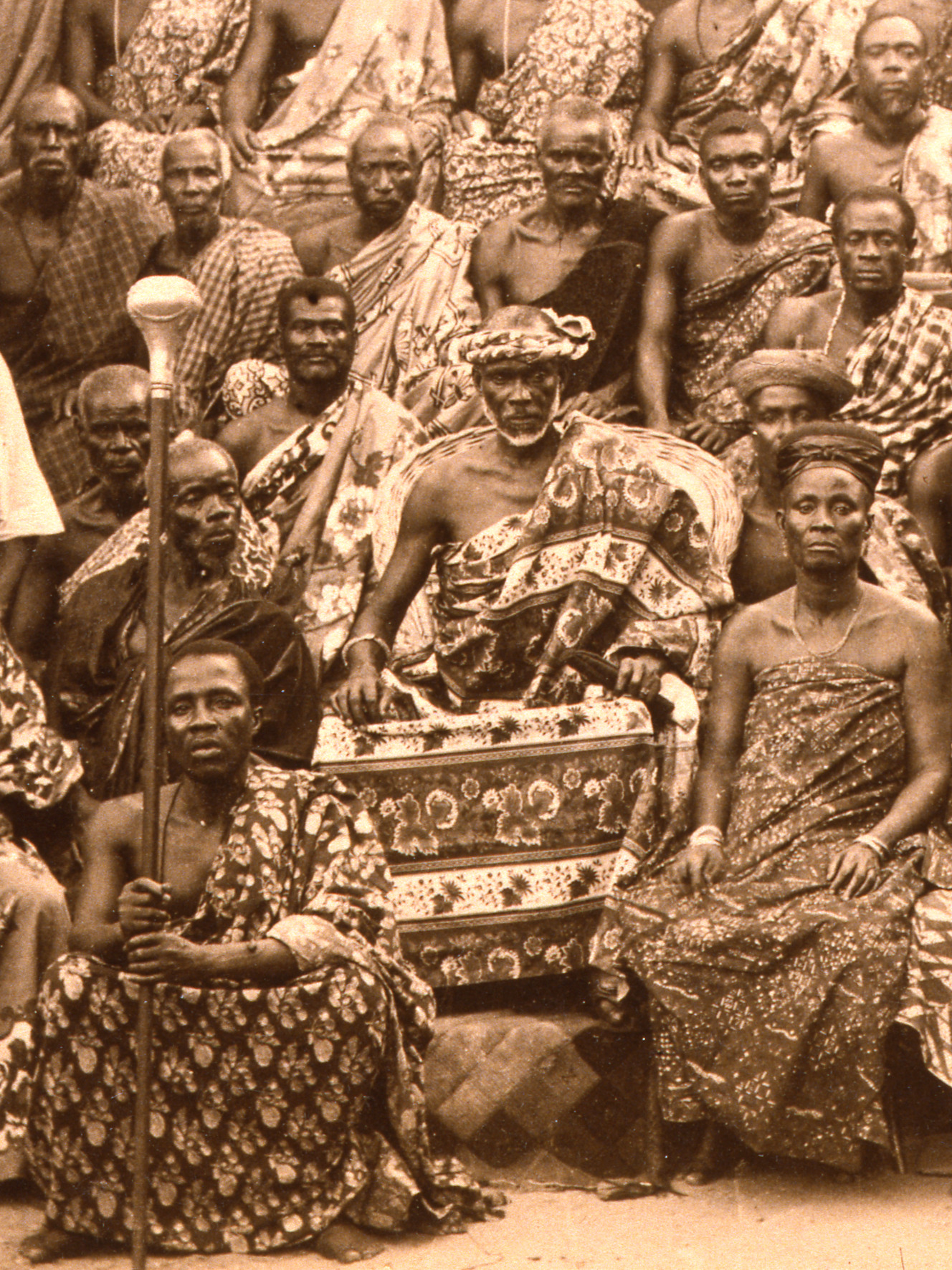
- Kobina Gyan after his return to Elmina in 1894

Edinahene
- Reign: 1894 – 1896
- Predecessor: Kweku Andoh
- Successor: Kobina Conduah II
- Reign: 1869 – 1873
- Enstoolment: 15 July 1869
- Predecessor: Kobina Conduah I
- Successor: Kofi Atta
- Born: 13 February 1821; Elmina, Dutch Gold Coast
- Died: 12 March 1896 (aged 75); Elmina, British Gold Coast

Kobina Gyan (13 February 1821 – 12 March 1896) was king or ohin of Elmina (Edinahene) between 1868 and 1873 and between 1894 and his death in 1896. Between 1873 and 1894, Kobina Gyan was exiled by the British colonial authorities for his pro-Dutch and anti-British position.

== Biography ==
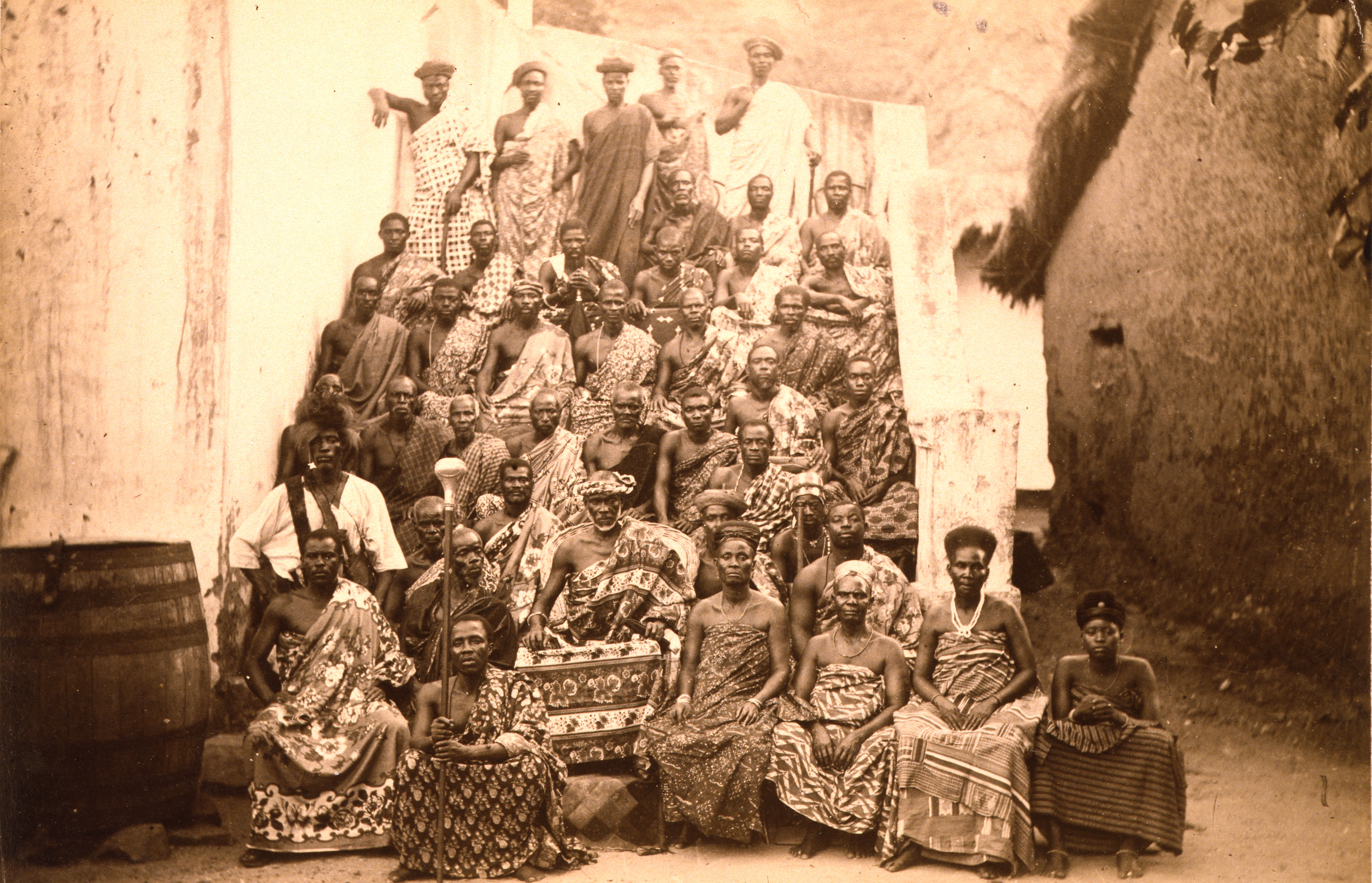
Kobina Gyan and his supporters upon his return to Elmina in 1894.

Kobina Gyan was born in Elmina to Kobina Conduah, who became Edinahene in 1863. During his father's reign, Kobina Gyan was sub-king (ohin nadir ekyen) and acted as a prominent spokesperson for the Elmina community. When the enforcement of the 1867 Anglo-Dutch Convention for an Interchange of Territory on the Gold Coast of Africa resulted in a siege of Elmina by the Fante Confederacy, Kobina Gyan co-authored the August 1868 petition to king William III of the Netherlands, asking him for help and assistance.

After his father was destooled in January 1869 for not opposing Dutch governor George Pieter Willem Boers's way of dealing with the siege of Elmina strongly enough, Kobina Gyan was enstooled on 15 July 1869 to succeed him. During his rule, Kobina Gyan initially relied on the support and advice of the wealthy and educated Elmina trader George Emil Eminsang. Both initially opposed the cession of the Dutch possessions on the Gold Coast to the British, which was being negotiated at the time. When it became apparent that the cession would go through, the Realpolitiker Eminsang offered his services to the British authorities taking over, while the idealist Kobina Gyan continued to oppose British rule.

When the Dutch Lieutenant Governor Jan Helenus Ferguson arrived in November 1871 to effect the cession of the Dutch possessions to the British, he deposed Kobina Gyan. After Elmina was turned over to the British on 6 April 1872, and angry mobs went after George Emil Eminsang, the British colonial authorities saw no other way of establishing control rather than to work together with Kobina Gyan, who was reinstated as Edinahene by governor John Pope Hennessy on 8 May 1872.

Kobina Gyan never flew the English flag given to him by Pope Hennessy and refused British payment of kostgeld. The new British governor Robert William Harley decided to test Kobina Gyan's loyalty by requesting him to take an oath of allegiance to the British on 12 March 1873. When Kobina Gyan refused, he was arrested and taken by boat to Cape Coast, before being exiled to Sierra Leone.

Kobina Gyan's exile would last 21 years. With the assistance of Elmina District Commissioner Hendrik Vroom, who collected him from Sierra Leone, Kobina Gyan again set foot on Elminan soil on 17 May 1894 and was again proclaimed king. Less than two years later, on 12 March 1896, Kobina Gyan died. He was buried in the Dutch Cemetery of Elmina.

== Legacy ==
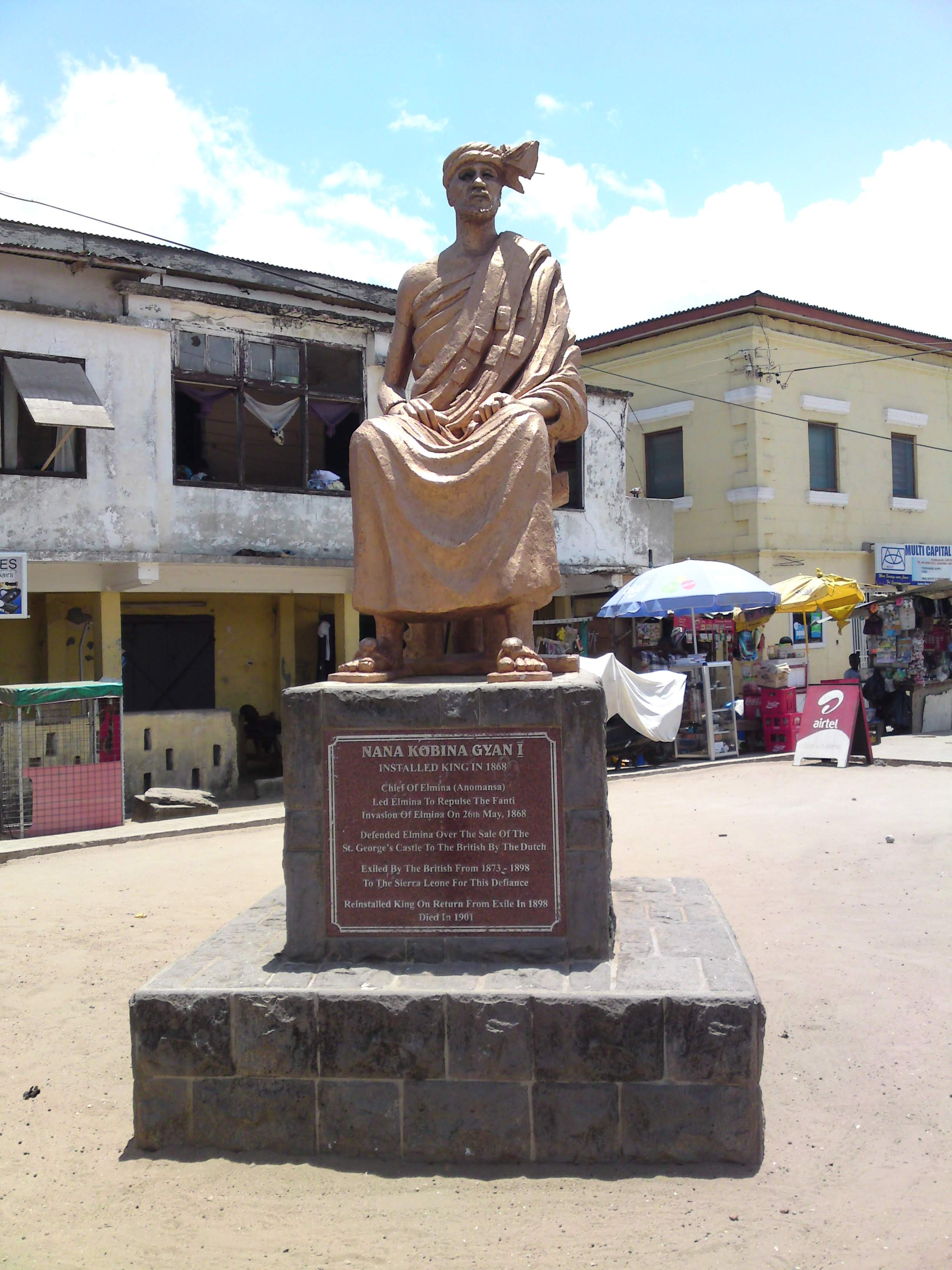
Statue of Kobina Gyan in Elmina. Note that the dates on the inscription are not correct.

Kobina Gyan is remembered as a principled king who stood up for his people. In May 2005, Elmina's Trafalgar Square was renamed Kobina Gyan square, and a statue of Kobina Gyan was unveiled at the centre.

== In fiction ==
The South African author Manu Herbstein published a fictionalised account of the transfer of Elmina to the British in 2014, which centres on a (fictional) fifteen year-old nephew of Kobina Gyan as The Boy who Spat in Sargrenti's Eye. Sargrenti is the local name for Sir Garnet Wolseley, 1st Viscount Wolseley.
