= Robert Patrick Baffour =

Ghanaian academic and engineer

R. P. Baffour OBE, OV

Vice Chancellor of the Kwame Nkrumah University of Science and Technology
- In office 1961–1967
- Preceded by: New Position
- Succeeded by: Emmanuel Evans-Anfom

Personal details
- Born: 14 May 1912 Elmina
- Died: 6 June 1993 (aged 81) Elmina
- Children: Fritz Baffour
- Education: Mfantsipim School; Achimota College; University of London
- Profession: Academic; Engineer

Robert Patrick Baffour, OBE, OV (born 14 May 1912 – 6 June 1993), was a Ghanaian engineer, politician and university administrator who served as the first Vice Chancellor of the Kwame Nkrumah University of Science and Technology (KNUST). He was also a pioneer in engineering education in Ghana.

== Early life and education ==
Robert Patrick Baffour (a.k.a. Papa Andoh) was born on 14 May 1912 in Elmina. His father was in the service of the British Civil Service in Nigeria as a Master of Schools. He was the first-born son of Robert Patrick Baffour Andoh and Maria Frederica Adwoa Kane (Okai).

His paternal grandfather was the illustrious Chief Kweku Andoh of Elmina who served in Sir Garnet Wolseley's military campaign against Prempeh I, King of the Ashanti. He was made regent of Edina State upon the expulsion of Chief Kobina Gyan by the British. Baffour's paternal grandmother was the eldest daughter of Yaa Na Yakubu I of the Dagomba tribe named Napari. She was rescued from the Ashanti by Chief Andoh during the campaign against Prempeh and was given the name Efua Yendi. She was also known as Nana Awuyea.

His maternal grandfather was Chief Nii Kofi Okai of the Gbese quarter, Accra, who was commonly known as Joseph H. Kane. He had a career as a scholar and a merchant. Baffour was also a great-grandson of George Emil Eminsang, who was the very first Western-educated lawyer on the Gold Coast.

Between 1917 and 1926, Baffour attended various schools in Ghana and Nigeria: Catholic School in Elmina, Okar Government School in Nigeria and the Richmond College.

Baffour attended the Mfantsipim School and obtained the Cambridge Senior School Certificate with exemption from London Matriculation. After secondary school, he achieved the singular honour of coming first in the Civil Service Examination of his time. Yet instead of joining the British Civil Service, he chose to continue his education at Achimota College to study engineering, where he was taught by Charles Deakin, a founding engineering instructor at the school. He became the first Ghanaian to obtain a University of London degree in mechanical engineering on Ghanaian soil.

== Career ==
=== Engineering and public service ===
Baffour began his career with the Gold Coast Railways and later became a lecturer of engineering at Achimota School. Among his inventions and innovations were the 'Descender gear’, an anti-slipping device for locomotives, '250 classes locomotive' and a navigational clockwork device for aircraft.

He also held several administrative posts in the civil service, among them that of Principal Secretary of the Ministry of Transport and Communication. He was instrumental in the selection of the sites for the Akosombo Dam, the planning and expansion of the Tema city and Harbour, the Elmina Fishing Harbour Project in addition to the founding of the Nautical College and the Black Star Line. When Baffour worked at the Accra City Council, he was involved in automobile design, specifically the 'Ewurakua' and 'King Kong' cars. He was also involved in the planning of the Kaneshie Estates using pre-fabricated building technology.

During his career, Baffour held several distinguished posts, including as chairman of the Integrated Iron & Steel Commission and the first chairman of the Ghana Atomic Energy Board. He was a driving force in the fundraising for the Opon Manse Steel Works.

He was the instigator of the Kwabenya Nuclear Plant project that was halted, six months from completion, by the military coup against Kwame Nkrumah. In 1962, Baffour was elected president of the 6th regular session of the General Conference of the International Atomic Energy Agency (IAEA).

=== Vice-chancellor ===
Eventually during the Nkrumah regime, he was the principal actor in transforming the then Kumasi College of Technology into the Kwame Nkrumah University of Science and Technology in 1960, becoming its first vice-chancellor in 1961. Baffour served as vice-chancellor of KNUST from 1961 to 1967. This was after he had served in the capacity of principal of the university's predecessor from 1960 to 1961.

=== Politics ===
He was anointed by Nkrumah to be his successor. Unfortunately, however, after disagreement with other party members, Baffour was expelled from the party. In 1979, he ran as an independent candidate in the presidential election.

=== Arts and culture ===
He was one of the sponsors of the national team to the 1952 Summer Olympics, organised in Helsinki. An aficionado of the arts, he was involved in film-making, particularly, “A Day in the life of an African” produced by the British Broadcasting Corporation as well as “Progress in Kojokrom” ( a film which was exhibited throughout the Gold Coast. These made people aware of the recent change in local government) and ”The Boy Kumasenu”. In his hometown, Elmina, he organised the festivals, Edina Korye Kuw and the Edina Mpuntu Fekuw. He captained the Number Seven Asafo Company, Nyampafo. Later in life, he practised homeopathic medicine as an amateur.

== Awards and honours ==
He was awarded the OBE in the Queen's Coronation Honours in 1953. In 1979, the Ghanaian government invested him with the Order of the Volta. The KNUST decorated him with an honorary doctorate in science.

== Personal life ==
His son, Fritz Baffour, a journalist and communication consultant served a Member of Parliament from 2009 to 2016 and the Minister for Information in 2012 under the National Democratic Congress.

== Death ==
R. P. Baffour died in Elmina of natural causes on 6 June 1993, aged 81 years. He was buried in the Dutch cemetery of Elmina.
