= George Emil Eminsang =

Ghanaian lawyer

Consul of the Netherlands at Elmina
- acting
- In office 1878–1879
- Preceded by: Pieter Simon Hamel
- Succeeded by: Pieter Simon Hamel

Personal details
- Born: ca. 1833 Elmina, Dutch Gold Coast
- Died: May 1898 Elmina, British Gold Coast

George Emil Eminsang (ca. 1833 – May 1898) was a prominent Euro-African merchant and political leader on the Gold Coast, who played a prominent role in the last years of Dutch colonial rule on the Gold Coast. After the Dutch Gold Coast was transferred to the United Kingdom, Eminsang became a diplomat for the Netherlands and later for the United States and the Congo Free State. Together with James Bannerman Hyde and James Hutton Brew, Eminsang was one of the first so-called "country lawyers" on the Gold Coast.

Eminsang was an important leader of the No. 10 Akrampafo asafo ward of Elmina and owner of the most famous hotel of Elmina, St. George's Hotel. Besides his native Fanti language , he spoke and wrote Dutch, English, Portuguese and German.

== Biography ==
=== Early life and early career ===
Eminsang was born in Elmina to Joseph Emil Eminsang, a merchant and innkeeper, and an unknown lady from a prominent Dutch/Fanti Euro-African family. He was educated in the Netherlands and Germany, before returning to teach for several years at the Dutch government school of Elmina, where he had completed his primary education.

In the 1850s, Eminsang established himself as a merchant on the Gold Coast. In 1859, while doing business in Kumasi, Eminsang had a conflict with the Asante chief Kwasi Brantuo, whose porters lost five textiles from a shipment Eminsang had ordered from Anomabu. Asantehene Kwaku Dua I Panyin ruled in favour of Eminsang and ordered that Brantuo pay 15 Engels compensation to Eminsang. Eminsang still refused to pay the wages of the porters, however, leading Brantuo to complain to Asante chief Akyempon Yaw, who regulated Elmina affairs in Kumasi. The conflict became so heated that the Dutch agent in Kumasi, Pieter de Heer, offered to pay Eminsang's debt from his own pocket, but Eminsang flatly refused and swore a Coromantee oath that no payment would take place. After Eminsang started to insult the Asantehene, he was arrested and imprisoned. Eventually, Pieter de Heer managed to persuade Asantehene Kwaku Dua to release Eminsang to send him for trial by the Dutch governor in Elmina.

=== Role in the transfer of the Dutch Gold Coast to Britain ===
Eminsang played a prominent role in colonial affairs in the last years of Dutch rule on the Gold Coast, working closely together with Kobina Gyan, first sub-king and later king of Elmina, to press for Dutch support. When in 1868 the Fante Confederacy tried to take Elmina in the aftermath of the redistribution of Dutch and British forts on the Gold Coast, Eminsang was sent by the Elmina government to the Netherlands to plead the case for Elmina with Minister of the Colonies Engelbertus de Waal. After meeting with Eminsang, De Waal proceeded in replacing governor George Pieter Willem Boers with the experienced former governor Cornelis Nagtglas, who as a government commissioner was tasked with finding a solution for the conflict with the Fante.

Eminsang travelled back to the Gold Coast on the same ship that carried Nagtglas there. Upon arrival, Nagtglas appointed Eminsang as a member of the Colonial Council of the Dutch Gold Coast. When it became apparent that the Dutch were negotiating a treaty to transfer their possessions on the Gold Coast to the United Kingdom, Eminsang led the attempts by the Elminese to stop the transfer, and together with other Dutch loyalists paid for a visit to The Hague by David Mill Graves, in an ultimate attempt to stop the ratification of the treaty. Eminsang wrote a letter to the German ambassador in The Hague asking German Emperor William I for mediation and protection, to be handed over by Mill Graves.

After it became clear that Mill Graves's mission could not prevent the handing over of Elmina to the British, Eminsang withdrew his protest, keen on keeping his influential positions in the colonial government. Apart from being a member of the Colonial Council of the Dutch Gold Coast, Eminsang had also become a substitute judge on the Court of Justice, a sworn attorney, and a justice of the Small Causes Court. Eminsang's volte face proved very worthwhile for him, as he was appointed member of the Committee for the Regularisation of the Affairs of the Netherlands on the Coast of Guinea headed by J. M. C. W. Joost, as well as notary and public registrar.

When Elmina was finally transferred to the British on 6 April, the British Governor of the Gold Coast John Pope Hennessy appointed Eminsang Civil Commandant, Collector of Customs, Postmaster and Deputy Superintendent of Police. As it appeared that Eminsang was rewarded for his sudden change of opinion, many Elminese grew angry with the situation. On 26 April, people from various asafo wards, mainly numbers 6, 7 and 8, marched with muskets, knives and Dutch flags to Eminsang's house, where a meeting was held between the Regularisation Committee and colonel De Haes, the Dutch military officer who had been entrusted with effecting the transfer of sovereignty. An altercation followed on the streets and eventually shots were fired, which hit J. M. C. W. Joost, who died of his wounds the next day.

Eminsang could no longer remain in Elmina and fled to Cape Coast. He was released of his duties to the Regularisation Committee by colonel De Haes on 30 April. Eminsang later returned to Elmina, however, and served as acting consul of the Netherlands in Elmina in 1878 and 1879 during the absence of Pieter Simon Hamel, and as consul to the Congo and the United States in Cape Coast in 1890.

== Reputation ==
In the preface of his book Fanti Customary Laws, John Mensah Sarbah wrote:

Dear Mr. Eminsang, — Pardon the liberty I take in sending you this open letter, with this my first attempt in the Thorny paths of literature. I dare do so, for not only you are a Native of the soil and one of my father's friends, but also the senior member of the Bar of the Western Province of the Supreme Court of the Gold Coast, having commenced to practice when we, who are now members thereof, were but schoolboys.

— John Mensah Sarbah, Law Courts

== Personal life ==
Eminsang had at least three children with Anna Abraba Smith. One of them, Marianne Eminsang (about 1859–1915), was grandmother to Robert Patrick Baffour. Anna Abraba Smith previously had a child with Cornelis Nagtglas.

Eminsang married Mary Ellen De Lyons on 14 April 1860 at the American Episcopal Church in Harper, Liberia. She however abandoned him for the British colonial administrator Herbert Taylor Ussher. Eminsang then tried to indict Ussher for fornication and adultery at the Cape Coast court of justice, but after this attempt failed he decided to divorce De Lyons. The divorce was finalised on 11 September 1867.

Eminsang also had a child with Sarah Rühle and a son with a woman named Adayesa.
