= Jules van den Bossche =

Dutch military officer and colonial government official

Jules Félicien Romain Stanislas van den Bossche

Member of the Council of the Dutch East Indies
- In office 24 April 1868 – January 1871
- Governor General: Pieter Mijer

Governor of the West Coast of Sumatra
- In office 6 November 1862 – 28 July 1868
- Governors General: Pieter Mijer; L. A. J. W. Sloet van de Beele
- Preceded by: Cornelis Albert de Brauw
- Succeeded by: Nicolaas Anne Theodoor Arriëns

Resident of Besuki
- In office 1861–1862
- Preceded by: Hendricus Albertus van der Poel
- Succeeded by: Petrus Theodorus Couperus

Resident of Bangka
- In office 1859–1861

Governor of the Dutch Gold Coast
- In office 29 April 1857 – 9 September 1857
- Monarch: William III of the Netherlands
- Preceded by: Willem George Frederik Derx
- Succeeded by: Cornelis Nagtglas

Assistant Resident of Tebing Tinggi
- In office 1852–1857

Personal details
- Born: 4 September 1819 Mons, United Kingdom of the Netherlands
- Died: 12 January 1889 (aged 69) Aden, Yemen

Jules Félicien Romain Stanislas van den Bossche (born 4 September 1819 – 12 January 1889) was a Dutch military officer and colonial government official. He was governor of the Dutch Gold Coast between 1857 and 1858 and member of the Council of the Dutch East Indies, the government of the Governor-General of the Dutch East Indies.

== Biography ==
Van den Bossche was born in Mons, which was then situated in the United Kingdom of the Netherlands, to Jean Bernard van den Bossche and Marie Cathérine Navéau. He moved to the Dutch East Indies at age two, when his father was appointed President of the Orphans' and Probate Court of Surabaya.

Van den Bossche joined the Dutch East Indies Army and later made a career in the colonial government of the Dutch East Indies, becoming a clerk in the office of the assistant resident of Pontianak and later in the office of the resident at Palembang. While stationed at the latter place, he was promoted to controller and took part in the Palembang Highlands Expeditions. Between 1852 and 1857, Van den Bossche served as assistant resident in Tebing Tinggi.

When he was on home leave in the Netherlands in 1857, Van den Bossche was appointed governor of the Dutch Gold Coast, where he only served for four months. He returned to the colonial administration of the Dutch East Indies in 1859, serving as resident of consecutively Bangka Island and Besuki, before becoming governor of Sumatra's West Coast in late 1862. In 1868, he was appointed a member of the Council of the Dutch East Indies, the cabinet of the Governor-General of the Dutch East Indies.

Van den Bossche retired from service in 1871, and lived his later years in The Hague. Together with several Dutch partners, he involved himself in private business in the Dutch East Indies. While on his way to oversee the building and exploitation of a coal mine and railway line in Central Sumatra, he died aboard the French mail ship Djemnah near Aden, Yemen. According to some sources, he was designated to succeed Henri Maximiliaan Andrée Wiltens as vice-president of the Council of the Dutch East Indies upon arrival.

== Colonial collecting ==
Van den Bossche collected natural history specimens for the Rijksmuseum van Natuurlijke Historie in the places where he was stationed. He also gifted 59 objects of colonial provenance to king William III.

Van den Bossche was chairman of the colonial division of the Dutch submission to the 1889 Paris Exposition when he died.

== Personal life ==
Van den Bossche never married, but had children with at least five women. In Batavia he fathered Julie Clementine van den Bossche (1842–1896) with a woman named Kendo. While assistant resident of Tebing Tinggi, he fathered Victor Albert van den Bossche (1853–1916) and Marie Eugenie van den Bossche (1855–1940) with a woman named Badima, whom he legally recognized as his. Marie Eugenie van den Bossche would later marry the Dutch painter Evert Pieters. During this time he also fathered Albert Felix van den Bossche (1853) with an unknown woman.

During his service on the Gold Coast between 1857 and 1858, he fathered a son named John van den Bossche.

After his return to the Dutch East Indies in 1858, he fathered Albertine Felicie van den Bossche (1861) with an unknown woman.

== Publications ==
- Oendang-oendang simboer tjahaja Palembang (1852–1854)
- Over eenige vischsoorten van het eiland Bangka, het Rijks Museum van Natuurlijke Historie te Leiden aangeboden (1863)
- Gewijzigde concessie-aanvrage voor den aanleg van spoorwegen en voor kolen-ontginning in Midden-Sumatra (with Jacob Karel Willem Quarles van Ufford, 1883)

== Decorations ==
- Order of the Netherlands Lion (1852, Knight)
- Military William Order (1850, Knight 4th Class)
