= Hendrick Vroom =

Hendrick Vroom can refer to:

- Hendrick Cornelisz Vroom, Dutch painter
- Hendrik Vroom, Gold Coast colonial official and businessman
