= Dutch Cemetery, Elmina =

Cemetery in Elmina, Ghana

Dutch Cemetery
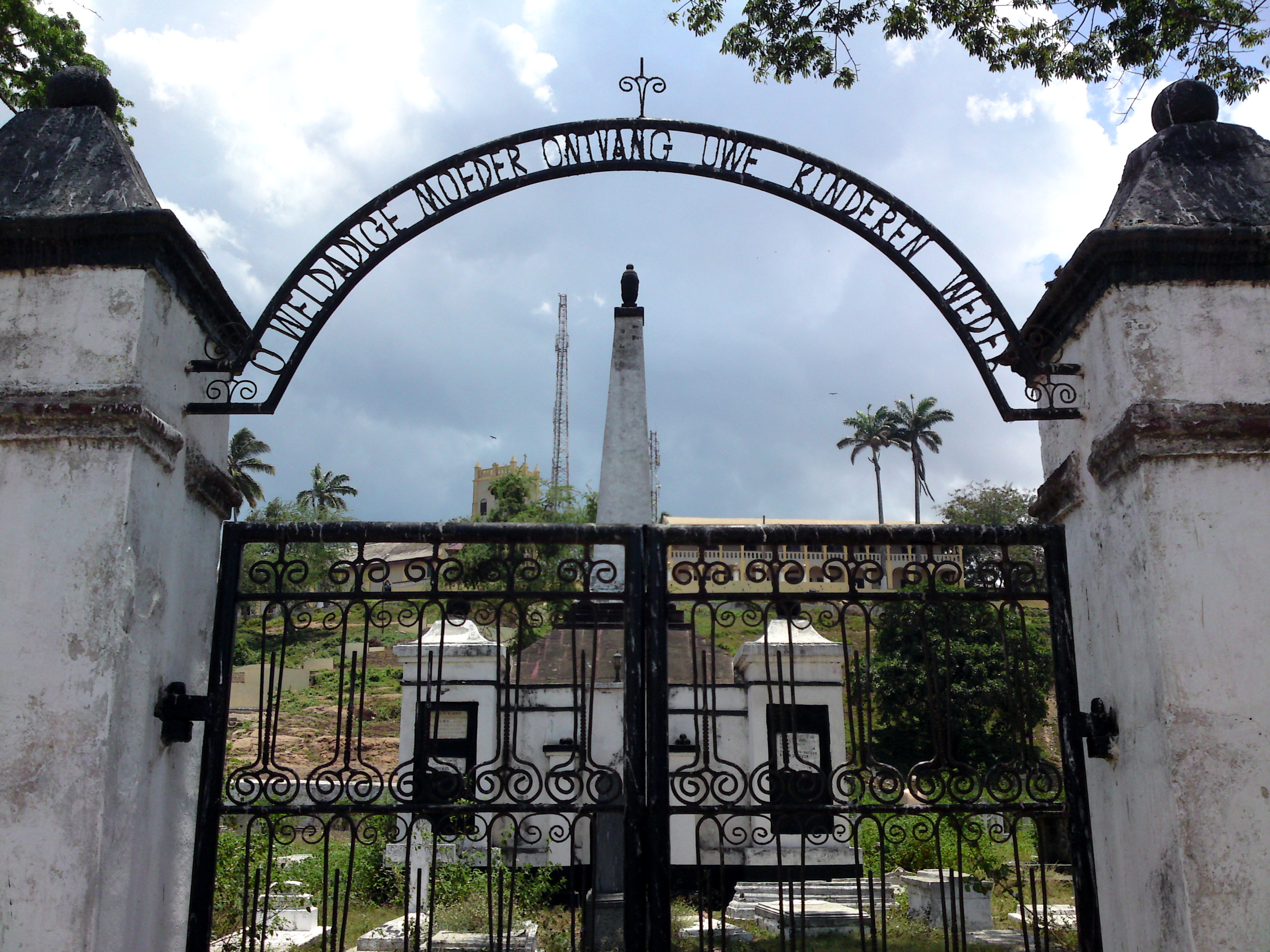
- Gate of the cemetery with the Dutch inscription: "O weldadige moeder, ontvang uwe kinderen weder"

Details
- Established: 1806
- Location: Elmina
- Country: Ghana
- Coordinates: 5.0860°N 1.3530°W
- Type: Public, non-denominational
- No. of interments: ca. 70

The Dutch Cemetery of Elmina was constructed on the order of Governor of the Dutch Gold Coast Johannes Petrus Hoogenboom in 1806. Up until that date, the Dutch had buried their dead inside or just outside Elmina Castle, but by the beginning of the 19th century, little space was left there, so it was decided to construct a new cemetery in what was known as "the Garden" of Elmina. Ironically, Governor Hoogenboom was also one of the first people to be interred in the cemetery, after he was murdered by local Elminese people with whom he had a disagreement.

== Overview ==
In the middle of the cemetery, a large tomb is situated in which the most prominent people were buried, including governor-general Herman Willem Daendels, acting commander Johannes Oosthout, acting commander Eduard Daniel Leopold van Ingen, and governor Anthony van der Eb. Other people buried in the cemetery include Carel Hendrik Bartels, R. P. Baffour, Chief Kweku Andoh, and Elmina King Nana Kobina Gyan.

=== Renovation ===
The cemetery was renovated in 2006, as part of the Elmina 2015 Strategy. The reconstruction was funded by the Dutch embassy. Among other things, the gate was restored, and the inscription reading "O weldadige moeder, ontvang uwe kinderen weder" (English translation: Oh benevolent mother, receive your children once again) was put into place again. A plaque unveiled on 24 July 2006 by Dutch ambassador to Ghana Arie van der Wiel and Komenda/Edina/Eguafo/Abirem Municipal District Chief Executive George Frank Asmah remembers this renovation.

== Gallery ==
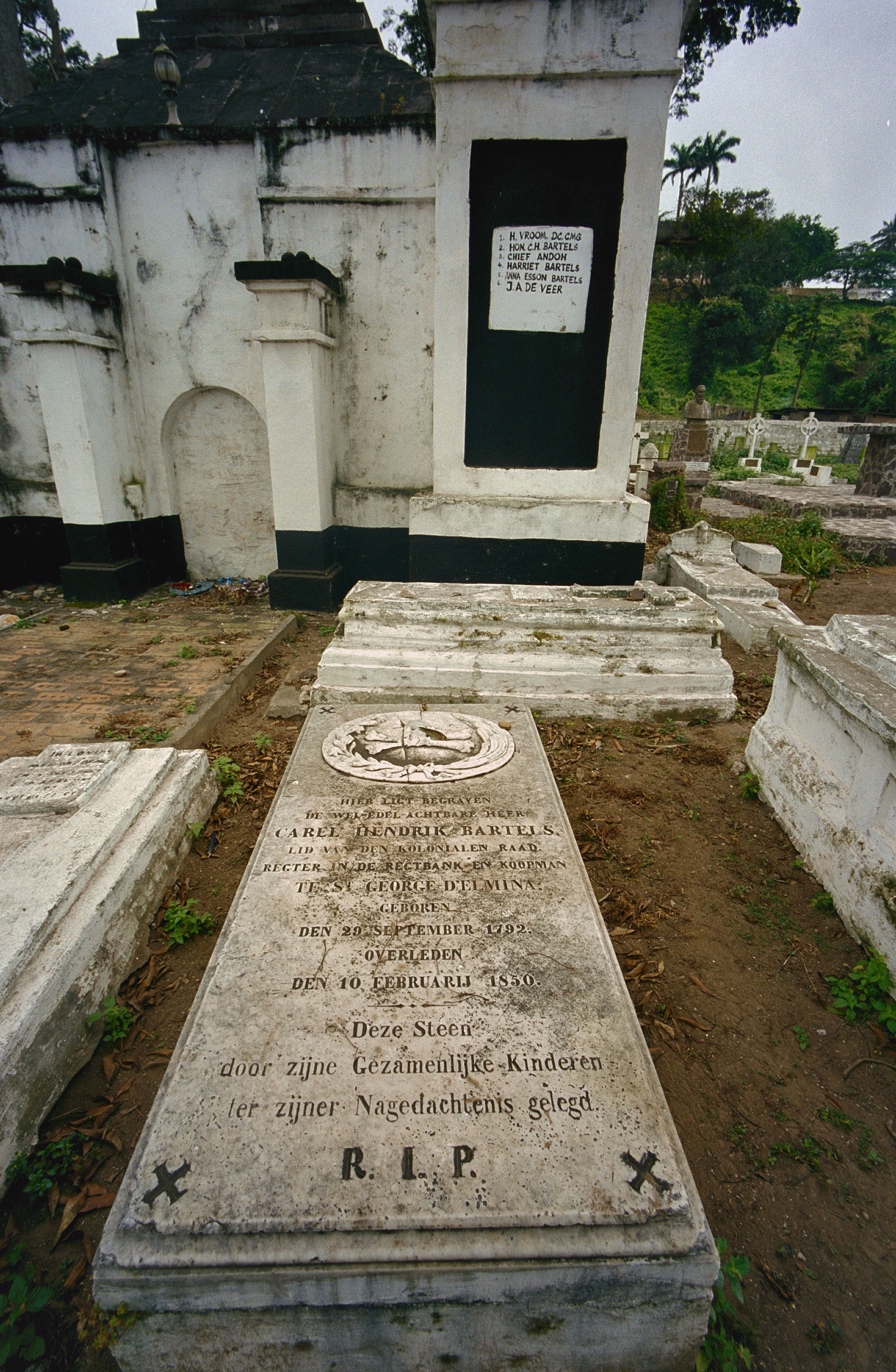
Grave of Carel Hendrik Bartels

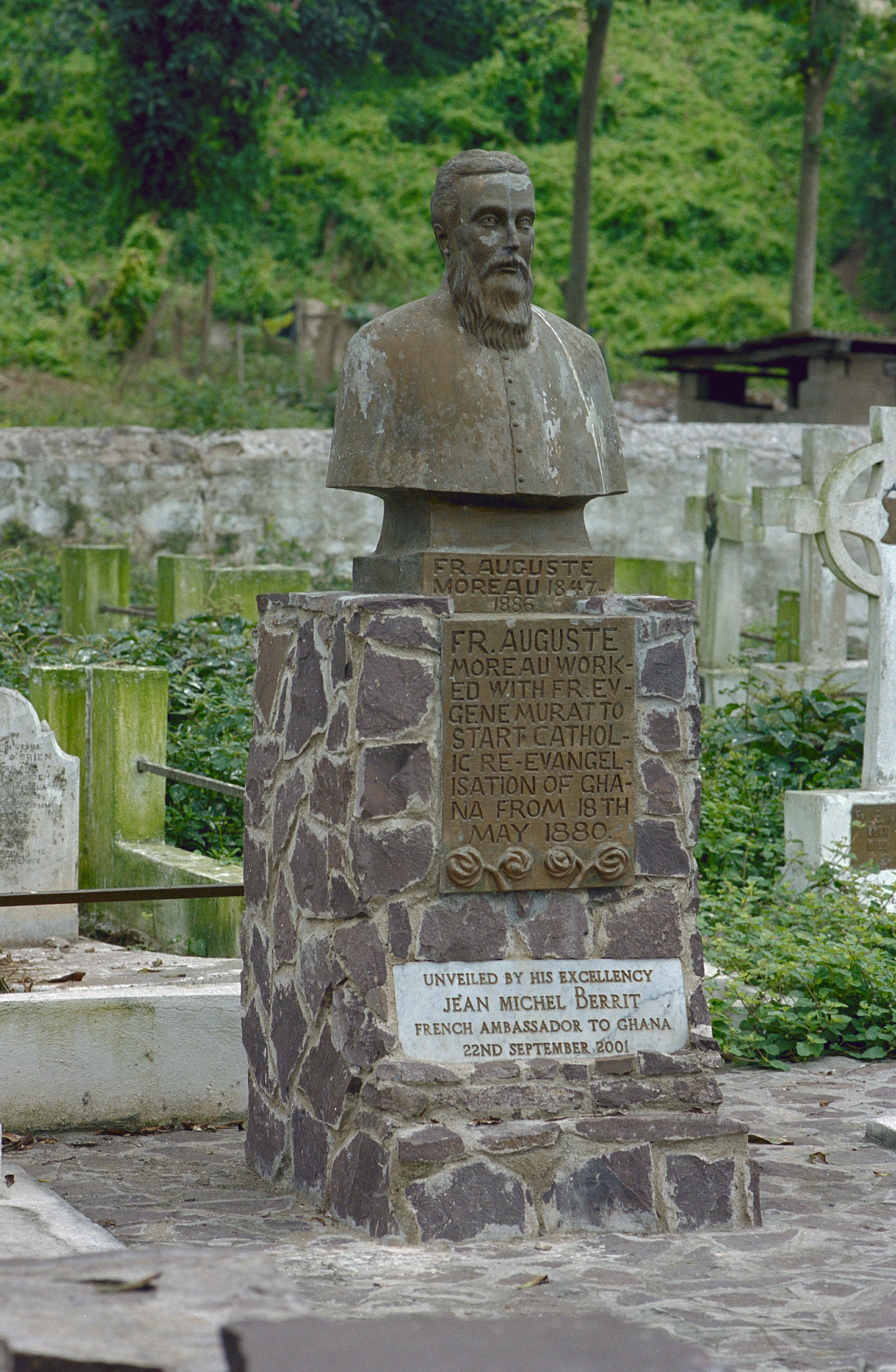
Statue of Fr. Auguste Moreau

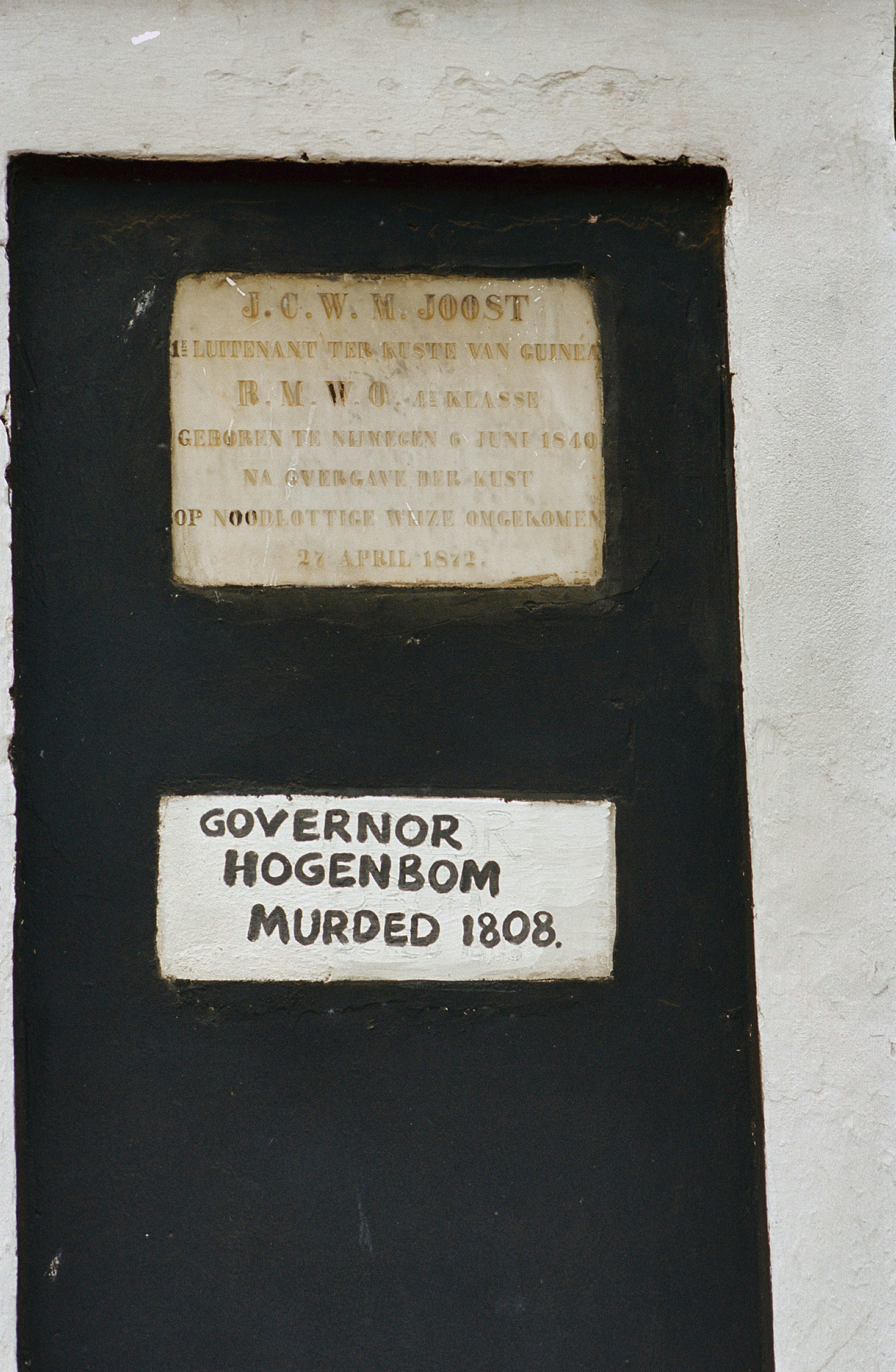
Plaques on the tomb remembering Governor Hoogenboom (misspelled) and lieutenant Joost

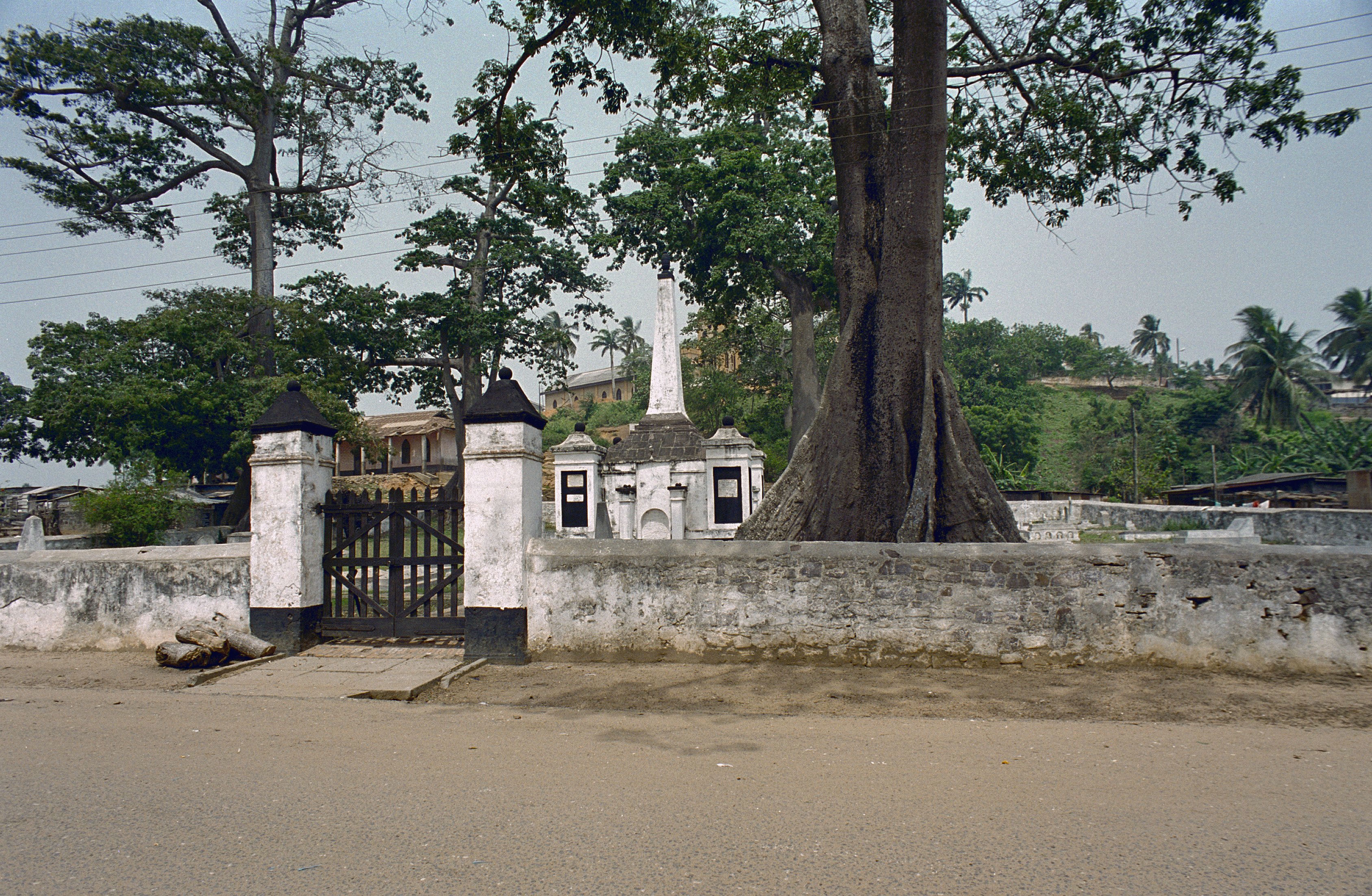
Cemetery gate before renovation
