= Jan Helenus Ferguson =

Dutch colonial government official and diplomat

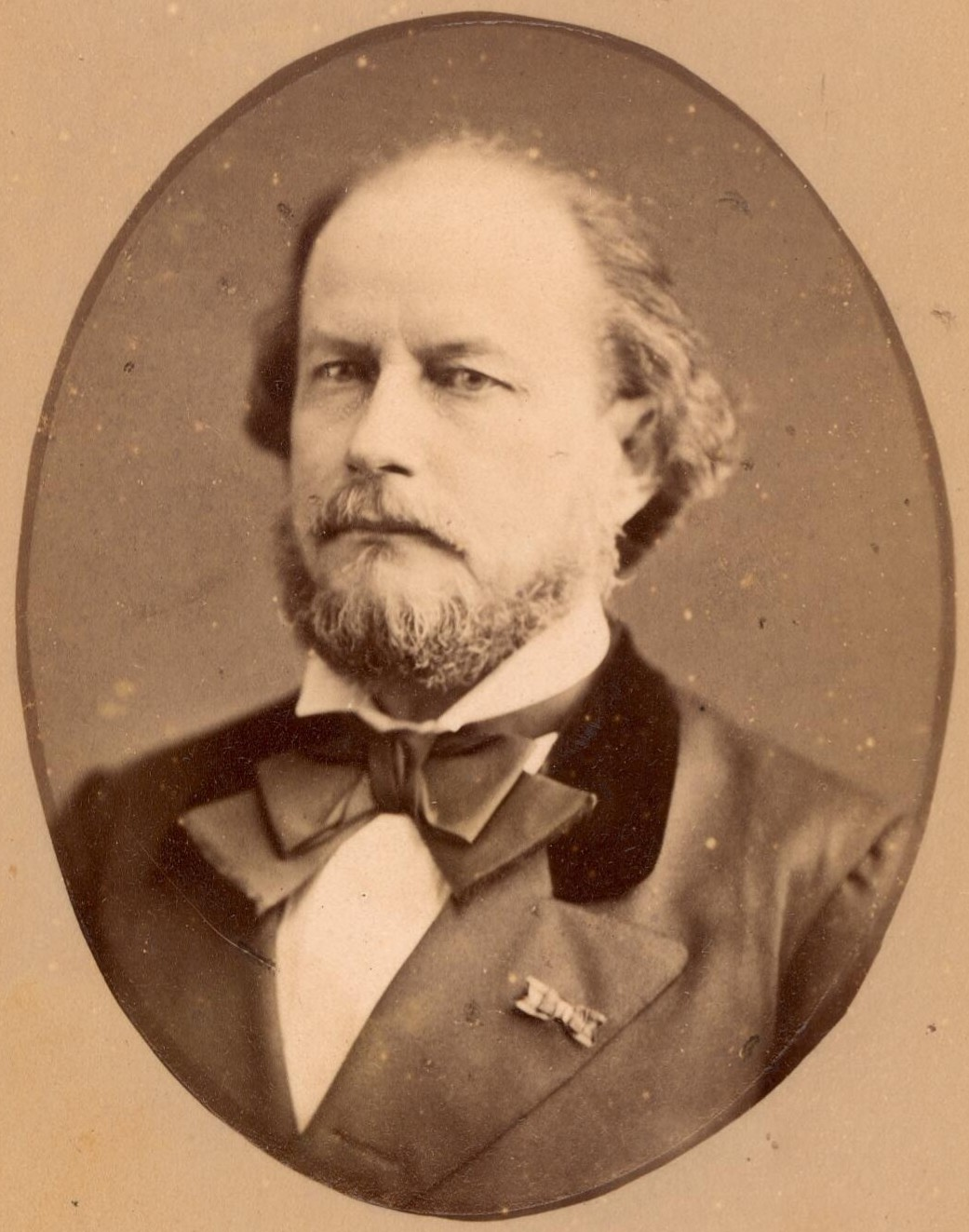

Consul General and Minister Resident of the Netherlands at Beijing for China
- In office 1872–1894
- Preceded by: none
- Succeeded by: F.M. Knöbel

Luitenant Governor of the Dutch Gold Coast
- In office 15 November 1871 – 6 April 1872
- Monarch: William III of the Netherlands
- Preceded by: Jan Albert Hendrik Hugenholtz
- Succeeded by: none

Personal details
- Born: 19 May 1826 Curaçao
- Died: 13 April 1908 (aged 81) Padang, Dutch East Indies
- Spouse(s): Maria Eleanor Waymouth; Maria Margaretha de Jong

Jan Helenus Ferguson (born 19 May 1826 – 13 April 1908) was a Dutch colonial government official and diplomat, who made a career in the administration of the Dutch West Indies and the Dutch Gold Coast before becoming consul general of the Netherlands to China. Ferguson also authored several works on international law, sociology and philosophy.

== Biography ==
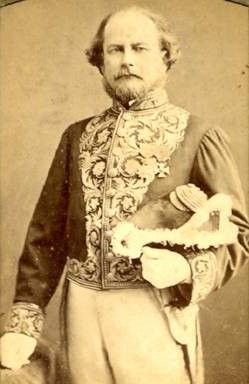
Portrait of Jan Helenus Ferguson in uniform.

Jan Helenus Ferguson was born on the Caribbean island of Curaçao to Jonathan Ferguson from Amsterdam and Helena Elizabeth Martijn from Curaçao. He initially made a career in the colonial administration of the Dutch Caribbean islands, becoming lieutenant governor of Aruba in 1866. He was appointed lieutenant governor of Bonaire in June 1871, but never took office as the Dutch government needed someone to hand over the Dutch Gold Coast to the British in 1872 after governor Cornelis Nagtglas had left the colony.

After the Dutch flag was lowered for the last time in Elmina on 6 April 1872, Ferguson was appointed consul general of the Netherlands in China. He lived and worked in Chefoo, Hong Kong and Beijing, before retiring to the Netherlands in 1895. He then lived in Wageningen and Amsterdam. He died in Padang, Dutch East Indies in 1908.

Ferguson was a member of the Institut de Droit International. His main publication as an international lawyer was his 'Manual of international law for the use of navies, colonies and consulates' (1884), which was even translated into Chinese. He was awarded recognition by the Chinese emperor in the same year as an officer in the Order of the Double Dragon.

== Personal life ==
Ferguson married Maria Eleanor Waymouth (1844–1891) from Antigua on 22 December 1859 in Philipsburg, Sint Maarten. They had thirteen children. After his wife died at the age of 46, he married Maria Margaretha de Jong on 15 September 1899.

== Publications ==
- The Red Cross alliance at sea (1871);
- Manual of international law for the use of navies, colonies and consulates (1884);
- De zeden wet der natuur en haar invloed op de ontwikkeling der staatsvormen (1886);
- The philosophy of civilization, a sociological study (1889) (translated into Dutch as De wetten der maatschappelijke ontwikkeling, met een voorrede van W.H. de Beaufort (1893));
- Jurisdiction et exterritorialité en Chine (1890);
- Het bimetallisme en de jongste muntverordening van Britsch Indië, eene schets op het gebied der staathuishoudkunde (1894);
- The international conference of the Hague, a plea for peace in social evolution (1899);
- Het kenvermogen van het medegevoel, het instinct van den mensch, verklarende het verband der natuurkrachten met de in den mensch gestelde geestesverwerking, voor de wetenschappelijke beschouwing van het idealisme, het spiritisme en aanverwante voorstellingen in verband met galvanisme, magnetisme, electriciteit en andere etheresche stroomen, tusschen persoonlijke menschelijke geesten met lichamen daarbuiten, onderling (1908).
