= Johannes Wirix =

Dutch naval officer

Governor of the Dutch Gold Coast
- ad interim
- In office 17 September 1871 – 28 October 1871
- Monarch: William III of the Netherlands
- Preceded by: Jan Albert Hendrik Hugenholtz
- Succeeded by: Willem Le Jeune

Personal details
- Born: 7 November 1836 Muiden, Netherlands
- Died: 30 December 1917 (aged 81) Haarlem, Netherlands
- Spouse: Wilhelmina Petronella Regina Bremmer

Johannes Marinus Ludovicus Adrianus Petrus Wirix (born 7 November 1836 – 30 December 1917) was a Dutch naval officer, who had been commander of the Royal Netherlands Navy on the Dutch Gold Coast since 26 July 1871, and who was appointed interim governor by the previous interim governor Jan Albert Hendrik Hugenholz on 17 September 1871. His appointment proved highly controversial with the other colonial administrators on the Gold Coast, who felt passed by. Wirix resigned on 28 October 1871, leaving the interim governorship to the long-time Gold Coast administrator Willem Le Jeune.
