= Dutch government school of Elmina =

Dutch government school during the colonial rule

Dutch government school of Elmina Gouvernementsschool van Elmina
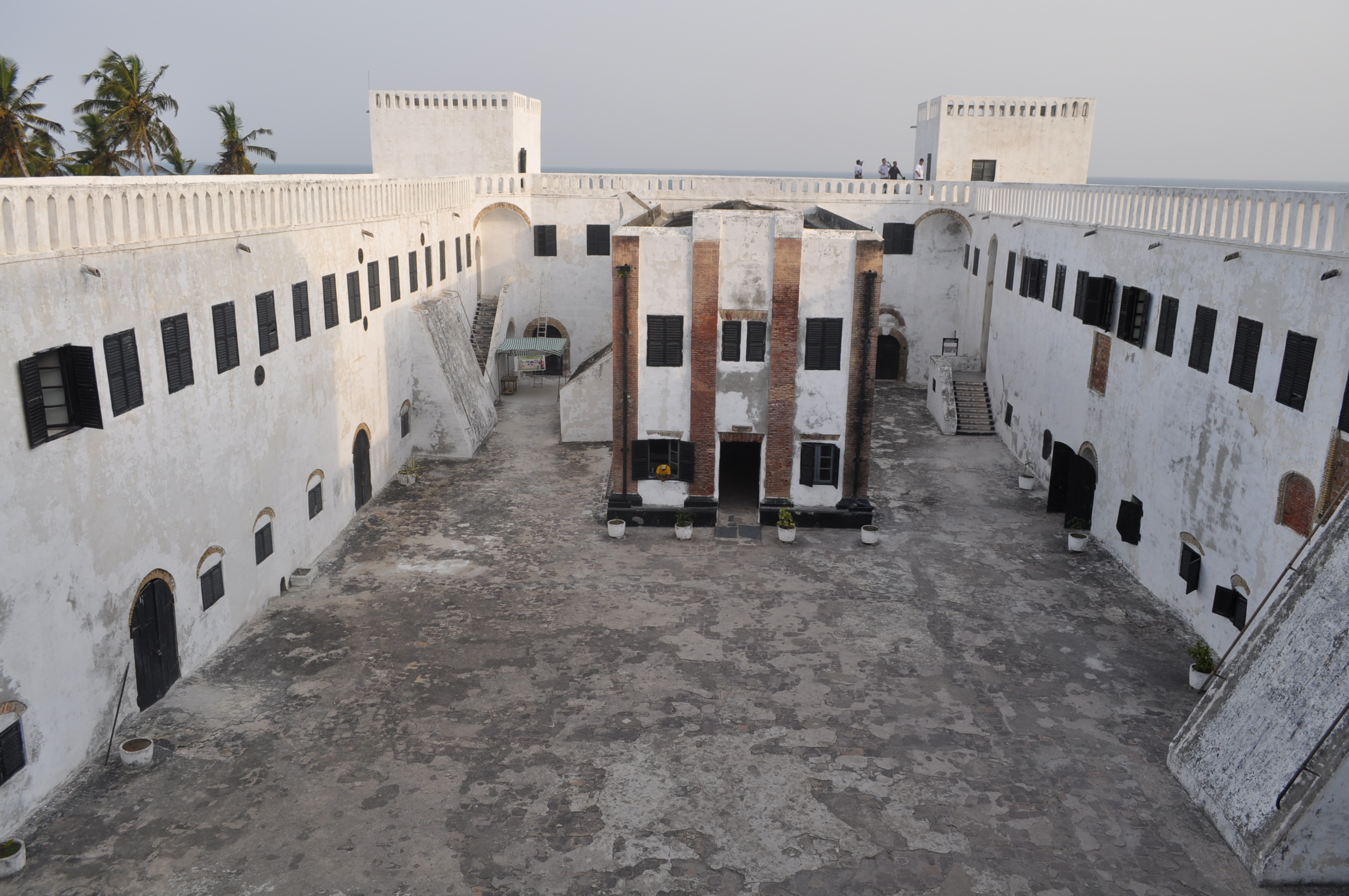
- The school was located in the church of Elmina Castle

Information
- Established: 1815
- Closed: 6 April 1872
- Language: Dutch

During the later years of Dutch colonial rule on the Gold Coast, the Dutch operated a government school (Dutch: gouvernementsschool) in Elmina Castle, primarily aimed at educating Euro-African boys in Elmina. After many false starts, regular education started in the early 1850s with about 50 pupils, rising to more than 150 in the 1860s.

== History ==
The Portuguese started a school in Elmina Castle as early as 1529. For a while after the Dutch had taken Elmina from the Portuguese in 1637, they also operated a school, but teaching soon came to a halt and was not reestablished until the early 19th century. In 1815, two teachers accompanied governor Herman Willem Daendels to the Gold Coast, but they were let go as part of the reorganisation of the colony after Daendels' death in 1818. In 1837, Arie Pette was sent as teacher to the Gold Coast, but he perished soon after arrival during the military campaign against the Ahanta organised by governor Hendrik Tonneboeijer.

Continuous education at the government school started when Melchior Eland took office as headmaster on 11 December 1847. Although he died in office in October 1848, the vacancy of headmaster was immediately filled by Hendrikus Jeltes Tadema, who took office a year later. Tadema had a troubled relationship with the colonial administrators and left the Gold Coast in December 1852.

Tadema's replacement Dirk Demmers, who took office on 11 March 1853, would be headmaster for more than fifteen years. Under Demmers' headmastership, enrolment in the government school greatly expanded, rising from 60 pupils in 1853 to 168 in 1862. To accommodate the increased workload, the first local substitute teacher was appointed in 1857. In 1859, a sewing and knitting school for girls was started by Hiltje Winsemius, spouse of the pastor of Elmina.

Demmers was honourably discharged from his headmastership on 8 May 1868. He was replaced by Arie Hendrik Smits, who had been working as a substitute teacher in Elmina since February 1861. Pieter Simon Hamel was appointed to the vacancy left by Smits' promotion. Hamel would take over as headmaster upon Smits' death on 7 January 1871.

The government school in Elmina was closed after the transfer of sovereignty of the Dutch possessions on the Gold Coast to the United Kingdom on 6 April 1872.

== Staff ==
=== Headmasters ===
| Name | Tenure | |
| Name | Took office | Left office |
|---|---|---|
| Arie Pette | 1836 | 28 October 1837 |
| Isaak Anthony Bosschaart | 14 July 1839 | 15 June 1840 |
| Melchior Eland | 11 December 1847 | 17 October 1848 |
| Hendrikus Jeltes Tadema | 22 October 1849 | 6 December 1852 |
| Dirk Demmers | 11 March 1853 | 8 May 1868 |
| Arie Hendrik Smits | 25 November 1868 | 7 January 1871 |
| Pieter Simon Hamel | 19 January 1871 | 6 April 1872 |

=== Substitute teachers ===
- Johannes Matheus van Enst
- Gerrit Atteveld
- Hendrik Vroom
- Emanuel José (da Costa)
- Kobbena Jacobs
- Joseph Kwakoe

== Notable alumni ==
- Cornelius Badu, member of the German expedition to the Cameroon
- George Emil Eminsang
- Willem Essuman Pietersen
- Hendrik Vroom
