= Embassy of the Netherlands, Accra =

Royal Netherlands Embassy in Ghana
- Interactive map of Royal Netherlands Embassy in Ghana
- 5°34′23″N 0°11′27″W
- Location: Liberation Road 89, Ako Adjei Interchange, Accra, Ghana

Site notes
- Website: ambaccra.nl

The Kingdom of the Netherlands has an embassy in the Republic of Ghana. It has a role in promoting trade between the countries.

== History ==
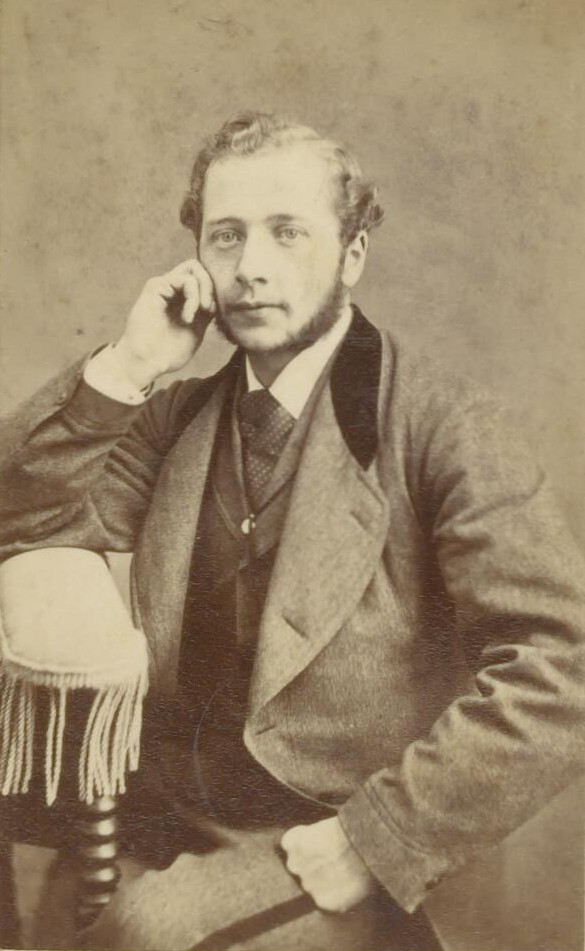
Vice consul Gideon Willem Hugo van der Meer de Walcheren.

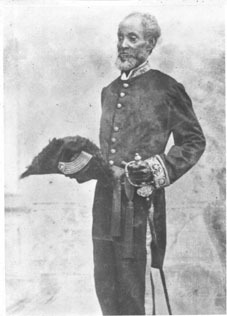
Honorary consul Jacob Abraham de Veer in his uniform.

The embassy of the Netherlands in Ghana has a long history, dating back to the period immediately following the cession of the Dutch Gold Coast to the United Kingdom in April 1872. The Dutch government felt it was necessary to keep a Dutch representation in Elmina and appointed the former colonial administrators Willem Le Jeune and Pieter Simon Hamel as agent and assistant agent, respectively. Apart from the regular diplomatic duties, the agents were also responsible for paying pensions to former employees of the colonial administration and to the African veterans of the Royal Netherlands East Indies Army. The latter task comprised the bulk of the work, and for this reason the agency was mostly paid for by the Dutch ministry of colonies, rather than the ministry of foreign affairs.

The agent and assistant agent were promoted to consul and vice consul on 1 March 1873. Le Jeune retired in 1874 and was succeeded by Hamel. Gideon van der Meer de Walcheren was appointed as the new vice consul. Toward the end of the 1870s, Hamel, who was promoted to consul-general, went on several missions to neighbouring territories in an effort to recruit indentured labourers for the Dutch West Indies and soldiers for the Dutch East Indies, all to no avail. The consulate general at Elmina was disbanded in February 1880. Hamel subsequently appointed the French merchant Arthur Brun as honorary consul at Elmina and left the Gold Coast. Brun was succeeded by the Dutch merchant Antonie Veldkamp in 1883 and by the local Euro-African Jacob Abraham de Veer in 1887.

De Veer was the last honorary consul based in Elmina. In 1895, the consulate moved to Cape Coast, and in 1923 to Accra. In 1961, after Ghana became an independent country, the consulate was upgraded to an embassy.

== Management ==
Ron Strikker is the current Ambassador, and Caecilia Wijgers is Deputy Head of Mission as well as the head of the Development Cooperation Section and the Trade, Press and Culture Section.

== Trade and economy ==
The Netherlands and Ghana have close commercial relations. The Netherlands is one of the top five importers from Ghana; the principal import is cocoa. Oil has been found offshore in 2007 and there has been production of oil since the end of 2010. The Ghanaian economy is still largely dependent on the production and export of two primary goods, cocoa and gold, although the recent discovery of oil should help diversify both activities and sources of revenue. Personal business contact between the two countries is facilitated by daily flights from Amsterdam to Accra and vice versa.

The embassy provides information for companies exploring the Ghanaian market. It works closely together with the Ghanaian Netherlands Chamber of Commerce and Culture (Ghanecc), which itself provides companies with information.

There are programmes that aim to promote trade and development, such as ORIO, Private Sector Investment (PSI), 2xplore, and Matchmaking Facility (MMF).
