= Scout handshake =

Left-handed handshake (done with hand nearest to heart)

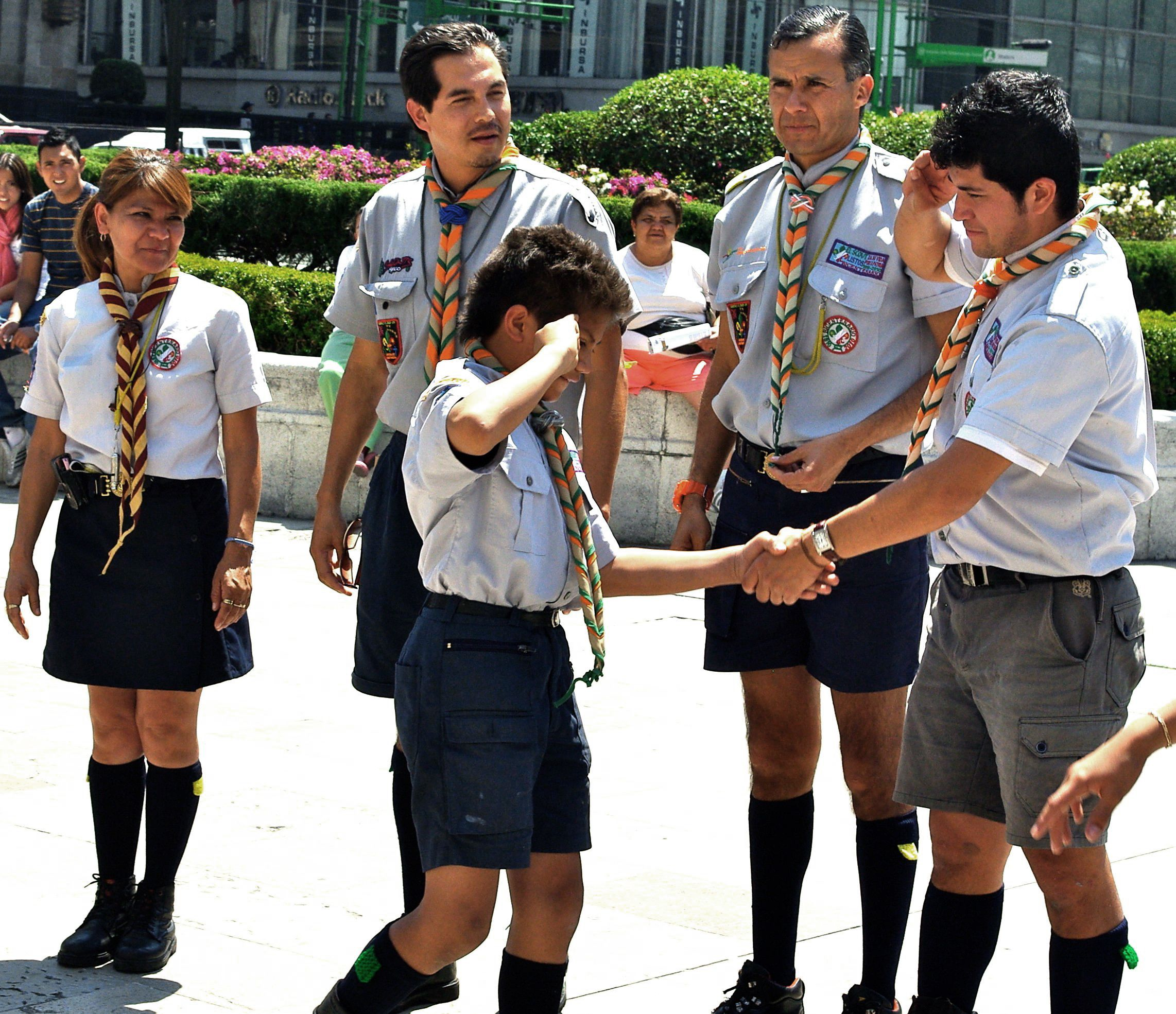
- Mexican scouts using the handshake to welcome new members

The left-handed Scout handshake is a formal way of greeting other Scouts and is used by members of Scout and Guide organizations around the world. The handshake is made with the hand nearest to the heart and is offered as a token of friendship. In most situations, the handshake is made firmly, without interlocking fingers, and many organizations only use this handshake when both people are in uniform. There are some variations of the handshake between national Scouting organizations and also within some program sections.

The 1935 Boy Scout Handbook says that "By agreement of the Scout Leaders throughout the world, Boy Scouts greet Brother Scouts with a warm left hand clasp."

All World Association of Girl Guides and Girl Scouts members share the left handshake, and when meeting other Girl Guides and Girl Scouts, it may be used in conjunction with the Scout sign done with the right hand.

== Meaning of the left-hand ==
Various sources have attributed the origin of the handshake, as an ancient sign of bravery and respect, to Lord Baden-Powell's encounter after battle with Prempeh I, or to earlier published works by Ernest Thompson Seton. There exist various versions of the Prempeh story, all centering on African warriors using the left hand to hold their shields and to lower it and shake the left hand of the person was to show they trusted each other.

According to the Ashanti warrior version of the story, then-Colonel Baden-Powell saluted them with his right hand, but the Ashanti chiefs offered their left hands and said, "In our land only the bravest of the brave shake hands with the left hand, because to do so we must drop our shields and our protection." The Ashantis knew of Baden-Powell's bravery because they had fought against him and with him, and they were proud to offer the left hand of bravery.

Another version of the story is that the left-handed handshake was a homage paid to Chief Kweku Andoh who was left-handed and had the tendency to shake hands with his left. Baden-Powell dedicated his account 'The Downfall of Prempeh' to him: "(Without His Permission). To Chief Andoh of Elmina. My Guide, Adviser and Friend". Chief Kweku Andoh was the officer in the British Army that led the troops to Kumase when they captured Prempeh I and purportedly taught Baden-Powell how to scout in the jungle.

The term itself was used as the title of a work by Hilary Saint George Saunders, The Left Handshake: The Boy Scout Movement during the War, 1939–1945, because of the extraordinary courage shown during those times. According to the foreword by British Chief Scout Lord Rowallan,

When Colonel Baden-Powell entered the capital city of the Ashanti people in 1890 he was met by one of the Chiefs who came to him holding out his left hand. B.-P. held out his right in return but the Chief said: "No, in my country the bravest of the brave shake with the left hand." So began the "left handshake" of the world-wide brotherhood of Scouts. In this book are told some of the stories of courage and endurance shown by Scouts in many different countries during the war of 1939–45. There would not be room even in many books to tell them all. Many, indeed, can never be told; some for political reasons, some because the actors died unknown. They remembered their Promise, to do their best to do their duty to God, and their Country; to think of other people and not themselves. So, when the time came, they were prepared in body and in spirit to render their service. Their record is unsurpassed; they were "the bravest of the brave."

The left hand is also closer to the heart, with that attendant symbolism.
