= Evert Pieters =

Dutch painter

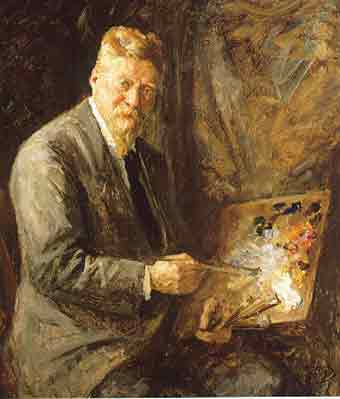
Evert Pieters; portrait by Baruch Lopes Leão de Laguna (date unknown)

Evert Pieters (11 December 1856 in Amsterdam – 17 February 1932 in Laren) was a Dutch painter, known primarily for landscapes and interiors.

== Biography ==
He was born to a poor family and was apprenticed to a house painter at an early age. At the age of nineteen, he went to Antwerp, seeking an apprenticeship with a decorative painter to improve his chances of earning a good living. While there, he also took drawing classes in the evening at the Royal Academy of Fine Arts. Eventually, he found a position with the Belgian landscape painter, Theodoor Verstraete.

He had his first successful showing at the Exposition Universelle d'Anvers (1885). He remained in Belgium as a freelance painter and won a medal at the Seconde Exposition Internationale d'Anvers in 1894 for his painting of a wheatfield in Flanders. He married shortly thereafter, dividing his time between Paris and Barbizon; concentrating on landscapes and still-lifes after the style of the old Dutch Masters. That same painting received a gold medal at the Salon two years later.

In 1895 he returned to the Netherlands and settled in Blaricum. He was not as successful there, however, and his request for membership at the Pulchri Studio was denied. Despite being married, his life took on a Bohemian quality. He began doing interiors with figures, which became popular in the United States.

Shortly after 1900, he spent time in Italy to recover from surgery. After that, his work became more Impressionistic and often included flowers. In 1905, he moved to Katwijk aan Zee and began painting beach scenes. A few years later, he moved to Laren and lived there until his sudden death during a taxi ride home from Baarn.

== Personal life ==
Pieters married Marie Eugenie van den Bossche (1855–1940), daughter of Jules van den Bossche and Badima on 15 October 1895 in Haarlem.

== Selected paintings ==
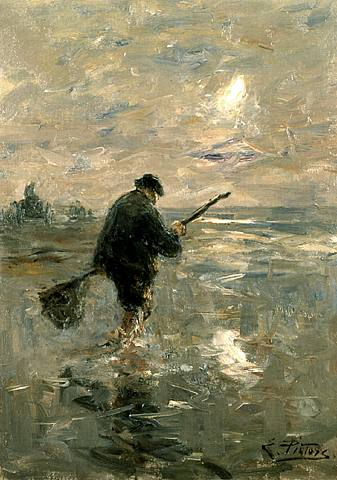
Shell Fisherman

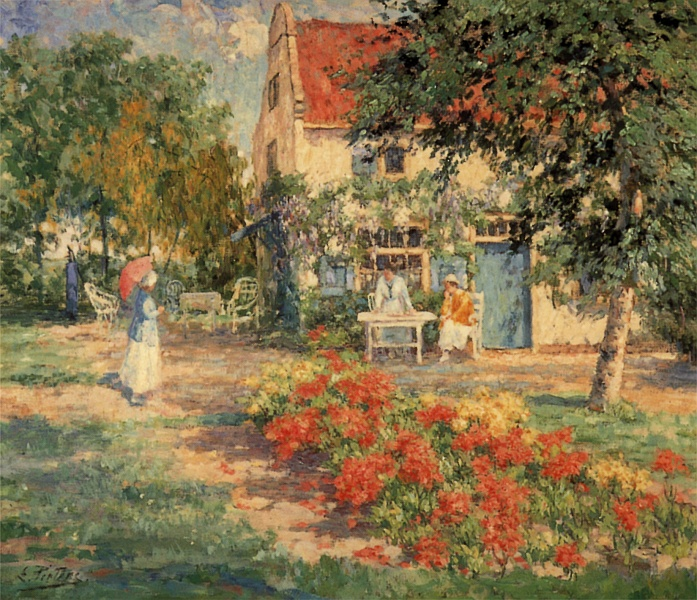
Summer Day at the
Painter's Home

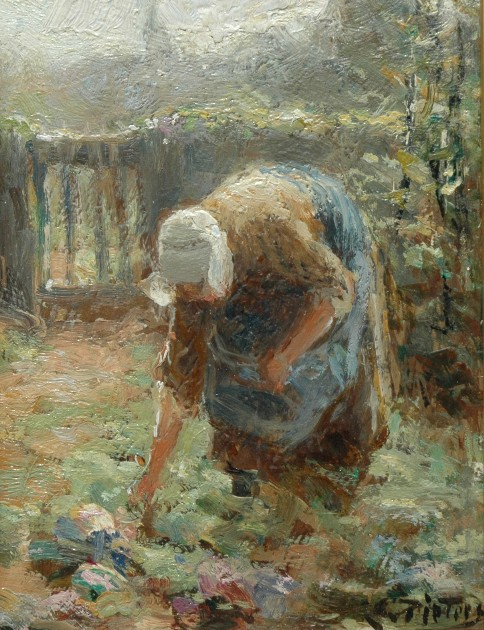
Working in the Vegetable Garden

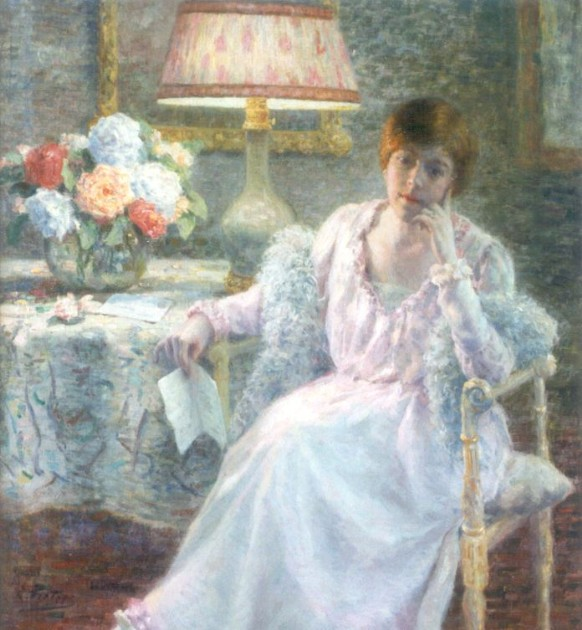
Interior with
Elegant Woman

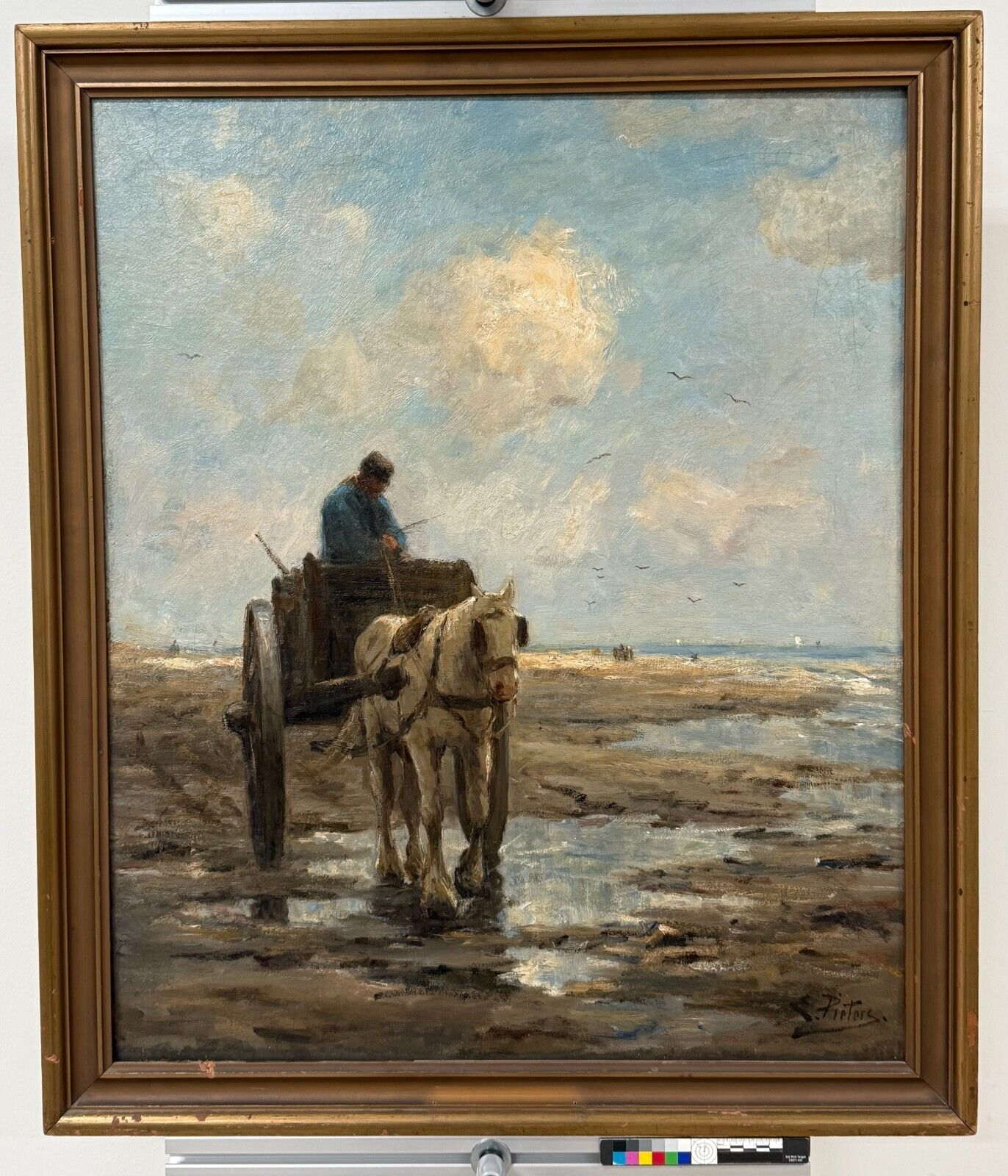
The Shell Fisher
