= George Pieter Willem Boers =

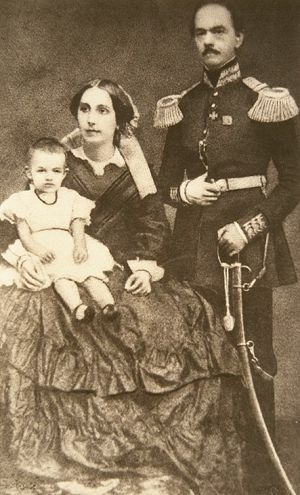

Governor of the Dutch Gold Coast
- In office 17 April 1867 – 15 May 1869
- Monarch: William III of the Netherlands
- Preceded by: Willem Hendrik Johan van Idsinga
- Succeeded by: Cornelis Johannes Marius Nagtglas

Personal details
- Born: 3 February 1811 Hazerswoude, Netherlands
- Died: 30 August 1884 (aged 73) Salatiga, Java, Dutch East Indies
- Spouse: Johanna Sophia Catharina van Reede van Oudtshoorn

George Pieter Willem Boers (born 3 February 1811 – 30 August 1884) was a colonel of the Royal Netherlands East Indies Army, who after his retirement served as Governor of the Dutch Gold Coast.

== Biography ==
George Boers was born in Hazerswoude to Charles Guillaume Boers and Henriette Marie Gertrude l'Honore.

After the Belgian Revolution, Boers was mobilised for the Ten Days' Campaign, becoming second lieutenant with the Second Battalion of the First Division of the South Holland schutterij. In 1842, Boers sailed to the Dutch East Indies to join the Royal Dutch East Indies Army. The journal he kept during his journey from Hellevoetsluis to Batavia was posthumously published by a relative. Boers retired from the Dutch East Indies Army as a colonel.

In 1867, after his retirement from the army, Boers was installed governor of the Dutch Gold Coast. His most important task was to ensure the smooth transition of power on the forts interchanged with the United Kingdom on 1 January 1868. The trade proved a disaster, however, and Boers was blamed for not dealing with the situation well. After the wealthy Elmina merchant George Emil Eminsang and military commander L.H. Meijer went on a mission to The Hague to discuss the situation, the Dutch Minister of the Colonies Engelbertus de Waal recalled Boers and replaced him with the experienced Cornelis Nagtglas, who had been governor of the Dutch Gold Coast before.

== Publication ==
- Dagboek Hellevoetsluis 11-5-1842 - Batavia 20-9-1842 van George Pieter Willem Boers (1811-1887) (Posthumously published by H.R. van der Woude)

== Personal life ==
Boers married Johanna Sophia Catharina van Reede van Oudtshoorn on 27 March 1850 in Semarang in the Dutch East Indies. They had three sons and four daughters.

Boers died on 30 August 1884 in Salatiga on the island of Java in the Dutch East Indies.
