= Palembang Highlands Expeditions =

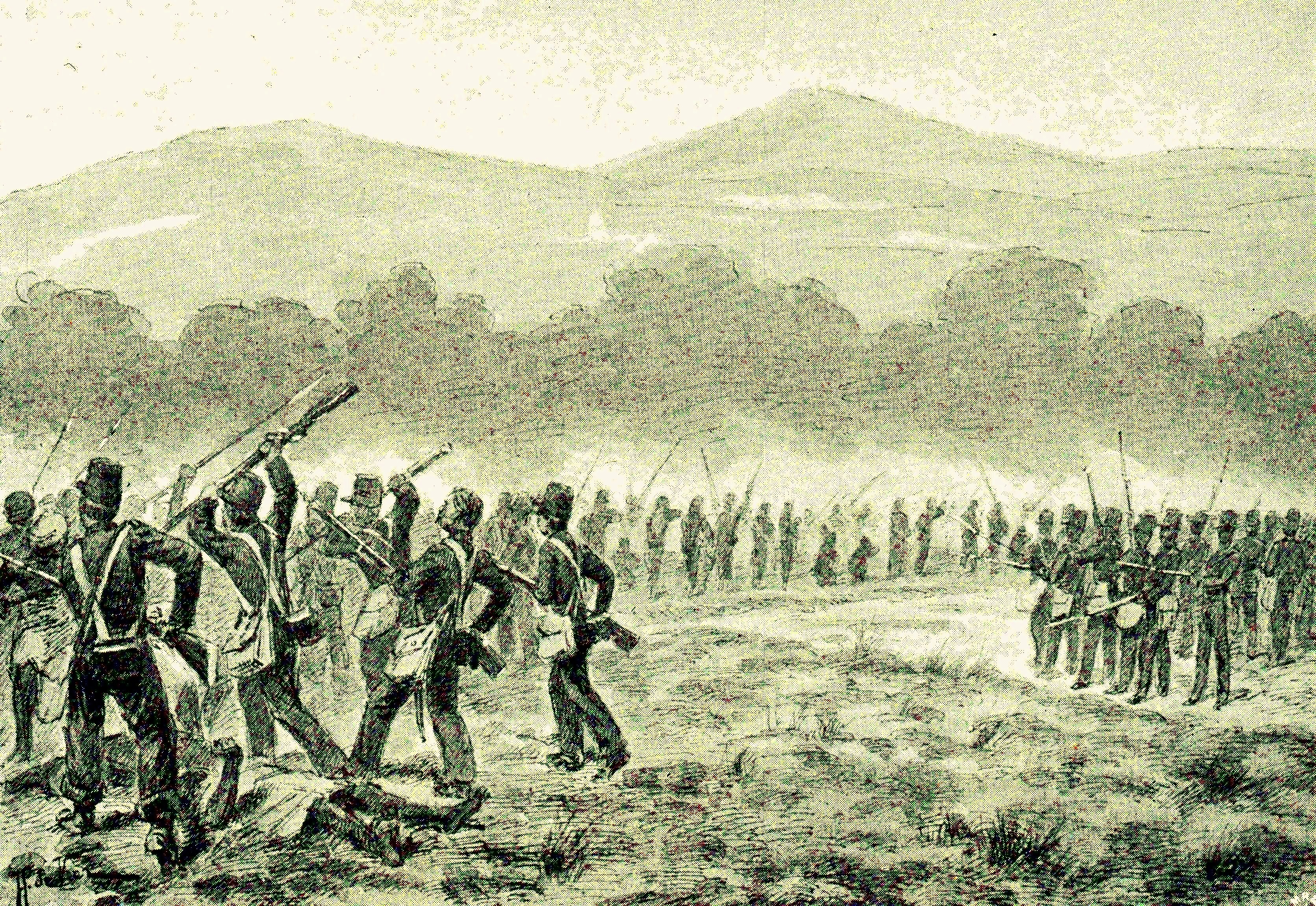
Dutch troops in Goenoeng Maraksa

The Palembang Bovenlanden Expeditions were punitive expeditions by the Royal Netherlands East Indies Army to Palembang in South Sumatra (1851–1859).

== Sources ==
- 1900. W.A. Terwogt. Het land van Jan Pieterszoon Coen. Geschiedenis van de Nederlanders in oost-Indië. P. Geerts. Hoorn
- 1900. G. Kepper. Wapenfeiten van het Nederlands Indische Leger; 1816–1900. M.M. Cuvee, Den Haag.'
- 1876. A.J.A. Gerlach. Nederlandse heldenfeiten in Oost Indë. Drie delen. Gebroeders Belinfante, Den Haag.
