= Dutch Gold Coast expedition of 1869–1870 =

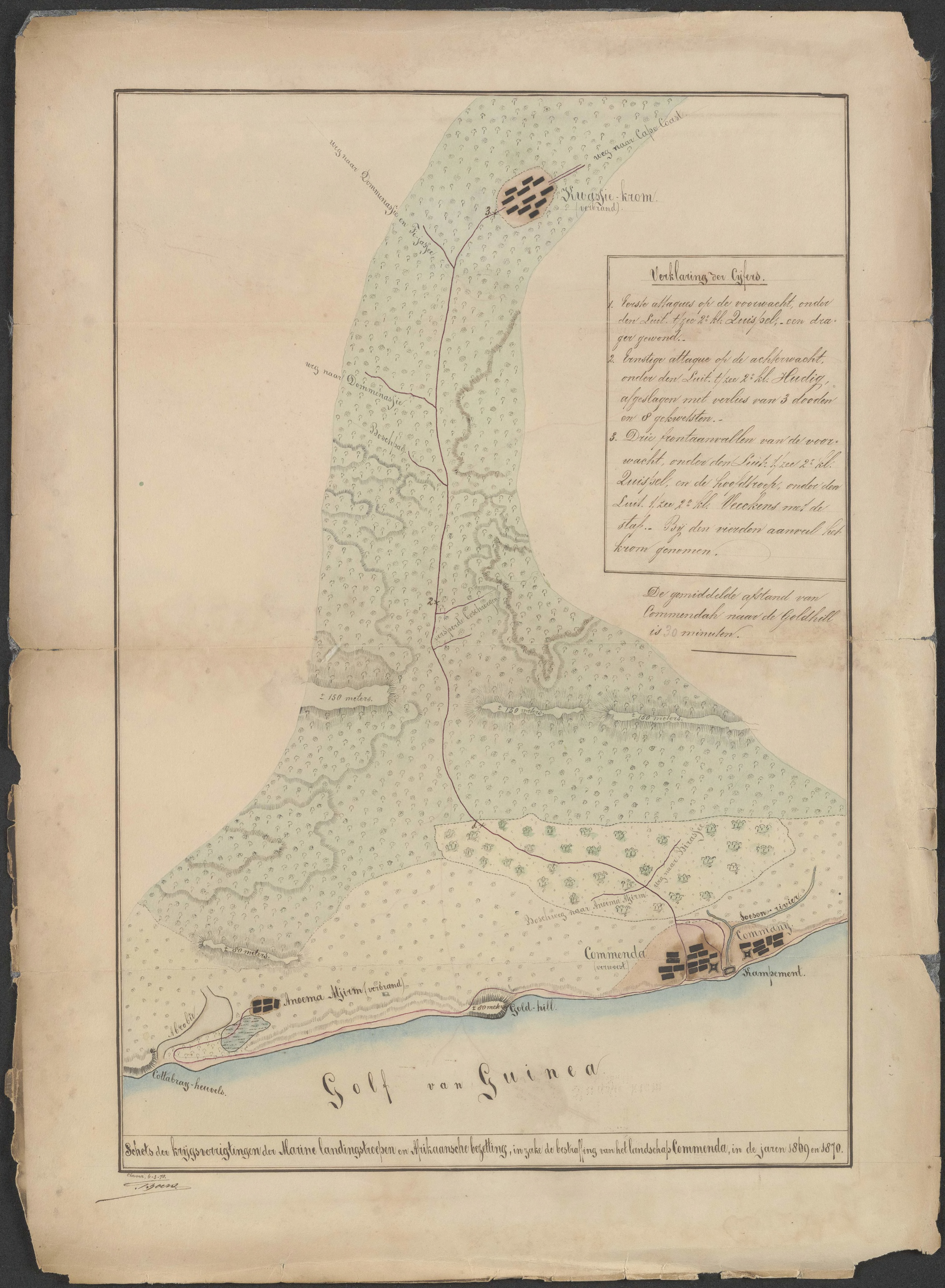
- Map of the Komenda campaign
Date	1869–1870
Location	Dutch Gold Coast
Result	Dutch victory; Dutch Gold Coast sold to Britain in 1872

Belligerents
Netherlands	Local rulers

Commanders and leaders
Unknown	Unknown

Strength
34 Dutch soldiers, 112 local soldiers	Unknown

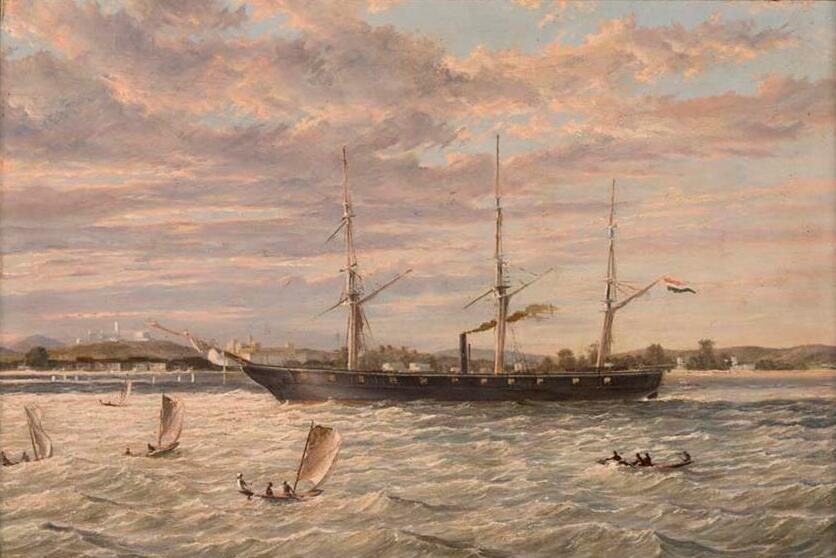
SS Het Metalen Kruis in Elmina in 1868.

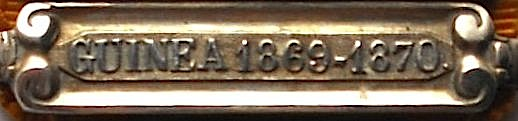
Remembrance buckle for the expedition

The Dutch Gold Coast expedition of 1869–1870 followed the resistance to Dutch rule of the local Fante people surrounding the forts assigned to the Netherlands in the 1868 forts trade along the Gold Coast with Britain. Although the Dutch managed to eventually control the situation, the events marked the end of Dutch involvement in the Gold Coast. Without a profit for almost a century, the escalation finally made the political balance shift in favour of the liberal faction, which wanted to sell the colony to Britain, and away from the nationalist faction, which wanted to retain the colony for reasons of national prestige.

== Background ==
On 5 March 1867, the Convention between Great Britain and the Netherlands for an Interchange of Territory on the Gold Coast of Africa was signed, which stipulated that all forts on the Gold Coast to the east of Elmina were to be handed over to Britain, while all forts to west of the town were to be handed over to the Netherlands. This meant that the formerly British forts at Beyin (British name: Fort Apollonia, new Dutch name: Fort Willem III), Dixcove (British name: Fort Dixcove, new Dutch name: Fort Metalen Kruis), Komenda (British name: Fort Komenda, same in Dutch), and Sekondi (British name: Fort Sekondi, same in Dutch) were to become Dutch. To this effect, the Dutch steam ship Het Metalen Kruis departed from the Dutch harbour at Texel on 6 November 1867, arriving in the Gold Coast on 26 November of the same year.

To give effect to the treaty, the ship first departed to Accra, to hand over Fort Crèvecoeur to the British. Afterwards, the ship sailed to Elmina; the other Dutch forts were handed over by officers. Then, the ship sailed to Dixcove to assist in the transfer of Fort Metal Cross to the Dutch. Both this transfer and the transfer of Fort Apollonia were without problems.

Things changed when the ship set sail for Komenda. The Dutch flag was not raised there, as the local rulers resisted the handing over of the fort, which was not much more than a ruin, to the Dutch. At Sekondi, all went more or less according to plan, leaving the Dutch with only one fort to resist their rule. Joint Anglo-Dutch negotiations with the locals did not bear fruit, and when the local king finally approved the hand-over, he was deposed later the same day. Dutch forces then entered the fort by force, and on 2 February 1868, Het Metalen Kruis left for Elmina, leaving 20 soldiers behind to keep the peace. Skirmishes ensued throughout February, but at the end of the month peace seemed to have returned.

== Komenda hostage crisis and the Dutch punitive expedition ==
Matters took a turn for the worse on 26 May 1869, twelve days after the arrival of the new governor Cornelis Nagtglas, when several Dutch able seamen from the war ship Amstel, which had taken over the duties of Het Metalen Kruis, were taken hostage by the people of Komenda. One of the hostages was killed, while the rest were kept prisoner in the village of Kwassie in the interior. British negotiators managed to buy the hostages out for 15.000 Dutch guilders of ransom, but the public outcry in the Netherlands over the affair was so great that the minister felt obliged to send a military expedition to "chastise" the people of Komenda and Kwassie.

Yet another war ship, the vice-admiraal Koopman, was sent to the Gold Coast with to punish Komenda. An expeditionary force of 9 officers, 18 European soldiers, and 17 Africans was then assembled in Elmina, and the king of Equaffo joined in with a force of 32 Africans and 80 coolies. In December 1869 and January 1870, this force laid the villages of Komenda, Anoema, and Kwassie in ashes. The inhabitants of those villages mostly fled to Cape Coast.

The Dutch government instituted the Medal for Courage and Loyalty Guinea 1869/1870 for seven native soldiers that were deemed to have fought courageously during the expedition.

== See also ==
- Dutch–Ahanta War (1837–1839)
- Anglo-Dutch Treaties of 1870–1871
