= Hendrik Vroom =

Gold Coast Euro-African merchant and government official

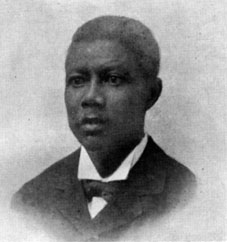

Personal details
- Born: 20 May 1850; Elmina, Dutch Gold Coast
- Died: 13 January 1902 (aged 51); Elmina, Gold Coast
- Spouse(s): Maria Plange; Elizabeth Coorengel

Hendrik Vroom CMG (20 May 1850 – 13 January 1902) was a Gold Coast Euro-African merchant and government official on the Gold Coast. Vroom was known as a strong supporter of the Wesleyan Methodist Church and lived in Bridge House, Elmina, on the corner of Liverpool Street and opposite Elmina Castle, from March 1895 until his death in 1902.

== Biography ==
Hendrik Vroom was born in Elmina, Dutch Gold Coast, to Hendrik McCarthy Vroom and Anna Abakoema. Vroom was a pupil of the Dutch government school of Elmina and went on to have a career with the Dutch colonial government. He served as a pharmacy assistant to the Dutch officials in 1865, and was installed as a school teacher between 1866 and 1872. In the latter year, the Dutch left the Gold Coast, ceding their possessions to the British. Vroom easily adapted to the new situation, and served as a customs official in British service between 1872 and 1880.

Vroom was then installed as District Commissioner at Prampram, which was a rare honour for a mulatto man. He served at Prampram until 1888, and went on to serve as District Commissioner in Dixcove and Sekondi (1888 – 1889), Eastern Wassa (1889 – 1893), Elmina (1893 – 1896), and Tarkwa (1896 – 1901). He also was Travelling Commissioner to Asante between 1894 and 1896, where he was instrumental in the subjugation of the Asante during the Fourth Anglo-Ashanti War.

Apart from his civil career, Vroom also served in the military. He was an interpreter for the Dutch during the Dutch Gold Coast expedition of 1869–1870 and for the British during the Third Anglo-Ashanti War.

=== Businessman ===
Vroom is not only remembered for his career in public service, but also for his business in Cape Coast, in which he partnered with Willem Essuman Pietersen and Ernest James Hayford. He was involved in gold mining and timber production.

== Personal life ==
Vroom has been married twice, first to Maria Plange and, after her death, to Elizabeth Coorengel. Vroom had at least two children with Maria Plange and probably seven children with Coorengel. Apart from his two legal wives, Vroom also had children out of wedlock, with Ekua Praba and Araba. Vroom at least had twelve children.

=== Recognition ===
Hendrik Vroom was created Companion in the Order of St Michael and St George in 1896.
