= Jan Albert Hendrik Hugenholtz =

Dutch naval officer

Governor of the Dutch Gold Coast
- ad interim
- In office 8 June 1871 – 17 September 1871
- Monarch: William III of the Netherlands
- Preceded by: Cornelis Johannes Marius Nagtglas
- Succeeded by: Johannes Wirix

Personal details
- Born: 12 March 1825 Amsterdam, Netherlands
- Died: 24 February 1874 (aged 48) The Hague, Netherlands
- Spouse: Elly Poolman

Jan Albert Hendrik Hugenholtz (born 12 March 1825 – 24 February 1874) was a Dutch naval officer, who served as Governor ad interim of the Dutch Gold Coast between 8 June and 17 September 1871.

== Biography ==
Jan Albert Hendrik Hugenholtz was born in Amsterdam to naval officer Frederik Jacob Anthony Hugenholtz and Alberta Stoffelina Geertruida Bruinier. He followed in his father's footsteps and eventually became Commander (Dutch: kapitein-luitenant-ter-zee).

Hugenholtz was in command of the naval forces on the Dutch Gold Coast when Governor Cornelis Nagtglas left for the Netherlands on sick leave due to gout attacks. This left Hugenholtz, who had no experience in colonial administration, in charge of a colony that had been put into a crisis due to a trade of forts with the United Kingdom about which the local African peoples had not been consulted. After just over three months of governorship, Hugenholtz went back to the Netherlands on sick leave, leaving the second-in-command of the navy, Johannes Wirix in charge of the colony.

== Personal life ==
Hugenholtz married Elly Poolman on 21 April 1869 and had one son.

== Decorations ==
- Order of the Netherlands Lion (Knight)
- Legion d'Honneur
