= Chief Kweku Andoh =

Kweku Andoh
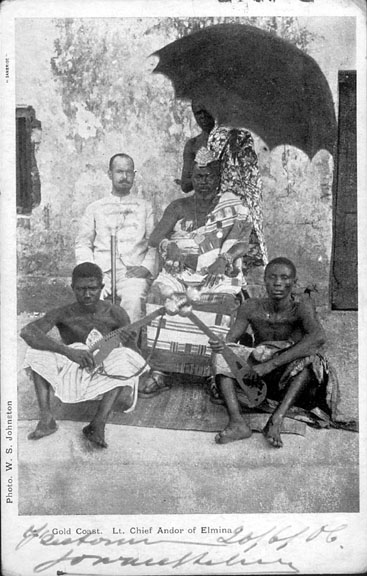
- Chief Kweku Andoh and H. P. N. Muller

Regent of Elmina
- Reign: 1873 – 1898
- Born: c. March 1836; Senya Beraku, Gold Coast
- Died: 14 December 1898 (aged 62); Elmina, Gold Coast

Chief Kweku Andoh (March 1836 – 14 December 1898) was a military officer in the British army and Regent of Edina State (1873–1898). The Fanti expression "Andoh nye woa?" meaning "Art thou Andoh?" is a way of saying "Who Do You Think You Are?" and serves as a testament to the great esteem held towards Chief Andoh.

== Early life ==
Chief Andoh was born in March 1836 in Senya Beraku. His parents were Opanyin Kwamina Amissah and Mena Adwoa Boafo from the Anona Clan of Senya Beraku. His father was a prison officer working for the Dutch in Elmina Castle.

He was educated at the Wesleyan Primary School in Senya Beraku and subsequent schools in Cape Coast and Elmina. After his education he took up a mercantile appointment and eventually became an Assistant Agent for F. & A. Swanzy at Apam, Anomabu, and Cape Coast 1852-1863

== Career ==
Chief Andoh served as Opanyin (Principal Secretary) to Omanhene Kobina Gyan of Elmina from 1863 to 1872. Upon the latter's expulsion to Sierra Leone Chief Andoh was appointed regent of Elmina in 1873 and later of Edina State, a position he held until his death in December 1898.

Chief Andoh was a lieutenant in the British Army and was therefore one of the first Africans to serve as an officer for the British. He was awarded the Queen's Africa General Service Medal and Clasp 1874.

He was instrumental to the British forces led by Sir Garnet Wolseley in the defeat of Prempeh I by leading their way as a scout to Kumasi. One of the members of this campaign was Baden-Powell who dedicated his book, The Downfall of Prempeh to him: "Dedicated (Without His Permission) To Chief Andoh of Elmina. My Guide, Adviser And Friend". It is said that Chief Andoh taught Baden-Powell about scouting in the jungle and was thus a pioneer of the Scouting Movement. Furthermore, the Scout handshake was purportedly a homage to Chief Andoh who was left-handed and had the tendency to shake hands with his left. He is also accredited in assisting the British in creating the First Gold Coast Police Force.
