= Cornelis Nagtglas =

Dutch politician

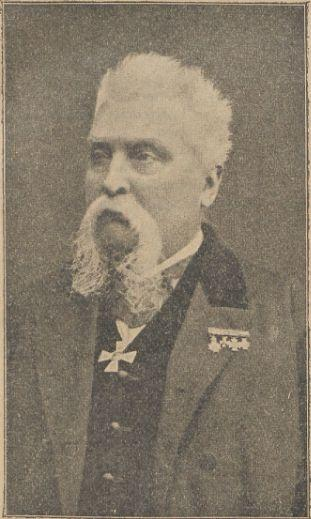

Governor of the Dutch Gold Coast
- In office 15 May 1869 – 8 June 1871
- Monarch: William III of the Netherlands
- Preceded by: George Pieter Willem Boers
- Succeeded by: Jan Albert Hendrik Hugenholtz
- In office 9 September 1857 – 23 June 1862
- Monarch: William III of the Netherlands
- Preceded by: Jules van den Bossche
- Succeeded by: Henry Alexander Elias

Personal details
- Born: 16 May 1814 Utrecht, Netherlands
- Died: 19 January 1897 (aged 82) Harderwijk, Netherlands
- Spouse(s): Anna Abraba Smith (1856–1862); Wilhelmina Michell (1862–1897)

Cornelis Johannes Marius Nagtglas (born 16 May 1814 – 19 January 1897) was a Dutch politician and civil servant, who made a career in the administration on the Dutch Gold Coast. After originally beginning his career at the advanced age of 36, he was promoted through the ranks to eventually become Governor of the Dutch Gold Coast in 1858. He retired to the Netherlands in 1862, but returned to the Gold Coast as governor in 1869, to restore order in the embattled colony. In 1871, he left the Gold Coast again, one year before the transfer of the colony to the United Kingdom.

== Biography ==
Cornelis Nagtglas was born in Utrecht on 16 May 1814 to Cornelis Nagtglas, sr. and Maria Ruyghart. He attended the Latin school in Utrecht but did not graduate, and instead pursued a career in the military. As new rules forbade the promotion of non-commissioned officers to commissioned officers, Nagtglas saw his career plans fall apart. Nagtglas decided to leave the army and pursue a civil career. Adventurism and a desire to get ahead made him apply for a position in the colonial administration of the Gold Coast.

Nagtglas started his career as colonial administrator on the Gold Coast in 1851. After having been installed as an assistant by royal decree on 9 January, he arrived in Elmina on 28 May, and started working as an assistant judge from 28 July onward. On 10 January 1852, he was appointed commander of Fort Crêvecoeur in Accra. Nagtglas returned to Elmina in 1853, where he was promoted to resident on 7 December. On 1 May 1857, after returning from a leave to the Netherlands, Nagtglas became accountant of the Gold Coast. On 9 September 1857, he took over the duties of governor Jules van den Bossche, who left for the Netherlands because of illness, in an acting capacity. By royal decree of 8 May 1858, Nagtglas was appointed full governor, and upon receiving this news, he was installed by the Colonial Council in Elmina on 21 June 1858.

After eleven years of service on the Gold Coast, Nagtglas was, at his own instigation, relieved of his duties on 23 June 1862, retiring to the Netherlands. In the Netherlands, he wrote a small pamphlet named A word concerning the question: "What should the Netherlands do with its possessions on the coast of Guinea?" (1863), in which he first elaborated on the dilapidated state of affairs of the colony, before arguing for increased salary for the administrators, for better education of the local people, for an interchange of territory with the British, for equal tariffs, and for the installation of qualified people on the Gold Coast. If all this were to turn out impossible, Nagtglas posited it would be better to sell the forts to Britain, as Denmark did in 1850.

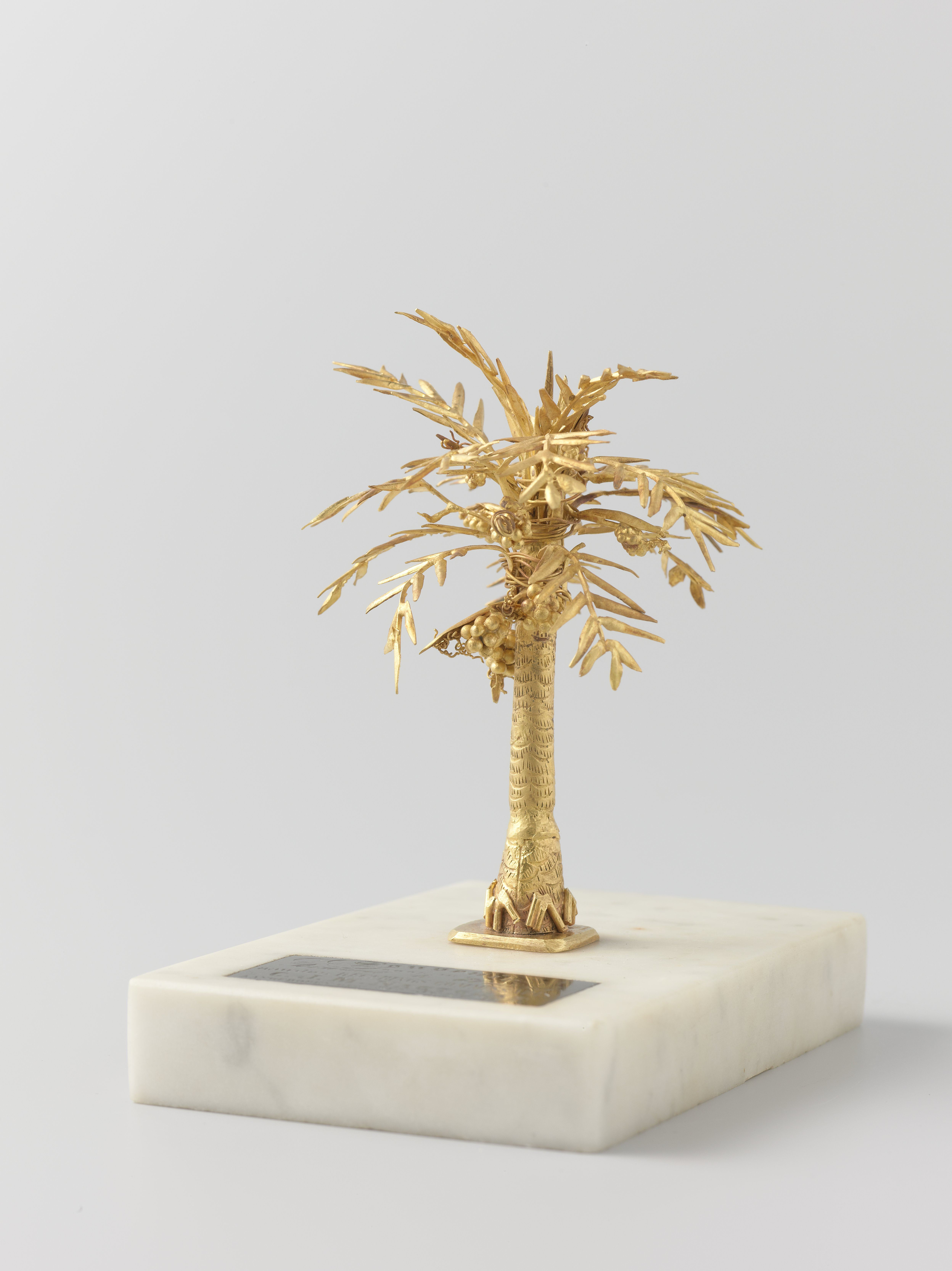
Golden palmtree awarded to Nagtglas by the colonial administrators of the Gold Coast on 8 June 1871.

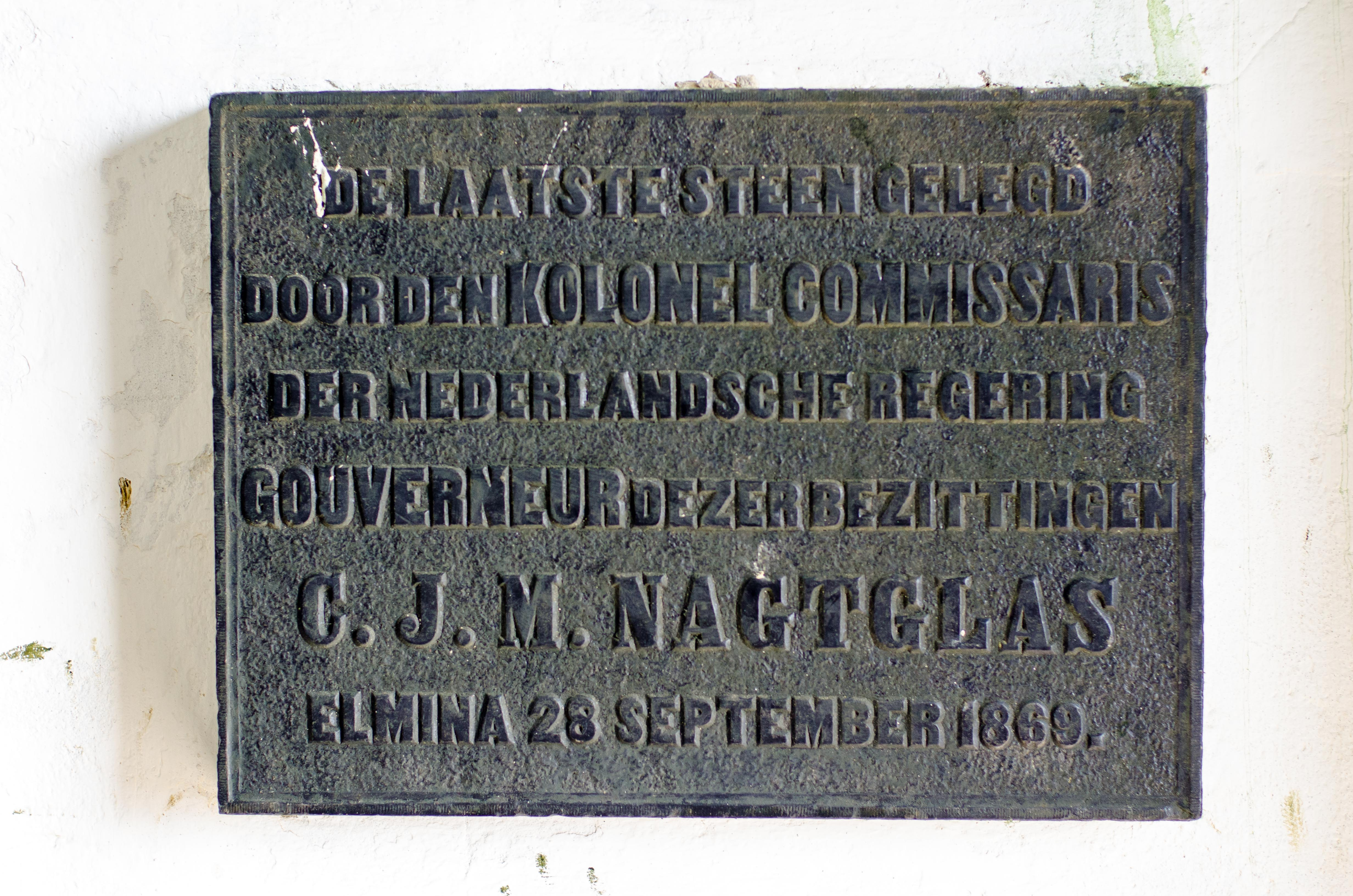
The last stone of the Nagtglas Redoubt built in 1868 on the coast east of Elmina, laid by Cornelis Nagtglas on 28 September 1869 upon his return to the Gold Coast. The stone was later transferred to Elmina Castle, where it can still be seen today. The stone does not commemorate, as is sometimes believed, the departure of the Dutch from the Gold Coast.

Nagtglas was then installed as an advisor to the Dutch government, and negotiated with fellow-advisors Henri Alexander Elias and Bentinck the Convention between Great Britain and the Netherlands for an Interchange of Territory on the Gold Coast of Africa. After this trade of forts proved a failure, and the Dutch Gold Coast came at the brink of being run-over by revolting local peoples, Nagtglas was again appointed governor of the Gold Coast on 20 March 1869, arrived in Elmina on 14 May, and installed the next day. Nagtglas commanded several Dutch military interventions in an effort to subject the revolting locals. Due to illness, he quit his job as Governor on 8 June 1871, left for the Netherlands two days later, and was discharged with honour on 20 October.

== Reputation ==
Among both Dutch and British colonial administrators, Cornelis Nagtglas had a reputation of devotion to all matters concerning the Gold Coast. He initiated and maintained an extensive bureaucracy while governor, giving the impression that he was the governor of a large colony rather than the governor of a small colony consisting of a few forts.

Cornelis Nagtglas is often portrayed in literature as an enlightened colonial ruler, with a good feel towards local customs and politics, and with a sense of realism in terms of the limited Dutch influence on the Gold Coast in the 19th century. Michel Doortmont of the University of Groningen questions this reputation, however, in an investigation of Nagtglas' handling of a dispute between a local chief and the Dutch commander of Fort St Anthony at Axim concerning hammock-bearers. Not understanding the lack of power of the chief towards his subjects in this respect, Doortmont argues that "Nagtglas was perhaps not the big colonial thinker many have held him to be".

== Scientific work ==
During his time on the Gold Coast, Nagtglas collected 236 bird specimens together with zoologist Hendrik Pel, which he donated in 1862 to the Rijksmuseum van Natuurlijke Historie, which is now Naturalis Biodiversity Center.

The Nagtglas's African dormouse is named after Cornelis Nagtglas.

== Personal life ==
During his first period on the Gold Coast, Nagtglas and Anna Abraba Smith (c. 1840–1920), a Euro-African woman, had a son named Karel Anne Nagtglas whom Nagtglas legally recognized as his child when he returned to the Gold Coast in 1869. Anna Abraba Smith later married George Emil Eminsang.

In the Netherlands, he married Wilhelmina Sophia Michell on 17 December 1862. They had two daughters that survived infancy.

== Decorations ==
- Order of the Netherlands Lion (Knight, 1860)
- Order of the Oak Crown (Commander)
- Metal Cross medal
- Honorary medal for important war actions with Guinea buckle
