= Anglo-Dutch Gold Coast Treaty (1867) =

1867 treaty between the United Kingdom and Netherlands

Convention between Great Britain and the Netherlands for an Interchange of Territory on the Gold Coast of Africa
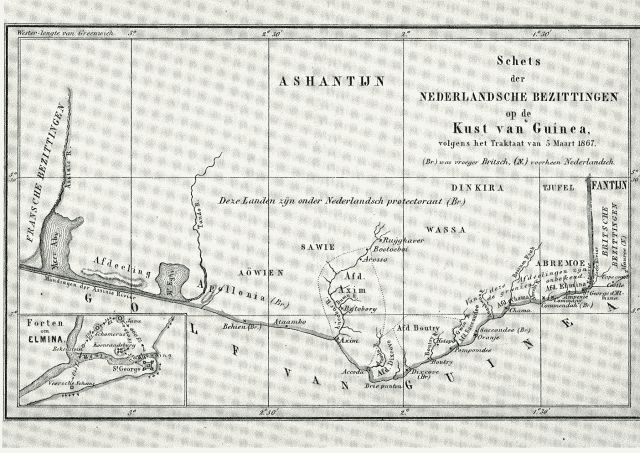
- The Dutch Gold Coast after the trade of forts with Britain.
- Signed: 5 March 1867
- Location: London, United Kingdom
- Effective: 1 January 1868
- Parties: United Kingdom; Netherlands

Full text
- Convention between Great Britain and the Netherlands for an Interchange of Territory on the Gold Coast of Africa at Wikisource

The Anglo-Dutch Gold Coast Treaty of 1867 redistributed forts along the Dutch and British Gold Coasts in order to concentrate the parties' areas of influence. All forts to the east of Fort Elmina were adopted by Britain, and all forts to the west by the Netherlands.

== History ==
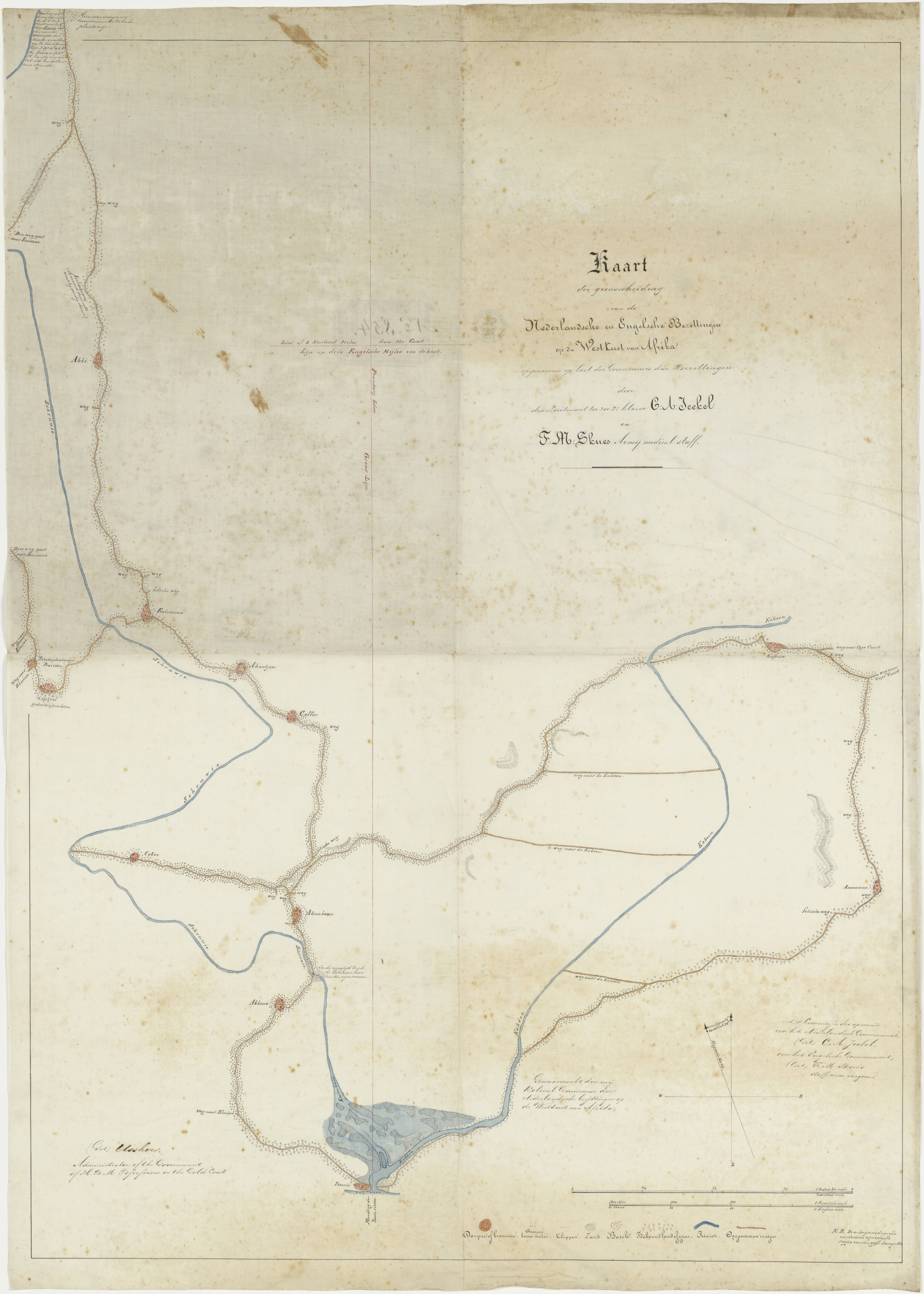
Detailed map of the border between the Dutch and British possessions.

Whereas the Dutch forts on the Gold Coast were a colonial backwater in the 19th century, the British forts were slowly developed into a full colony, especially after Britain took over the Danish Gold Coast in 1850. The presence of Dutch forts in an area that became increasingly influenced by the United Kingdom was deemed undesirable, and in the late 1850s British began pressing for either a buyout of the Dutch forts, or a trade of forts so as to produce more coherent areas of influence.

In the Dutch political landscape of the time, a buyout was not a possibility, so a trade of forts was negotiated. In 1867, the "Convention between Great Britain and the Netherlands for an Interchange of Territory on the Gold Coast of Africa" was signed, in which all Dutch forts to the east of Elmina were handed over to Britain, while the British forts west of Elmina were handed over to the Netherlands.

The trade proved a disaster for the Dutch, as their long-standing alliance with the Ashanti was not well received by the population around the new forts assigned to them. The people of British Komenda refused to hoist the Dutch flag and eventually resorted in taking Dutch naval officers hostage who tried to force their hand. The Dutch responded by sending a punitive expedition to Komenda in 1869–70. Meanwhile, the Fante Confederacy had laid siege to Elmina. In this context, the Dutch colonial minister secretly began negotiating a handover of all Dutch forts to Britain. With the Gold Coast Treaty of 1871, the whole colony was ceded to the United Kingdom for 46,939.62 Dutch guilders.

== Tariffs ==
One of the principal reasons for the trade of forts was that a coherent area of influence would allow the collection of customs duties on the Gold Coast. The United Kingdom and the Netherlands committed themselves, by virtue of article 2 of the treaty, to the following tariffs on the Gold Coast:

	On the Netherland possessions		On the British possessions	
Ale, beer, wine, and all spirits or spirituous liquors	per litre	eight cents	per old wine gallon	six pence
Cigars, snuff or tobacco in any shape	per kilogramme	ten cents	per pound	one penny
Gunpowder	per kilogramme	ten cents	per pound	one penny
Fire arms of any description	each	sixty cents	each	one shilling
On all goods of every other kinds	An ad valorem duty of three per cent on the invoice price			

== Signatories ==
For the Netherlands:

- Arnold Adolf Bentinck van Nijenhuis, Dutch envoy in London;
- Cornelis Nagtglas, ex-governor of the Dutch Gold Coast.

For the United Kingdom:

- Henry Herbert, 4th Earl of Carnarvon, Secretary of State for the Colonies;
- Edward Stanley, 15th Earl of Derby, Secretary of State for Foreign Affairs.

== Forts traded ==
=== From the Netherlands to the United Kingdom ===
Place in Ghana	New British name	Dutch name
Moree	Fort Nassau	Fort Nassau
Accra	Fort Ussher	Fort Crêvecoeur
Kormantin	Fort Cormantine	Fort Amsterdam
Senya Beraku	Fort Good Hope	Fort Goede Hoop
Apam	Fort Patience	Fort Lijdzaamheid

=== From the United Kingdom to the Netherlands ===
Place in Ghana	New Dutch name	British name
Beyin	Fort Willem III	Fort Apollonia
Dixcove	Fort Metalen Kruis	Fort Dixcove
Komenda	Fort Komenda	Fort Komenda
Sekondi	Fort Sekondi	Fort Sekondi

== See also ==
- Anglo-Dutch Treaty of 1814
- Anglo-Dutch Treaty of 1824
- Anglo-Dutch Treaties of 1870–71
- Netherlands–United Kingdom relations
