= Anglo-Dutch Treaties of 1870–1871 =

1870–1871 treaties between Great Britain and the Netherlands

Siak Treaty
Convention between Great Britain and the Netherlands relative to the treatment of British Subjects in the Kingdom of Siak Sree Indrapoora, in the Island of Sumatra
- Signed: 8 September 1870
- Location: The Hague, Netherlands
- Effective: Rejected by the Dutch House of Representatives
- Parties: United Kingdom; Netherlands

Recruitment Treaty
Convention between Great Britain and the Netherlands, relative to the Emigration of Labourers from India to the Dutch Colony of Surinam
- Signed: 8 September 1870
- Location: The Hague, Netherlands
- Effective: 17 February 1872
- Parties: United Kingdom; Netherlands

Gold Coast Treaty
Convention between Great Britain and the Netherlands, for the transfer to Great Britain of the Dutch Possessions on the Coast of Guinea
- Signed: 25 February 1871
- Location: The Hague, Netherlands
- Effective: 17 February 1872
- Parties: United Kingdom; Netherlands

Sumatra Treaty
Convention between Great Britain and the Netherlands, for the Settlement of their Mutual Relations in the Island of Sumatra
- Signed: 2 November 1871
- Location: The Hague, Netherlands
- Effective: 17 February 1872
- Parties: United Kingdom; Netherlands

Full text
- Sumatra Treaty at Wikisource

The Anglo-Dutch Treaties of 1870–1871 were three related treaties between Great Britain and the Netherlands, dealing with colonial disputes and other colonial affairs between the two countries.

== History ==
In 1868, two treaties were being drafted which regulated colonial affairs between the Netherlands and the United Kingdom. The first was regarding Dutch control over the island of Sumatra. Since 1858, the Dutch had subjected the Sultanate of Siak Sri Indrapura to its rule, drawing protest from the British. At the same time, the British were dismayed by the duties their citizens had to pay to do business there. It was clear to both parties that the First Sumatra Treaty of 1824 had to be revised; in return for recognition of full control over Siak, the Dutch awarded the British with equal commercial rights in Siak. The other treaty regulated the recruitment of contract workers from British India for the Dutch colony of Suriname.

Around the same time, Engelbertus de Waal, the new liberal Dutch Minister for Colonial Affairs, wanted to cede the costly Dutch Gold Coast to Britain, drafting a report to that effect in 1869. Due to the negative opinion on the report by the Dutch Council of State, the issue was put off the agenda for the time being. In the meantime, though, minister De Waal secretly began negotiating with the British about relinquishing the Gold Coast to British control, provoking an official British proposal to that effect in 1870. On 21 June 1870, the Council of State replied positive to this proposal, on the condition that such a cession be coupled with a recognition of Dutch control and influence in the East Indies.

To this effect, the Dutch requested a more extensive application of the recruitment treaty for contract workers, and an extra clause in the Siak Treaty establishing the Aceh Sultanate as part of the Dutch area of influence. The British rejected these requests, and because the Netherlands itself had provoked the British request for cession of the Gold Coast, the Dutch government could do little more than signing the Recruitment and Siak treaties on 8 September 1870.

Meanwhile, the British put forward some additional conditions on the cession of the Gold Coast, requesting that the Siak and Recruitment treaties should be ratified simultaneously, so that recruitment could only happen if the British would have their equal rights in Siak. For reasons of personal prestige, minister De Waal requested that the Gold Coast treaty would be ratified simultaneously as well, making the three treaties dependent on each other. The Gold Coast Treaty was signed on 25 February 1871.

In a curious twist of events, the Siak Treaty was rejected in the Dutch House of Representatives by a vote of 38–36, while the Gold Coast Treaty was adopted by a vote of 34–30. Instead of withdrawing all three treaties, the British conceded to renegotiating the Siak Treaty, eager as they were to gain equal rights in Siak. As per Dutch requests, the new treaty, now termed Sumatra Treaty, established full Dutch influence over the Aceh Sultanate. The new treaty was signed in The Hague on 2 November 1871, together with an additional protocol to the Gold Coast Treaty which allowed the Netherlands to once more recruit soldiers for the Netherlands Indies Army in the Gold Coast.

The Dutch Senate adopted the three treaties on 17 and 18 January 1872, paving the way for full Dutch ratification on 17 February 1872. On 6 April 1872, the Dutch Gold Coast was officially ceded to the United Kingdom.

== See also ==
- Anglo-Dutch Gold Coast Treaty (1867)
- Anglo-Dutch Treaty of 1814
- Anglo-Dutch Treaty of 1824
- Aceh War
- Netherlands–United Kingdom relations
