= Arent Magnin =

Dutch politician

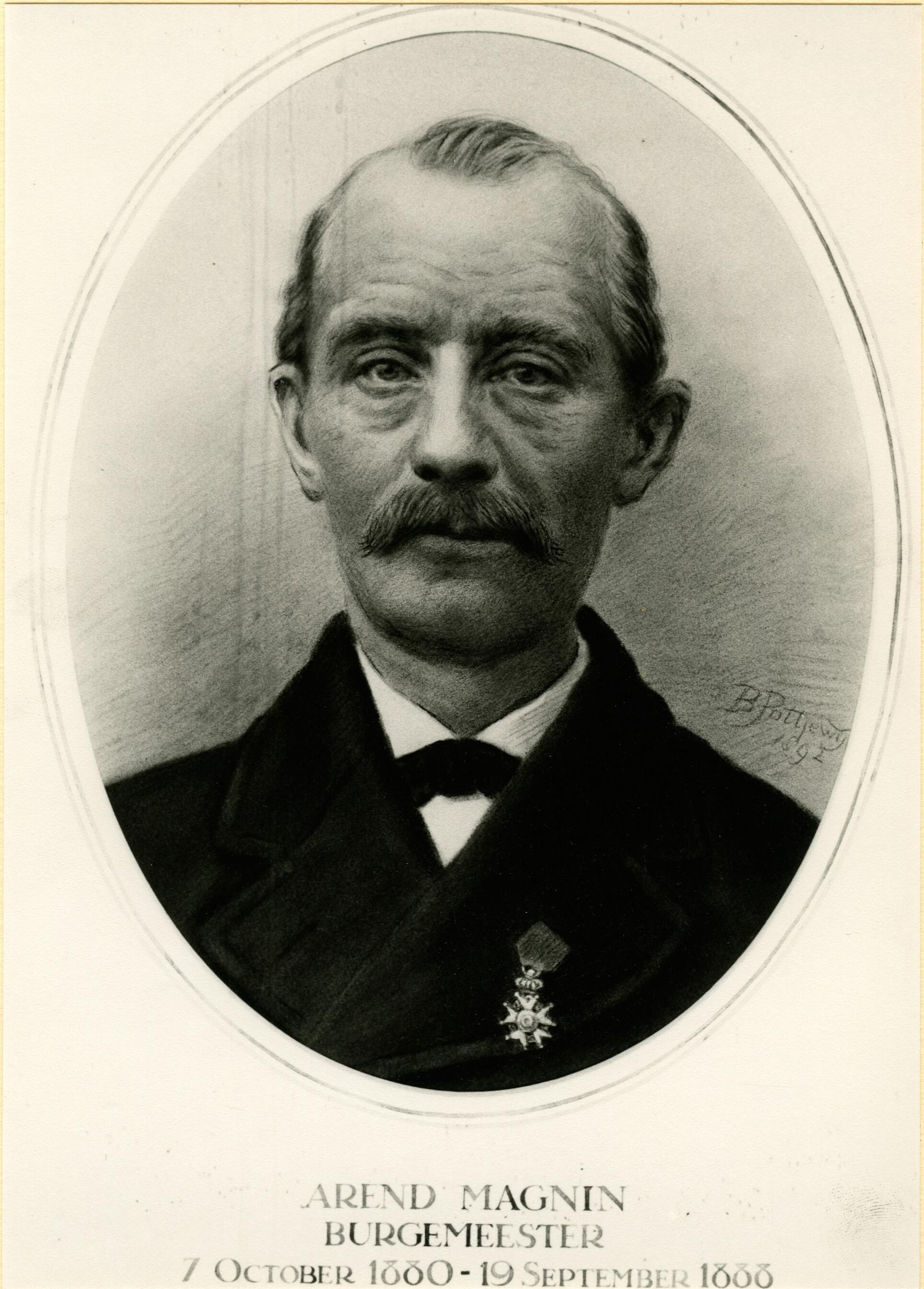

Mayor of Veendam
- In office 1880–1888
- Preceded by: Deddo Harms Bosscher
- Succeeded by: Willem Voormolen

Mayor of Beverwijk and Wijk aan Zee en Duin
- In office 1867–1880
- Preceded by: Jacob Johannes Delruël
- Succeeded by: Johannes Paulus de Zwaan

Mayor of Hoogwoud
- In office 1866–1867
- Preceded by: Dirk Appel
- Succeeded by: Johannes Paulus de Zwaan

Governor of the Dutch Gold Coast
- ad interim
- In office 4 May 1865 – 19 February 1866
- Monarch: William III of the Netherlands
- Preceded by: Henri Alexander Elias
- Succeeded by: Willem Hendrik Johan van Idsinga

Personal details
- Born: 13 January 1825 Meppel, Netherlands
- Died: 19 September 1888 (aged 63) Veendam, Netherlands
- Spouse: Margaretha Moerman

Arent Magnin (born 13 January 1825 – 19 September 1888) was a Dutch politician, who made a career in the administration on the Dutch Gold Coast and who later served as mayor in several Dutch municipalities.

== Biography ==
Arent Magnin was born in Meppel to Jean Samuel Magnin and Grietien Wildeboer. He was appointed assistant on the Gold Coast in 1857, serving as commandant of Fort Patience at Apam from 1858 onwards. He was also appointed replacement judge at the Court of Justice in Elmina. During the European leave of governor Cornelis Nagtglas, Magnin temporarily became second in command of the colony, serving as bookkeeper, secretary and public prosecutor under governor ad interim Cornelis Meeuwsen. Upon Nagtglas' return, he was installed adjutant to the governor. Magnin was granted European leave in September 1863.

When Magnin returned to the Gold Coast in September 1864, he was promoted to the rank of resident, and again shortly became second in command until governor Henri Alexander Elias returned from European leave in late 1864. After governor Elias retired to Europe for good a few months later, Magnin was installed governor ad interim. Magnin served from 4 May 1865 until 19 February 1866, when the newly appointed governor Willem Hendrik Johan van Idsinga arrived on the Gold Coast. Magnin was then honourably discharged, retiring from service on the Gold Coast and returning to Europe.

In the Netherlands, Magnin was appointed mayor of Hoogwoud in 1866, of Beverwijk and Wijk aan Zee en Duin in 1867 and of Veendam in 1880. He was still mayor of the latter place when he died in 1888.

== Personal life ==
Magnin married Margaretha Moerman with whom he had six children.

== Decorations ==
- Legion d'Honneur
