= Friedrich Last =

Dutch colonial administrator (1786–1833)

Friedrich Franz Ludwich Ulrich Last

Commander of the Dutch Gold Coast
- In office 26 November 1827 – 28 April 1832
- Monarch: William I of the Netherlands
- Preceded by: Jacobus van der Breggen Paauw
- Succeeded by: Jan Tieleman Jacobus Cremer
- ad interim
- In office 24 February 1824 – 3 January 1826
- Monarch: William I of the Netherlands
- Preceded by: Johan David Carel Pagenstecher
- Succeeded by: Jacobus van der Breggen Paauw
- ad interim
- In office 31 August 1821 – 14 February 1822
- Monarch: William I of the Netherlands
- Preceded by: Johannes Oosthout
- Succeeded by: Librecht Jan Temminck

Personal details
- Born: 3 January 1786 Rostock, Duchy of Mecklenburg-Schwerin
- Died: 7 May 1833 (aged 47) Kampen, Netherlands

Friedrich Franz Ludwich Ulrich Last (born 3 January 1786 – 7 May 1833) was a colonial administrator on the Gold Coast.

== Biography ==
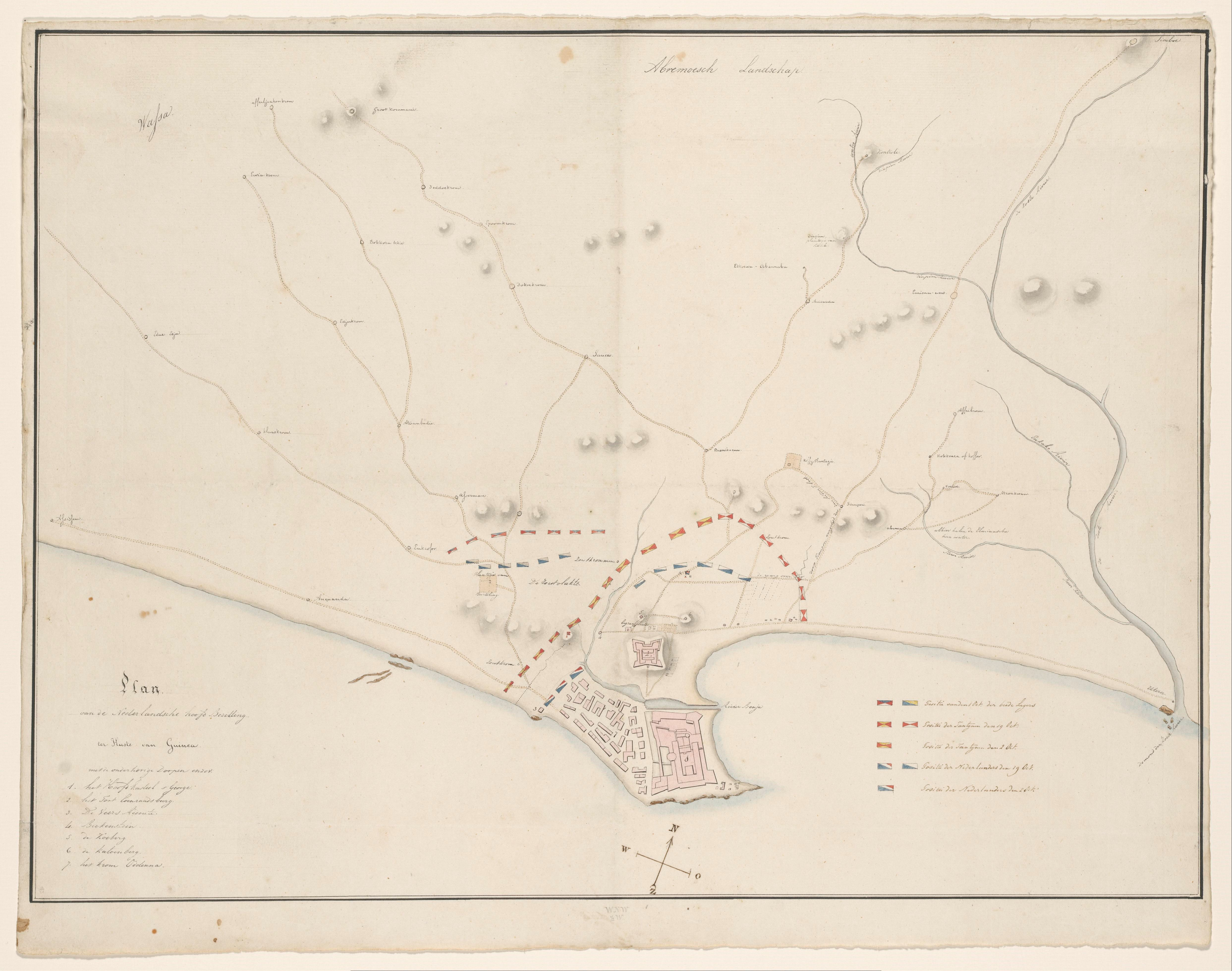
In 1828, during Last's term in office, Elmina was besieged by Fante, Wasa and other British-allied forces.

Friedrich Last was born in Rostock to Johann Christian Last and Catharina Maria Deichman. He was appointed assistant on the Dutch Gold Coast on 1 October 1815, as part of the new colonial administration under governor-general Herman Willem Daendels, and became bookkeeper and cashier on 10 April 1821.

Last served as interim commander between 31 August 1821 and 14 February 1822. During his term in office, on 17 January 1822, Kwadwo Akyampon arrived in Elmina, who was sent by Asantehene Osei Tutu Kwame to establish an Asante residency in Elmina. The purpose of this mission was to secure the loyalty of Elmina and of the Dutch to the Asante Empire, which at the time embroiled in increasingly escalating tensions with the British. After returning to Kumasi to report on his mission to Elmina to the Asantehene, Kwadwo Akyampon took up his residence in Elmina again on 23 July 1823. He would remain in Elmina until his death in 1832.

Last again served as commander ad interim between February 1824 and January 1826, and from 26 November 1827, before being appointed as full commander on 4 October 1828.

Another important development during Last's term in office was the commencing of the recruitment of soldiers for the Dutch East Indies Army on the Gold Coast. Captain at sea E. Lucas, who was sent by the Dutch government on a secret mission to the Gold Coast to investigate the possibility of recruitment, recommended to the Ministry of Colonies that recruitment was possible, which in turn responded by instructing Last on 29 June 1831 to assemble a trial detachment of 150 troops. The instructions only reached Last on 26 November 1831, because the ship that carried the instructions was shipwrecked off the coast of Sierra Leone. Only ten days later, the merchant ship Rotterdams Welvaren arrived at Elmina harbour to ship the recruits to Java. As a consequence of the short window for recruitment, the Rotterdams Welvaren set sail for Java on 17 December 1831 with only eighteen recruits on board. Last reported back to the Ministry of Colonies that recruitment had not only proved problematic because of the short time window, but also because voluntary emigration was an unfamiliar concept in the region. When two additional ships arrived in February 1832, the first one departed with nineteen recruits, and the second one with only seven.

After having been in charge of the colony for three and a half years, Last left the Gold Coast in April 1832 for health reasons and was succeeded in quick succession by three interim commanders, two of whom died in office. Only in May 1833 did his successor Christiaan Lans arrive.

Friedrich Last died in Kampen on 7 May 1833.

== Reputation ==
Last was described by his British colleague George Maclean as "penurious even to meanness" when he refused Kwadwo Akyampon advance payment of kostgeld.

== Personal life ==
Last had at least two children with the Euro-African innkeeper Elisabeth Atteveld: Frans Friedrich Ludwig Ulrich Last (1822–1883), who would move back with him to Kampen in the Netherlands and who would later become Attorney General at the Supreme Court of the Dutch East Indies, and Herman Willem Frederik Last (1825–1850), who remained on the Gold Coast. In November 1831, he fathered another son named Carl Christian Daniël with a woman named Esseboe, who was the slave of Elisabeth Atteveld.

On 15 June 1827, while on leave in the Netherlands, he married Petronella Johanna Aleida van Vlierden in Kampen. Petronella Johanna Aleida van Vlierden was a niece of Aleida Elisabeth Reiniera van Vlierden, the wife of Herman Willem Daendels.

== Decorations ==
Last was decorated with the Military Order of William, Knight 4th class, on 2 December 1832 for his long service on the Gold Coast.
