= Family Group in a Landscape =

Painting by Frans Hals

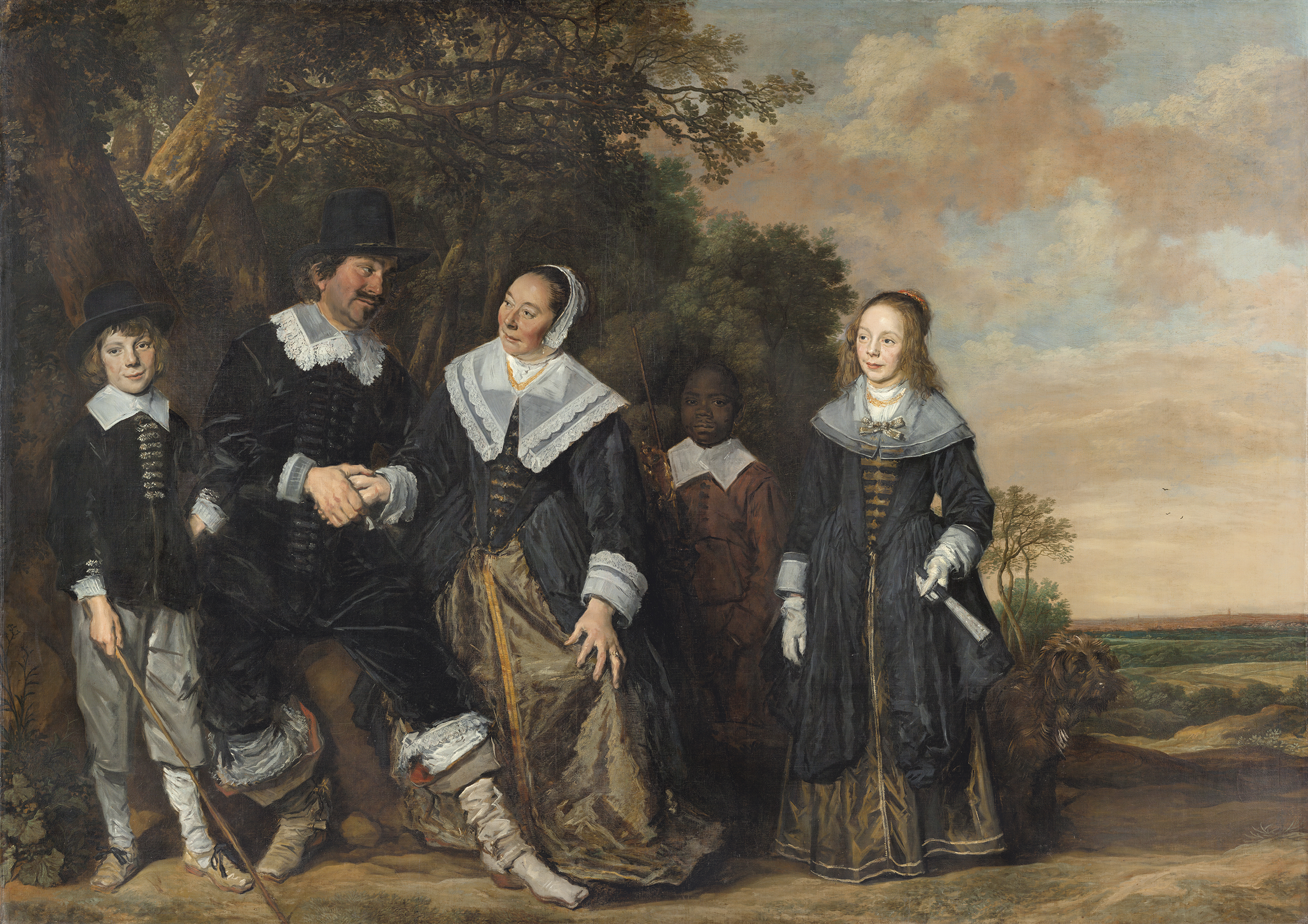
- Family Group in a Landscape
- Artist: Frans Hals
- Year: c. 1645-1648
- Catalogue: Seymour Slive, Catalog 1974: #177
- Medium: Oil on canvas
- Dimensions: 202 cm × 285 cm (80 in × 112 in)
- Location: Museo Thyssen-Bornemisza; Madrid
- Accession: 179 (1934.8)

Family Group in a Landscape is an oil-on-canvas painting by the Dutch Golden Age painter Frans Hals, painted c. 1645-1648, and now in the Museo Thyssen-Bornemisza, in Madrid.

== Painting ==
The painting is one of a handful of paintings that Hals made of families in the "picnic style" of open air settings, but this is the only one featuring a black boy–something of a rarity in Haarlem during Hals' lifetime. It is also one of the largest paintings by Frans Hals, and the largest painted by him that is not devoted to the civic guards of Haarlem that Hals painted many different times throughout his career.

In 2023, Ineke Mok and Dineke Stam argued that the family portrayed is that of Jacob Ruychaver (ca. 1620-1656) and his wife Maria Hendrixs. Their daughter Geertruid (1633-1710) and son Willem (1634-1673) fit the age of the children displayed on the painting. It was common for former directors-general of the Gold Coast to commission a painting with an African servant (compare Ruychaver's successor Jan Valckenburgh).

== Name ==
In his 1910 catalog of Frans Hals works Hofstede de Groot wrote:

441. A FAMILY GROUP OF FIVE PERSONS IN THE OPEN AIR, M. 89. — To the left sits a man, holding in his right hand the right hand of his wife, who is seated beside him to the right. He looks at her and she at him. The man has a slight moustache and imperial, and wears a tall black hat, a black velvet costume with a lace collar and wristbands, and high riding- boots lined on the inside. The woman wears a greenish-grey dress with a black bodice and over-skirt trimmed with yellow bows, and a white cap, collar, and wristbands all trimmed with lace. Her left hand rests on her left knee. To the left, beside the man, stands a youth, holding a stick in his right hand and resting the left at his side. He looks with a smile at the spectator. He wears a black hat, a black velvet jacket with a collar and wristbands, short breeches, and shoes. To the right, beside the woman but farther back, stands a little boy; he wears a dark-brown costume with a white collar, and looks at the spectator. Farther right again, in the same plane as the man and woman, stands their daughter, looking towards the left foreground. Her right arm hangs down at her side; in her left hand she holds a closed fan. She wears a dark dress, a white headdress with red ornaments, a thin white collar, and wristbands. Beside her to the right crouches a poodle. In the background to the left are trees, while in the right distance is a town. It is all painted in neutral grey tones, relieved only by the red of the riding-boots. Painted about 1640. Canvas, 79 inches by 112 inches. Exhibited at the Royal Academy Winter Exhibition, London, 1906, No. 102.

- In the possession of the Warde family since about 1750.
- In the collection of Colonel Warde, Squerries Court, Westerham, Kent; sold to a Continental collection, October 1909 (for, it is said, £55,000).

This painting came into the hands of the art dealer Joseph Duveen in 1909. It was purchased in 1910 by outbidding J.P. Morgan for $500,000 by Otto Hermann Kahn who subsequently lent it to the Metropolitan Museum of Art. In 1935 it was in the Mogmar Art Foundation in New York, from whom the Thyssen-Bornemisza collection purchased it.

Little is known of the provenance of the painting in the 18th century. It was put on show at the Royal Academy in 1906 as Portraits of The Painter and his Family. Her colored underskirt and the flat collars instead of the more common millstone style show them to be wealthy burghers who could afford the latest fashion. Like the London family portrait by Hals, the background has been proposed as being painted by Pieter de Molijn; first by Neil MacLaren (with regard to the London family portrait), which was then applied to the Madrid canvas by Seymour Slive. The painting was restored in 1966 and the documentation of the process is kept by the Getty Center.

== Modern inspiration ==
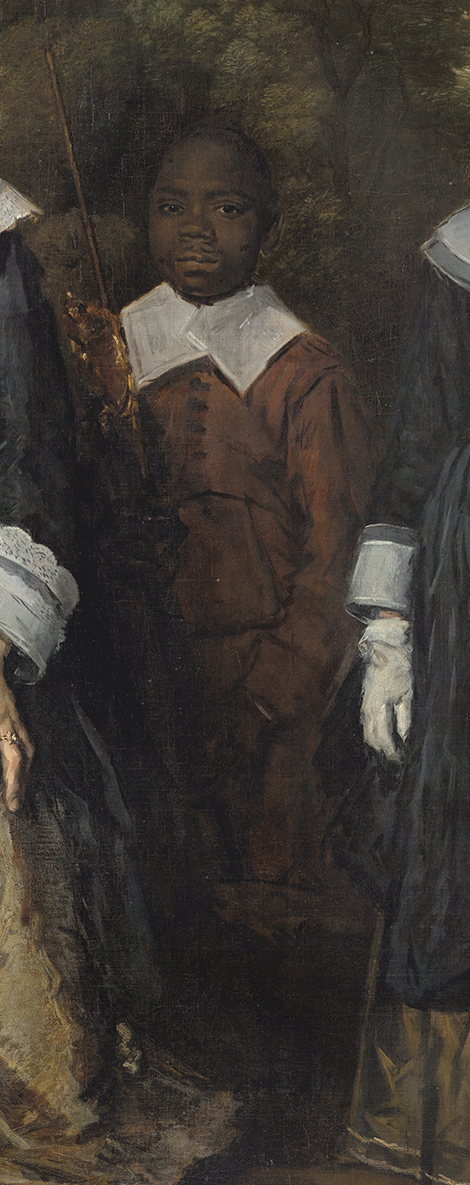
Possibly the boy is carrying a bow and arrow, such as the one mentioned by Camper

In April 2017 the painting became the subject of a TED talk by Titus Kaphar, who chose to copy the painting in order to act out a bold statement about how Black people are portrayed in cultural heritage objects, including centuries-old European artworks such as this one. He paints out all figures but the Black boy in the course of his talk, his main point being that more is known about the lace collars in such paintings than about the black figures that appear in the backgrounds of them from time to time. In this specific case, the portrayed owners are equally unknown, but Kaphar has a valid point. The number of Black people in 17th-century Haarlem is virtually unknown but is assumed to be close to zero, considering the difficulties artists had portraying them, according to a popular lecture in 1770 about Facial Angles by Petrus Camper. In that lecture he claimed that another Haarlemmer was the most successful of all at this skill, naming not Hals but Cornelis Visscher.

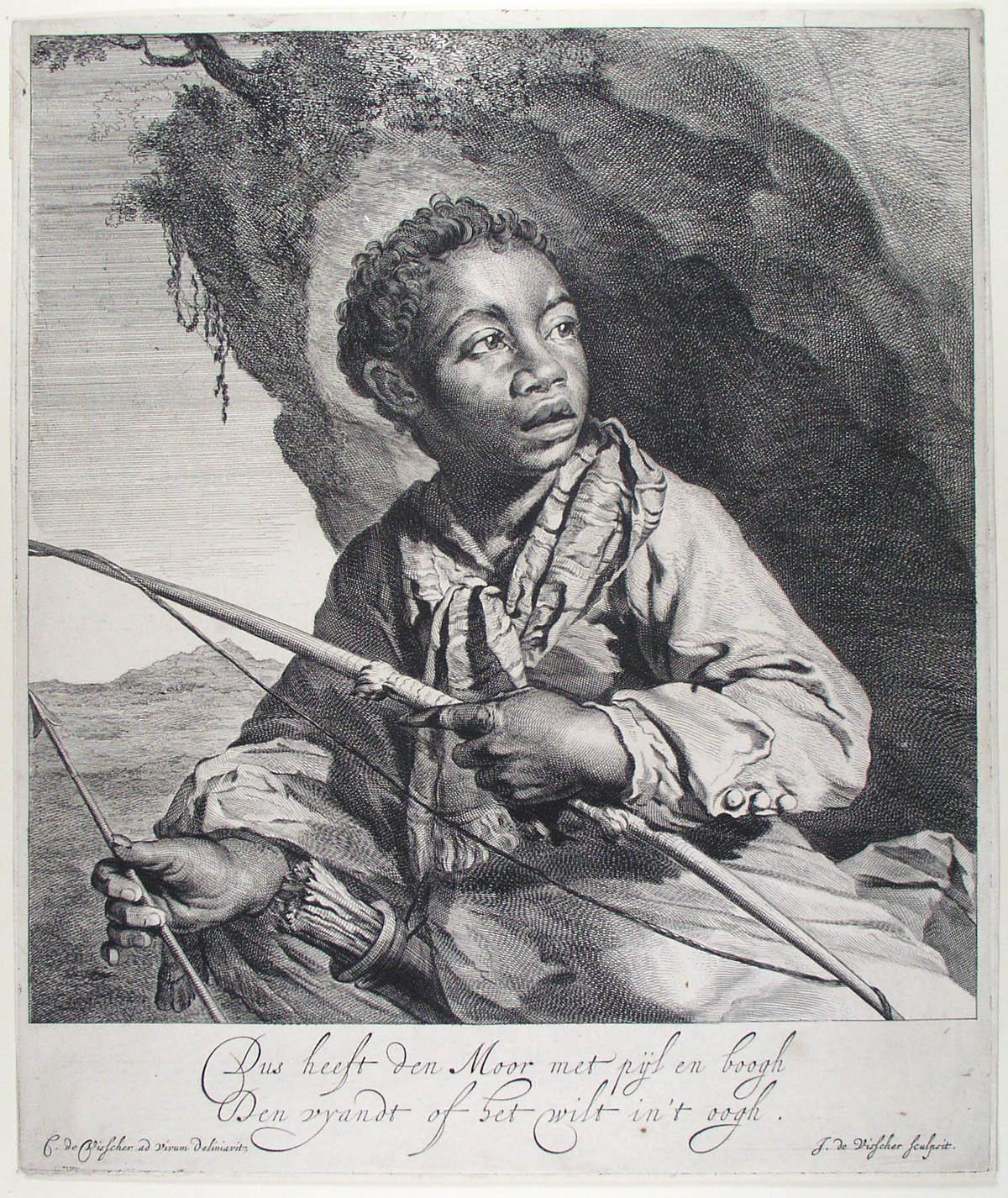
The Moor, an etching by Jan Visscher after a drawing by his brother Cornelis

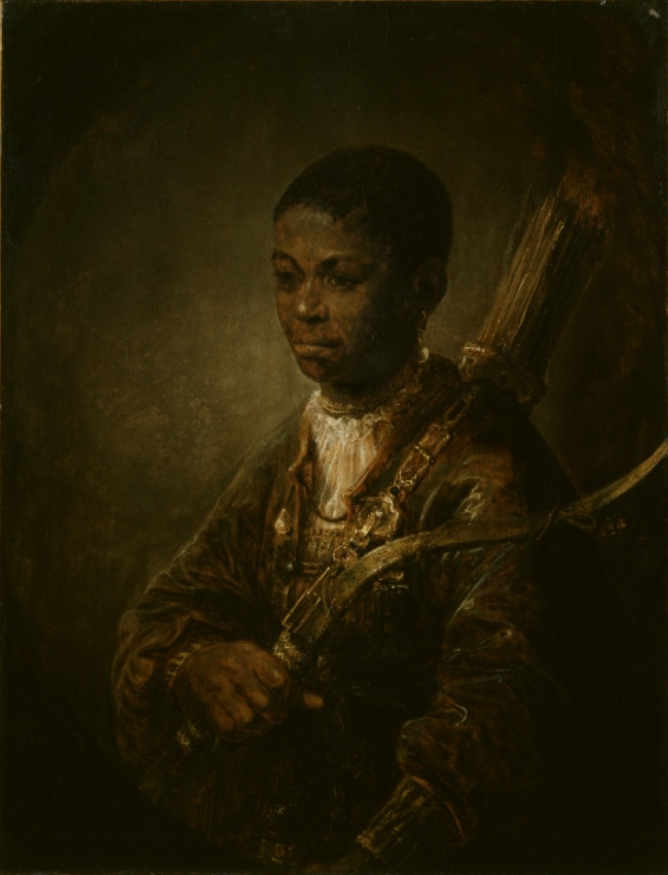
A Young Archer by Govaert Flinck

== See also ==
- List of paintings by Frans Hals
