= Jan Tieleman Jacobus Cremer =

Dutch colonial administrator

Commander of the Dutch Gold Coast
- ad interim
- In office 28 April 1832 – 1 July 1832
- Monarch: William I of the Netherlands
- Preceded by: Friedrich Last
- Succeeded by: Eduard Daniel Leopold van Ingen

Personal details
- Born: 28 March 1795; Middelburg, Netherlands
- Died: 1 July 1832 (aged 37); Elmina, Dutch Gold Coast

Jan Tieleman Jacobus Cremer (born 28 March 1795 – 1 July 1832) was a Dutch colonial administrator on the Gold Coast. He was interim commander from 1832 until his death on 1 July.

== Biography ==
Jan Cremer was born in Middelburg to Johannes Bernardus Cremer and Elisabeth Johanna Bogaerds. He was originally employed as a clerk in his native Middelburg, before opting for a career in the colonial administration. He was appointed assistant on the Dutch Gold Coast by royal decree of 14 January 1826. In 1828, he succeeded Jacobus van der Breggen Paauw as bookkeeper, secretary, fiscal and cashier. On 28 April 1832, he became commander at interim, after his predecessor Friedrich Last left for the Netherlands. Jan Cremer died barely two months in office, on 1 July 1832. He was buried in the Dutch Cemetery of Elmina.

== Personal life ==
Jan Cremer married Pietronella Anthonetta Geijp in Middelburg on 24 April 1816. They had three children.
