= Eduard Daniel Leopold van Ingen =

Dutch colonial administrator

Commander of the Dutch Gold Coast
- ad interim
- In office 2 July 1832 – 16 March 1833
- Monarch: William I of the Netherlands
- Preceded by: Jan Tieleman Jacobus Cremer
- Succeeded by: Martinus Swarte

Personal details
- Born: 22 June 1799; Zutphen, Netherlands
- Died: 16 March 1833 (aged 33); Elmina, Dutch Gold Coast

Eduard Daniel Leopold baron van Ingen (born 22 June 1799 – 16 March 1833) was a Dutch colonial administrator on the Gold Coast. He was interim commander from 1832 until his death on 16 March 1833.

== Biography ==
Eduard van Ingen was born in Zutphen to baron Antoni Lucas van Ingen, a captain in the Dutch army, and Elisabeth Louise Heckers.

Eduard van Ingen was appointed assistant on the Dutch Gold Coast by royal decree of 8 July 1828. He was promoted to resident on 1 July 1829. Van Ingen became acting commander of the Dutch Gold Coast after the previous acting commander Jan Tieleman Jacobus Cremer died in office on 1 July 1832. Van Ingen took office on 2 July 1832.

After Kwadwo Akyampon died on 18 September 1832, Van Ingen sent the military commandant Reinier Klaassen to Kumasi to inform the Asantehene about his death.

Van Ingen himself also died in office on 16 March 1833, reportedly because of alcoholism. He was buried in the Dutch Cemetery of Elmina.
