= Johan David Carel Pagenstecher =

German colonial administrator

Commander of the Dutch Gold Coast
- ad interim
- In office 17 February 1824 – 24 February 1824
- Monarch: William I of the Netherlands
- Preceded by: Hendrik Adriaan Mouwe
- Succeeded by: Friedrich Last

Personal details
- Born: 15 February 1784; Osnabrück, Prince-Bishopric of Osnabrück, Holy Roman Empire

Johan David Carel Pagenstecher (15 February 1784 – unknown) was a colonial administrator who served as acting commander of the Dutch Gold Coast.

== Biography ==
Johan David Carel Pagenstecher was born in Osnabrück to Gabriel Christoph Pagenstecher and Clara Elisabeth Gösling. His father was a lawyer and senior councillor in Osnabrück and belonged to the Pagenstecher family, which enjoyed good relations with the Dutch royal House of Orange-Nassau. On 1 November 1816, Pagenstecher joined the Dutch army à la suite for six years and went over to the battalion for the colonies on 1 January 1817. He departed to the Gold Coast on 11 December 1817.

Following the death of acting commander Hendrik Adriaan Mouwe on 11 February 1824, Pagenstecher was designated acting commander of the Dutch Gold Coast on 17 February 1824, and took his oath of office on 21 February. He served until Friedrich Last arrived three days later to succeed him.

Pagenstecher had a troubled working relationship with colonial administrators and Euro-Africans on the coast. In late 1824, several colonial administrators complained to acting commander Friedrich Last about the conduct of Pagenstecher, which apart from heavy drinking included making condescending remarks about the abilities of virtually all Europeans and Euro-Africans on the Dutch Gold Coast and spreading rumours about their misconduct. It was also alleged that Pagenstecher had threatened acting commander Hendrik Adriaan Mouwe with a gun when Pagenstecher was sentenced to imprisonment in Fort St. Jago for taking ammunition from the commander's room without authorization, and that he deleted references to this incident from the governor's journal after Mouwe died and he took over as acting commander. He was also accused of having poisoned commander Willem Poolman, whose death was considered suspicious by the British surgeon major Beresford.

When Pagenstecher was again accused of transgressions on 22 January, acting commander Last decided to send Pagenstecher back to the Netherlands, "so that he could explain his grievances to the Minister". At the end of March a ship was found that was willing to take Pagenstecher, and after selling his last belongings, Pagenstecher left the Gold Coast on 24 March 1825.
