= Dirck Wilre =

Dutch smuggler and slave trader

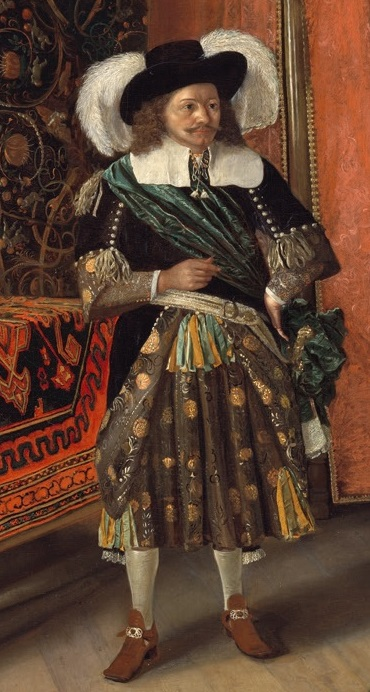

Director-General of the Dutch Gold Coast
- In office 12 December 1668 – May 1674
- Preceded by: Huybert van Ongerdonk
- Succeeded by: Johan Root
- In office 7 April 1662 – 23 December 1662
- Preceded by: Casper van Heussen
- Succeeded by: Jan Valckenburgh

Personal details
- Born: c. 1636 Graft, Dutch Republic
- Died: 27 September 1674 near Schiermonnikoog, Dutch Republic
- Spouse(s): Helena Correa; Maria de Perel

Dirck Dircksz. Wilre (born c. 1636 – 27 September 1674) was a Dutch smuggler and slave trader who joined the Dutch West India Company in 1662, and who quickly climbed the ranks to become acting Director-General of the Dutch Gold Coast in 1662. He eventually was installed as full Director-General in 1668.

== Biography ==
Dirck Wilre was the youngest of three children born to Dirck Dircksz van Wilre, who was a sailor and captain, and Trijntjen Hendrix. Like many people from Graft, including some of Dirck's relatives, Dirck started his career as a smuggler or lorrendraaier, sailing on the Coast of Guinea to trade gold, Guinea pepper, ivory and slaves. During one of his trips he had to abandon his ship in the Cameroon as it was in disrepair. He boarded a ship of the Dutch West India Company headed for Elmina. Arriving in the latter place in December 1658, Dirck Wilre decided to join the Dutch West India Company.

By 1660, Wilre had climbed the ranks to become head merchant or oppercommies at Fort Nassau near Moree. After Director-General Van Heussen died in 1662 of a tropical fever, Wilre was installed as acting Governor-General. He served until the former Director-General Jan Valckenburgh arrived in Elmina in January 1663 to take over command.

In Elmina, Wilre fathered three children with Helena Correa, a Euro-African daughter of a former governor of Fort Santo Antonio at Axim who was previously married to Jan Valckenburgh. In 1665, Wilre was finally granted permission to return to Europe. After his return, he married Maria de Perel in Amsterdam on 3 September 1666. In late 1667, Wilre was installed Director-General of the Gold Coast once again. He arrived in Elmina on 20 January 1668 to assume his second term as Director-General. In May 1674, Wilre was relieved of his duties once more. His return to the Dutch Republic proved a disaster though. After a long journey home, plagued by disease and misfortune, the ship on which Wilre was transported sank near the island of Schiermonnikoog on 27 September 1674, drowning Dirck Wilre, merchant Joannes Stockram, and doctor Jacob Aven, among many others.

== Painting by Pieter de Wit ==
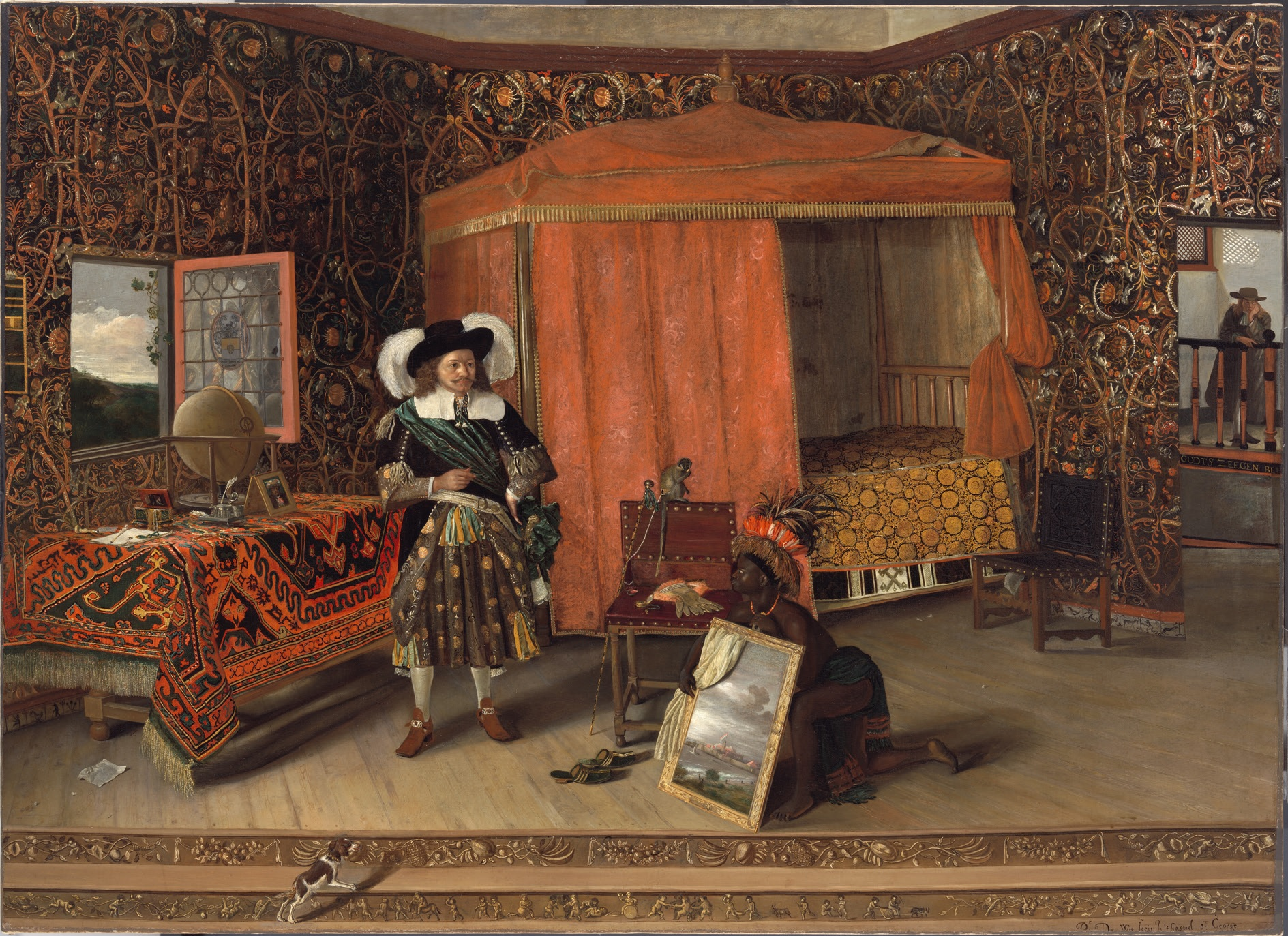
Dirck Wilre in Elmina by Pieter de Wit (1669).

In 1669, during his term as Director-General, Dirck Wilre was painted by Pieter de Wit, probably together with Willem Godschalck van Focquenbroch, who served in Elmina as fiscal. It is likely that the painting was ordered by Wilre himself as a present for his wife Maria de Perel in Amsterdam.
