= Isaac de Roever =

Mayor of Diemen
- In office 20 June 1811 – 18 October 1812

Governor-General of the Dutch Gold Coast
- ad interim
- In office 28 April 1804 – 16 June 1805
- Preceded by: Cornelius Ludwich Bartels
- Succeeded by: Pieter Linthorst

Personal details
- Born: c. 1760 Tiel, Dutch Republic
- Died: 18 October 1812 (aged 52) Watergraafsmeer, Zuyderzée, First French Empire
- Spouse(s): Anna Margaretha Staring; Susanna Maria Heddingh

Isaac de Roever (circa 1760 – 18 October 1812) was a Dutch politician, who served as acting governor-general of the Dutch Gold Coast between 28 April 1804 and 16 June 1805, and as mayor of Diemen.

== Biography ==
Isaac de Roever was born in Tiel to Gerard de Roever and Sibilla Heesen. He was baptised on 16 October 1760.

De Roever made a career in the colonial administration of the Dutch Gold Coast. He became acting governor-general of the Dutch Gold Coast after the death of governor-general Cornelius Ludwich Bartels on 18 April 1804. During his term in office, he was summoned to answer his superiors in the Batavian Republic for "excessive behaviours". De Roever served until 16 June 1805, when he was relieved by Pieter Linthorst so that he could recover from illness in the Netherlands. This appointment proved controversial, however, as it was done by the Small Council in Elmina, without the presence of the resident of Fort Saint Anthony Jan Frederik König, who was the more senior resident on the Gold Coast and the more logical successor of De Roever. König protested the procedure, but nevertheless accepted the decision made.

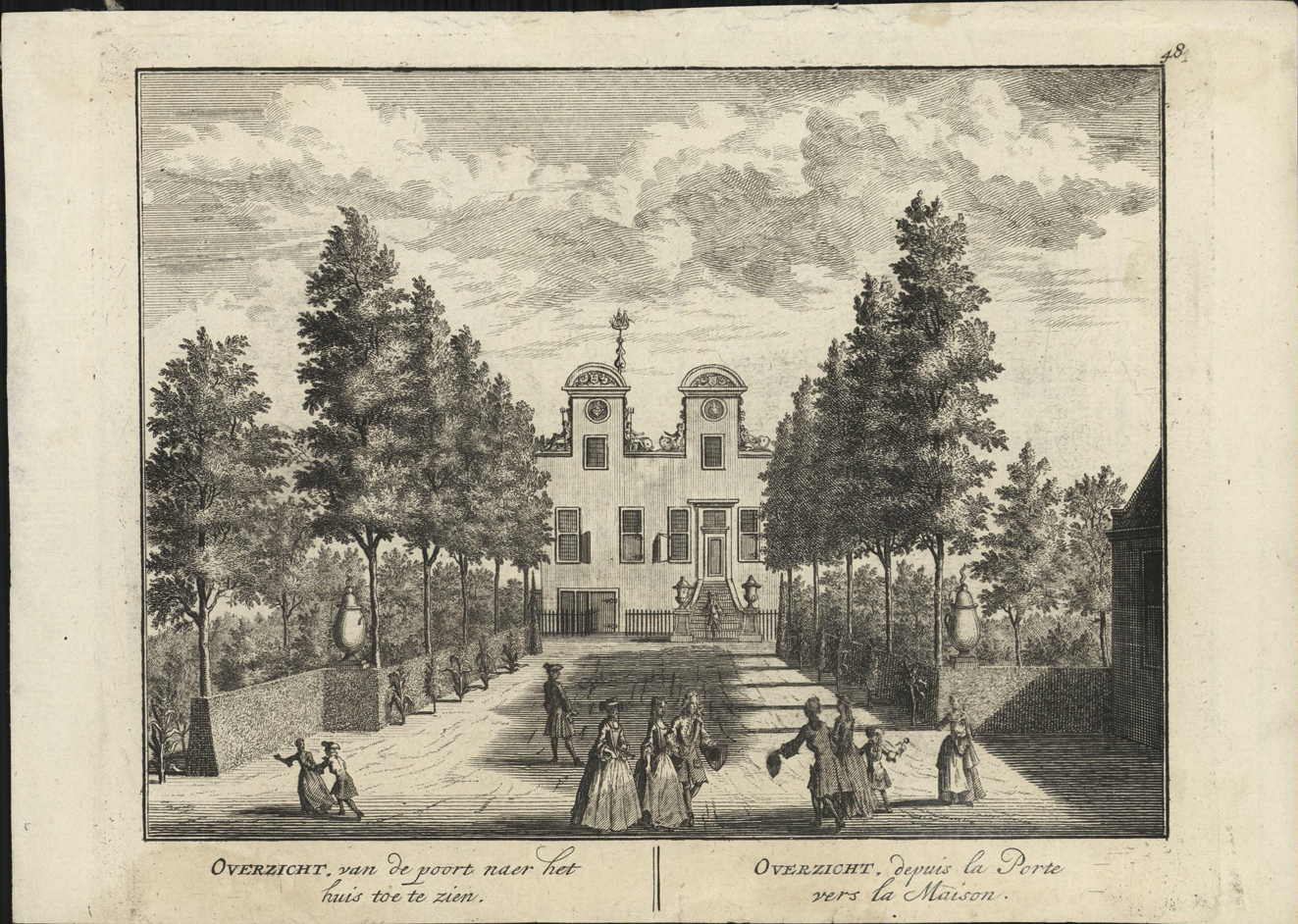
Buitenplaats Meergenoegen.

In 1810, Isaac de Roever bought the buitenplaats of Meergenoegen in Watergraafsmeer near Amsterdam from Johan Pieter Farret. Farret probably had to sell his estate because of financial problems caused by Napoleon's tiercering of Dutch government bonds. De Roever subsequently became mayor of Diemen. When Napoleon visited Amsterdam in 1811, he stayed at Meergenoegen.

Isaac de Roever died on 18 October 1812 on Meergenoegen.

== Personal life ==
Isaac de Roever married Anna Margaretha Staring. After her death he married Susanna Maria Heddingh on 12 September 1811. He had a daughter named Maria Isabella Wilhelmina de Roever from his second marriage. Because Isaac de Roever and Susanna Maria Heddingh married with separation of property, Maria Isabella Wilhelmina de Roever became the sole heir to Isaac de Roever's estate.
