= Johannes Petrus Hoogenboom =

Governor-General of the Dutch Gold Coast
- ad interim
- In office 21 July 1807 – 4 August 1808
- Preceded by: Pieter Linthorst
- Succeeded by: Jan Frederik König

Personal details
- Born: 1778; Rotterdam, Netherlands
- Died: 4 August 1808 (aged 30); St. George d'Elmina, Dutch Gold Coast

Johannes Petrus Hoogenboom (baptised 4 May 1778 – died 4 August 1808) was a colonial administrator on the Gold Coast, who served as acting governor-general of the Dutch Gold Coast between 21 July 1807 and his death on 4 August 1808.

== Biography ==
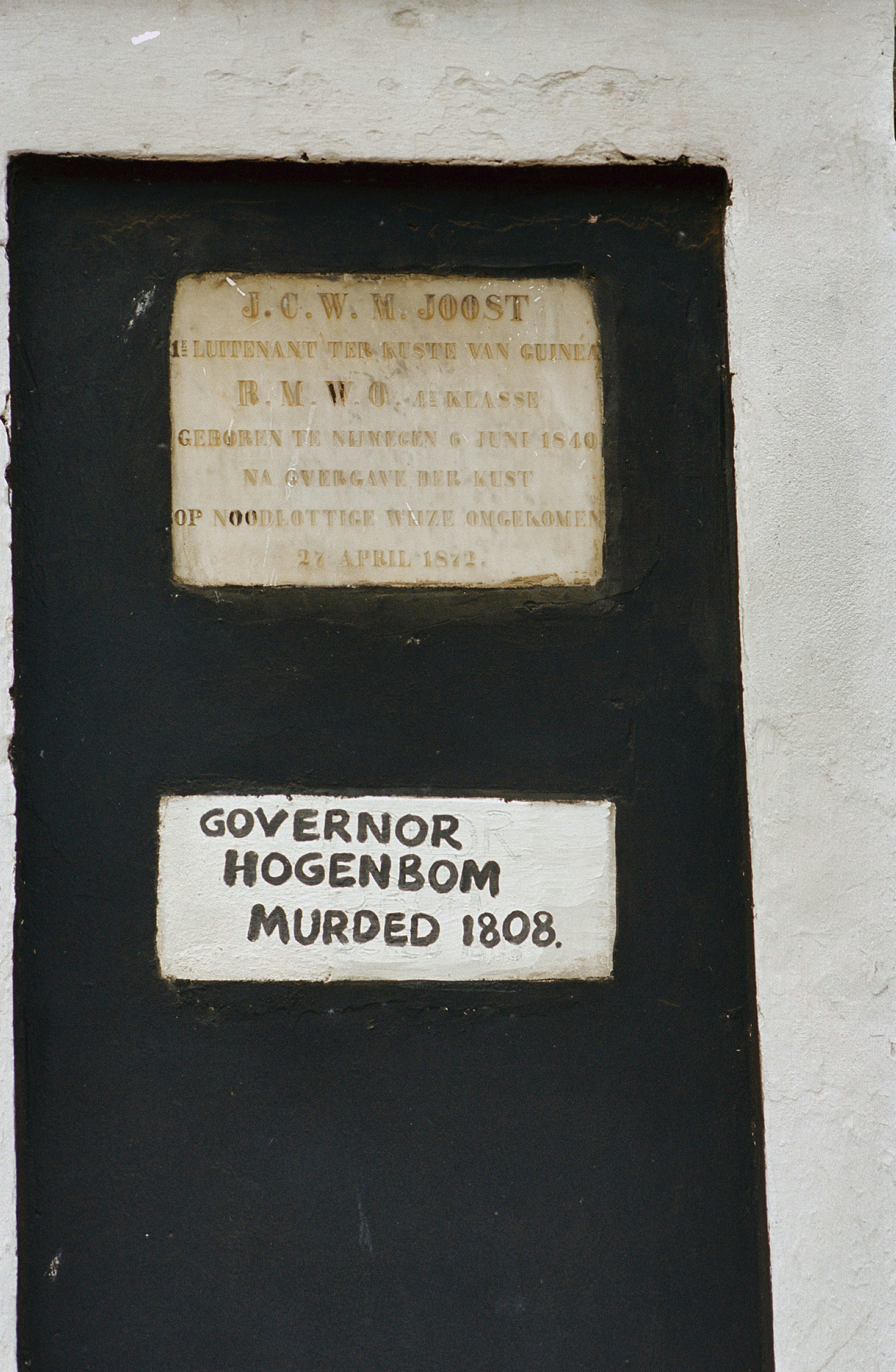
Tomb of Hoogenboom on the Dutch cemetery in Elmina.

Johannes Petrus Hoogenboom was born in Rotterdam to Johannes Hoogenboom and Catharina Schipperheijn. He was baptised on 4 May 1778 in Het Steiger.

He made a career in the colonial administration of the Dutch Gold Coast and became acting governor-general after the death of Pieter Linthorst. During his time in office the Dutch cemetery was constructed. In an ironic twist of fate, Hoogenboom became one of the first people interred in the Dutch cemetery, after he was murdered by an angry mob outside the officer's club in Elmina on 4 August 1808.
