= Willem Godschalck van Focquenbroch =

Dutch poet and playwright

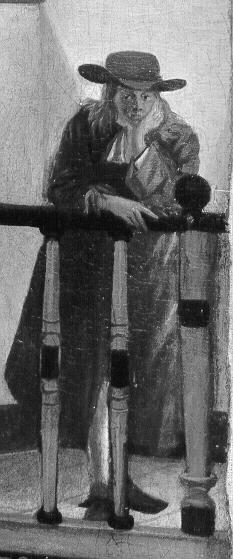
Van Focquenbroch in Elmina

Willem Godschalck van Focquenbroch (1640 – June 1670) was a Dutch poet and playwright. Aside from satirical and burlesque plays and poetry, he also wrote more serious works in a Petrarchic tradition. Whereas there was little attention for Focquenbroch in the nineteenth century, interest in him renewed in the twentieth century.

== Biography ==
Willem Godschalck van Focquenbroch was born in Amsterdam to Paulus van Focquenbroch, a merchant originally from Antwerp, and Catharina Sweers, the daughter of an Antwerp carpenter. He was baptised on 26 April 1640 in the Oude Kerk in Amsterdam.

Focquenbroch studied medicine at the Athenaeum Illustre of Amsterdam. He studied theology with professor Hoornbeek at Leiden University between about 1658 and 1661. His studies in Leiden were sponsored by the Walloon Church. He promoted in 1662 at Utrecht University on research on sexually transmitted diseases. He then worked in Amsterdam as a doctor for the poor. He wrote his first play, "De verwarde jalousy" in 1663. In 1668 however, Focquenbroch applied for a job at the Dutch West India Company. He was designated fiscal on the Dutch Gold Coast. On 17 July 1668, Focquenbroch left for Africa. Two years later, in June 1670, Focquenbroch succumbed to a disease epidemic on the coast.

== Works ==
- "De verwarde jalousy, Blyspel". Amsterdam: Jacob Lescaille, 1663.
- "Klucht van de weyery". Amsterdam: Jacob Vinckel, 1665.
- "Klucht van Hans Keyenvresser". Amsterdam: Jacob Vinckel, 1665.
- "Thalia, of geurige sanggoddin". Amsterdam: Johannes van den Bergh, 1665.
- "Een Hollandsche vuystslagh, op een Brabandsche koon". Z.pl. [1665].
- "Verdubbelt zegensangh, der negen musen". Amsterdam: Johannes van den Bergh, 1666.
- "De herderssangen van Virgilius Maro". Amsterdam: Johannes van den Bergh, 1666.
- "Thalia, of geurige zanggoddin, tweede deel". Amsterdam: Johannes van den Bergh, 1668/1669.
- "Min in't lazarushuys, Blyspel". Amsterdam: Jacob Vinckel, 1674.
- "Afrikaense Thalia, of het derde deel van de geurige zanggodin". Amsterdam: Jan ten Hoorn, 1678.
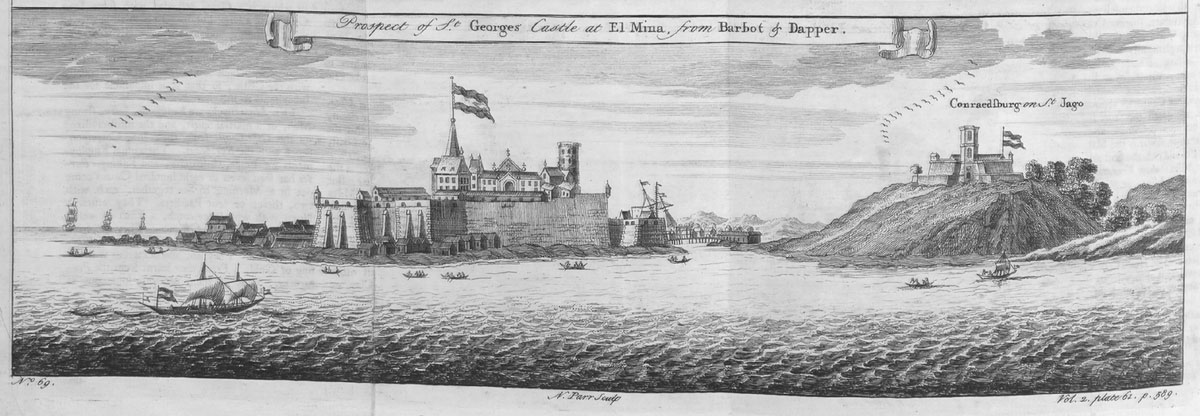
Elmina Castle in Ghana. Focquenbroch worked here for two years.

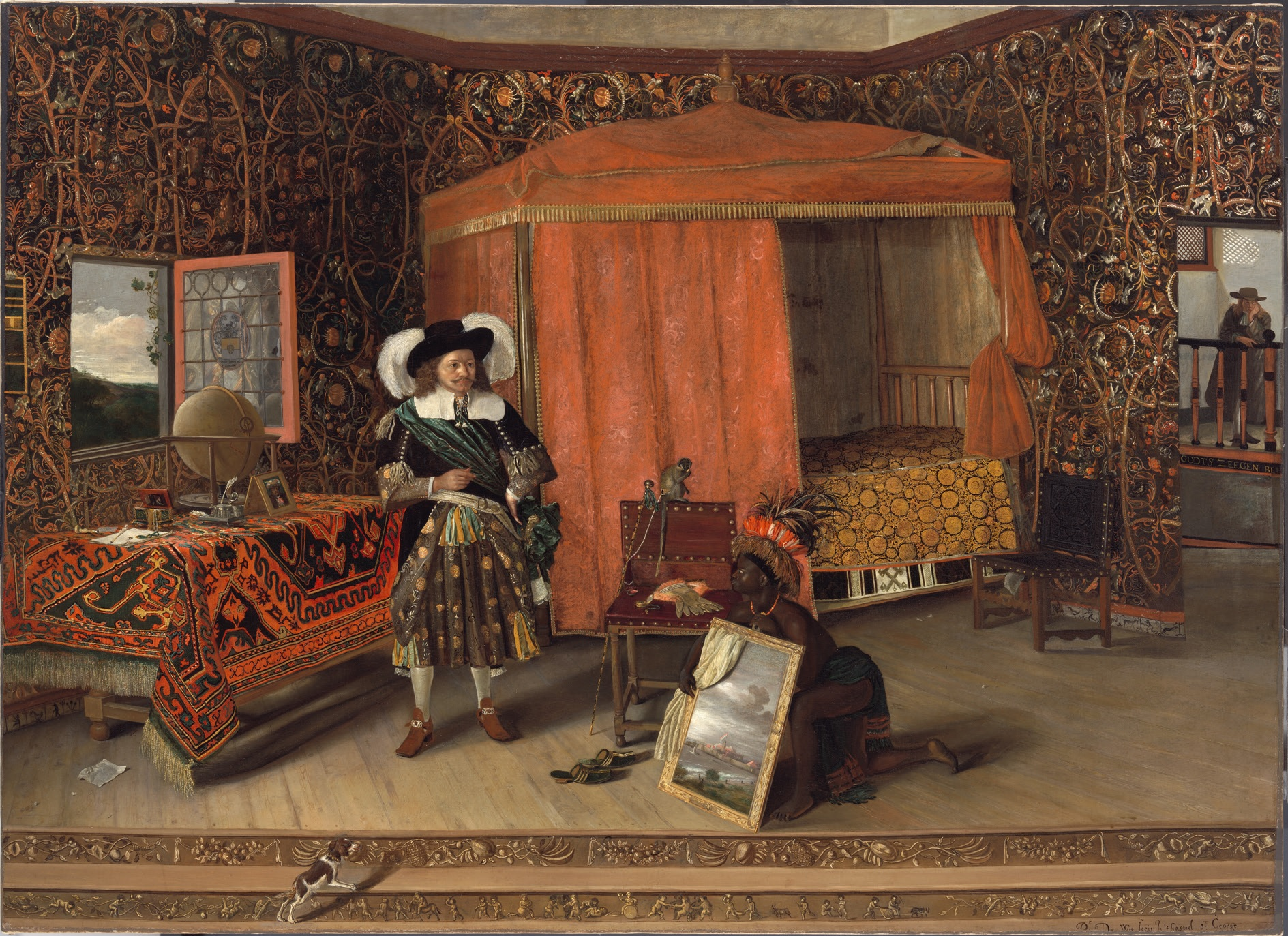
Governor Dirck Wilre at Elmina Castle (1669), with (probably) Focquenbroch standing far right
