= Librecht Jan Temminck =

Dutch colonial administrator

Commander of the Dutch Gold Coast
- ad interim
- In office 14 February 1822 – 6 June 1822
- Monarch: William I of the Netherlands
- Preceded by: Friedrich Last
- Succeeded by: Willem Poolman

Personal details
- Born: c. 1781; Amsterdam, Netherlands
- Died: 22 January 1859 (aged 78); Pati Regency, Central Java, Dutch East Indies
- Spouse: Maria Jacoba Suerdfeger

Librecht Jan Temminck (circa 1781 – 22 January 1859) was a Dutch colonial administrator who served both on the Gold Coast and in the Dutch East Indies.

== Biography ==
Librecht Jan Temminck was born in Amsterdam to Adriaan Matthijs Temminck and Petronella Cornelia Hooreman. He was baptised on 28 January 1781 in the Noorderkerk in Amsterdam.

Temminck married Maria Jacoba Suerdfeger in Hasselt, Overijssel on 19 September 1802. The couple had at least eight children. By 1812, the family was living in Kampen, where Temminck was a police commissioner. For some reason he joined the Dutch colonial administration on the Gold Coast in the early 1820s. After arriving on the Gold Coast on 8 February 1822, he relieved interim commander Friedrich Last of his duties. He was installed on 14 February 1822. Temminck served until Willem Poolman arrived to succeed him.

Temminck seems to have continued his career in the Dutch East Indies. In June 1830, he was made president of the orphans' court in Semarang, after having previously served as head commissioner of police in Batavia. In 1837, Temminck was indicted for "theft of the nation's wealth" (Dutch: landsdieverij) by the procurator fiscal at the Council of Justice in Semarang. He was sentenced to a high fine and banishment from the Dutch East Indies on 2 June 1837. On appeal, the Supreme Court of the Dutch East Indies left the fine in place, but instead of banishing Temminck from the Dutch East Indies, the court declared him "infamous" (Dutch: eerloos) and sentenced him to five years imprisonment. Temminck only had to serve part of his prison sentence and requested king William II of the Netherlands on 20 April 1841 to "remove the stain of infamy" from his record. The king granted this request by royal decree number 62 of 5 July 1842.

Temminck retired in January 1846, and died on 22 January 1859 in Pati Regency, Central Java.
