= Jan Frederik König =

German colonial administrator

Governor-General of the Dutch Gold Coast
- ad interim
- In office 4 August 1808 – 5 March 1810
- Preceded by: Johannes Petrus Hoogenboom
- Succeeded by: Abraham de Veer

Personal details
- Born: Langelsheim, Principality of Brunswick-Wolfenbüttel, Holy Roman Empire
- Died: 17 April 1810; St. George d'Elmina, Dutch Gold Coast

Jan Frederik König (unknown – 17 April 1810) was a colonial administrator on the Gold Coast, who served as acting commander of the Dutch Gold Coast between 4 August 1808 and 23 February 1810.

== Biography ==
Jan Frederik König was born in Langelsheim in the Principality of Brunswick-Wolfenbüttel.

König made a career in the colonial administration of the Dutch Gold Coast, being appointed on 12 May 1801 as resident of Fort Amsterdam at Kormantin. On 13 December 1803 he became commandant of Fort Saint Anthony at Axim. When the acting governor-general Isaac de Roever repatriated to the Batavian Republic to recover from illness on 16 June 1805, König as the most senior resident on the Gold Coast was the logical successor. Instead, Pieter Linthorst was appointed by the Small Council, of which König was not a member. König protested the procedure, but nevertheless accepted the decision made.

After acting governor Johannes Petrus Hoogenboom died on 4 August 1808, König became acting governor-general. During König's time in office, Elmina was attacked by the Fante during the Ga–Fante War. One of the reasons given by the Fante for their attack of Elmina was the activity of Jan Nieser, a Euro-African merchant based in Elmina, whom they accused of inciting the Asante to invade Fante during the Ashanti–Fante War of 1806–1807. The siege was still ongoing when the recently arrived Abraham de Veer was installed as commandant-general on 5 March 1810 to succeed König. De Veer's appointment referred specifically to the disputes among the colonial administrators on the Gold Coast, and it was De Veer's first and foremost task to put an end to these disputes by putting a "new order of business" in place.

König died soon after, on 17 April 1810.
