= Martinus Swarte =

Colonial Administrator

Commander of the Dutch Gold Coast
- ad interim
- In office 29 March 1833 – 11 May 1833
- Monarch: William I of the Netherlands
- Preceded by: Eduard Daniel Leopold van Ingen
- Succeeded by: Christiaan Lans

Personal details
- Born: 13 May 1813; Amsterdam, Netherlands
- Died: 8 April 1835 (aged 21); Nice, Duchy of Savoy

Martinus Swarte (born 13 May 1813 – 8 April 1835) was a Dutch colonial administrator on the Gold Coast. He was interim commander in 1833.

== Biography ==
Martinus Swarte was born in Amsterdam to Franciscus Swarte from Papenburg and Anna Sophia van der Aa from Haarlem. At age 16, on 2 March 1830, Martinus Swarte was appointed assistant on the Dutch Gold Coast. In March 1833, he became acting commander, after the previous acting commander Eduard Daniel Leopold van Ingen had died. He was relieved of his duties on 10 May 1833, when Christiaan Lans arrived from the Netherlands to replace him. At the end of 1833, he went on leave to Europe, but shipwrecked on the way home. Martinus Swarte died in Nice on 8 April 1835, where he was staying to recuperate from his wounds.

== Personal life ==
Swarte married Charlotte Bartels, daughter of Carel Hendrik Bartels around 1833. They had one daughter, Anna Sophia Swarte, who would in 1851 marry the British merchant and mayor of Cape Coast Robert Hutchison.
