= Willem Hendrik Johan van Idsinga =

Dutch politician and colonial official (1822-1896)

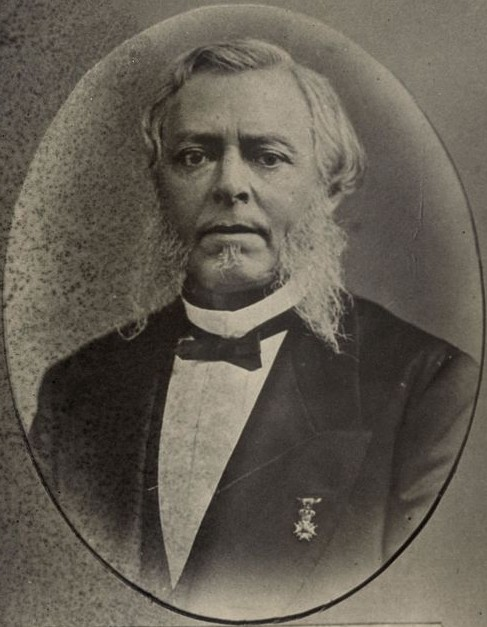

Governor of Suriname
- In office 29 June 1867 – 1 August 1873
- Monarch: William III of the Netherlands
- Preceded by: Reinhart Frans van Lansberge
- Succeeded by: Cornelis Ascanius van Sypesteyn

Governor of the Dutch Gold Coast
- In office 19 February 1866 – 17 April 1867
- Monarch: William III of the Netherlands
- Preceded by: Arent Magnin
- Succeeded by: Georg Pieter Willem Boers

Personal details
- Born: June 25, 1822 Baardwijk, Netherlands
- Died: November 16, 1896 (aged 74) The Hague, Netherlands
- Spouse: Emmeline Theodora Elisabeth van Raders

Willem Hendrik Johan van Idsinga (born 25 June 1822 – 16 November 1896) was a Dutch politician and colonial official, who served as Governor of the Dutch Gold Coast from 1865 to 1867 and as Governor of Surinam between 29 June 1867 and 1 August 1873.

== Biography ==
Van Idzinga was born in Baardwijk, the Netherlands, to Hendrik van Idsinga, a pastor, and Joanna Elisabeth van Nimwegen. He made a career in the Royal Netherlands Navy, where he was a second lieutenant.

In his late twenties, Van Idzinga began his political career in the colonies, first becoming landdrost of the district of Nickerie in Surinam between 1850 and 1853, before becoming Lieutenant Governor (Dutch: gezaghebber) of Sint Eustatius (1853–1859) and Sint Maarten (1859–1865).

In 1865, he was first promoted to the rank of Governor, in the rather dilapidated colony of the Dutch Gold Coast. In 1867, he was appointed Governor of Surinam.

== Personal life ==
He married Emmeline Theodora Elisabeth van Raders, daughter of former Governor of Surinam Reinier Frederik van Raders, on 31 October 1849 in Paramaribo, Surinam. They had two sons and one daughter. Dutch politician Johan Willem Herman Meyert van Idsinga was one of their sons.
