= Jan Valckenburgh =

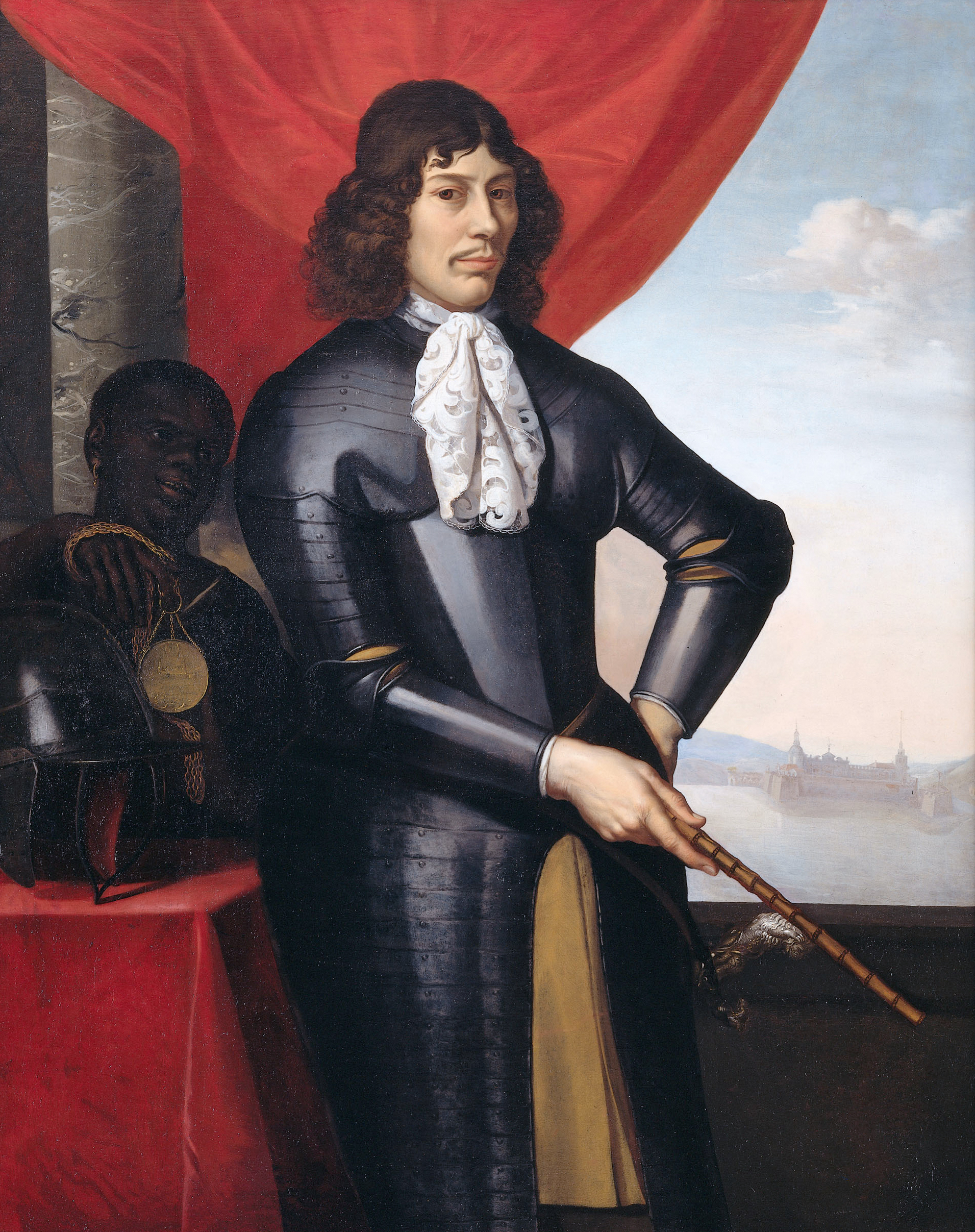

Director-General of the Dutch Gold Coast
- In office 23 December 1662 – 2 June 1667
- Preceded by: Dirck Wilre
- Succeeded by: Huybert van Ongerdonk
- In office 24 January 1656 – 27 April 1659
- Preceded by: Jacob Ruyghaver
- Succeeded by: Casper van Heussen

Personal details
- Born: 1623 Amsterdam, Netherlands
- Died: 8 July 1667 (aged 43–44) Elmina, Dutch Gold Coast
- Spouse: Dina Lems

Jan Valckenburgh (1623 – 8 July 1667) was a civil servant of the Dutch West India Company. Valckenburgh began as a simple assistant-trader, but managed to make career up to one of the highest ranks, that of Director-General of the Dutch Gold Coast, twice.

== Biography ==
Born into a family of modest means, Valckenburg was baptized in the Oude Kerk in Amsterdam on 2 April 1623. His father, Paulus Paulusz Valckenburgh was a basket weaver from Geleen, his mother Geertje Lamberts a housewife.

Valckenburgh became a commissioner in food supplies in Luanda in 1643 and returned to Amsterdam in 1649, after the recapture of Luanda by the Portuguese. It is likely that he married the same year to Dina Lems from Flushing, a daughter of former Governor of Dutch Brazil and later Luanda, Adriaen Lems.

Valckenburgh returned to West-Africa in 1652 when he was installed as fiscal on the Gold Coast. In Elmina, he had a relationship with mulatto Helena Correa, who was also the mistress of the previous Director-General. A son from this relationship was born in 1653. Three years later, Valckenburgh himself became Director-General.

After the end of his first term, Valkenburgh returned to Amsterdam in 1659, where he bought Keizersgracht number 113, becoming a neighbour of his Gold Coast colleague Hendrik Carloff. In 1660, his son Jacobus was born, and in 1662, his daughter Cornelia. On 5 September 1662, he left Amsterdam again, however, for his second term as Director-General on the Gold Coast. Due to kidney problems, he was relieved of his duties on 2 June 1667, and a month later, on 8 July, Valckenburgh died.

== Portrait ==
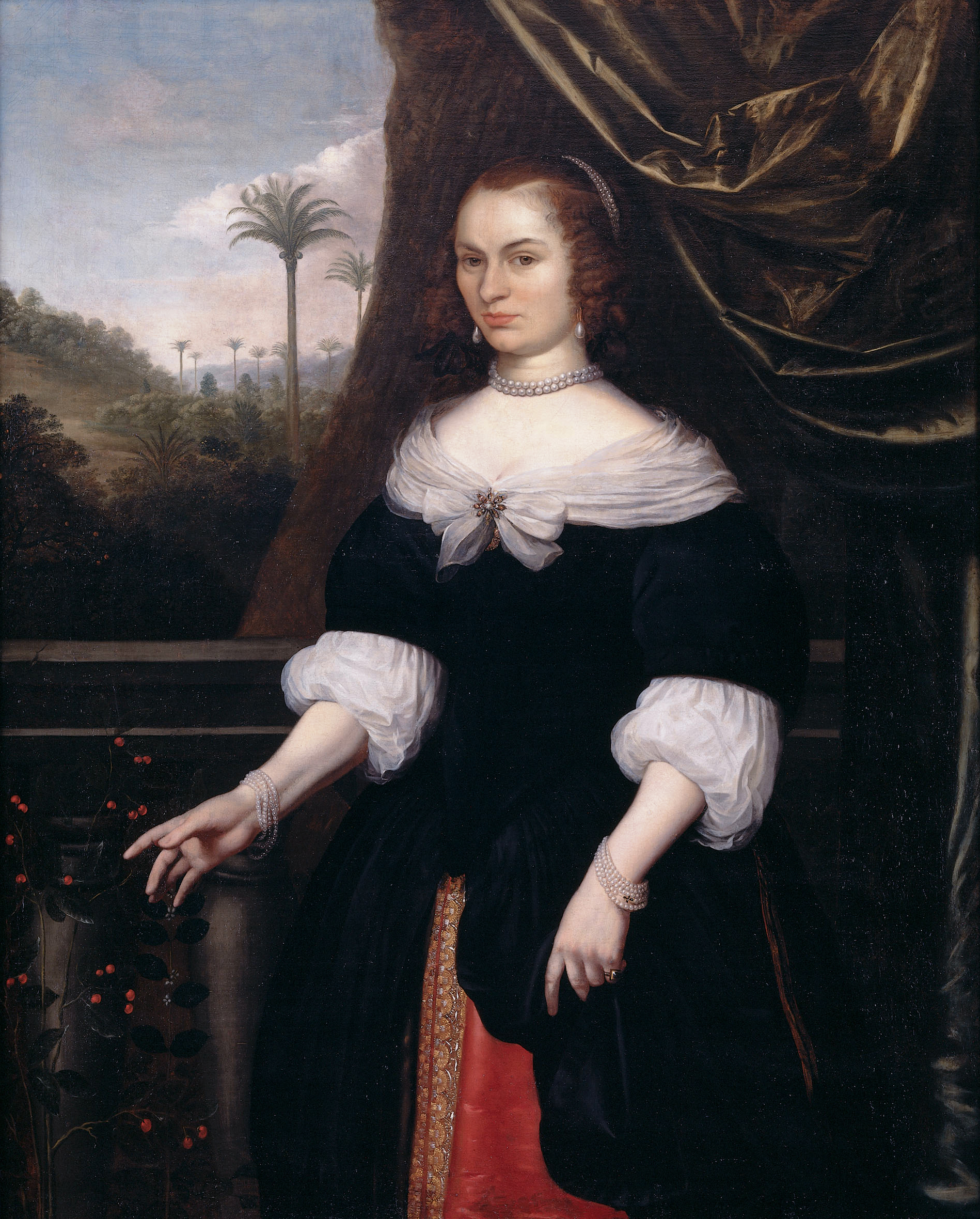
Valckenburgh's wife Dina Lems by Daniel Vertangen.

During his leave in Amsterdam between 1659 and 1662, Valckenburgh commissioned a portrait of himself and his wife with the painter Daniel Vertangen. In 2002 it was considered the only painting of a Director-General of the Gold Goast in service of the Dutch West India Company, but a portrait of Director-General Jan Pranger has been identified since as well. He is painted with a black house slave and with Fort Elmina on the background.

Both portraits were bought by the Rijksmuseum in Amsterdam in 2002.
