= Jacob Ruychaver =

Dutch trader

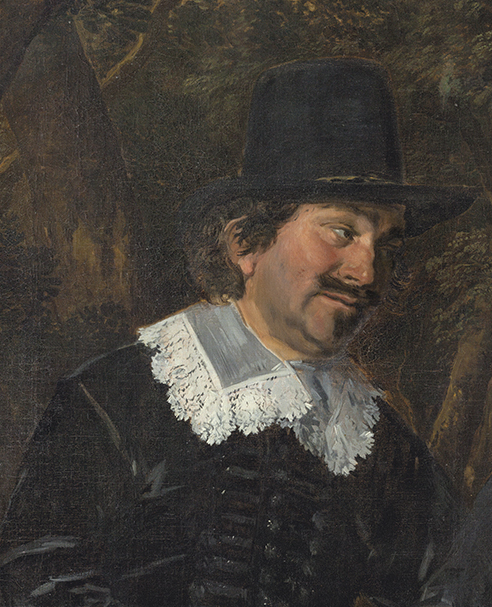

Director-General of the Dutch Gold Coast
- In office 6 January 1641 – 18 December 1645
- Preceded by: Arent Jacobzen van Amersfoort
- Succeeded by: Jacob van der Wel
- In office 15 March 1651 – 24 January 1656
- Preceded by: Arent Cocq
- Succeeded by: Jan Valkenburgh

Personal details
- Born: ca. 1620 Haarlem, Dutch Republic
- Died: 24 January 1656 Elmina, Dutch Gold Coast
- Spouse: Maria Hendrixs

Jacob Ruychaver (c. 1620 – 24 January 1656) was a Dutch trader in the service of the Dutch West India Company, who rose to the rank of Director-General of the Dutch Gold Coast twice.

== Biography ==
Jacob Ruychaver was born in Haarlem to Willem Ruychaver and Geertruijd de Bam Pietersdochter. Jacob's grandfather Maarten Ruychaver had been a member of the council of the city of Haarlem between 1602 and 1618.

Ruychaver made career in the administration of the Dutch Gold Coast. In 1639, he was appointed second in command to Director-General Arent Jacobzen van Amersfoort. After Van Amersfoort's death in January 1641, Ruychaver took over control of the Gold Coast. During his term in office, Ruychaver oversaw the conquest of the last Portuguese fort on the Gold Coast, Fort Saint Anthony, in 1642.

Ruychaver resigned from office in November 1645 and travelled via São Tomé and Brazil back to the Dutch Republic. On 31 August 1646, Jacob Ruychaver followed in his grandfather's footsteps by also becoming a member of the council of the city of Haarlem.

In 1650, Ruychaver returned to the Gold Coast for a second term as director-general. During his second term, Fort Ruychaver was established in the Gold Coast interior in an attempt to access the gold trade more directly. Ruychaver died in Elmina on 24 January 1656.

== Portrait by Frans Hals ==
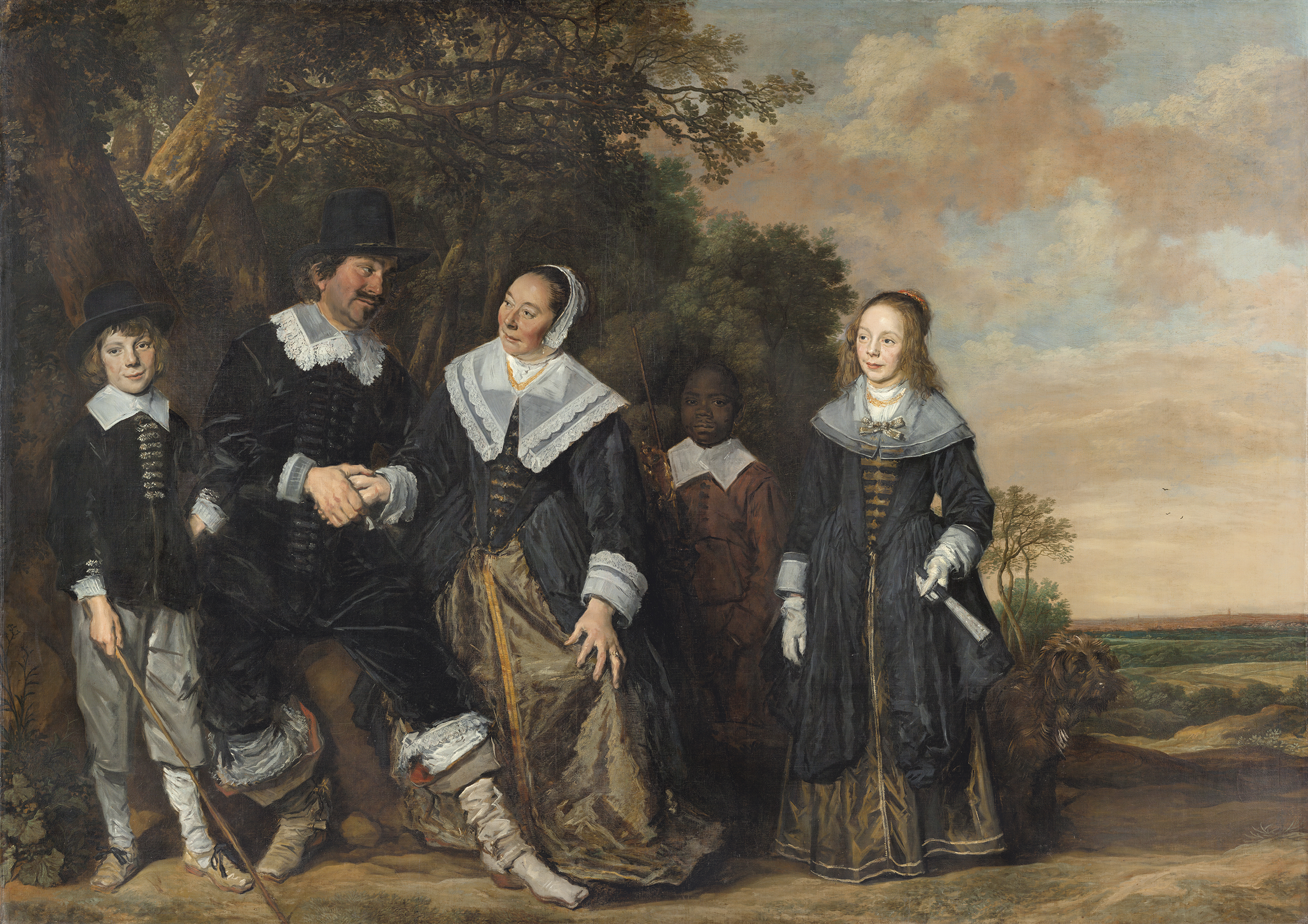
Frans Hals, Family Group in a Landscape.

Between 1645 and 1648, the Haarlem painter Frans Hals painted a portrait featuring what seems to be a Dutch family with two children and a servant of African descent. According to Ineke Mok and Dineke Stam, it is likely that the family portrayed is that of Jacob Ruychaver and his wife Maria Hendrixs. Their daughter Geertruid (1633–1710) and son Willem (1634–1673) fit the age of the children displayed on the painting. It was common for former directors-general of the Gold Coast to commission a painting with an African servant (compare Ruychaver's successor Jan Valckenburgh).
