= List of colonial governors of the Dutch Gold Coast =

This article lists the colonial governors of the Dutch Gold Coast. During the Dutch presence on the Gold Coast, which lasted from 1598 to 1872, the title of the head of the colonial government changed several times:

- 1675–1798: Director-General (Dutch: directeur-generaal)
- 1798–1810: Governor-General (Dutch: gouverneur-generaal)
- 1810–1815: Commandant-General (Dutch: commandant-generaal)
- 1815–1819: Governor-General (Dutch: gouverneur-generaal)
- 1819–1838: Commander (Dutch: kommandeur)
- 1838–1872: Governor (Dutch: gouverneur)

== List ==
Dates in italics indicate de facto continuation of office.

=== Direct Dutch rule (1612–1621) ===
Before the establishment of the Dutch West India Company on 3 June 1621, Dutch traders nominally were at the direct control of the Dutch government. Initially, the regulation of trade was left to the traders themselves, but after the building of Fort Nassau at Mouri in 1612, a general was installed to administrate the new colony.

Name	Title	Took office	Left office	Notes
Jacob Adriaensz Clantius	General of the Coast	1612	1614	
A.J. Roest	General of the Coast	1614	?	
Arent Jacobzen van Amersfoort	General of the Coast	?	?	

=== Dutch West India Company rule (1621–1791) ===
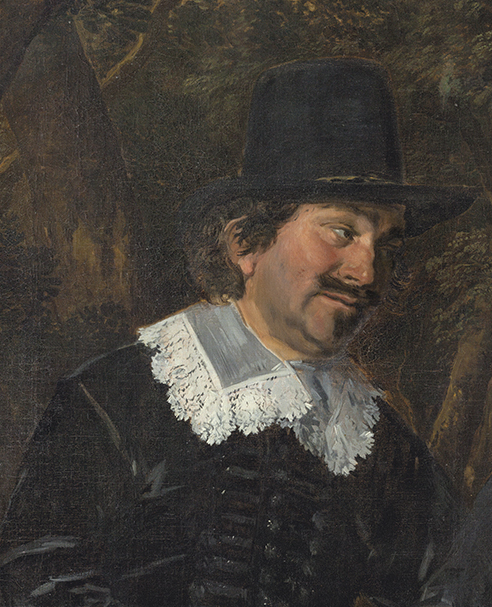
Director-General Jacob Ruychaver (1641–1645; 1651–1656).

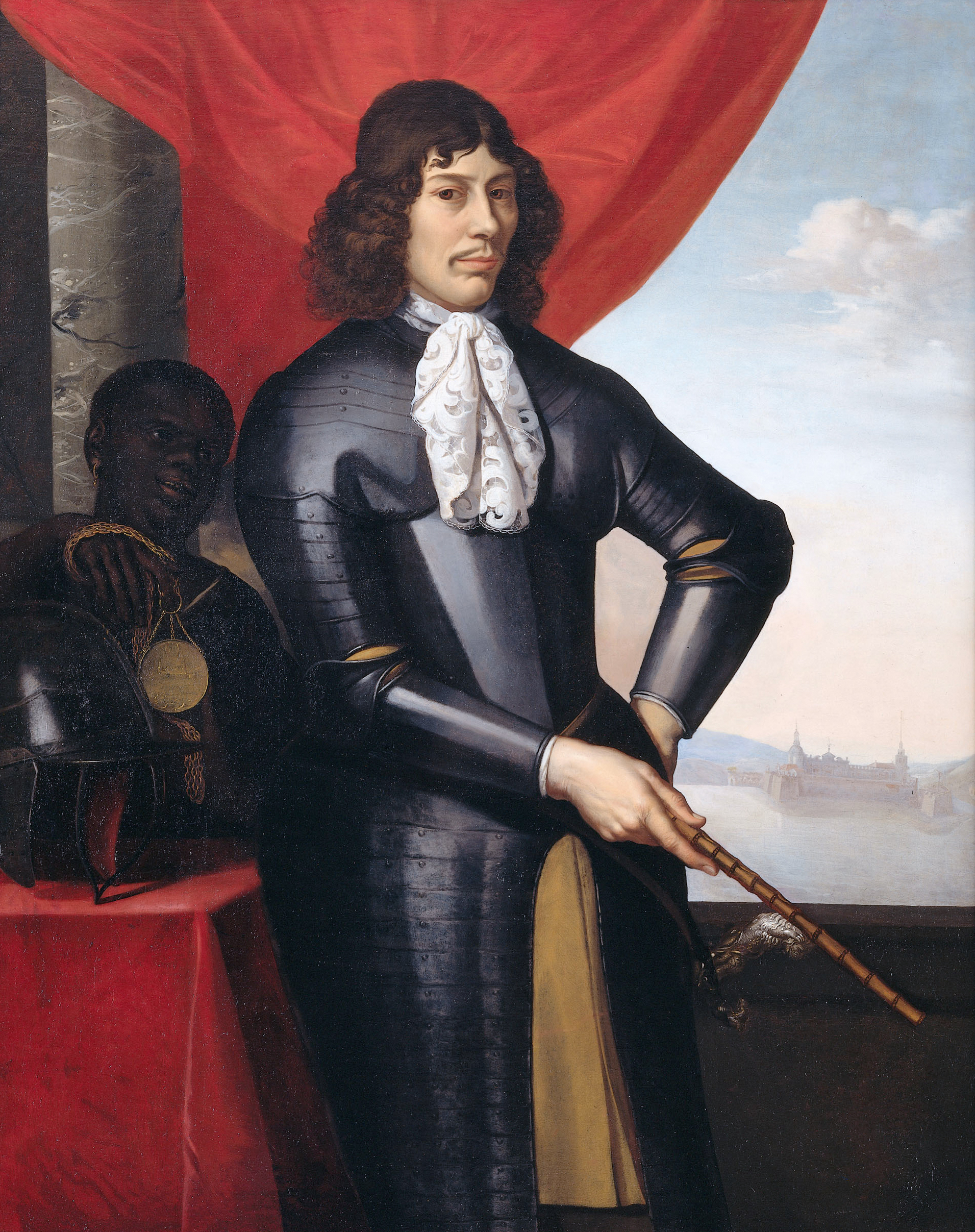
Director-General Jan Valkenburgh (1656–1659; 1662–1667).

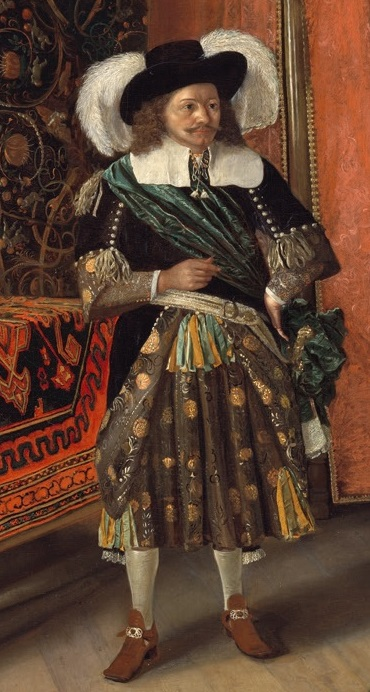
Director-General Dirck Wilre (1662; 1668–1674).

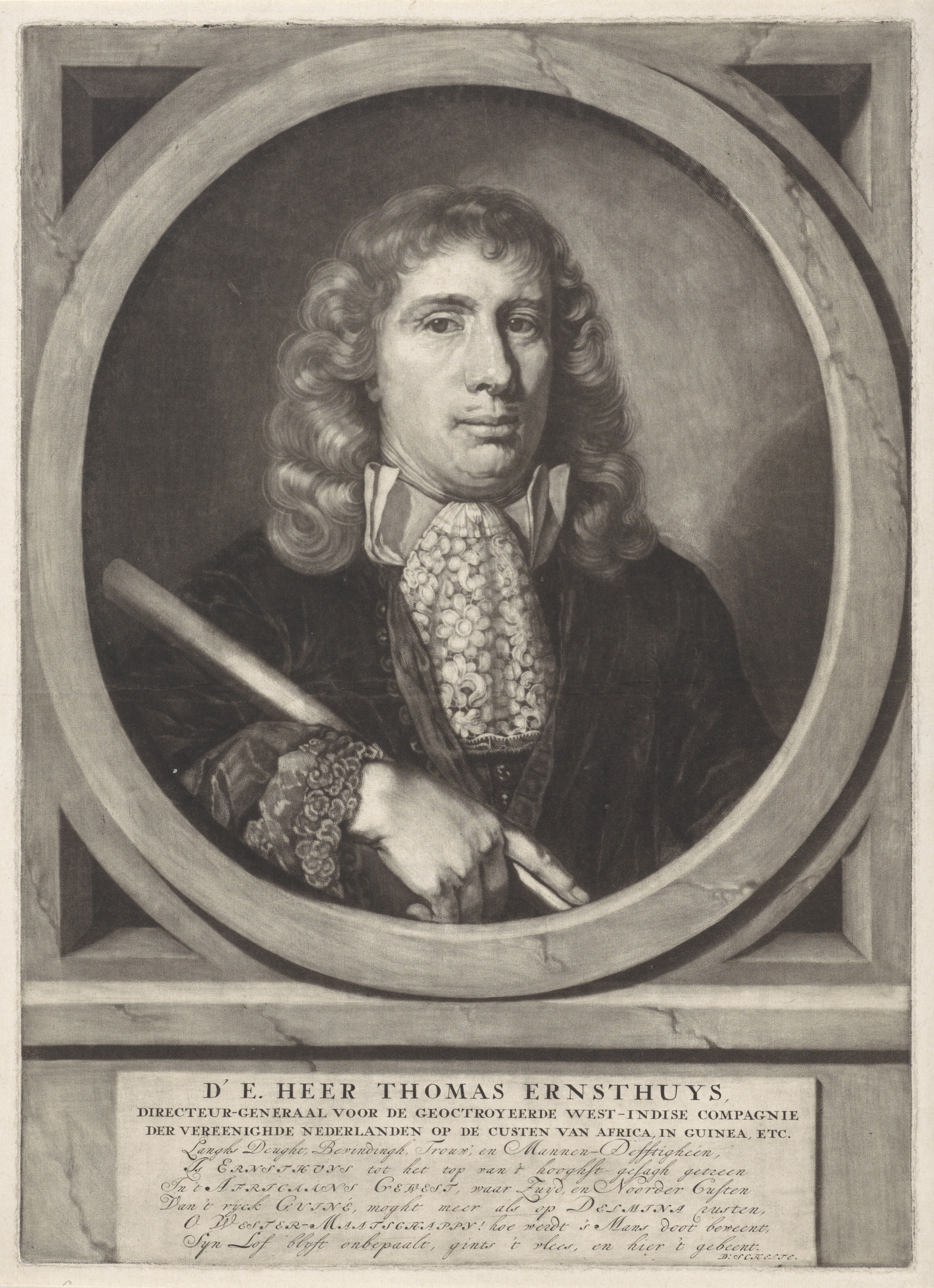
Director-General Thomas Ernsthuys (1682–1684).

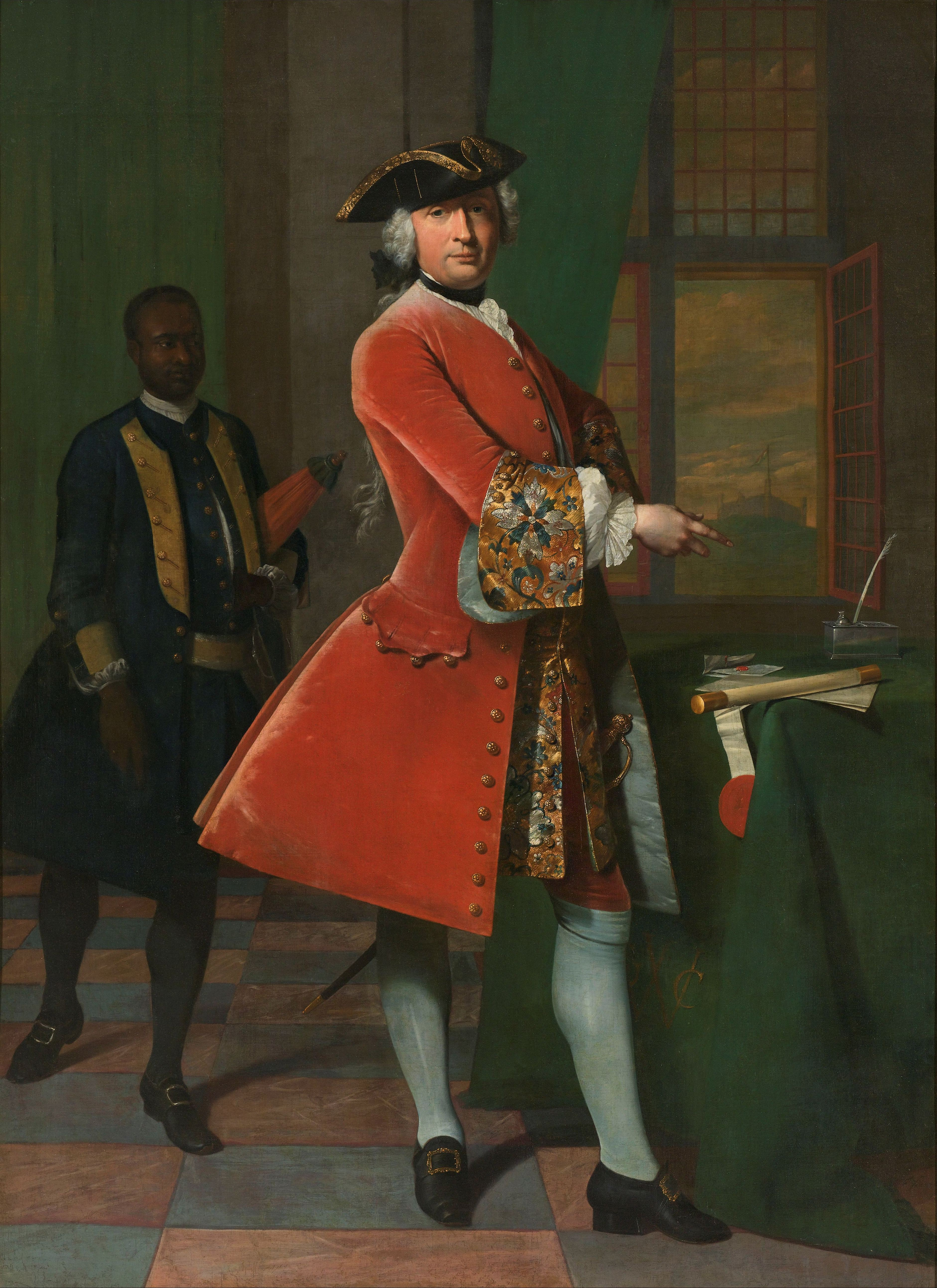
Director-General Jan Pranger (1730–1734).

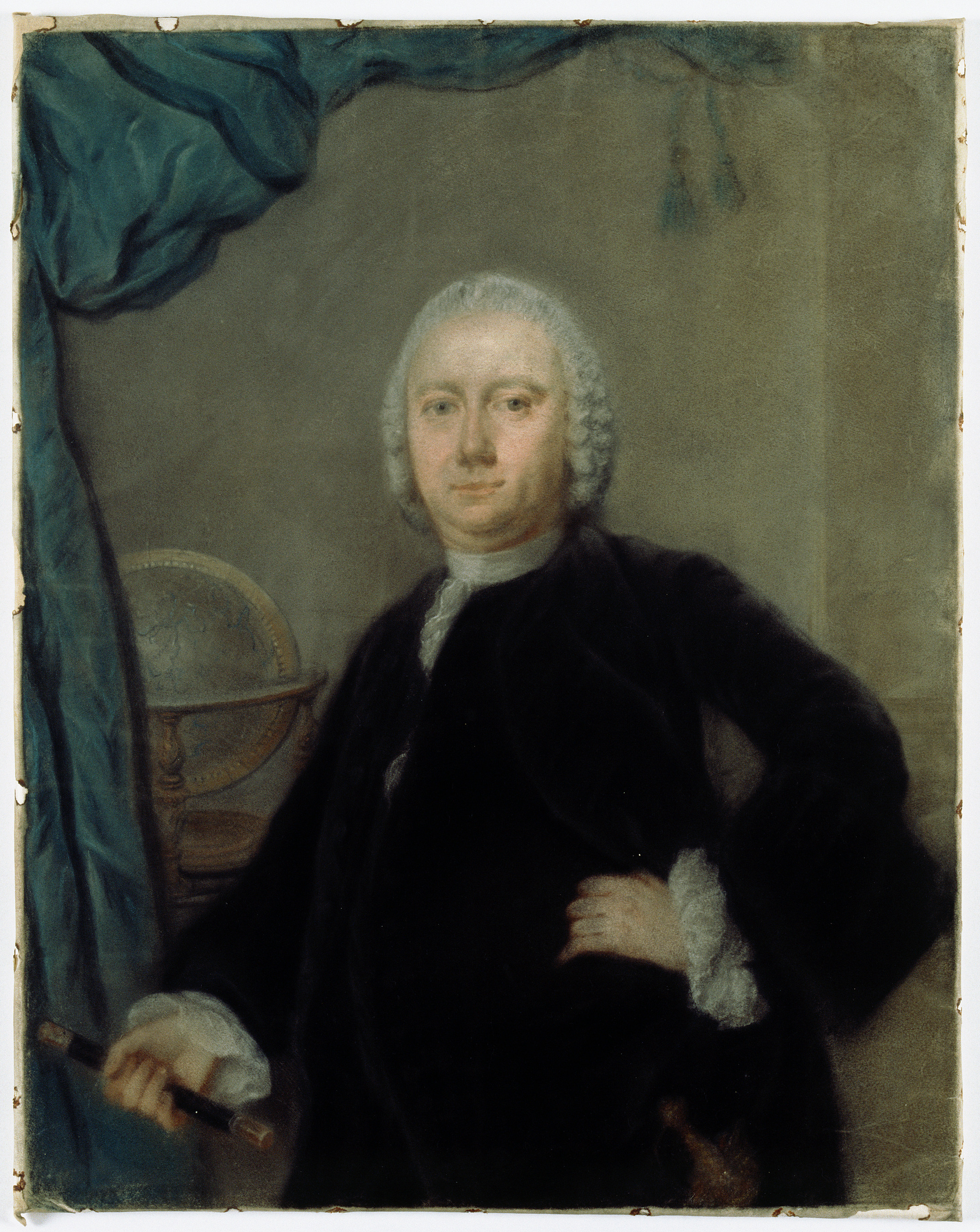
Director-General Jan van Voorst (1747-1754).

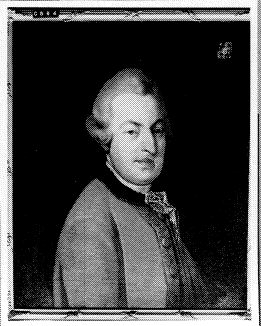
Director-General Lambert Jacob van Tets (1758).

There are many lists available of Director-Generals of the Gold Coast in service of the Dutch West India Company, all with slightly conflicting names and dates. The most accurate information is available for the eighteenth century, as Harvey Feinberg compiled a list of Director-Generals of that century on the basis of day registries available at the Nationaal Archief.

Name	Title	Took office	Left office	Notes
Arent Jacobsz. van Amersfoort	Director-General	1624	1631	Based at Fort Nassau, Mouri
Jan Jochemsz. Sticker	Director-General	1631	1635	Based at Fort Nassau, Mouri
Pompeius de la Sale	Director-General	1635	1637	Based at Fort Nassau, Mouri
Nicolaes van Yperen	Director-General	1637	18 July 1639	Based at Fort George, Elmina, from 1637
Arend Jacobszoon Montfort	Director-General	18 July 1639	6 January 1641	
Jacob Ruychaver	Director-General	6 January 1641	18 December 1645	1st term
Jacob van der Wel	Director-General	18 December 1645	9 April 1650	
Hendrik Doedens	Director-General	9 April 1650	11 June 1650	
Arent Cocq	Governor	11 June 1650	15 March 1651	
Jacob Ruychaver	Director-General	15 March 1651	24 January 1656	2nd term
Johannes van Valkenburgh	Director-General	24 January 1656	27 April 1659	1st term
Jasper van Heussen	Director-General	27 April 1659	7 April 1662	
Dirck Wilré	Director-General	7 April 1662	23 December 1662	1st term
Johannes van Valkenburgh	Director-General	23 December 1662	2 June 1667	2nd term
Huybert van Ongerdonk	Governor	2 June 1667	12 December 1668	
Dirck Wilré	Director-General	12 December 1668	12 June 1675	2nd term
Johan Root	Director-General	12 June 1675	13 September 1676	
Abraham Meermans	Director-General	13 September 1676	26 March 1680	
Daniël Verhoutert	Director-General	26 March 1680	10 April 1682	
Thomas Ernsthuys	Director-General	10 April 1682	28 June 1684	
Nikolas de Sweerts	Director-General	15 July 1685	29 January 1690	
Joël Smits	Director-General	29 January 1690	25 March 1694	
Jan Staphorst	Director-General	25 March 1694	9 June 1696	
Joan van Sevenhuijsen	Director-General	9 June 1696	16 May 1702	
Willem de la Palma	Director-General	16 May 1702	17 October 1705	Died in office
Pieter Nuyts	Director-General	23 October 1705	26 September 1708	Died in office
Henrico van Wesel	Governor	26 September 1708	13 July 1709	
Adriaan Schoonheijd	Director-General	13 July 1709	15 March 1711	Died in office
Hieronimus Haring	Director-General	16 March 1711	12 May 1716	
Abraham Engelgraaf-Robbertszoon	Director-General	12 May 1716	11 March 1718	
Willem Butler	Director-General	12 March 1718	25 September 1722	
Abraham Houtman	Director-General	25 September 1722	17 May 1723	Died in office
Mattheus de Crane	Governor	17 May 1723	14 December 1723	
Pieter Valkenier	Director-General	14 December 1723	6-7 March 1727	
Robert Norre	Director-General	7 March 1727	6 March 1730	
Jan Pranger	Director-General	6 March 1730	13 March 1734	
Antonius van Overbeke	Director-General	13 March 1734	2 April 1736	Died in office
Martinus François de Bordes	Director-General	7 April 1736	16 March 1740	Died in office
François Barovius	Governor	17 March 1740	8 March 1741	
Baron Jacob de Petersen	Director-General	8 March 1741	10-12 April 1747	
Jan van Voorst	Director-General	10-12 April 1747	14 July 1754	
Nicolas Mattheus van der Nood de Gietere	Director-General	14 July 1754	24 October 1755	Died in office
Roelof Ulzen	Governor	24 October 1755	15 January 1758	
Lambert Jacob van Tets	Director-General	15 January 1758	12 March 1758	Died in office
Jan Pieter Theodoor Huydecoper	President of the Council	22 March 1758	5 October 1760	1st Term
David Pieter Erasmie	Director-General	5 October 1760	19 July 1763	Died in office
Hendrick Walmbeek	Governor	24 July 1763	10 September 1764	
Jan Pieter Theodoor Huydecoper	Director-General	10 September 1764	11 July 1767	2nd Term; died in office
Willem Sulyard van Leefdael and Cornelis Klok	President of the Council	11 July 1767	27 August 1767	Both acting ad interim until Woortman arrived at Elmina
Pieter Woortman	Director-General	27 August 1767	14 April 1780	Died in office
Jacobus van der Puije	President of the Council	10 May 1780	30 December 1780	
Pieter Volkmar	Director-General	30 December 1780	12 March 1784	
Gilles Servaas Galle	President of the Council	15 March 1784	14 February 1785	1st Term
Adolph Thierens	Director-General	14 February 1785	26 May 1786	Died in office
Gilles Servaas Galle	President of the Council	2 June 1786	24 August 1787	2nd Term; died in office
Lieve van Bergen van der Grijp	President of the Council	27 August 1787	11-14 March 1790	1st Term
Jacobus Adriaan de Veer	Director-General	11-14 March 1790	31 December 1791	Dutch West India Company liquidated 31 December 1791

=== Direct Dutch rule (1792–1872) ===
The Dutch West India Company was dissolved in 1791, and its colonies reverted to the rule of the States-General of the Dutch Republic on 1 January 1792. The last Director-General installed by the Dutch West India Company, Jacobus de Veer, became the first Director-General under the direct authority of the Dutch Republic. The Dutch Republic was succeeded by the Batavian Republic and the Kingdom of Holland, which all inherited the rule over the colony.

Although the Kingdom of Holland was incorporated into the First French Empire, the colony on the Gold Coast was never occupied by either France or Great-Britain. Dutch rule continued under the Kingdom of the Netherlands proclaimed in 1815, until the cession of the possessions on the Gold Coast to the United Kingdom in 1872.

Denotes service as acting governor.

Title	Portrait	Name	Tenure	
Title	Portrait	Name	Took office	Left office
Director-General		Jacobus Adriaan de Veer	1 January 1792	5 May 1794
–		Lieve van Bergen van der Grijp	5 May 1794	10 January 1795
Governor		Otto Arnoldus Duim	10 January 1795	2 June 1796
–		Lieve van Bergen van der Grijp	2 June 1796	21 August 1796
Director-General		Gerhardus Hubertus van Hamel	21 August 1796	1 May 1798
Governor-General		Cornelius Ludwich Bartels; Promoted to Governor-General on 12 August 1801	8 May 1798	28 April 1804
–		Isaac de Roever	28 April 1804	15 June 1805
Governor-General		Pieter Linthorst; Acting until 5 August 1805	16 June 1805	21 July 1807
–		Johannes Petrus Hoogenboom	21 July 1807	11 August 1808
–		Jan Frederik König	12 August 1808	5 March 1810
Commandant-General		Abraham de Veer	5 March 1810	11 March 1816
Governor-General		Herman Willem Daendels	11 March 1816	2 May 1818
Commander		Frans Christiaan Eberhard Oldenburg; Acting until 1 November 1819	2 May 1818	2 January 1820
–		Johannes Oosthout	10 January 1820	29 August 1821
–		Friedrich Last	31 August 1821	14 February 1822
–		Librecht Jan Temminck	14 February 1822	6 June 1822
Commander		Willem Poolman	6 June 1822	14 June 1823
–		Hendrik Adriaan Mouwe	27 June 1823	11 February 1824
–		Johan David Carel Pagenstecher	17 February 1824	24 February 1824
–		Friedrich Last	24 February 1824	3 January 1826
–		Jacobus van der Breggen Paauw	3 January 1826	26 November 1827
Commander		Friedrich Last	26 November 1827	28 April 1832
–		Jan Tieleman Jacobus Cremer	28 April 1832	1 July 1832
–		Eduard Daniel Leopold van Ingen	1 July 1832	16 March 1833
–		Martinus Swarte	29 March 1833	11 May 1833
Commander		Christiaan Lans	11 May 1833	2 December 1836
–		Hendrik Tonneboeijer	2 December 1836	28 October 1837
–		Anthony van der Eb	29 October 1837	5 August 1838
Governor		Hendrik Bosch	5 August 1838	7 March 1840
Governor		Anthony van der Eb	11 March 1840	9 June 1846
–		Willem George Frederik Derx; Acting during the European leave of Van der Eb	9 June 1846	10 July 1847
Governor		Anthony van der Eb; Resumed office upon return from Europe	10 July 1847	21 September 1852
Governor		Hero Schomerus; Acting until 20 January 1853	21 September 1852	25 September 1856
–		Petrus Jacobus Runckel	25 September 1856	6 November 1856
–		Willem George Frederik Derx	6 November 1856	29 April 1857
Governor		Jules van den Bossche	29 April 1857	9 September 1857
Governor		Cornelis Nagtglas; Acting until 21 June 1858	9 September 1857	7 May 1860
–		Cornelis Meeuwsen; Acting during the European leave of Nagtglas	7 May 1860	21 January 1861
Governor		Cornelis Nagtglas; Resumed office upon return from Europe	21 January 1861	23 June 1862
Governor		Henri Alexander Elias	18 October 1862	12 March 1864
–		Carel van Hien; Acting during the European leave of Elias	12 March 1864	13 June 1864
–		Hendrik Doijer; Acting during the European leave of Elias	13 June 1864	7 December 1864
Governor		Henri Alexander Elias; Resumed office upon return from Europe	7 December 1864	4 May 1865
–		Arent Magnin	4 May 1865	19 February 1866
Governor		Willem Hendrik Johan van Idsinga	19 February 1866	17 April 1867
Governor		George Pieter Willem Boers	17 April 1867	15 May 1869
Governor		Cornelis Nagtglas	15 May 1869	8 June 1871
–		Jan Albert Hendrik Hugenholtz	8 June 1871	17 September 1871
–		Johannes Wirix	17 September 1871	28 October 1871
–		Willem Le Jeune	28 October 1871	15 November 1871
Lieutenant Governor		Jan Helenus Ferguson	15 November 1871	6 April 1872

== See also ==
- Ghana
  - Heads of State of Ghana
  - Heads of Government of Ghana
- Gold Coast
  - Colonial Heads of Ghana (Gold Coast)
  - Colonial Heads of Danish Gold Coast
- Lists of office holders
