= Hendrik Adriaan Mouwe =

Dutch colonial administrator

Commander of the Dutch Gold Coast
- ad interim
- In office 27 June 1823 – 11 February 1824
- Monarch: William I of the Netherlands
- Preceded by: Willem Poolman
- Succeeded by: Johan David Carel Pagenstecher

Personal details
- Born: 9 March 1799 Amsterdam, Netherlands
- Died: 11 February 1824 (aged 24) Elmina, Dutch Gold Coast

Hendrik Adriaan Mouwe (born 9 March 1799 – 11 February 1824) was a Dutch colonial administrator who served as acting commander of the Dutch Gold Coast.

== Biography ==
Hendrik Adriaan Mouwe was born in Amsterdam to Hendrik Adriaan Mouwe senior and Johanna Harbers. He was baptised on 24 March 1799 in the Westerkerk in Amsterdam.

He was appointed assistant on the Dutch Gold Coast in 1817 and promoted to commandant of Fort Saint Anthony in Axim on 5 September 1821. He became acting commander of the Dutch Gold Coast on 27 June 1823. He remained in office until his death on 11 February 1824.
