= Udo Last =

Dutch jurist

Frans Friedrich Ludwig Ulrich Last
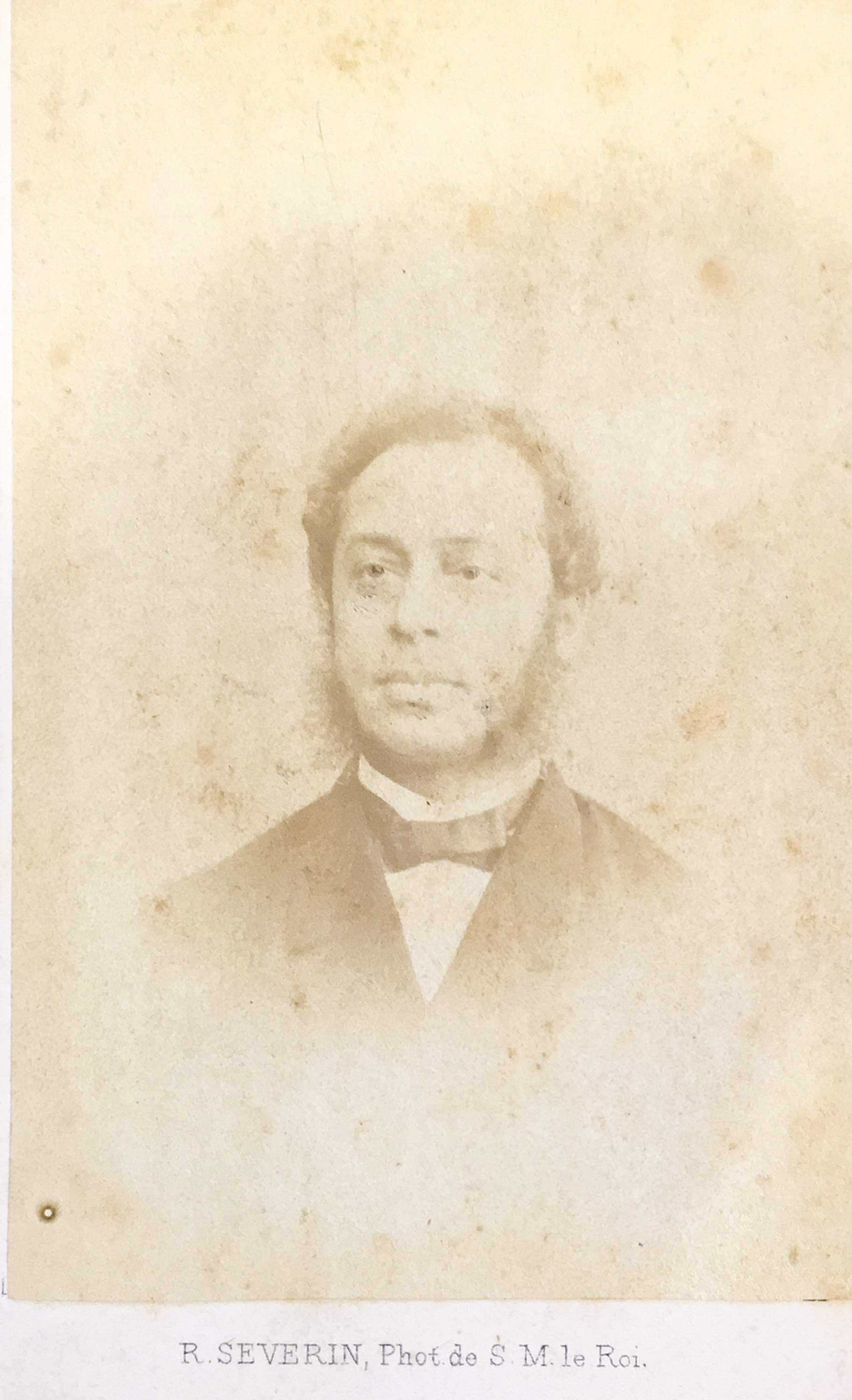

Attorney General at the Supreme Court of the Dutch East Indies
- In office 23 April 1878 – 12 April 1879
- Preceded by: Meinard Pieter Antonie Coster
- Succeeded by: Jan Sibenius Trip
- In office 20 October 1872 – 7 March 1875
- Preceded by: Meinard Pieter Antonie Coster
- Succeeded by: Meinard Pieter Antonie Coster

Personal details
- Born: 1 July 1822 Elmina, Dutch Gold Coast
- Died: 10 March 1883 (aged 60) The Hague, Netherlands

Frans Friedrich Ludwig Ulrich "Udo" Last (1 July 1822 – 10 March 1883) was a Dutch jurist who served as Attorney General (Dutch: procureur-generaal) at the Supreme Court of the Dutch East Indies.

== Biography ==
Udo Last was born in Elmina to colonial administrator Friedrich Last and the Euro-African innkeeper Elisabeth Atteveld. He grew up in Kampen, where he lived with his stepmother Petronella Johanna Aleida van Vlierden.

Udo Last gained a doctorate at the University of Groningen on 8 November 1845, and was on 31 December 1848 appointed official first class (Dutch: ambtenaar eerste klasse) in the Dutch East Indies, and subsequently installed as court clerk (Dutch: griffier) at the Circuit Court (Dutch: Rechtbank van Ommegang) on Java. On 12 February 1850, he was promoted to substitute officer at the Council of Justice in Surabaya. He was moved to the Council of Justice in Batavia in February 1852, and became a full member of that council on 13 August 1852. On 28 April 1854 a promotion to advocate-general at the Supreme Court of the Dutch East Indies followed. On 26 May 1858, Udo Last was appointed judge at the said court. Udo Last published a compendium of Dutch East Indies law in 1860, and a revised second edition in 1872. Between April 1864 and November 1865, Last was on European leave.

Upon his return to the Dutch East Indies, Last was instructed on 27 June 1866 to draft a penal code for natives and non-Europeans in the Dutch East Indies, based on the penal code for Europeans adopted earlier that year. Last was not convinced of his mandate however, and argued in a letter to the Governor-General that the penal code for Europeans, which in turn was based on the Napoleonic French penal code, was unsuitable for implementation in Javanese society. As a consequence, Last was relieved of his task in 1868. He had already again been appointed judge at the supreme court on 23 April 1867. In August 1869, Last was appointed president of the Council of Justice of Batavia, and in October 1872, he returned to the supreme court as Attorney General. On 12 April 1879, Last returned to Europe due to illness.

Udo Last was made Knight in the Order of the Netherlands Lion on 12 May 1874. He died in The Hague at age 60.

== Decoration ==
- Knight in the Order of the Netherlands Lion (1874)

== Personal life ==
Udo Last married Ida Catharina Wilhelmina Elisabeth Carlier on 13 October 1852 in Ambal, Kebumen.

A carte de visite of Udo Last can be found in the photoalbum of John F. Loudon, which is kept in the print room of Leiden University.
