= Jan Pranger =

Dutch merchant, slave trader and colonial administrator

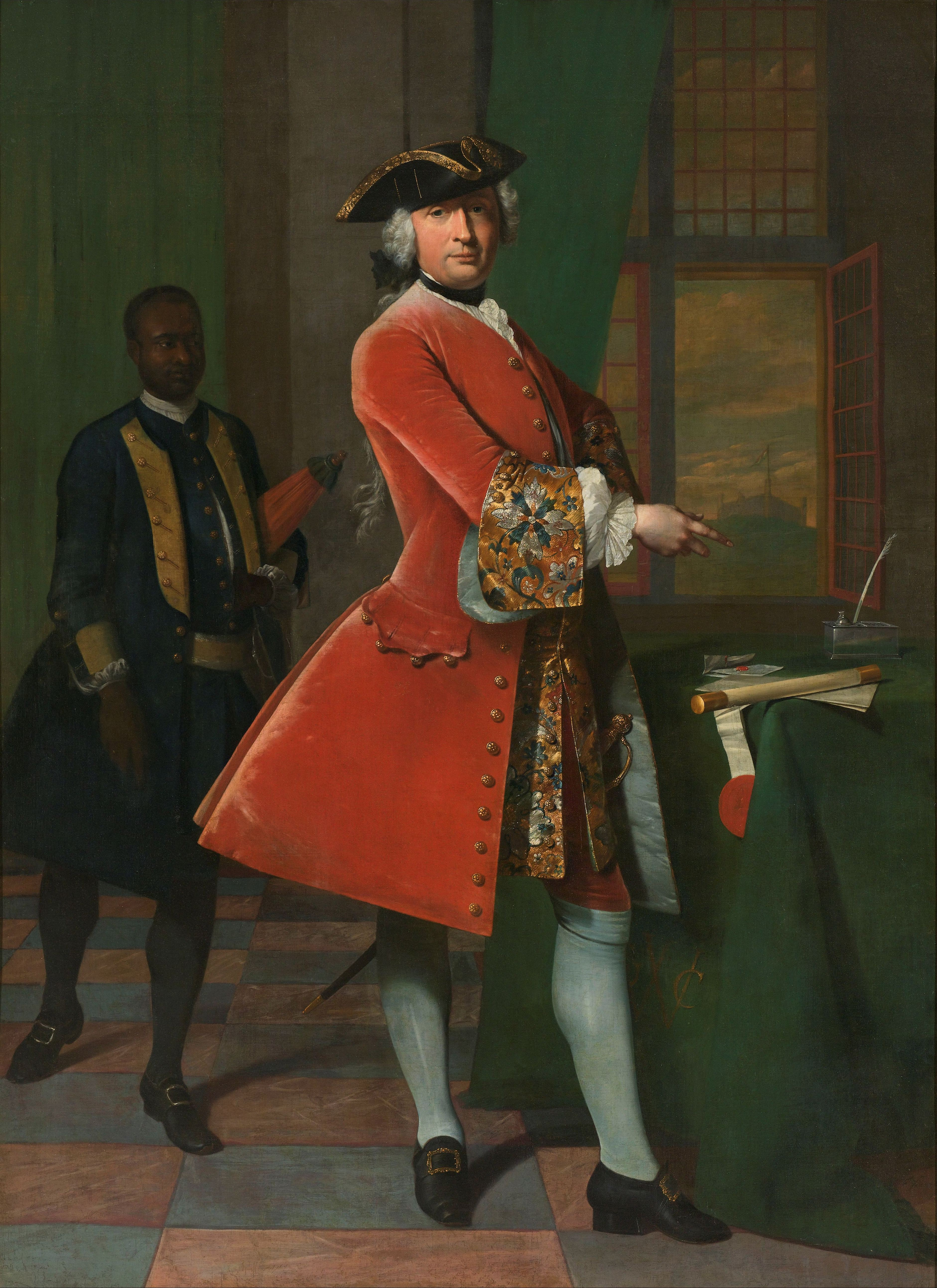
- Portrait by Frans van der Mijn, 1742

Director-General of the Dutch Gold Coast
- In office 6 March 1730 – 13 March 1734
- Preceded by: Robert Norre
- Succeeded by: Antonius van Overbeke

Personal details
- Born: c. 1700 Amsterdam, Dutch Republic
- Died: April 13, 1773 (aged 72–73) Amsterdam, Dutch Republic
- Spouse(s): Elisabeth Oloff (m. 1736); Machteld Muilman (m. 1745)

Jan Pranger (c. 1700 – 13 April 1773) was a Dutch merchant, slave trader and colonial administrator who served as the Director-General of the Dutch Gold Coast from 1730 to 1734. A portrait of him along with an enslaved servant by Dutch artist Frans van der Mijn in on display at the Rijksmuseum in Amsterdam.

== Early life ==
Jan Pranger was born c. 1700 in Amsterdam to Jan Pranger Sr., a Dutch wine merchant, and his wife Johanna van Eden. The family belonged to the middle class of the Dutch Republic. In 1720, Pranger was employed by the Dutch West India Company as an assistant to the Dutch merchants operating out of Elmina, one of the lowest administrative ranks available on the Dutch Gold Coast. He soon rose in prominence in the Gold Coast, and in 1724 was appointed the head of Fort Crèvecœur in Accra, an office which came with the rank of head merchant (Dutch: oppercommies) and an accession to the Colonial Council in Elmina.

== Director-General of the Dutch Gold Coast ==
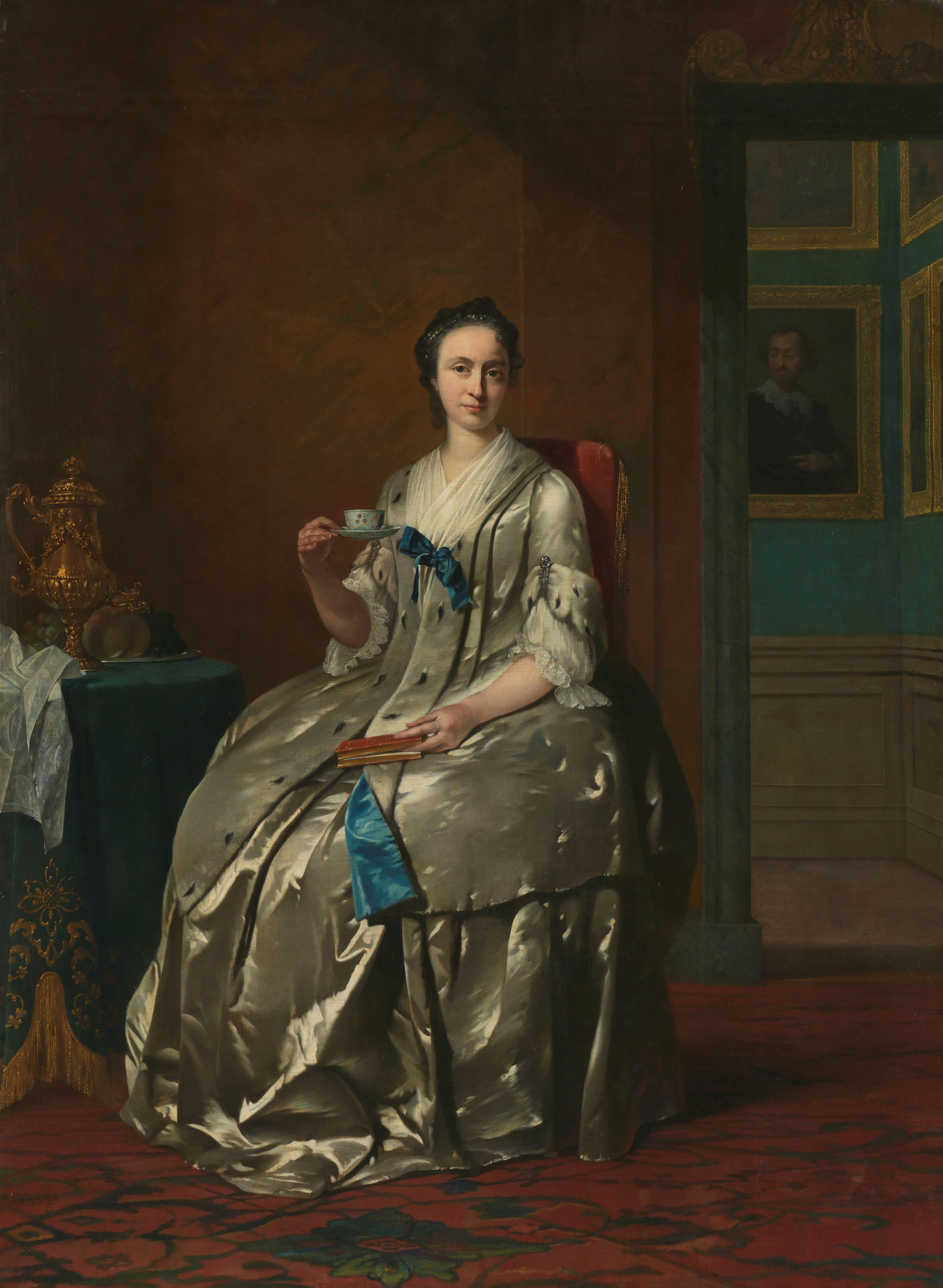
Pranger's second wife Machteld Muilman

When the Director-General of the Dutch Gold Coast, Pieter Valkenier, resigned in 1725, he advised the Colonial Council to install either Robert Norre or Pranger as his successor. Probably due to his young age, Pranger was passed over in favour of Robert Norre, but when he resigned in 1729, Pranger was eventually selected for the post of Director-General. Pranger was officially installed as Director-General on 6 March 1730.

As Director-General, Pranger soon came into conflict with head merchant Hendrik Hertogh, who operated out of the factory in Jaquim on the Dutch Slave Coast, which was in theory subordinate to the Director-General. In 1732, the factory in Jaquim was looted and burnt by forces from the Kingdom of Dahomey; in response, Pranger dispatched a diplomatic expedition under the leadership of his subordinate Jacobus Elet to Abomey in order to negotiate with King Agaja. Although initially the expedition seemed successful, in the end the relationship with Dahomey proved to be damaged beyond repair.

Out of frustration with the situation in Dahomey, Pranger petitioned the Colonial Council to accept his letter of resignation on 3 May 1733, and on 13 March 1734, his successor Antonius van Overbeke was installed by the council. In June 1735, Pranger left the Gold Coast on a slave ship headed for Surinam. As he fell ill during the voyage, he only departed Surinam in the spring of 1736. Pranger eventually arrived in the Dutch Republic on 15 June 1736.

== Later life and death ==
Almost immediately after his return to the Dutch Republic, on 5 July 1736, he married Elisabeth Oloff, who died a little more than three years later, on 5 December 1739. Pranger remarried to Machteld Muilman on 14 September 1745. Pranger had become wealthy man due to his service in the Gold Coast. During his retirement in the Dutch Republic, Pranger purchased a canal house on the Singel canal in Amsterdam, and a country house outside of the city. He employed four domestic workerss and owned three horses. Pranger died in Amsterdam on 13 April 1773.
