= Wijk aan Zee en Duin =

Coordinates: 52°30′N 4°37′E

Coat of Arms of Wijk aan Zee en Duin

Wijk aan Zee en Duin is a former municipality in the Dutch province of North Holland. It existed from 1817 to 1936, when it was merged with Beverwijk.

The municipality included the village of Wijk aan Zee and the countryside surrounding Beverwijk.
