= Cornelis Meeuwsen =

Dutch colonial administrator and tobacco farmer

Governor of the Dutch Gold Coast
- ad interim
- In office 7 May 1860 – 21 January 1861
- Monarch: William III of the Netherlands
- Preceded by: Cornelis Nagtglas
- Succeeded by: Cornelis Nagtglas

Personal details
- Born: 17 March 1826 Huissen, Netherlands
- Died: 30 April 1896 (aged 70) Huissen, Netherlands
- Spouse: Hendrina Johanna Leijser

Cornelis Meeuwsen (born 17 March 1826 – 30 April 1896) was a Dutch colonial administrator and tobacco farmer, who made a career in the administration on the Dutch Gold Coast and who became interim governor during the European leave of governor Cornelis Nagtglas between 7 May 1860 and 21 January 1861.

== Biography ==
Cornelis Meeuwsen was born in Huissen as the tenth child of Gradus Meuwsen and Gertrudis Steenhof. Both his father and grandfather cultivated tobacco, a popular crop in Huissen in the middle of the 19th century.

Meeuwsen's familiarity with cultivating tobacco was one of the main reasons to recruit him for service on the Dutch Gold Coast, as the colonial government had started a tobacco plantation in the government garden of Elmina. Meeuwsen was appointed assistant on the Coast of Guinea by royal decree of 21 juni 1848 and departed for the Dutch Gold Coast on 14 November 1848, arriving on 11 February 1849.

Meeuwsen developed a tobacco plantation at Simbo, which was more successful than the plantation established on poor soil in the government garden in Elmina. The Simbo plantation soon had difficulty attracting labourers, however, and was shut down on 30 June 1855.

Meeuwsen was promoted to resident on the Coast of Guinea on 1 December 1855 and continued his career in the colonial administration as commandant of Fort San Sebastian at Shama. On 14 May 1856, he was appointed commandant of Fort Orange at Sekondi.

After returning to the Gold Coast on 11 September 1857 from a year-long European leave, Meeuwsen was appointed bookkeeper, public prosecutor, government secretary and cashier, succeeding Petrus Jacobus Runckel. This office made Meeuwsen second in command of the colony. During the European leave of Nagtglas between 7 May 1860 and 21 January 1861, Meeuwsen served as acting governor.

Meeuwsen returned to the Netherlands on 14 April 1861 and was honourably discharged of his duties by royal decree of 27 October 1861. Almost immediately after his return, on 19 June 1861, he married Hendrina Johanna Leijser, with whom he had six children. He settled again in Huissen, where he was a member of the municipal council.

Cornelis Meeuwsen died on 30 April 1896, aged 70.
