= Jacobus van der Breggen Paauw =

Dutch colonial administrator

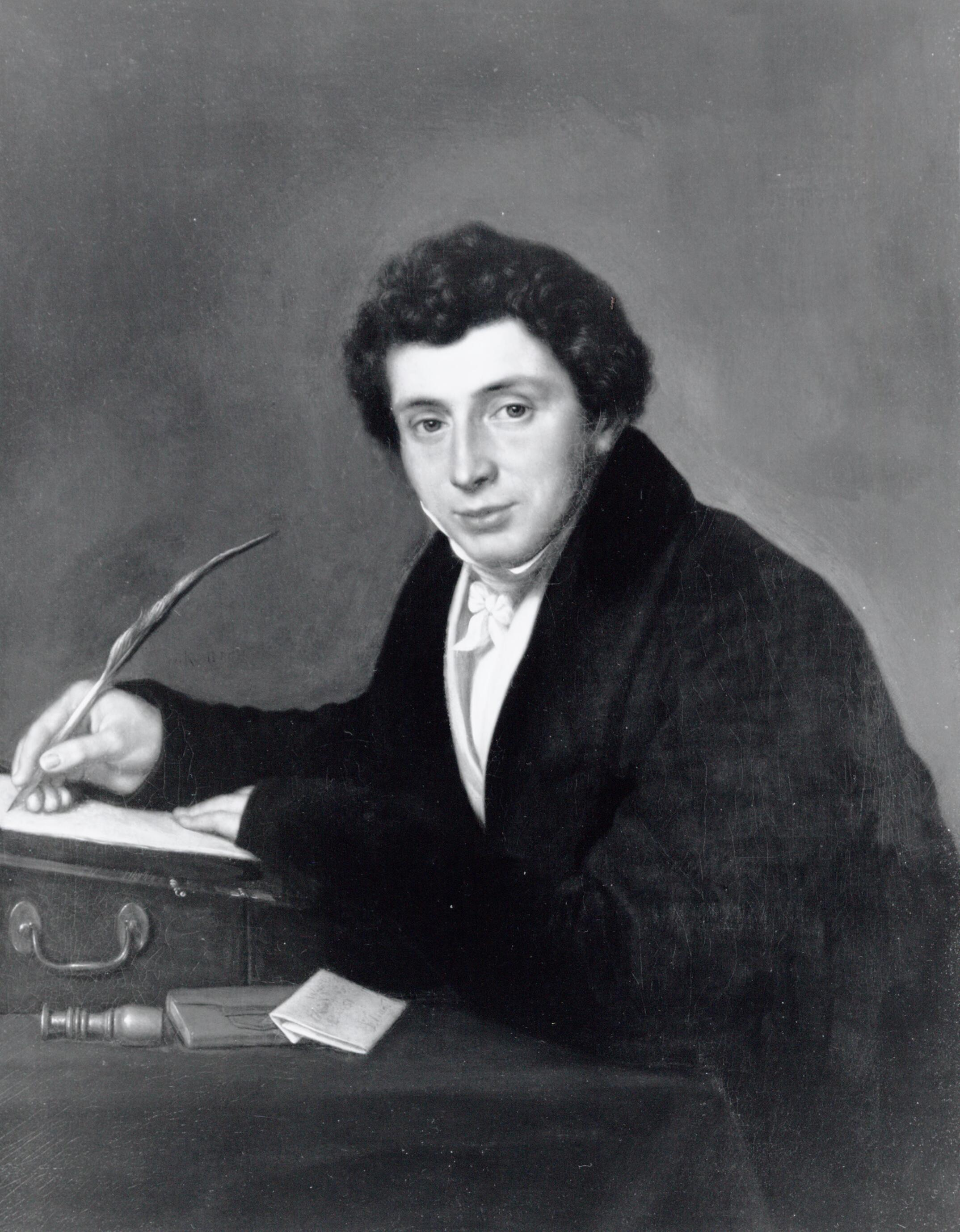

Commander of the Dutch Gold Coast
- ad interim
- In office 3 January 1826 – 26 November 1827
- Monarch: William I of the Netherlands
- Preceded by: Friedrich Last
- Succeeded by: Friedrich Last

Personal details
- Born: 14 June 1797; Amsterdam, Batavian Republic
- Died: 19 January 1830 (aged 32); Near the Isles of Scilly

Jacobus Cornelis van der Breggen Paauw (born 14 June 1797 – 19 January 1830) was a Dutch colonial administrator on the Gold Coast. He was interim commander between 1826 and 1828.

== Biography ==
Jacobus van der Breggen Paauw was born in Amsterdam to Pieter van der Breggen Paauw, a Remonstrant minister, and Jacoba Cornelia Maas.

Van der Breggen Paauw was one of the colonial administrators that accompanied the designated Governor-General Herman Willem Daendels during his journey to the Gold Coast in 1815. Daendels's appointment as Governor-General of the scattered and rather unimportant Dutch colonial holdings on the Gold Coast was a consequence of him being a leader of the Patriot faction in the Batavian Republic and Kingdom of Holland. After the House of Orange-Nassau was restored to the centre of power in the Netherlands in 1813, the newly inaugurated King William I of the Netherlands, found in the Dutch possessions Gold Coast a perfect excuse to rid himself of a potentially dangerous rival. To keep Daendels at peace, he was guaranteed an increased budget and some highly qualified colonial administrators, of which Van der Breggen Paauw was one.

Between 1815 and 1821, Van der Breggen Paauw was as an assistant in the colonial administration, serving among other things as bookkeeper, secretary, fiscal and cashier. He was honourably discharged from his duties on 1 May 1821. Van der Breggen Paauw remained on the Gold Coast, however, and settled in Accra as a private merchant. In July 1825, Van der Breggen Paauw returned to the colonial administration as a resident, however, and became acting commander of the Dutch Gold Coast during the European leave of acting commander Friedrich Last between 3 January 1826 and 26 November 1827.

Van der Breggen Paauw and his wife Martha Johanna Theodora Rühle both drowned when the ship that was to take them to the Netherlands sank near the Isles of Scilly.

== Personal life ==
When he was Acting Commander of the Dutch Gold Coast, Jacobus van der Breggen Paauw married the Euro-African Martha Johanna Theodora Rühle according to local rites on 12 June 1827 in Elmina. After Commander Friedrich Last returned to the Gold Coast in 1828, the couple requested him to confirm their marriage.
