= Willem Poolman =

Dutch military officer and colonial administrator

Commander of the Dutch Gold Coast
- In office 6 June 1822 – 14 June 1823
- Monarch: William I of the Netherlands
- Preceded by: Librecht Jan Temminck
- Succeeded by: Hendrik Adriaan Mouwe

Personal details
- Born: 8 October 1778 Amsterdam, Netherlands
- Died: 14 June 1823 (aged 44) Elmina, Dutch Gold Coast

Willem Poolman (born 8 October 1778 – 14 June 1823) was a Dutch military officer and colonial administrator on the Gold Coast.

== Biography ==
Willem Poolman was born in Amsterdam to Willem Poolman senior and Catharina Groen. He became a military officer and was eventually installed Commander of the Dutch Gold Coast on 31 December 1821. Poolman arrived in Elmina on 28 May 1822 and was installed on 6 June. Willem Poolman died in office on 14 June 1823.

== Personal life ==
Willem Poolman married Elsje Harmsen in 1803. Their son Willem Poolman junior (1809–1873) was a member of parliament and founder of the Netherlands East Indies Railway Company.
