= Kwadwo Akyampon =

Ghanaian diplomat (c. 1767–1832)

Kwadwo Akyampon (C. 1767 - 1832) was an agent of Osei Bonsu who acted as representative to both the Fante government at Elmina and the Dutch colonial officials at that location. In this position he essential acted as the Ashanti Empire governor over El Mina. In 1828 Akyampon commanded a contingent of forces in the defense of Elmina against attacks by Fante, Denkyera and Wasa forces.

It appears that he is the Akyampon who worked in 1808 to establish order in the section of Accra adjacent to the Dutch Fort following a dispute between various factions. In 1811 he narrowly escaped a rebellion against Ashanti authority in Akuapem in which over 100 Ashanti were killed. Akyampon then served as a political and financial advisor to the army led by Opoku Frefre that reestablished the authority of the Ashanti Empire in this area.
