= Bartels =

Bartels is a German and Dutch patronymic surname. The given name Bartel is a vernacular shortform of Bartholomeus. Notable people with the surname include:

- Adolf Bartels (1862–1945), German journalist and poet
- Adolph Heinrich Friedrich Bartels (1819–1878), German-born mayor of Adelaide, Australia
- Adolphe Bartels (1802–1862), Belgian liberal, journalist and writer
- Aloysius Bartels (1915–2002), Dutch politician and state secretary
- Anna Bartels (1869–1950), Swedish opera singer
- Arthur Bartels (born 1971), German mathematician
- Carel Hendrik Bartels (1792–1850), Dutch Gold Coast businessman
- Carl Bernard Bartels (1866–1955), German/British sculptor
- Cornelius Ludewich Bartels (died 1804), Governor-General of the Dutch Gold Coast
- Edward Bartels (1925–2007), American basketball player
- Fin Bartels (born 1987), German footballer
- Francis Lodowic Bartels (1910–2010), Ghanaian diplomat
- Frank Henry Bartels (1867–1895), South Australian artist
- Hans von Bartels (1856–1913), German painter
- Hans-Peter Bartels (born 1961), German politician
- Heinrich Bartels (1918–1944), German World War II flying ace
- Hermann Bartels (1900–1989), German architect
- Imke Bartels (born 1977), Dutch equestrian
- Jayden Bartels (born 2004), American dancer, actress, model, YouTuber and social media personality
- Joanie Bartels (born 1953), American children's musician
- Johann Christian Martin Bartels (1769–1836), German mathematician
- John R. Bartels (1897–1997), American judge
- Julius Bartels (1899–1964), German geophysicist and statistician
  - Named after him: Bartels (crater), a lunar crater, and Bartels' Rotation Number
- Julius (John) Murray Bartels (1872–1944), philatelist of New York City
- Kerry Anne Bartels (born 1956), Australian politician
- Knud Bartels (born 1952), Danish general
- Kwamena Bartels (born 1947), Ghanaian politician
- Larry Bartels (born 1956), American political scientist
- Max Bartels (1871–1936), Dutch plantation owner and naturalist
  - Named after him: Bartel's flying squirrel, Bartels's rat, Bartels's spiny rat, Bartels's wood-owl and Max's shrew
- Meike Bartels (born 1973), Dutch psychologist
- Mel Bartels (born 1954), American amateur astronomer
  - Named after him: 17823 Bartels, a main belt asteroid
- Michael Bartels (born 1968), German professional racing driver
- Peggielene Bartels (born 1953), Ghanaian chief, wife of a descendant of Carel Hendrik Bartels
- Peter Bartels (born 1941), Australian businessman
- Ralf Bartels (born 1978), German shot-putter
- Tim Bartels (born 1988), German rower
- Tineke Bartels (born 1951), Dutch equestrian
- Wolfgang Bartels (skier) (1940–2007), German alpine skier
- Wolfgang Bartels (politician, born 1903) (1903–1975), German politician

== Ghanaian family ==
The Bartels family was an important Euro-African family on the Gold Coast, founded by Cornelius Ludewich Bartels (died 1804), Governor-General of the Dutch Gold Coast between 1798 and 1804, and his son Carel Hendrik Bartels (1792–1850). Descendants of this family include Charles Francis Hutchison (1879–ca. 1940) Francis Lodowic Bartels (1910–2010), a Ghanaian educator and diplomat, Kwamena Bartels (born 1947), a former Ghanaian Interior Minister, and Peggielene Bartels (born 1953), a Ghanaian chief, who is married to a descendant.

== See also ==
- Bartel (disambiguation)
- Bartles & Jaymes, an alcoholic beverage
