= Huydecoper =

Huydecoper may refer to:

- Joan Huydecoper van Maarsseveen (1599–1661), Dutch golden age merchant
- Joan Huydecoper II (1625-1704), Dutch merchant, son of the above
- Jacob Huydecoper (1811-1845), Dutch civil servant
- Willem Huydecoper (1788-1826), Dutch merchant
- Jan Pieter Theodoor Huydecoper (1728-1767), Dutch administrator
