= Bartels (Ghanaian family) =

Euro-African dynasty

The Bartels family are an important Euro-African clan. They originated on the Gold Coast, founded by Cornelius Ludewich Bartels (died 1804), Governor-General of the Dutch Gold Coast between 1798 and 1804, and his son Carel Hendrik Bartels (1792–1850). They have remained prominent in the contemporary Republic of Ghana.

== Notable descendants ==
Descendants of this family include:

- Charles Francis Hutchison (1879–ca. 1940), a Ghanaian socialite and author.
- Francis Lodowic Bartels (1910–2010), a Ghanaian educator and diplomat.
- Kwamena Bartels (born 1947), a Ghanaian Interior Minister.
- Peggielene Bartels (born 1953), a Ghanaian chief, who is married to a descendant of the family.

== See also ==
- Casely-Hayford
- Ofori-Atta
