= Peggielene Bartels =

Ghanaian chief

Amuah Afenyi VI
- Hon. Nana of Tantum
- Investiture: 25 September 2008
- Predecessor: Amuah Afenyi V
- Born: 1953 (age 72–73); Cape Coast, Gold Coast (now Ghana)
Names
- Peggielene Bartels
- Religion: Christian

Nana Amuah-Afenyi VI (born Peggielene Bartels in 1953), known informally as King Peggy, is the reigning chief of the town of Tantum (or Otuam), in the Mfantsiman Municipal District, Ghana. Born in the Gold Coast (now Ghana) and a naturalized citizen of the United States since 1997, she moved to the United States in the 1970s when she was in her early twenties to work as a secretary at the Embassy of Ghana in Washington, D.C., where she still works. Following the death of her uncle in 2008, she was selected as his successor through a series of traditional rituals. She is a devout Christian, and she lives in Silver Spring, Maryland.

== Life ==
Bartels' husband, William Bartels, was a member of the Euro-African Bartels family, whose ancestor Cornelius Ludewich Bartels was Governor-General of the Dutch Gold Coast between 1798 and 1804, and whose son Carel Hendrik Bartels was the most prominent biracial slave trader on the Gold Coast in the second quarter of the nineteenth century.

"King" is the traditional title for the ruler of Otuam. Bartels is the first female to occupy this position, and prefers the title of "King" to "Queen": "Most of the time, a king is the one who has all the executive power to do things, while the queen is mostly in charge of the children's affairs and reporting to the king. So I really love this." The residents of Otuam also address Bartels as "Nana," an honorary title for royalty and senior women with grandchildren.

As part of her royal duties, Bartels wakes every morning at 1:00 a.m. EST, to call Otuam (which is several hours ahead) to keep up with her regent and elders. Since her accession, Bartels has also spent several weeks each year in Ghana around the anniversary of her coronation.

So far, Bartels has helped poor families pay school fees for their children, brought computers to classrooms, and helped provide Otuam with its first ambulance, as well as access to clean, running water. Since her retirement from the Ghanaian embassy, Bartels has opened a travel agency providing informed tours of Ghana and to support her many social projects.

== Dominion ==
Among Bartels' territorial possessions as chief are a 1,000-acre (4.0 km^{2}) family-owned estate and an eight-bedroom palace.

Tantum is a coastal fishing village in Mfantsiman Municipal District. It is located at 5°13.3′N 0°48.5′W. (It may be part of the Ekumfi District, which was formed from part of the Mfantseman District in 2012.)

== Book ==
She and writer Eleanor Herman have co-written King Peggy (ISBN 978-0-385-53432-1), published in 2012 by Doubleday.
