= Fort Winneba =

Fort in Ghana

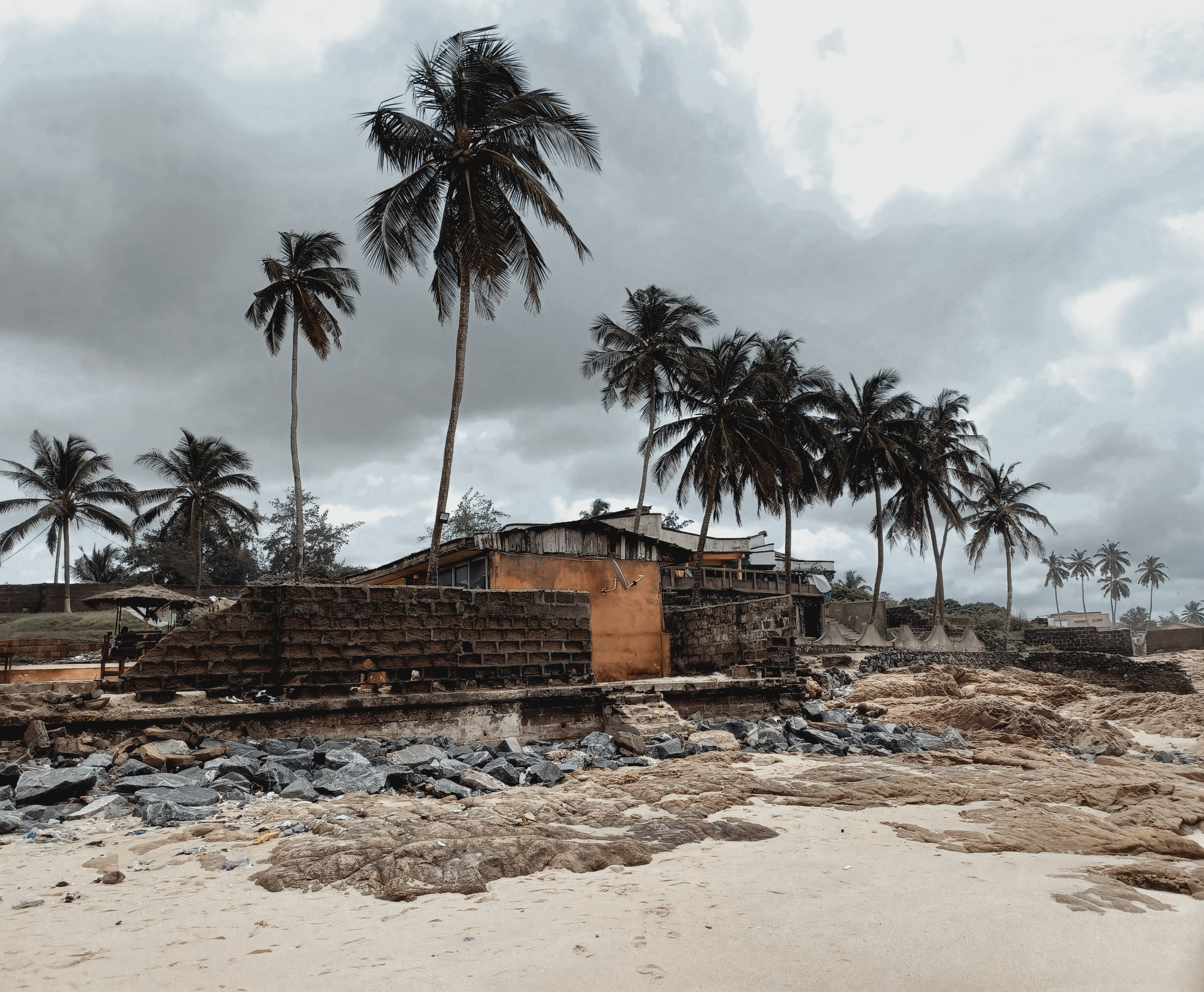
Fort Winneba in 2022

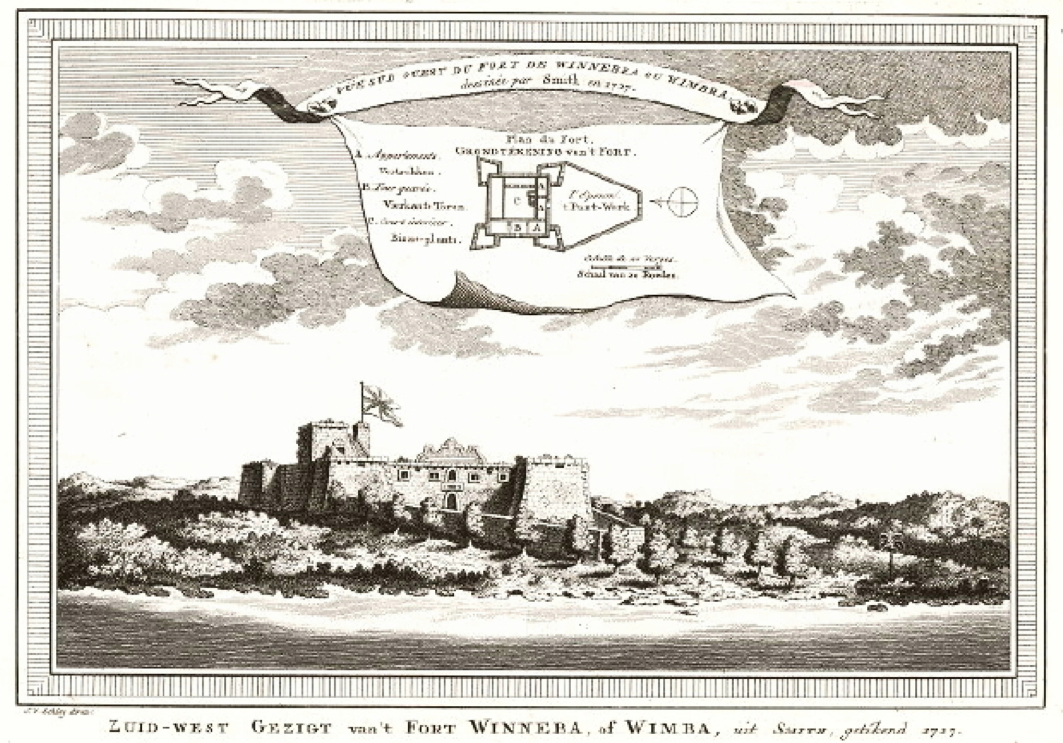
Engraving by Jacobus van der Schley of view from the South West, 1727, from sketch by William Smith

Fort Winneba was a slave fort designed to facilitate the trade in enslaved people. The Royal African Company built the fort in 1694, on the Gold Coast, in modern-day Ghana.

William Smith, who had been appointed to review the Company's castles in Africa following disturbing reports that they were unprofitable, in 1727 surveyed the fort. He described it as follows:

the next Day [we] anchor'd at Winneba in Five Fathom Water. Here we were supplied with pure fresh Water from out of their Tank, and tho' we had drawn several Tons of it, I could not perceive we had lowerd it Six Inches, from whence I concluded the Tank at Winneba has a Spring in it, the bottom being all a Rock . This Fort is exactly the same Plan and Dimensions as Tantumquery, nor is the Landing-Place any better. The Fort stands on a rising Ground about Fourteen Yards from the Seaside, having a handsome Avenue of Trees up to the Outer Gate. Here is also a large Spurr, which contributes very much to the Strength and Usefulness of the Fort, being a safe Place to secure their Cattle at Night from the Wild Beasts. Here also are very good Gardens; all which together render the Place pleasant and Comfortable enough"

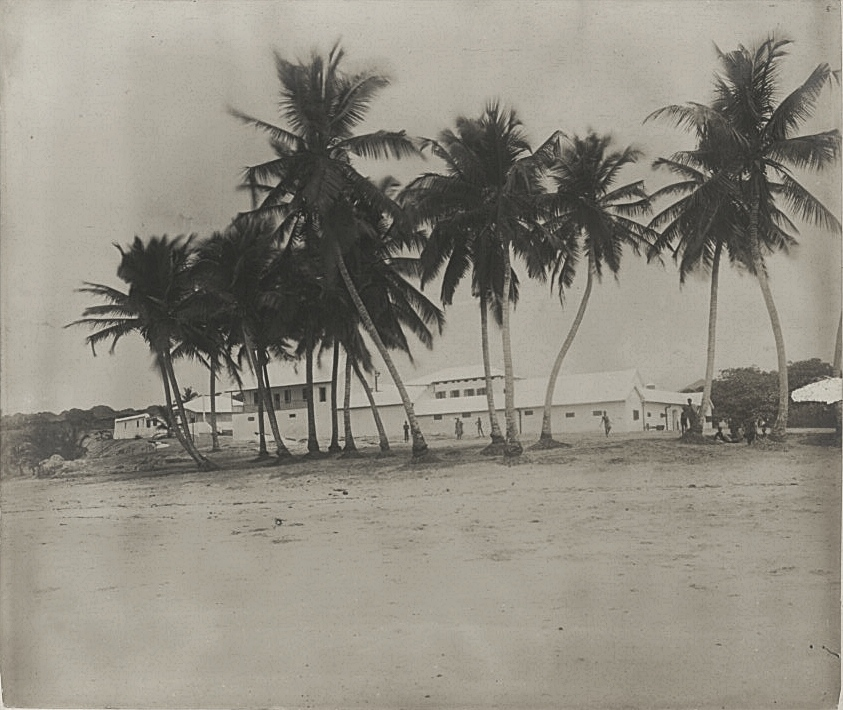
Fort Winneba in the 1890s
