= Gold Coast Euro-Africans =

Historical ethnic group in Ghana

Total population
- ~0.5% – 2% of the Gold Coast population

Regions with significant populations
- Accra; Anomabu; Cape Coast; Elmina; Keta; Saltpond; Sekondi-Takoradi; Winneba

Languages
- English; Ewe; Fante; Ga

Religion
- Protestantism; Catholicism

Related ethnic groups
- African American; Afro-Brazilians; Afro-Caribbeans; Gambian Creole people; Amaro people; Americo Liberian; Atlantic Creole; Black Britons; Black Nova Scotians; Fernandinos; Saro people; Sierra Leone Creole; Signare; Tabom people

Gold Coast Euro-Africans were a historical demographic based in coastal urban settlements in colonial Ghana, that largely arose from unions between European men and African women from the late 15th century – the decade between 1471 and 1482, until the mid-20th century, circa 1957, when Ghana attained its independence from the United Kingdom. In this period, different geographic areas of the Gold Coast were politically controlled at various times by the Portuguese, Germans, Swedes, Danes, Dutch and the British. There are also records of merchants of other European nationalities such as the Spaniards, French, Italians and Irish, operating along the coast, in addition to American sailors and traders from New York, Massachusetts and Rhode Island.

Euro-Africans were influential in intellectual, technocratic, artisanal, commercial and public life in general, actively participating in multiple fields of scholarly and civic importance. Scholars have referred to this Euro-African population of the Gold Coast as "mulattos", "mulatofoi" and "owulai" among other descriptions. The term, owula conveys contemporary notions of "gentlemanliness, learning and urbanity" or "a salaried big man" in the Ga language. The cross-cultural interactions between Europeans and Africans were mercantile-driven and an avenue to boost social capital for economic and political gain i.e. "wealth and power". The growth and development of Christianity during the colonial period also instituted motifs of modernity vis-à-vis Euro-African identity. This model created a spectrum of practices, ranging from a full celebration of native African customs to a total embrace and acculturation of European culture.

== Genealogy ==
Gold Coast Euro-Africans were mostly members of Anlo Ewe, Fante and Ga ethnicities - groups that are historically based along the coast of Ghana. Typical cities that had a strong Euro-African presence include Accra, Anomabu, Cape Coast, Elmina, Keta, Saltpond, Sekondi-Takoradi and Winneba. Many Euro-Africans also owned farms and hamlets further inland on peri-urban plains and rural locales. Euro-African residences along the coast, which also housed well-stocked personal libraries, typically combined colonial architecture designs from Palladian plans, traditional Akan courtyard houses, and the sobrado styles. Euro-African marriage ceremonies largely combined traditional customary practices with nominal Western Christian standards of monogamy, often in accordance with official colonial rules of the time. Euro-Africans also forged relationships with prominent native families of royal ancestry and nobility, both along the coast and in the Akan hinterland. As a result, Euro-Africans were "intermediaries" and "councillors" who straddled both spheres with relative ease. There are also cases of intermarriages between Euro-Africans and immigrants from the African diaspora in the Atlantic such as Afro-Brazilians, West Indians and those Sierra Leone Creoles descended from the Nova Scotian Settlers. A number of these Euro-Afro-Caribbean families are still extant. There are also records of marriages between Euro-Africans and groups from Anglophone West Africa territories. In postcolonial Ghana, Euro-Africans fully assimilated into the broader Ghanaian culture and are therefore no longer perceived by scholars as a distinct demographic group.

== Cultural attributes ==
=== Education and literacy ===
Euro-Africans were noted for their literacy, having benefited from a European-type formal education at the castle schools at Christiansborg and Cape Coast, both opened in the seventeenth century, as well as the government school at Elmina Castle which was opened in 1482. This Western style education can be situated in coastal commerce and educational connections to Protestant missionaries from the Basel and Wesleyan societies that operated in the colony's townships. The castle schools were started with the approval of European Governors to baptise and primarily educate the male Euro-African mulatto children of European men and Gold Coast African women to train them as administrative clerks and interpreters for colonial civil servants as well as soldiers in the garrisons around coastal European fortresses.

Early generations of Euro-Africans went to Europe for higher education. Though largely excluded from the higher ranks of state bureaucracy, Western-educated Euro-Africans formed the nucleus of the emerging literate, wealthy, urban, anglophile professionals, co-opting the imperial project aspirations on the Gold Coast. The sartorial choice for Euro-African men and women included frock-coats, top hats and Victorian dresses, creating caricature images of a pseudo-aristocracy. Examples within this group include James Bannerman (1790–1858), John Hansen (d. 1840) of Jamestown and trader and politician, Henry Richter (1785–1849) of Osu. James Bannerman (1790–1858) was the Lieutenant-Governor of the Gold Coast from 4 December 1850 to 14 October 1851. James Bannerman's father was Scottish while his mother was a Fante woman. He married an Asante princess, Yaa Hom or Yeboah, daughter of the then Asantehene, Osei Bonsu, a political prisoner captured during the Battle of Katamanso in 1826. Moreover, on the Dutch Gold Coast, Carel Hendrik Bartels (1792 – 1850), the son of Cornelius Ludewich Bartels (d. 1804), Governor-General of the Gold Coast, and a local Fante mulatto woman, Maria Clericq was sent to the Netherlands during his youth for education. Additionally, George Lutterodt, an educated Ga-Danish mulatto merchant and an ally of the Basel missionary, Andreas Riis served as the acting Governor of the Danish Gold Coast from 5 July 1844 to 9 October 1844.

In another instance, a clash between the old customs and the new Euro-African paradigm of literacy happened in the 1840s, when a Danish-educated baptised Ga native, Frederick Noi Dowuona initially declined the Osu Maŋtsɛ chieftain position, citing his Christian beliefs imbibed from his education in Denmark, work as an interpreter and educator at the Christiansborg Castle and his encounter with the first Basel missionaries who arrived on the Gold Coast in 1828. In 1854 after the naval bombardment of Osu over the poll tax ordinance, Dowuona grudgingly accepted to be enstooled on condition of being allowed by the traditional polity to wear Western attire and be exempt from certain religious observances and rituals, in discharging his duties as the king of the town.

=== Participation in public discourse ===
The then emerging clergy and catechist class had educated "mulattos" among its ranks. A notable Western-educated Euro-African churchman was the Basel Mission pastor and historian, Carl Christian Reindorf whose magnum opus, The History of the Gold Coast and Asante, was published in 1895. Reindorf married Juliana Ayikai Mansah Djebi, a member of a notable Asere chieftaincy family. His father had been a Danish-Ga soldier stationed at the Christiansborg Castle barracks, and later became an agent for an English merchant, Joshua Ridley. Carl Reindorf's grandfather, Augustus Frederick Hackenburg was a Danish merchant who arrived on the Gold Coast in 1739 and later became the colonial Governor, leaving the position in 1748. As an illustration, in mass media, the first indigenous newspaper to be established on the Gold Coast was the Accra Herald, later renamed the West African Herald, first published in 1857 in British Accra by the Euro-African English-trained lawyer Charles Bannerman and his brother Edmund, scions of the then well-connected coastal Bannerman family. The two brothers were children of James Bannerman. The newspaper was critical of European proselytizing on the Gold Coast and by 1859 had a readership of 310 subscribers. Literature thus became an effective vehicle for public opinion and discourse.

== Social perceptions ==
Oral accounts indicate that coastal mulatto men had a perceived reputation of marital instability and philandering even though the native religions permitted polygamy. A Basel missionary observed that Euro-African men were often "half-bankrupt...lazy and lustful" in their quest for entertainment or merry-making. Euro-African traders often partook in traditional festivals like Homowo of the Ga people of Accra which had elements of drumming, dancing and brandy drinking. Many Euro-Africans, though baptised and confirmed in the church, were nominally Christian and led a "robustly secular lifestyle" which was at odds with the lifestyle of Pietistic Basel and Victorian Wesleyan missionaries whose spiritual influence extended to the coast. Like their trader counterparts, Euro-Africans in white-collar occupations often socialised with European residents on the coast, engaging in "hard drinking, gambling and occasional outburst of violent behaviour."

== Notable Gold Coast Euro-Africans ==
- James Bannerman - Lieutenant-Governor of the Gold Coast from 4 December 1850 to 14 October 1851
- Carel Hendrik Bartels - judge, colonial government official in Elmina and trader on the Dutch Gold Coast
- George Emil Eminsang - Gold Coast lawyer
- Frederik Willem Fennekol - Dutch jurist and politician
- Regina Hesse - pioneer woman educator and school principal on the Gold Coast
- Henry van Hien - Gold Coast nationalist leader
- Jacob Huydecoper - Gold Coast diplomat
- Frans Last - Attorney General at the Supreme Court of the Dutch East Indies, son of commander Friedrich Last and Euro-African Elisabeth Atteveldt
- Willem Essuman Pietersen - Gold Coast merchant and educationalist
- Christian Jacob Protten - Moravian missionary, linguist, translator and educator in Christiansborg on the Danish Gold Coast in the 1700s
- Emmanuel Charles Quist - barrister, judge and the first African President of the Legislative Council and first Speaker of the Parliament of Ghana
- Carl Christian Reindorf - Basel mission pastor and pioneer historian
- Hendrik Vroom - merchant and administrator

=== Euro-African unions ===
- James Bannerman (1790–1858), British officer in British Gold Coast, son of a Fante mother and a British father from Scotland. Married to an Ashanti princess.
- Carel Hendrik Bartels (1792–1850) was the son of Cornelius Ludewich Bartels, Governor-General of the Dutch Gold Coast and local mulatto Maria Clericq.
- Cornelius Ludewich Bartels (?–1804), German officer of the Dutch West India Company. Had sons with a Gold Coast woman and with half-Dutch, half-African Maria Clericq. His descent has had a relevant role in Ghana.
- Willem Bosman (1672–after 1703), Dutch merchant. The Ghanaian surname Bossman is thought to originate from the children Bosman had with his native African mistresses.
- Jan Niezer (1756–1822), merchant in the Dutch Gold Coast. Son of a German doctor's assistant and an African woman.
- Christian Jacob Protten (1715–1769), missionary in the Danish Gold Coast. Son of a Danish soldier and a Ga princess.
- Willem George Frederik Derx (1813–1890), Dutch civil servant. Married Jacoba Araba Bartels.
- Willem Jan Derx (1844–1913), Dutch vice-admiral. Son of Willem George Frederik Derx and Jacoba Araba Bartels.
- Willem Huydecoper (1788–1826), a merchant in the Dutch Gold Coast, son of Director-General Jan Pieter Theodoor Huydecoper, and Amba Quacoea, a Fante woman.
- Anthony van der Eb (1813–1852), Dutch civil servant. Married Efua Henrietta Huydecoper and later Manza Henrietta Bartels.

=== Selected descendants of Euro-Africans ===
- Frederick Nanka-Bruce, Gold Coast medical doctor
- Frederick Bruce-Lyle, Ghanaian judge
- William Bruce-Lyle, Ghanaian judge
- John Asamoah Bruce, Ghanaian Air Force personnel
- King Bruce, Ghanaian musician
- Vida Bruce, Ghanaian sprinter
- Harriet Bruce-Annan, Ghanaian programmer and humanitarian
- Thomas Hutton-Mills Jr., Gold Coast lawyer
- Edmund Bannerman, Gold Coast lawyer and journalist
- Charles Odamtten Easmon, first Ghanaian surgeon
- Smyly Chinery, Ghanaian civil servant
- Herman Chinery-Hesse, Ghanaian computer engineer and businessman
- Hugh Quarshie, Ghanaian British actor

=== Historically prominent Euro-African-descended families ===
Family	Primary and secondary ancestral origins	Hometown
Baëta	Anlo Ewe, Afro-Brazilian, Portuguese, Dutch	Keta
Bannerman	Ga, Fante, Asante, Scottish	Accra
Bartels	Fante, German, Dutch	Cape Coast
Brew	Fante, Irish	Anomabu
Bruce	Ga, English	Accra
Casely-Hayford	Fante, English, Irish	Cape Coast
Clerk	Ga, Jamaican, Danish, German	Accra
Easmon	Sierra Leone Creole family of Nova Scotian Settler descent or African American descent with some branches of the family being of Jamaican Maroon, Northern Irish, French, English, Danish, Welsh, and/or Ga descent.	Freetown
Hesse	Ga, Danish, German	Accra
Hutton-Mills	Ga, English, Scottish	Accra
Vanderpuije	Ga, Dutch	Accra

== Gallery ==
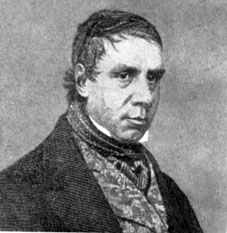
Carel Hendrik Bartels

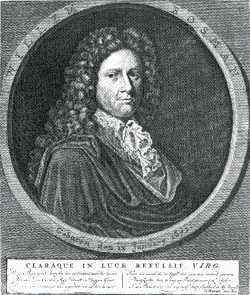
Willem Bosman

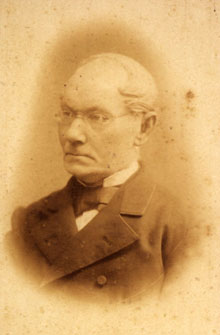
W. G .F. Derx

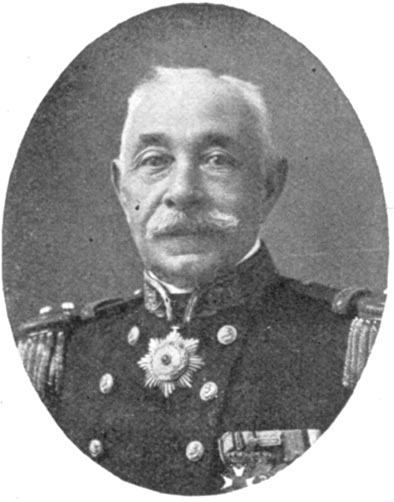
W. J. Derx

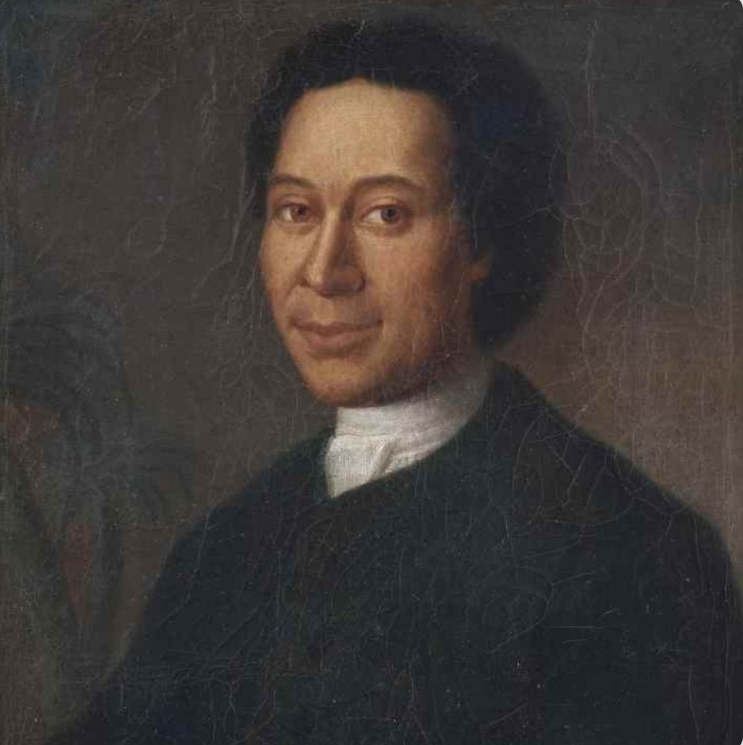
Christian Jacob Protten

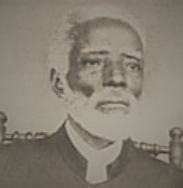
Carl Christian Reindorf

== See also ==
- Gold Coast
- Signare
- Atlantic Creole
- Americo-Liberians
- Sierra Leone Creole people
