= Christian Jacob Protten =

Gold Coast Moravian missionary and educator

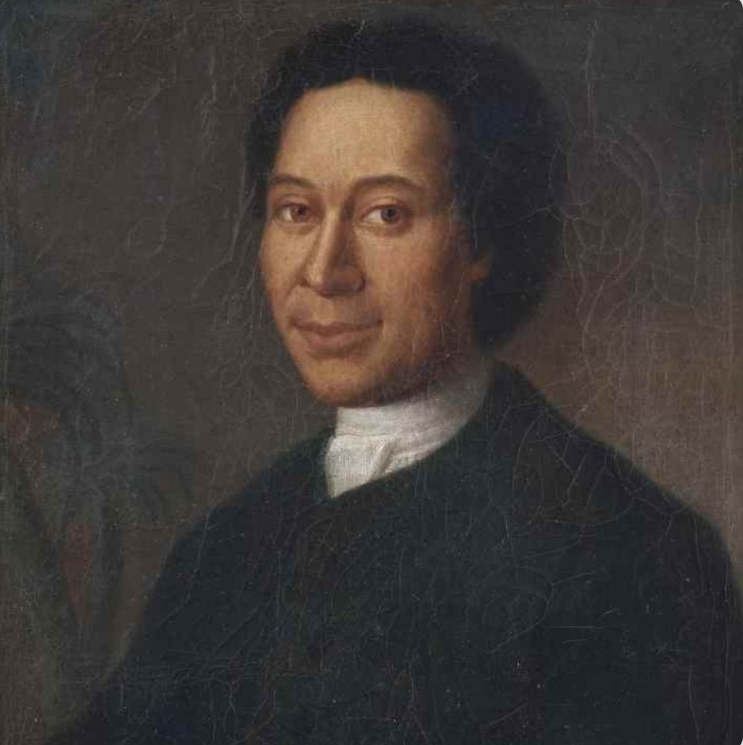
- Born: 15 September 1715; Christiansborg, Gold Coast
- Died: 24 August or 23 October 1769 (aged 53–54); Christiansborg, Gold Coast
- Education: Christiansborg Castle School; University of Copenhagen
- Occupations: Educator; Missionary; Ethnolinguist; Translator
- Known for: First grammatical treatise written in the Ga and Fante languages
- Spouse: Rebecca Protten (m. 1746)
- Children: Anna Maria Protten
- Parents: Jacob Protten (father); Aafio Dedei (mother)
- Relatives: Nii Ofori Ashangmo, Gã Maŋtsɛ, 1660–80 (grandfather)

Christian Jacob Protten also Christian Jakobus Africanus Protten or Uldrich (15 September 1715 – 24 August or 23 October 1769) was a Euro-African Moravian missionary pioneer, linguist, translator and educationalist-administrator in Christiansborg on the Danish Gold Coast in the eighteenth century. The first recorded grammatical treatise in the Ga and Fante languages was written by Protten and published in Copenhagen in 1764.

== Early life ==
=== Ancestry and family ===
Christian Jacob Protten was born on 15 September 1715 in Christiansborg, Gold Coast, now known as the suburb of Osu, Accra in Ghana. His Danish father, Jacob Protten, alias "Prot", "Prodt", "Prott", was a soldier stationed with the garrison at the Christiansborg Castle in Osu. His Ga mother of Togolese ancestry, was a princess and the daughter of a chief or king, Nii Ofori Ashangmo, the ruler of the Ga state from 1660 to 1680. Historical records list his mother as Aafio Dedei of Osu Anahor. Protten had two older siblings: a brother, Wilhelm or Friderich Protten (born 28 April 1709) and a sister, Anna Protten (born 2 February 1713), both raised in Christiansborg. Archival records indicate that Christian Protten's maternal uncle, Ashangmo, also Foli Bebe or Ofori Bembeneen was a coastal chieftain in the former Portuguese slave market of Little Popo (Aného) in modern-day Togo, and ruled the Guin/Ge State there from 1694 to 1727 or 1731–33. After the passing of Ashangmo, his son, Assiongbon Dandjin became the new ruler at Aneho sometime between 1731–33 and 1737. Christian Protten appears to have been a candidate for succession but only matrilineally.

=== Education ===
Christian Protten's early education was at the Danish language-Christiansborg Castle School for mulattoes, where he was tutored by a Lutheran minister, Elias Svane. Within the confines of the fort, Protten was introduced to Christianity and mastered the Danish language. In 1726, at the age of 11, he was chosen by his teachers and sent to Copenhagen, Denmark, together with another Euro-African pupil, Friederich Pedersen. Protten recalled that the decision to send him to a school in Denmark was against his will. His mother's family was also against this development. On the day of his departure, as he was rowed out to the waiting ship, his relatives stood on the beach, hoping the canoe would capsize and Protten would return to safety on the shore. At the age of 12, King Frederick IV of Denmark (reigned 1699–1730) took interest in his welfare and became his godfather at his baptism on 27 November 1727. After his baptism, he assumed the name Christian Jacob Protten. Protten then enrolled in a trade apprenticeship to become a blacksmith. Initially, he was disheartened to partake in the vocational training as he desired a more academic education. In 1732, he finally matriculated at the University of Copenhagen where he studied theology until 1735.

== Work ==
=== Teaching and Christian mission ===
In 1735, Christian Protten met Nikolaus Ludwig, Reichsgraf von Zinzendorf und Pottendorf (1700–60), the Bishop of the Moravian Church, at the Danish court. Shortly thereafter, he became acquainted with the Moravian fellowship and moved to Herrnhut, the Moravian colony at Berthelsdorf, which later became Saxony, staying there for the next twelve months and learning German along the way. Also in 1735, Frederick Pedersen Svane, a Ga- Danish Euro-African from Christiansborg (Osu) graduated in the arts and philosophy from the University of Copenhagen, befriended a Moravian, Carl Adolph von Plessen. Together with his Danish bride, Svane sailed to the Gold Coast as an independent missionary.

Protten was deeply unhappy in Germany, noting in his diary that Europeans described him as “afrikanisch wild” (African savage) and “mohrisch” (Moorish). In 1737, Christian Protten, along with Moravia native, Henry Huckoff, sailed from Amsterdam, the Netherlands to the Gold Coast to begin a new life as Moravian missionaries. Commenting on Protten's perceived conceitedness, Zinzendorf wrote, "Protten has a high opinion of himself. Presumptiveness and a high opinion of oneself only prostitute a person and carry no weight with the Saviour.” He was alleged to have been prone to fits of uncontrollable anger. Prior his departure to the Gold Coast, Count Zinzendorf instructed, "Dear Christian: In order to convert the Moors, you must leave all your Moorish bad habits in Amsterdam". Despite these negative remarks before his departure, Protten was nonetheless tasked with establishing a school for Euro-African children in Elmina. The ship docked at Elmina on 11 May 1737. Henry Huckuff died, presumably from fever, a month after their arrival. This new situation resulted in a change in plans for Protten who ended up visiting his mother in Little Popo/Aného, Togo. According to the Gold Coast historian and Basel Mission pastor, Carl Christian Reindorf, Protten visited his relatives at Aného in September 1737. He was reportedly kept there against his will and only returned to Osu in 1739.

His plans to start a school at Elmina were thwarted by the Dutch Governor at the time, Martinus François de Bordes who viewed Protten as a Danish spy and detained him for three years until 1740. de Bordes died in office on 16 March 1740. The political situation at the time was unfavourable as the Dutch had waged a war against the Dahomey. During Protten's imprisonment in Elmina, he was infected with malaria. Upon his release, he served as an educator for a year. In 1741, upon the receipt of a letter of invitation from von Zinzendorf, Christian Protten returned to Herrnhut, after failing to win converts on the Gold Coast. In 1743, he sailed to the island of Saint Thomas in the West Indies as an independent missionary. While in the Caribbean, he remained detached from other missionaries there. He returned to Germany in 1745 with the aim of going back to the Gold Coast. However, the Moravian leaders were not in favour of that proposal, although homesick Protten was desperate to return to his homeland. He therefore remained in the Moravian communities for the next decade.

There were constant tensions between Zinzendorf and Protten due to the latter's alcoholism and alleged haughtiness. In 1756, Protten and his wife, Rebecca were banished from the Moravian commune in Herrnhut to the village of Großhennersdorf in the Görlitz district. He received permission to return to West Africa, leaving his wife, who rejoined the religious community at Herrnhut.

In 1757, he received his commission from the Royal Chartered Danish West India and Guinea Company to become a teacher and a preacher at his alma mater, the Christiansborg Castle School. As the vessel approached the West African coast, it landed on the Grain Coast (now Liberia) where he stayed for almost four months. He arrived in Christiansborg in June 1757 and reconnected with his family. He returned to Europe in July 1761, arriving in Herrnhut in 1762; he reunited with his wife and the other Moravians. This particular journey occurred after the death of a Euro-African pupil, who Protten had accidentally shot while cleaning his rifle at the castle. Christian Protten was briefly imprisoned for this incident. In 1765, he returned to the Gold Coast with his wife, Rebecca. With the blessing of the Moravian church, he became the schoolmaster of the castle school until his death in 1769. Earlier in 1764, he had submitted a proposal to the Danish Crown, King Frederick V of Denmark (reigned 1746–66), to establish a boarding school at Christiansborg which would include a curriculum in indigenous languages, highlighting the importance he attached to literacy in his mother tongue.

Historians have concluded that his mission education initiatives on the Gold Coast were essentially failed projects. His last years in Christiansborg seem to have been troubled. In the final decades of the 18th century, several other Moravian missionaries who were sent from Europe did not survive beyond the first few months due to tropical afflictions, particularly malaria and yellow fever.

=== Foray into linguistics ===
In 1764, Christian Jacob Protten wrote his magnum opus, "En nyttig Grammaticalsk Indledelse til Tvende hidintil gandske ubekiendte Sprog, Fanteisk og Acraisk," an introductory treatise to the grammar of the Ga and Fante languages which was published in Copenhagen. Seen as his greatest achievement, the text acted as a trilingual (Danish, Fante, Ga) catechesis manual for European missionaries who yearned to learn the two Ghanaian native languages. Furthermore, Protten translated Martin Luther's Smaller Catechism into the Fante and Ga languages.

== Selected writings ==
- Protten, Christian Jacob (1764), "En nyttig Grammaticalsk Indledelse til Tvende hidintil gandske ubekiendte Sprog, Fanteisk og Acraisk," Copenhagen [A Useful Grammatical Introduction to the Ga and Fante languages]

== Personal life ==
On 6 June 1746, he married Rebecca Freundlich (1718–1780) in Herrnhut, Germany. Freundlich was also known as "Shelly", a mulatress and a former slave from the Caribbean who was the widow of a Moravian missionary, Matthäus Freundlich (c. 1681-c. 1742). Rebecca Freundlich was born on the island of Antigua in Antigua and Barbuda. Rebecca Freundlich had an arranged marriage to Matthaus Freundlich. They were married on 4 May 1738. The Freundlichs were persecuted and imprisoned for their Christian faith while they were sharing the Gospel to slaves in Saint Thomas. Rebecca Freundlich had a daughter, Anna Maria Freundlich, from her first marriage, who was born circa 1740, on the island of Saint Thomas, now the US Virgin Islands. Anna Freundlich died in 1744, aged 4 years, in Germany. The Freundlich family had travelled to Germany due to Matthaus Freundlich's ill-health. He however died during the voyage across Germany. In 1750, Christian and Rebecca Protten had a daughter, Anna Maria Protten who died in infancy in Herrnhut, Dresden in Sachsen, Germany.

== Death and legacy ==
Christian Jacob Protten died in 1769 in Christiansborg, Accra, leaving his wife, Rebecca, widowed for a second time. She had not fully acclimatised to the Gold Coast and the Moravian missionaries contemplated sending her back to Saint Thomas. As she was in poor health, it was decided she remained on the Gold Coast, where she eventually died in 1780, aged 62 years. The appendix to Protten's booklet was the first published grammar of an indigenous language of the Gold Coast. His linguistic work in the Ga language predated that of the German philologist and Basel missionary, Johannes Zimmermann (1825–1876) by a century. Zimmerman also translated the entire Bible into the Ga language. In effect, his grammatical output was an example for both Zimmermann and the Basel Mission pastor and historian, Carl Christian Reindorf (1834–1917), whose literary masterpiece, The History of the Gold Coast and Asante was written in the Ga and English languages and published in 1895 in Basel. Moreover, as a mulatto or an Atlantic Creole, Protten was able to hone his linguistic talents and abilities by blending his African upbringing and his European education, through a spatial awareness of the missionary settings he lived in during the 1700s.

== Literature ==
- Sebald, Peter (1994) “Christian Jacob Protten Africanus (1715–1769) – erster Missionar einer deutschen Missionsgesellschaft in Schwarzafrika” Kolonien und Missionen. pp. 109–121
- Fay, Robert (2005), “Protten, Christian Jacob (1715–1769), Religious Educator, Missionary” Oxford: Oxford University Press
- Frederiks, Martha Theodora; Rose, Maximilian (23 October 2024). "Christian Protten: A Transcription and Translation of Two Early Writings". Journal of Moravian History. 24 (2): 134–179
