= Charlie Hutchison =

British communist activist (1918–1993)

- Hutchison during the Second World War
- Born: Charles William Duncan Hutchison; 10 May 1918; Eynsham, Oxfordshire, England
- Died: March 1993 (aged 74–75); Bournemouth, England
- Spouse(s): Patricia Holloway, m. 1947
- Children: 3
- Military career
- Allegiance: Spanish Republic; United Kingdom
- Branch: UK Territorial Army. International Brigade's British Battalion; British Army's Royal Army Service Corps (RASC)
- Service years: International Brigade 1936–1939; British Army 1930s, 1940–1946
- Awards: France and Germany Star; War Medal; Defence Medal

Charles William Duncan Hutchison (10 May 1918 – March 1993) was a Black-British anti-fascist, soldier, and ambulance driver noted for being the only Black-British member of the International Brigades during the Spanish Civil War. In Spain he was one of the youngest, one of the longest serving, and one of the first English-speaking volunteers. Citing his experiences as a man of colour and his childhood spent in an orphanage, Hutchison was an ardent anti-fascist and was involved in helping organise anti-fascist activists that took part in the Battle of Cable Street. Following Britain's declaration of war against Nazi Germany, Hutchison served in the British Army between 1940 and 1946. Hutchison spent almost 10 years engaged in battles against various fascist forces throughout Europe, before starting a family in 1947 and living the rest of his life quietly in South England.

The details of his life were not fully revealed to historians until 2019, following a history project started by London school children. In 2022, a campaign began to raise money for a statue of him to be erected in Oxford.

== Early life and orphanage ==
Charlie Hutchison was born on 10 May 1918 in Eynsham, west of Oxford. (Note: The Museum of Oxford notes that the exact location of Hutchison's birth has been contested: "Historian Richard Baxell named Witney as Charlie’s birthplace, however his daughter Susan says Charlie was born in Eynsham. Charlie's place of birth is further complicated by documents from the Spanish Civil War which have shown that Charlie himself once named Oxford as his place of origin.") He was the fourth of five children of Lilly Rose (Harper) from Eynsham, and Charles Francis Hutchison from the Gold Coast (now Ghana). His father was the author of The Pen-Pictures of Modern Africans and African Celebrities

By age 3, Charlie Hutchison was listed as being in foster care.

=== Orphanage ===
When Charlie was a child, his father often visited the Gold Coast, before unexpectedly disappearing, leaving Hutchison's mother in severe mental and financial hardship. Hutchison and one of his sisters were temporarily taken to the National Children's Home and Orphanage in Harpenden, Hertfordshire. In 1933 after spending several years in the orphanage, Hutchison was allowed to leave and was reunited with his mother, who was living in Fulham.

=== Teenage years in London ===
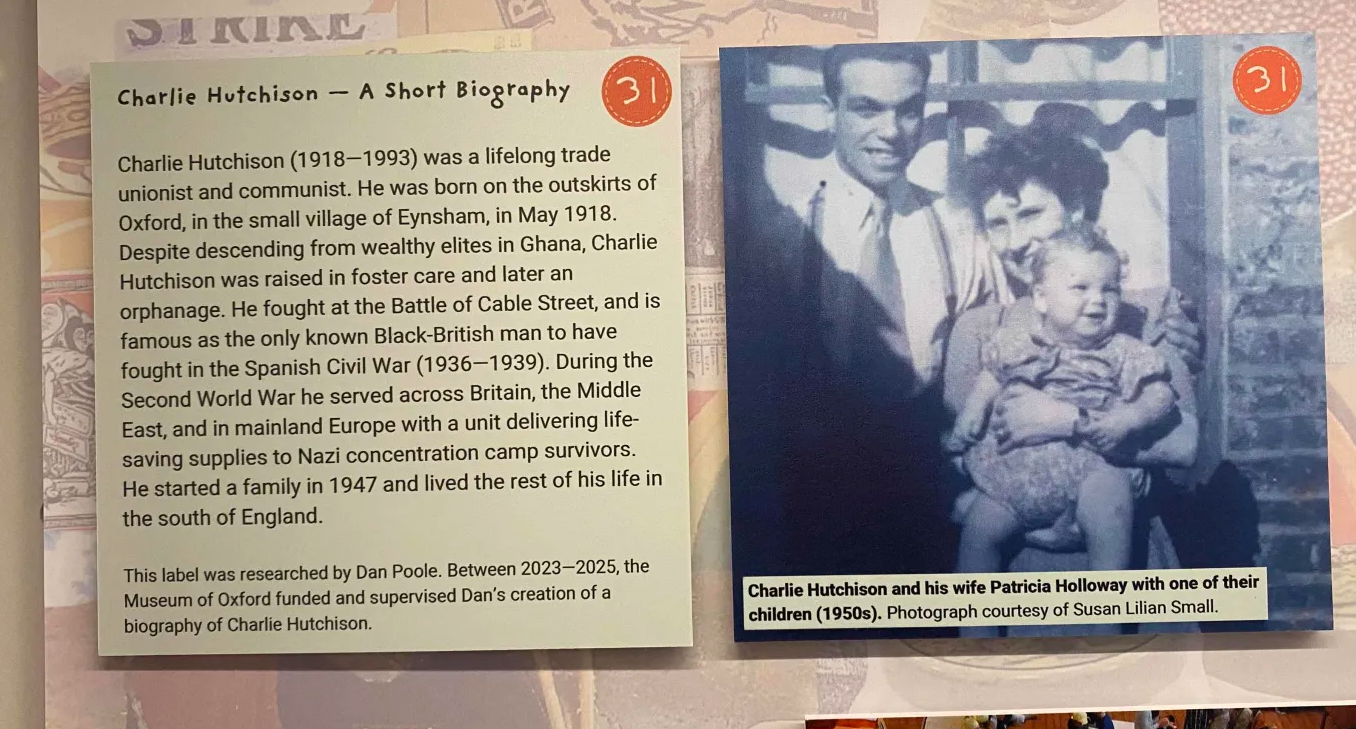
A museum display featuring Charlie Hutchison, 2025, Museum of Oxford

By 1935, Hutchison had joined the Communist Party of Great Britain (CPGB), and its youth wing, the Young Communist League (YCL). He became the branch leader of the YCL in Fulham, while also working as a lorry driver's assistant. During his teenage years in London, he also joined the Territorial Army. In 1936 he participated in the Battle of Cable Street against the British Union of Fascists.

== Spanish Civil War ==
Charlie Hutchison is notable for being the only known Black-British person to have fought in the Spanish Civil War, in addition to possibly being the longest serving foreign volunteer from Britain. During the Spanish Civil War, Hutchison arrived in Spain in late 1936 and joined the International Brigades to fight against the Nationalist faction supported by Fascist Italy and Nazi Germany during the Spanish Civil War. According to military documents recording Charlie's service, he participated in at least twelve battles during the war.

=== Battle of Lopera ===
Becoming a machine-gunner, he was joined by many fellow London activists, including Winston Churchill's nephew Esmond Romilly, Charles Darwin's great-grandson John Cornford, Communist Party intellectual Ralph Winston Fox. The British Battalion had not yet been fully formed by the time Hutchison arrived in Spain, so he joined the British and Irish dominated No. 1 Company of the mainly French Marseillaise Brigade (XIV International Brigade).

In December 1936, Hutchison participated in the Battle of Lopera, a two-day skirmish that wiped out most of Charlie's unit. Of the 145 members of Charlie's unit, only 67 survived the Battle of Lopera. During this battle, his fellow communist volunteers Fox and Cornford were killed, and Hutchison was badly wounded. According to Bill Alexander of the British Battalion, Hutchison refused to be sent back to Britain and instead served as an ambulance driver.

=== Later service ===
During the war, Hutchison survived multiple shrapnel wounds and frostbite. He also became a target of a smear campaign by the British Daily Mail newspaper.

In April 1937, Hutchison's mother contacted the Republican government and pleaded with them to force him to return to Britain. Hutchison requested temporary leave, yet due to a logistics blunder, leave was not granted. Despite assurances from his superiors that he deserved to be granted military leave, it never materialised. He returned to Britain in early 1939 with the help of the Red cross. Shortly after returning to Britain, he participated in a charity convoy to raise funds for medical aid to be sent to Republican Spain.

When asked why he fought in Spain, Hutchison said: "I am half black, I grew up in the National Children's Home and Orphanage. Fascism meant hunger and war."

== Second World War ==
=== England and imprisonment (1940-1943) ===
After returning to the UK, Hutchison had little time to conduct further communist activism before Britain entered the Second World War. In early 1940 he joined the Royal Army Service Corps (RASC) and was stationed and trained in Kent, England. Some evidence suggests that he participated in the Dunkirk evacuation, however this has not been definitively proven.

In mid-1940 Charlie was stationed in Somerset. During this time, he came into contact with refugees whose houses had been destroyed by the Blitz, and began giving the refugees Army clothes and boots which the refugees would then sell to local people. Charlie was caught and sentenced to 3-months of prison labour in HMP Exeter, but was released early and allowed to return to his previous post.

=== Middle East and Europe (1943-1944) ===
Between the years 1943 and 1944, Charlie's unit and his unit passed through Scotland, Sierra Leone, South Africa, and were later stationed in India, Iraq, Iran, and possibly Egypt, before returning to Britain. In June 1944, Charlie's unit were sent to assist the Allied invasion of mainland Europe, and landed in Normandy, France, only a shortly after D-Day. Charlie and his unit participated in the liberation of France and then later Belgium, where Charlie witnessed the liberation of Brussels. In 1945 they took part in the liberation of the Netherlands and the invasion of Nazi Germany.

=== Bergen-Belsen Concentration Camp (1945) ===
Shortly after the liberation of Bergen-Belsen concentration camp, Charlie was serving in a logistics unit of the RASC delivering food and medical supplies to the survivors. In his later life, Charlie said that being “asked to play in a dance band a few days after Belsen was liberated” was one of the key memories in his life.

== Post-war life ==
=== Personal life ===
Charlie left the British military in 1946, and returned to Fulham and in 1947 married a fellow communist called Patricia Holloway. He resumed his work as a lorry driver and was an active member of the Transport and General Workers' Union. Charlie used the driving and engineering skills he had accrued during wartime to financially support his family. In 1961 Charlie and his family saved enough money to purchase a house in High Wycombe, where they cared for foster children.

=== Political activism ===
During the Cold War, Charlie and his family participated in nuclear disarmament demonstrations, and also supported the anti-apartheid movement by boycotting South African products. Hutchison sent his children to secular socialist themed Sunday schools.

Charlie became more politically active after his retirement in the mid-1960s. During the 1984–1985 United Kingdom miners' strike, Charlie and his family sheltered miners in their home. Hutchison played a role in the creation of the International Brigade memorial in Jubilee Gardens, Lambeth, London.

== Death and legacy ==
Spending the remainder of his life as a communist activist, Hutchison died in Bournemouth in March 1993, aged 74.

Charlie Hutchison was initially forgotten by historians until 2018 when Richard Baxell published an article on Charlie using documents gathered from British and Soviet archives.

In 2019, a commemorative event was held at the Marx Memorial Library in London to celebrate the life of Charlie Hutchison as a part of Black History Month. Attendees included 16 members of Hutchison's family and students from Newham Sixth Form College, who showcased their art and poetry projects to celebrate Hutchison's life and examine his reasons for fighting in Spain. During the event, Hutchison's son John spoke of his experiences being raised by his father, describing Charlie's love of boxing and that their home was filled with "books by Marx, Salinger, Steinbeck and Hugo". The research into Hutchison's life conducted by the sixth-form students would lead to the creation of their college's African Studies Centre. Noah Anthony Enahoro, grandson of Nigerian independence leader Anthony Enahoro, was one of the student researchers who presented their findings to Hutchison's family.

Much of the information about Hutchison's life has only been discovered recently and has been recorded in few histories of the Spanish Civil War, one being a short entry in the Communist Party of Britain's Red Lives (2020).

In October 2022, a campaign was started by local activists and Hutchison's family to raise money for a statue of him to be erected in Oxford city centre. If successful, it would be the first statue of a black person erected in the city.

Oxford University's Wadham College named an outreach program after Charlie Hutchison, called the "Charlie Hutchison Project."

In 2023 the Museum of Oxford financed research into a Charlie Hutchison biography.

== See also ==
- Charles Francis Hutchison
- Dorothy Kuya
- Claudia Jones
- Billy Strachan
- Trevor Carter
- Len Johnson
