= Charles Francis Hutchison =

British surveyor

Charles Francis Hutchison (1879, Cape Coast - ca. 1940, Lagos) was a surveyor and scholar active in the British Gold Coast. He wrote The Pen-Pictures of Modern Africans and African Celebrities.

Hutchison was born with varied African, Dutch, and Scottish ancestors. He was a great-great-grandson of Carel Hendrik Bartels (1792 – 1850).

== See also ==
- Charlie Hutchison
- Gold Coast Euro-Africans
