= Jan Niezer =

Trader on the Dutch Gold Coast

- Born: c. 1756; Akwida, modern day Ghana
- Died: 1822 (aged 65–66)
- Occupation: Euro-African trader
- Known for: Important political figure during the Ashanti wars of the early 19th century

Jan Niezer (c. 1756–1822) was a Euro-African trader in the Dutch Gold Coast. In his day and age, he was the richest Mulatto trader on the Gold Coast. Furthermore, Niezer was an important political figure during the Ashanti wars of the early 19th century. His most important trade interest was the Atlantic slave trade, until it was abolished by the Netherlands in 1814.

== Early life ==
Niezer was born in Akwida as the son of a German doctor's assistant in the service of the Dutch West India Company, and an African woman named Manzang. He first travelled with his father to Europe in January 1764, where he attended school.

== Career and war ==
Around 1770, Jan Niezer returned to the Gold Coast alone, joining the Dutch West India Company, like his father. After having worked for the company for 16 years, first as a soldier and later as an assistant of the civil administration, Niezer again went to Europe in 1785, presumably to employ himself as a merchant with a European company. He signed himself up with Louyssen & Son, one of the largest Dutch trading houses of the age, which among others occupied itself with the slave trade.

Back in the Gold Coast, Niezer encountered difficulty establishing himself as a private trader, as he was not an official trader of the Dutch West India Company, and was thus hindered by the latter's trade monopoly. Nevertheless, he became one of the most influential traders in Elmina. When the Dutch East India Company was dissolved in 1791, Niezer took his chance to become the biggest private trader on the coast.

=== Move to Accra ===
In 1793, Niezer moved to Accra, since the slave trade in Elmina had become unprofitable due to Fante-Ashanti wars. Because of the conflict, Fante had blocked the so-called western trade route between Elmina and the Ashanti Empire. Accra was the endpoint of the so-called eastern trade route, which was safe from Fante and Akim disruptions. Furthermore, Accra was a trading point not only for the Dutch at Fort Crêvecoeur, but also for the British at Fort James, and the Danish at Fort Christiansborg, making Accra a safe place to establish oneself. In September 1794 Niezer wrote Louyssen that he was well-acquainted in the interior and that he was able to supply 500 slaves per year, as well as gold and ivory.

1794 was also the beginning of a twenty-year episode in the history of the Dutch Gold Coast, in which the colony was increasingly severed from its home country due to wars in Europe. The diminishing supply of goods from Europe did not bother Niezer too much, as he had no problems with trading with other European nations on the coast. This invited other problems, however, among others with the commander of the British Fort James, who ordered the bombardment of Niezer's property if Niezer once again tried to load slaves on a non-British ship.

In 1806, war arose between the people of Accra and other inhabitants of the coast on one side, and the Akuapem on the other. An Accra man named Apho allegedly betrayed his people in this war by signalling by drums where his people's army was. Apho then sought refuge with Jan Niezer, for whom he had worked earlier. Niezer gave the man refuge, which invited a mob of angry Accrans to burn and plunder his property. The Dutch and Danish commander tried to intervene in the conflict, as they had no interest in warring parties just outside their forts. Negotiations between the parties failed, however, leaving Niezer with no option but to release Apho to the mob, which subsequently killed him.

=== Back to Elmina ===
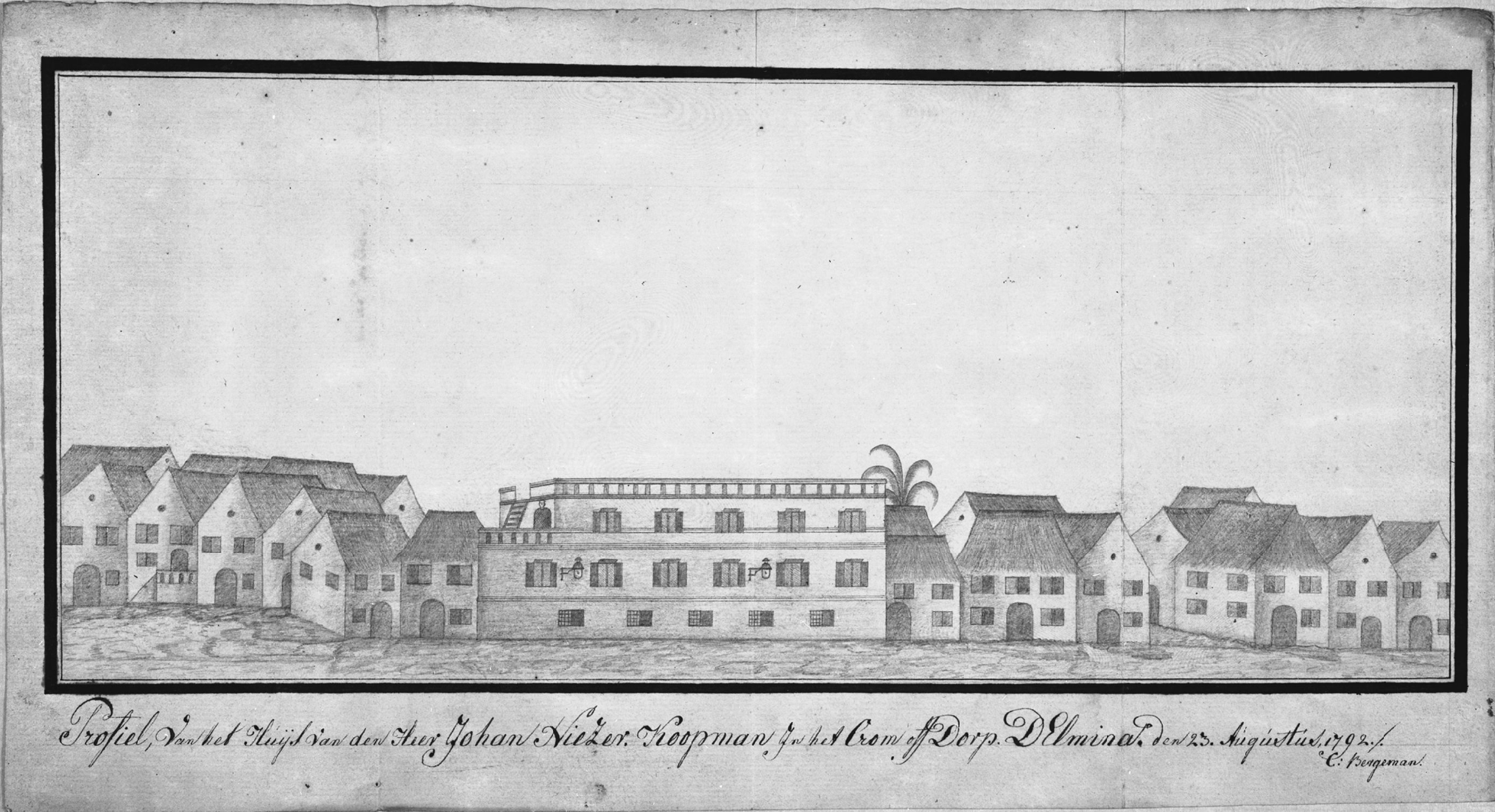
The house of Jan Niezer in Elmina, 1792

In the same year, the Ashanti–Fante War started as well. As the Ashanti had won the Battle of Abora, Niezer was confident that the western trade route would soon be open again, and left for Elmina. He left one of his sons behind to serve as his trade agent. In 1809, a battle ensued between coastal people and the Elminese. Jan Niezer supplied the Elminese with weapons and munition worth 11,000 Dutch guilders, and led a battle group of around 200 men against the aggressors. Elmina withstood the attack and was eventually liberated by an Ashanti army.

=== Arrest and journey to the Netherlands ===
In March 1818, Niezer was arrested by Herman Willem Daendels on the charge that he tried to incite the king of Elmina to kill Daendels. In May of the same year, Daendels died, however, bringing the Dutch administration on the Gold Coast in a difficult situation. The new administration did not feel much for continuing Niezer's trial, but could not let Niezer go without losing face. Niezer was then given the opportunity to defend himself in the Netherlands, which Niezer gladly took up. Via Suriname he arrived in the Netherlands, where he was acquitted of all wrongdoing.

== Last years on the Gold Coast ==
Little is known about Niezer's last years, but certain is that he returned to the Gold Coast on 18 February 1819. His sons had in the meantime sold much of his property and spent most of his wealth, so that Niezer in 1821 was unable to pay the debt he owed in Cape Coast. In the same year, he also tried to set up a cotton plantation just outside Elmina, although this was not very successful.

In 1822, Niezer died in Elmina, 66 years of age.
