= Smyly Chinery =

Ghanaian civil servant (1923-2024)

Smyly Chinery CV
- Born: Smyly Cleland Amu Chinery; 12 March 1923; Accra, Gold Coast
- Died: 7 October 2024 (aged 101); Accra, Ghana
- Citizenship: (Ghana) Ghanaian
- Education: Adisadel College; Achimota College; University of Glasgow (M.A.)
- Occupation: Civil Servant
- Spouse: Vera Constancia Awaya Whitaker (m. 1954; died 2011)
- Children: 5
- Parents: Cecil Cleland Chinery (father); Kate Kotey (mother)
- Relatives: Alexander Worthy Clerk (great-great-grandfather); Peter Hall (great-grand uncle); Clerk family Hesse family

Smyly Cleland Amu Chinery, CV (12 March 1923 – 7 October 2024) was a Ghanaian civil servant who became one of Ghana's first District Commissioners in the country’s Northern Region.

== Early life and education ==
He was born on 12 March 1923 in Accra, Gold Coast to Cecil Cleland Chinery and Kate Chinery (née Kotey). His formative years were spent with his grandparents, Virginia and Arthur Robert Nii Armah Twetewgu Chinery. A member of the Ga peoples of Accra, he had Gold Coast Euro-African heritage. He was a descendant of both John Hall and Alexander Worthy Clerk, nineteenth century Jamaican Moravian missionaries who arrived on the Gold Coast in 1843. He was educated at the St. Mary’s Anglican Elementary School and the Bishop Boys’ School, both in Accra. For his secondary education, he enrolled at Adisadel College, where he was a student from 1939 to 1944 and was elected the Head Prefect from 1943 to 1944. He later attended Achimota College from 1946 to 1948 for his intermediary pre-university studies. After winning a scholarship from the British Government in 1948, he proceeded to the United Kingdom where he enrolled at the University of Glasgow in Scotland. At Glasgow, he studied Classics, Chemistry and Economics and graduated with a Master of Arts (MA) degree in 1952.

== Career ==
Before his intermediary studies at Achimota, he worked at the Ministry of Agriculture from 1944 to 1946. Upon his return from Scotland in 1952, Chinery joined the administrative class of Gold Coast Civil Service and was posted to the Ministry of Finance as an Administrative Officer. In 1952, he was transferred to the then Northern Territories where he became a District Commissioner. As District Administrative Officer, he first served in the District of Zuarungu and later, between 1954 and 1958, he held similar positions in Bawku, Gambaga, Navrongo, Salaga and Wa. As District Commissioner, he concurrently performed the constitutional duties of a Magistrate, and adjudicated cases related to petty political disputes related to local governance and the traditional institution of chieftaincy.

In 1958, Chinery joined the Regional Office in Tamale working as the Regional Administrative Officer/Secretary to the Regional Commissioner. He moved to Bolgatanga in the erstwhile Upper Region in 1960, serving until 1964, as the first Regional Administrative Officer under the leadership of the region's first Regional Commissioner, Ayeebo Asumda and to support the rapid development and industrialization vision of Ghana’s first president and independence leader, Kwame Nkrumah. This period saw accelerated development of infrastructure and social amenities such as bridges, roads and food processing factories.

He returned to Accra and served as the Principal Assistant Secretary at the Establishment Secretariat from 1964 to 1966. From 1966 to 1969, he became a Principal Secretary in Tamale and served as the Regional Administrative Officer and a member of the three-person Regional Committee of Administration. Between 1969 and 1973, he was a Principal Secretary at the Ministry of Rural Development, Office of Government Machinery, Office of the President and the Ministry of Defence. He was also seconded to Ford Foundation during this period.

He was promoted in 1973 to become the Deputy Secretary to Cabinet, attached to the Special Services Division, serving until his retirement in 1978.

== Later life ==
After his retirement from public service in 1978, he received a national honour, Member of the Order of the Volta (Civil Division). He went into private business, started his own consultancy and engaged in different pursuits, including rice farming, the fishing business and secretarial services. He closed his secretarial services business in 2000.

== Personal life ==
Chinery married his childhood friend, Vera Constancia Awaya Whitaker on 18 December 1954 in Accra. His wife died in September 2011. They had five children – Ofei Djoleto (1946 – 2016), Alexandra Naa Abia (born 1955), Roger Dodu (born 1956) Cecil Claude Nii Addy (1958-2000); Thomas Darku (1959). He had 11 grandchildren and 14 great-grandchildren. A lifelong Anglican, Chinery was a congregant at the Holy Trinity Cathedral in Accra. In his youth, he had served as an Altar Boy at the Cathedral and a member of the church choir.

He was a polyglot and was fluent in English, Ga, Twi, Kusaal, Frafra and Dagbani. He also spoke conversational French.

== Death ==
Smyly Chinery died in Accra on 7 October 2024 at the age of 101. His funeral service was held at the Holy Trinity Cathedral in Accra.
