= Willem Jan Derx =

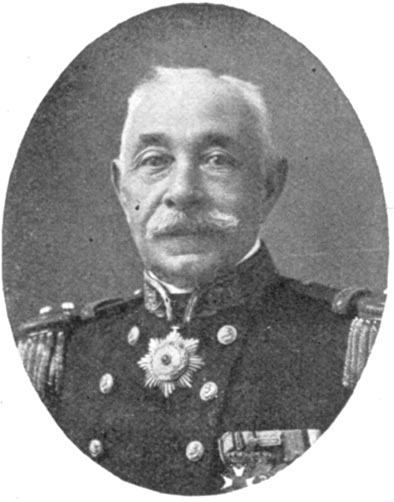
- Vice admiral Willem Jan Derx
- Born: March 26, 1844; Elmina, Dutch Gold Coast
- Died: April 29, 1913 (aged 69); Haarlem, Netherlands
- Military career
- Allegiance: Netherlands
- Branch: Royal Netherlands Navy
- Rank: Vice admiral
- Conflicts: Aceh War

Willem Jan Derx (26 March 1844 – 29 April 1913) was a vice admiral of the Royal Netherlands Navy.

== Biography ==
Willem Jan Derx was born in Elmina on the Dutch Gold Coast to governor Willem George Frederik Derx and Jacoba Araba Bartels, daughter of the Euro-African trader Carel Hendrik Bartels. In 1850, he left the Gold Coast with his father and two brothers to never return to Africa again.

Derx was installed as midshipman on 16 September 1863, and was promoted to lieutenant on 1 July 1867, lieutenant commander on 1 January 1879, to commander on 16 December 1890, to captain on 1 February 1895, to schout-bij-nacht in 1902, and to vice admiral in 1904.

Derx married Margaretha Jannette van Doorn in 1875 in Haarlem. He retired from the military in 1906 and died in Haarlem on 29 April 1913.

== Decorations ==
- Order of the Netherlands Lion
- Order of the Double Dragon

== Personal life ==
Derx married Margaretha Jannette van Doorn in Haarlem on 12 August 1875. They had three children.
