= Willem George Frederik Derx =

Dutch civil servant

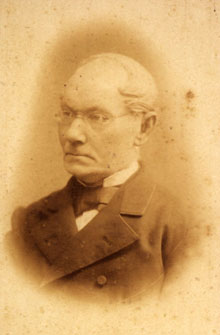

Governor of the Dutch Gold Coast
- ad interim
- In office 6 November 1856 – 29 April 1857
- Monarch: William III of the Netherlands
- Preceded by: Petrus Jacobus Runckel
- Succeeded by: Jules van den Bossche
- ad interim
- In office 9 June 1846 – 10 July 1847
- Monarch: William III of the Netherlands
- Preceded by: Anthony van der Eb
- Succeeded by: Anthony van der Eb

Personal details
- Born: 8 May 1813 Nijmegen, Netherlands
- Died: 10 December 1890 (aged 77) Haarlem, Netherlands
- Spouse(s): Jacoba Araba Bartels; Anna Frederika Lamslag

Willem George Frederik Derx (born 8 May 1813 – 10 December 1890) was a Dutch civil servant, who made a career in the administration on the Dutch Gold Coast.

== Biography ==
Derx was born in Nijmegen to Johan Henrich Derx, who was originally from the Landgraviate of Hesse-Kassel, contemporary Germany, and Maria Christina Lijtgen from Zaltbommel.

Derx joined the colonial administration of the Dutch Gold Coast in 1838, when the colony was reorganized in the wake of the Dutch–Ahanta War. He eventually became bookkeeper and officer of justice of the colony. During governor Anthony van der Eb's year-long leave to the Netherlands between 1846 and 1847, Derx was acting governor.

During this first period at the Gold Coast, Derx married Jacoba Araba Bartels, daughter of the Euro-African trader Carel Hendrik Bartels, with whom he had three sons. His second son Willem Jan Derx would become a vice admiral of the Royal Netherlands Navy. After Jacoba Araba died during childbirth in 1848, Derx fathered a son and a daughter with another, unknown woman while on the Gold Coast.

According to historian Larry Yarak, Derx was less fortunate in the trading business than his boss, governor Van der Eb, which tempted him to compensate his meagre salary by other means; he was frequently accused by the local rulers of Elmina of abusing his position of fiscal by demanding high fines. In one particular case in 1844, Derx ordered the King of Elmina to pay a fine of four ounces of gold for having sentenced the prominent Elmina trader Kweku Akwa for overcharging his customers. Eventually the local rulers of Elmina issued a petition of grievances about Derx' conduct to governor Van der Eb, but it is unsure what consequences this had.

Derx apparently left the Gold Coast in the late 1840s and married Anna Frederika Lamslag in the Netherlands, with whom he had three sons and three daughters.

=== Return to the Gold Coast ===
The Dutch government decided in 1855 to resume the recruitment of soldiers for the Royal Netherlands East Indies Army on the Gold Coast, and appointed Derx as the commissioner in charge. Apparently Derx was also interested in taking the position because he grew increasingly concerned about the management of the estate of his late father-in-law Carel Hendrik Bartels, who had died in 1850, by Bartels' son Carel Bartels. Derx arrived on 22 October 1856 in Cape Coast and was then escorted to Elmina. Since the previous governor Hero Schomerus had died a month earlier on 25 September, Derx was also to become governor of the Dutch Gold Coast. This proved controversial, both with the Dutch colonial administrators, who felt passed by, and with the local population of Elmina, who accused Derx of having handled a dispute between Elmina wards unadvisedly in 1846, during his previous stint as governor.

Both groups tried to prevent Derx from taking office, to no avail. Derx however wrote the Minister of Colonies that although he had taken the oath of office, he "stood alone" and was not able to fulfil his duties. Within half a year he was recalled to the Netherlands.
