= Bartell =

Bartell is an English surname and given name. It may refer to:

== Companies ==
- Bartell Drugs, an American retail pharmacy chain
- Bartell Group, a former American broadcasting company
- Bartell (guitars), a maker of electric guitars and basses, from 1964 to 1969

== People ==
=== Given name ===
- Bartell LaRue (1932–1990), American voice actor

=== Surname ===
- Dick Bartell (1907–1995), American baseball player
- Floyd Bartell (1883–1961), American chemist
- Harry Bartell (1913–2004), American actor and announcer
- Jason Bartell, American musician known as Mythless
- Lawrence Bartell (1923–2017), American chemist
- Michael Bartell, American candidate in the 1950 New York state election
- Phillip J. Bartell (born 1970), American filmmaker
- Ron Bartell (born 1982), American football player
- Seth Bartell, a victim of the 2003 Rocori High School shooting

== Other uses ==
- Bartell (album), a 2005 compilation album by The Moog Cookbook
- Bartell D'Arcy, a fictional character in "The Dead", a James Joyce short story
- Bartell mechanism, an intramolecular movement

== See also ==
- Bartel (disambiguation)
