= William Smith (surveyor) =

English surveyor

William Smith was an English surveyor employed by the Royal African Company (RAC) in 1726 to survey their castles in West Africa. The RAC dispatched him in response to reports of their castles deteriorating conditions and low personnel numbers. His account of the trip, A new voyage to Guinea, was published posthumously in 1744, with a second edition being published in 1745. The full title of his book was A new voyage to Guinea: describing the customs, manners, soil, manual arts, agriculture, trade, employments, languages, ranks of distinction climate, habits, buildings, education, habitations, diversions, marriages, and whatever else is memorable among the inhabitants. In the book, Smith gave an account of several locations in West Africa, including Fort Tantumquery and Fort Winneba.

Upon Smith's return to London in September 1727, he submitted a report to the RAC indicating they could not afford the maintenance costs of the castles, which amounted to about £13,500 by 1731. In response to this, in 1730 the British Parliament had voted to grant an annual subsidy of £10,000 to the RAC so their castles could be properly maintained. As historian Robert W. Harms noted in his 2002 work The Diligent: A Voyage Through the Worlds Of The Slave Trade, the subsidy resulted in the British government assuming financial responsibility for the RAC's establishments along the Gold Coast.
