= Otuam =

Town in the Central Region, Ghana

Coordinates: 5.221°N 0.808°W

Otuam (also Tantum) is a town in Ekumfi District, Central Region, Ghana.

Nana Amuah-Afenyi VI (born Peggielene Bartels in 1953), known informally as King Peggy, is the reigning chief of the Ebriadze Abusua, one of the seven major clans which form the township. She has worked as a secretary for the Embassy of Ghana in Washington, D.C. since the 1970s.

== History ==
It is the site where the Royal African Company built Fort Tantumquery in the 1720s.
