= Petrus Jacobus Runckel =

Dutch colonial government official

Governor of the Dutch Gold Coast
- ad interim
- In office 25 September 1856 – 6 November 1856
- Monarch: William III of the Netherlands
- Preceded by: Hero Schomerus
- Succeeded by: Willem George Frederik Derx

Personal details
- Born: 10 September 1822 Noordwijk-Binnen, Netherlands
- Died: 15 December 1860 (aged 38) Arnhem, Netherlands
- Spouse(s): Adjuah Nambah; Effua Anna Ruhle

Petrus Jacobus Runckel (born 10 September 1822 – 15 December 1860) was a Dutch colonial government official, who made a career in the administration on the Dutch Gold Coast.

== Biography ==
Runckel was probably born in Noordwijk-Binnen, the Netherlands to Petrus Jacobus Runckel sr. and Geertruida Catharina Escher. He was appointed assistant in the government of the Gold Coast by royal decree of 18 November 1845. After working in Elmina Castle for five years, he was appointed commandant of Fort Orange at Dutch Sekondi. In this office, he was also responsible for the Dutch gold mining enterprise in Dabokrom.

In June 1851, Runckel returned to the Netherlands on leave, to recover from illness. When he returned to the coast in August, he was appointed to the offices of bookkeeper, public prosecutor, government secretary and cashier, which made him second in command. After governor Hero Schomerus died in office on 25 September 1856, Runckel became governor ad interim. A month later, government commissioner Willem George Frederik Derx arrived on the Gold Coast, charged by the Dutch government to resume the recruitment of soldiers for the Netherlands East Indies Army. According to his instructions, Derx was to assume the office of governor in case of absence or death of the governor. Derx's impopularity with both the Elminese and the local administration made this a controversial move. Runckel tried to prevent Derx from taking office to no avail, but Derx gave up his governorship soon thereafter. Runckel was honourably discharged from service in December 1857 on medical grounds, as he suffered from splenomegaly and facial nerve paralysis.

Runckel died in Arnhem on 15 December 1860.

== Personal life ==
During his service on the Gold Coast, Runckel was married according to local rites to Effua Anna Rühle, daughter of Anthony Rühle. They had at least one daughter together, Maria Adriana Runckel.
