= Bartel =

Bartel is a given name and surname. Notable people with the name include:

== Given name ==
- Bartel, one of the companions of Saint Nicholas
- Bartel J. Jonkman (1884–1955), American politician
- Bartel Leendert van der Waerden (1903–1996), Dutch mathematician

== Surname ==
- Beate Bartel, member of the German band Liaisons Dangereuses
- Jimmy Bartel (born 1983), Australian footballer
- Jonny Ray Bartel, member of the American band The Knitters
- Kazimierz Bartel (1882–1941), Polish mathematician, diplomat, and politician
- Mateusz Bartel (born 1985), Polish chess grandmaster
- Max Bartel (1879–1914), German entomologist
- Paul Bartel (1938–2000), American actor, writer, and director
- Richard Bartel (born 1983), American football player
- Ryszard Bartel (1897–1982), Polish aeronautical engineer and aircraft designer

== See also ==
- Bartell (disambiguation)
- Bartels (disambiguation)
- Barthel
