= Jacob Huydecoper =

Dutch Gold Coast civil servant

Dutch envoy to the Kingdom of Ashanti
- In office 23 March 1838 – 31 March 1842
- Preceded by: Jacobus de Bruijn
- Succeeded by: Hendrik Severinus Pel

Personal details
- Born: Jacob Peter Huydecoper; 11 November 1811; Elmina, Dutch Gold Coast
- Died: 12 February 1845 (aged 33); Elmina, Dutch Gold Coast
- Parent: Willem Huydecoper (father)
- Known for: Belanda Hitam recruitment
- Employer: Dutch East Indies Army

Jacob Peter Huydecoper (11 November 1811 – 12 February 1845) was an early 19th-century Elmina Euro-African civil servant and diplomat on the Dutch Gold Coast.

== Early life ==
Jacob Huydecoper was born in Elmina to Willem Huydecoper and a Fante woman named Akosewa Kombati. He was a member of the prominent Afro-European Huydecoper family, which traces its ancestor to Jan Pieter Theodoor Huydecoper, a Director-General of the Dutch Gold Coast in the 18th century.

== Career ==
Huydecoper started his career in the colonial administration of the Dutch Gold Coast in July 1832, when he was installed as a provisional assistant at Elmina. He became a regular assistant on 15 December 1836.

Huydecoper was charged with the recruitment of the so-called Belanda Hitam, Gold Coastan and Akan recruitments for the Royal Netherlands East Indies Army, at the Ashanti capital of Kumasi, between 1838 and 1842. With this move, he followed in the footstep of his father, who also was the Dutch envoy at the Ashanti court between 1816 and 1817.

== Death and legacy ==
Huydecoper returned from Kumasi on 1 February 1842, and was honourably discharged of all his duties on 31 March 1842. Three years later, Huydecoper died in Elmina at the age of 33.

Huydecoper is considered the initiator of the Methodist mission in Elmina, established in 1842, after he himself was converted to Christianity by The Reverend Thomas Birch Freeman when the latter was stationed at Kumasi in 1839.
