= Anthony van der Eb =

Dutch civil servant

Governor of the Dutch Gold Coast
- In office 10 July 1847 – 21 September 1852
- Monarchs: William III of the Netherlands; William II of the Netherlands
- Preceded by: Willem George Frederik Derx
- Succeeded by: Hero Schomerus
- In office 11 March 1840 – 9 June 1846
- Monarchs: William II of the Netherlands; William I of the Netherlands
- Preceded by: Hendrik Bosch
- Succeeded by: Willem George Frederik Derx
- ad interim
- In office 29 October 1837 – 5 August 1838
- Monarch: William I of the Netherlands
- Preceded by: Hendrik Tonneboeijer
- Succeeded by: Hendrik Bosch

Personal details
- Born: 3 January 1813 Rotterdam, Netherlands
- Died: 21 September 1852 (aged 39) Elmina, Dutch Gold Coast
- Spouse(s): Manza Henrietta Bartels; Efua Henrietta Huydecoper

Anthony van der Eb (born 3 January 1813 – 21 September 1852) was a Dutch civil servant, who made a career in the administration on the Dutch Gold Coast.

== Biography ==
Van der Eb was born in Rotterdam on 3 January 1813 to Hendrik van der Eb and Marianne Jacoba Lessueur. On 5 October 1833, he was installed as assistant, with the military rank of second lieutenant, to the Dutch Gold Coast. After Acting Commander Hendrik Tonneboeijer died during the Dutch–Ahanta War, the young Van der Eb became Acting Commander himself between 1837 and 1838. When major general Jan Verveer visited the Gold Coast to avenge the Ahanta and to reform the government of the colony, he wrote the following about Van der Eb:

This civil servant is by approximation 25 years old and is of good behaviour, but has few mental capacities and even less education to be regarded as useful for matters of importance in public service. Moreover, the tradesman's spirit has taken such root in Mr Van der Eb and the trade has made him so much profit that it is doubtful that he would accept the position of governor of this colony if it were under the condition of giving up his personal trade. Nevertheless, it cannot be denied that his service on the Coast has given him some experience, which should be made of use now the colony's government has been completely replaced.

— Major general J. Verveer,

Even though Verveer's report was not entirely positive, Van der Eb was installed as Governor of the Dutch Gold Coast by royal decree on 11 March 1840. He was licensed to conduct private trade in 1842 and quickly became the head agent for the Rotterdam firm of H. van Rijckevorsel and ordinary agent for the Amsterdam firm of J. Boelen & Co.

Van der Eb was granted leave for six months in 1846, and left the Gold Coast on 9 July. His leave was eventually extended until 31 March 1847, and he arrived back on the Gold Coast on 10 July of the said year.

On 7 November 1847, he sentenced the Elminese trader Adjua Gyapiaba to lifelong banishment in the East or West Indies for "serious calumnies and diatribes against the Dutch Government, the Elminese African government and the whole population of this place."

Van der Eb was requested by the Dutch government to compile a compendium of local laws and customs, a task which he delegated to a subordinate. The compendium was eventually submitted to the Ministry of Colonies in 1851. This work, which was subsequently published in 1931 in the Bijdragen tot de Taal-, Land- en Volkenkunde van Nederlandsch-Indië, has been an important source for social scientists on the Gold Coast societies.

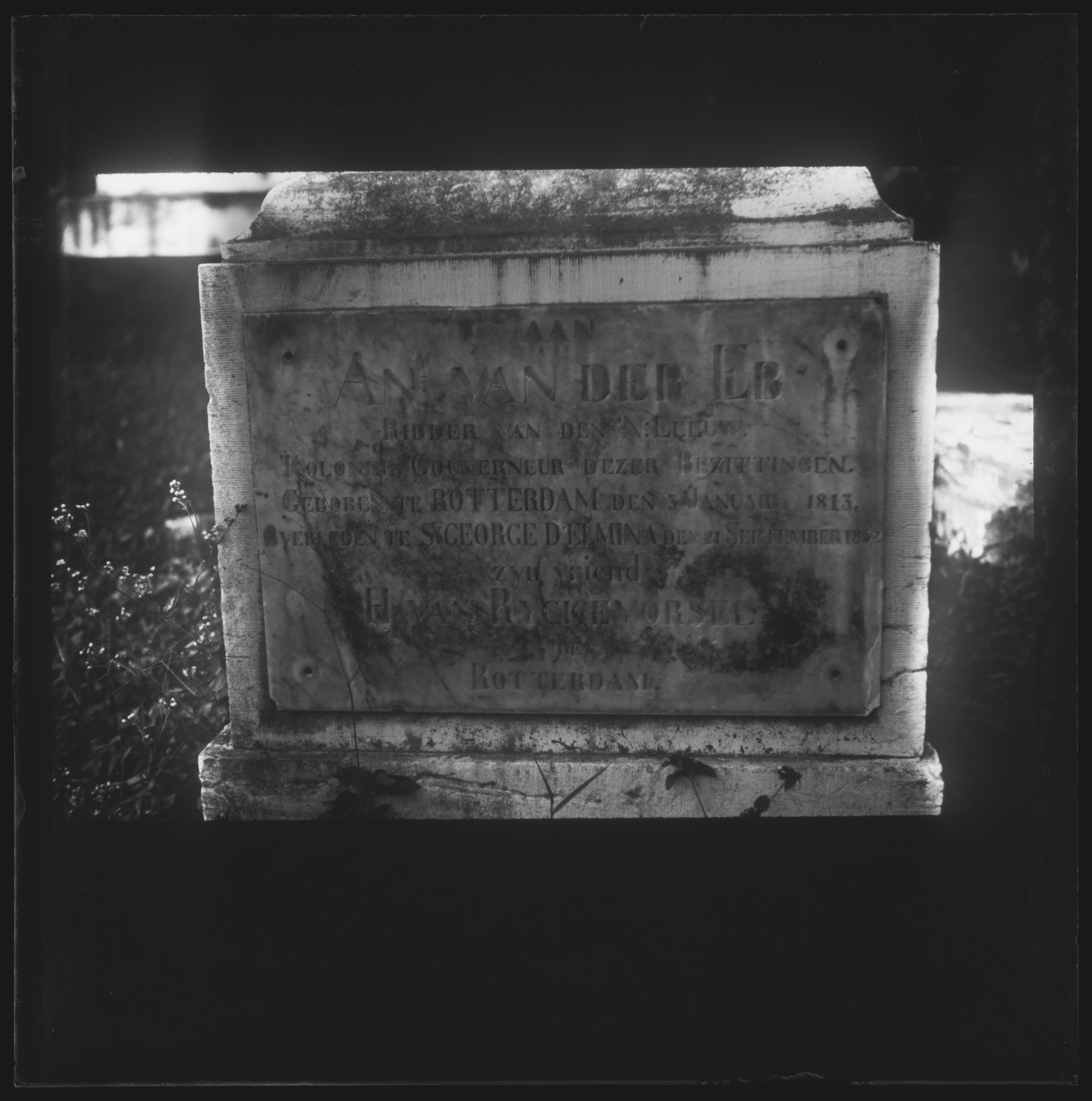
Van der Eb's gravestone in the Dutch cemetery of Elmina.

Van der Eb died in office, on 21 September 1852, in Elmina Castle. He was buried in the Dutch cemetery of Elmina.

== Personal life ==
Van der Eb married Efua Henrietta Huydecoper, daughter of Willem Huydecoper, a Euro-African civil servant for the Dutch government, who had acted as envoy of the Netherlands to the Ashanti Empire. After her death he remarried to Manza Henrietta Bartels, daughter of the prominent Euro-African merchant Carel Hendrik Bartels.

== Decorations ==
- Order of the Netherlands Lion (Knight)
- Order of the Oak Crown (Commander)
