= Hero Schomerus =

Governor of the Dutch Gold Coast
- In office 21 September 1852 – 25 September 1856
- Preceded by: Anthony van der Eb
- Succeeded by: Petrus Jacobus Runckel

Personal details
- Born: 24 August 1816 Emden, Kingdom of Hanover, German Confederation
- Died: 25 September 1856 (aged 40) Elmina, Dutch Gold Coast
- Spouse: Ellen Frij

Hero Schomerus (born 24 August 1816 – 25 September 1856) was a military and colonial administrator, who made a career in the administration on the Dutch Gold Coast.

== Biography ==
Hero Schomerus was born in Emden to Johann Gerhard Schomerus and Johanna van Laar. His father was a ship broker (Dutch: cargadoor).

Schomerus was appointed assistant in the administration of the Gold Coast by royal decree of 8 August 1845. He was promoted several times before he became governor ad interim of the Gold Coast in 1852, after governor Anthony van der Eb had died. He was appointed full governor by royal decree of 20 January 1853.

Apart from being a colonial official, Schomerus also acted as an agent for the Rotterdam-based firm H. van Rijckevorsel & Co. During his time in office, the redoubt built on the Coebergh ("Cow Hill") in Elmina in the 1820s was reconstructed and reinforced. The new fort was completed in 1843 and later named Fort Schomerus.

Schomerus died in office, on 25 September 1856.

== Personal life ==
Hero Schomerus married Ellen Frij, a "princess of Ashanti". They had three sons together.

== Sources ==
- Van Dantzig, Albert (1999). Forts and Castles of Ghana. Accra: Sedco Publishing. ISBN 9964-72-010-6.
