= The Pen-Pictures of Modern Africans and African Celebrities =

- 2004 edition
- Author: Charles Francis Hutchison
- Language: English
- Genre: Prosopography
- Publication date: c. 1929
- Publication place: Gold Coast
- Media type: Print

The Pen-Pictures of Modern Africans and African Celebrities is a prosopography or collective biography of prominent (Euro-)African families on what was then the British Gold Coast, written by the prominent Gold Coast African Charles Francis Hutchison around 1929. The document remains an important source for scientific research on the history of the colony, and was for this purpose republished in an annotated scholarly edition by Michel Doortmont of the University of Groningen in 2004.
