= Meike Bartels =

Dutch psychologist

- Born: 1973 (age 52–53)
- Education: VU University Amsterdam; Virginia Institute of Psychiatric and Behavioral Genetics
- Known for: Research on genetics of well-being
- Awards: Fuller & Scott Award from the Behavior Genetics Association (2008)
- Scientific career
- Fields: Behavior genetics Psychology
- Institutions: VU University Amsterdam
- Thesis: Behavior problems, cognition, and hormones: A longitudinal-genetic study in childhood (2003)
- Doctoral advisor: Dorret Boomsma

Meike Bartels (born 1973) is a Dutch psychologist and behavior geneticist known for her research on the genetics of happiness and subjective well-being. She is professor in "Behavior and Quantitative Genetics" at the Department of Biological Psychology at VU University Amsterdam and affiliated with the Amsterdam Public Health Institute. She also holds a University Research Chair in Genetics and Wellbeing at the Vrije Universiteit Amsterdam. In 2008, she received the Fuller & Scott Award from the Behavior Genetics Association. She is one of the principal investigators on the study finding genetic variants related to well-being
