= Wolfgang Bartels (politician, born 1903) =

German politician

Member of the Bundestag
- In office 15 October 1957 – 15 October 1961

Personal details
- Born: 13 August 1903 Münster
- Died: 13 December 1975 (aged 72) Bochum, North Rhine-Westphalia, Germany
- Party: CDU
- Children: 2
- Occupation: Lawyer

Wolfgang Bartels (13 August 1903 – 13 December 1975) was a German politician of the Christian Democratic Union (CDU) and former member of the German Bundestag.

== Life ==
From 1953 to 1956 he was deputy district chairman of the CDU in Bochum and chairman of the CDU economic committee in the city.

Bartels was a city councillor in Bochum for many years. From 1957 to 1961 he was a member of the German Bundestag.

== Literature ==
Herbst, Ludolf; Jahn, Bruno (2002). Vierhaus, Rudolf (ed.). Biographisches Handbuch der Mitglieder des Deutschen Bundestages. 1949–2002 [Biographical Handbook of the Members of the German Bundestag. 1949–2002] (in German). München: De Gruyter - De Gruyter Saur. p. 1715. ISBN 978-3-11-184511-1.
