= William Bruce-Lyle =

Ghanaian jurist and judge

Justice William Stacey Bruce-Lyle

Supreme Court Judge of Zambia
- In office 1976–1980
- Appointed by: Kenneth Kaunda

Supreme Court Judge of Ghana
- In office 1964–1966
- Appointed by: Dr. Kwame Nkrumah

High Court Judge
- In office 1961–1964
- Appointed by: Dr. Kwame Nkrumah

Personal details
- Born: 13 October 1919 Ghana
- Relations: Frederick Bruce-Lyle
- Education: Mfantsipim School
- Occupation: Judge

William Stacey Bruce-Lyle was a Ghanaian jurist, justice of the Supreme Court of Ghana and Justice of the Supreme Court of Zambia.

== Early life and education ==
Bruce-Lyle was born on 13 October 1919 in Accra. His primary education was at Government Boys' School, Accra. He had his secondary education at Mfantsipim School and left in 1937. He proceeded to London to study law at the inns of court school of law. He was called to the bar at Gray's Inn, London in 1940.

== Career ==
After secondary school, Bruce-Lyle worked as a second division clerk at Ghana Civil Service until 1946. He was appointed district magistrate in 1953, senior magistrate in 1958 and circuit judge in 1960. He was appointed judge of the high court in 1961 and he served in that capacity for three years. In 1964 he was appointed judge of the Supreme Court of Ghana and he remained in that position until 1966 when Nkrumah's government was ousted from power. He moved to Zambia where he became senior magistrate of Zambia from 1968 to 1971. He became a high court judge in Zambia from 1971 to 1976. He was appointed judge of the Zambian Supreme Court in 1976 until his retirement in 1980.

== Personal life ==
Prior to his 1951 marriage to Rosamond Alexandra Bannerman, he had a daughter Emma Lilian. With Rosamond he had two sons Leslie, Frederick and a daughter Desiree. His second son, the late His Honour Mr Justice Frederick Victor Bruce-Lyle was a jurist of the Eastern Caribbean Supreme Court based in Saint Vincent and the Grenadines and his daughter Desiree Bruce-Lyle is a jurist of San Diego Superior Court, United States.

According to an obituary for his son Frederick, William Bruce-Lyle is deceased as well.

== See also ==
- List of judges of the Supreme Court of Ghana
- Supreme Court of Ghana
