= Frederick Bruce-Lyle =

Ghanaian jurist and judge

Frederick Victor Bruce-Lyle (6 August 1953 – 21 April 2016) was a Ghanaian-born jurist who was a judge in several Caribbean countries.

Born in Accra, Ghana, Bruce-Lyle was the second son of Ghana's Supreme Court judge and Supreme Court judge of Zambia, William Bruce-Lyle, and the grandson of Sir Leslie McCarthy. He was educated at Mfantsipim School, Cape Coast, the Accra Academy and the University of Ghana, where he attained a Bachelor of Laws degree.

From 1979 to 1984, Bruce-Lyle was a State advocate in Zambia, before moving to the Caribbean where he served as a Magistrate in Belize (1984–1989); Saint Vincent and the Grenadines (1989–1993); the British Virgin Islands (1993–1997); and Antigua and Barbuda (1997–1999). He was a naturalised citizen of Saint Vincent and the Grenadines.

In 1999, Bruce-Lyle was appointed by the Judicial and Legal Services Commission of the Caribbean Community as a High Court Justice of the Eastern Caribbean Supreme Court based in Saint Vincent and the Grenadines. In 2013, Bruce-Lyle became the longest serving High Court Judge.

Bruce-Lyle died in Trinidad in 2016 after a brief illness.
