= Fort Tantumquery =

Military structure in Ghana

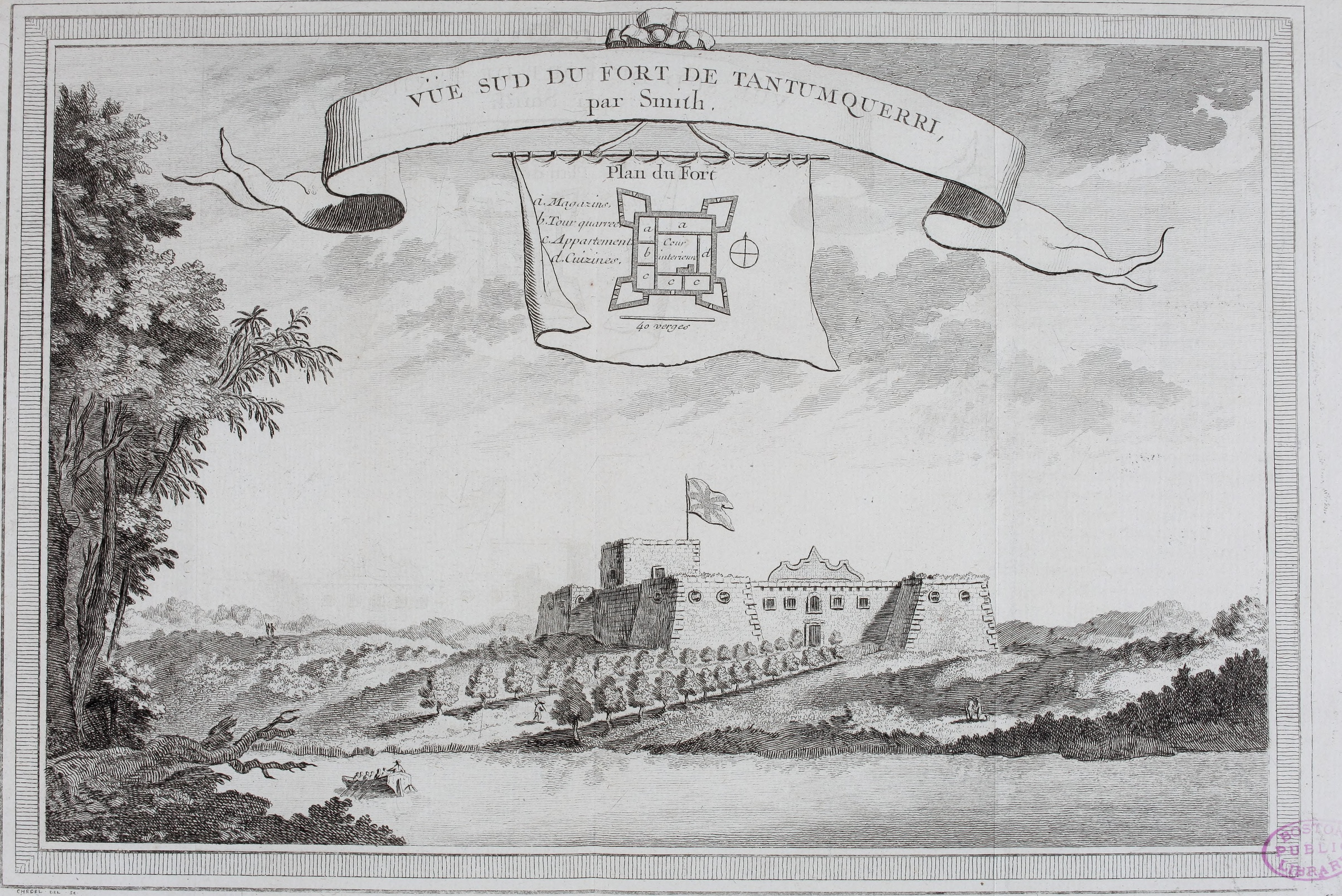
18th-century illustration of Fort Tantumquery

Fort Tantumquery is a military structure designed to facilitate the slave trade. The Royal African Company built it in the 1720s, at Otuam in the Ekumfi District, Central Region, Ghana, in what was known at the time as the Gold Coast.

In 1727 William Smith surveyed it after the RAC had appointed him to review their castles in Africa following disturbing reports that they were unprofitable. Smith described it as follows:

"The next Day, at Noon we anchor'd at Tantumquery in Nine Fathoms Water. I went ashore and finding their Tank pretty low, could get but Four Casks of Water which I sent off in our Yaul. This is a pretty litte regular Fort having Four Flankers, on which are mounted Twelve Pieces of Ordnance. It is pleasantly situated near the Sea Side. The Landing-place, indeed, is but very indifferent, I have seen Eight fishing Canoes out of Fifteen overset at their Landing here, by which unlucky accident they lost all their fish. "
