= Willem Huydecoper =

Euro-African merchant, politician and diplomat

Envoy of the Netherlands to the Ashanti Empire
- In office May 1816 – April 1817

Personal details
- Born: November 1788 Elmina, Dutch Gold Coast
- Died: 22 February 1826 (aged 37) Elmina, Dutch Gold Coast

Willem Huydecoper (November 1788 – 22 February 1826) was an important Euro-African merchant, politician, and diplomat on the Dutch Gold Coast in the late eighteenth and early nineteenth century.

== Biography ==
Willem Huydecoper was born in Elmina to Willem Pieter Cornelis Christiaan Huydecoper, son of Director-General Jan Pieter Theodoor Huydecoper, and Amba Quacoea, a Fante woman. He moved to Surinam, where he was christened on 16 March 1803.

By 1809, Willem Huydecoper was back in Elmina, where he was installed as assistant in the colonial administration on 14 December of the said year. He was promoted to first assistant with the titular rank of second lieutenant on 15 August 1815, to second resident of Fort San Sebastian at Shama on 6 October 1816, and finally to commandant of the same fort on 31 August 1819. During his tenure at Fort Sebastian, between May 1816 and April 1817, he was also installed as envoy for the Kingdom of the Netherlands at the Ashanti court at Kumasi, to renew the relationship that had become estranged during the French occupation of the Netherlands.

His upward career then took a hit, as he was demoted to assistant on 1 November 1819. He served the remainder of his career as administrator of medicines, interpreter of the English language, and master of works.

Huydecoper died in Elmina on 22 February 1826, at age 37.

== Family ==
Willem Huydecoper is the father of Jacob Huydecoper, who followed in his diplomatic footsteps to also became envoy of te Netherlands at Kumasi, and of Efua Henrietta Huydecoper, who married Governor of the Gold Coast Anthony van der Eb.
