= Thomas Hutton-Mills =

Thomas Hutton-Mills may refer to:

- Thomas Hutton-Mills Sr. (1865–1931), lawyer and politician in the Gold Coast
- Thomas Hutton-Mills Jr. (1894–1959), his son, lawyer, politician and diplomat in the Gold Coast
