= Großhennersdorf =

- Ortsteil of Herrnhut
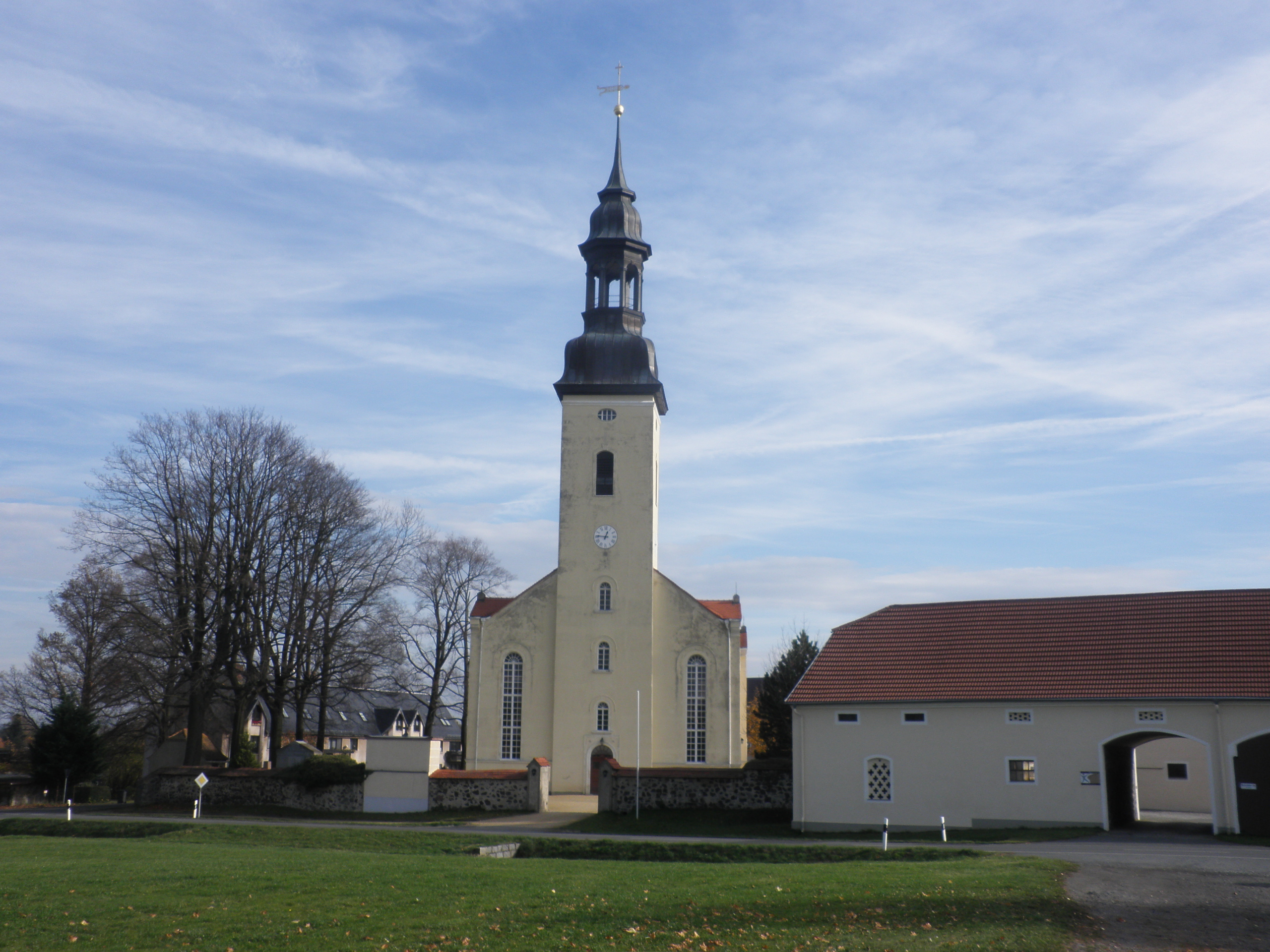

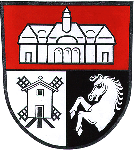
- Coat of arms
- Interactive map of Großhennersdorf
- Location within Germany Location within Saxony
- Coordinates: 50°59′27″N 14°47′36″E
- Country: Germany
- State: Saxony
- District: Görlitz
- Town: Herrnhut

Area
  - Total: 21.94 km^{2} (8.47 sq mi)
- Elevation: 341 m (1,119 ft)

Population (2009-12-31)
  - Total: 1,503
  - Density: 68.51/km^{2} (177.4/sq mi)
- Time zone: UTC+01:00 (CET)
  - Summer (DST): UTC+02:00 (CEST)
- Postal codes: 02747
- Dialling codes: 035873
- Website: www.grosshennersdorf.de

Großhennersdorf (Upper Sorbian: Wjelikohennersdorf) is a village and a former municipality in Görlitz district, Saxony, Germany. Since 1 January 2011, it is part of the town Herrnhut. The Bundesstraße 178 connects Großhennersdorf with Löbau and Zittau.

The town was founded in 1296. The town is best known perhaps as the home of Henriette Catharina von Gersdorff m.n. von Friesen, the widow of the Governor of Upper Lusatia, Nicolaus Baron von Gersdorf. The Katharinenhof school is named for her. She raised her grandson, Nicolaus Ludwig, Imperial Count von Zinzendorf und Pottendorf (1700–1760), the Renewer of the Unitas Fratrum i.e. Moravian Church, in the Castle (now in ruins) in Großhennersdorf. She was an extremely talented, well educated woman, conversant in several languages, an author and poet, with connections all over Europe.

The municipality subdivisions include Großhennersdorf, Neundorf, Schönbrunn, Euldorf and Heuscheune.
