= Cornelius Ludewich Bartels =

German military and colonial officer (died 1804)

Governor-General of the Dutch Gold Coast
- In office 8 May 1798 – 28 April 1804
- Preceded by: Gerhardus Hubertus van Hamel
- Succeeded by: Isaac de Roever

Personal details
- Born: Brunswick, Duchy of Brunswick-Lüneburg, Holy Roman Empire
- Died: 18 April 1804 Elmina, Dutch Gold Coast

Cornelius Ludewich Bartels (unknown – 18 April 1804) was a military and colonial officer of German origin employed by the Dutch West India Company. He rose through the ranks and eventually became Governor-General of the Dutch Gold Coast in 1798.

== Biography ==
Little is known about Bartels's early life, other than that he was born in Brunswick, Duchy of Brunswick-Lüneburg, to Leopold Bartels and Eleonora Zeeleger. It is known that Bartels was a sergeant in the army of Frederick III, Prince of Salm-Kyrburg, an important figure in the Patriot faction of the late 18th-century Dutch Republic, that occupied Utrecht during the Revolt of 1787. The army was disbanded after Frederick William II of Prussia invaded the Republic on behalf of the Ancien Régime, which probably led Bartels to employ himself with the Amsterdam chamber of the Dutch West India Company in 1789.

Bartels was appointed captain-commandant of the militia, first artillery officer and engineer, and junior member of the council. He was promoted to ordinary member of the council in 1796, and to commandant of Fort St. Anthony at Axim in 1798.

On 8 May 1798, Bartels was appointed "President of the Council of the Dutch Gold Coast", a title reserved for an acting Director-General, after Director-General Gerhardus Hubertus van Hamel had died. He was appointed Governor-General of the North and South Coast of Dutch Africa in 1801.

Meanwhile, the Dutch West India Company, Bartels' nominal employer, had been dissolved in 1792, with the possessions reverting to rule of the States-General of the Dutch Republic. Furthermore, by the time Bartels was appointed "President of the Council", the Dutch Republic itself had been replaced by the Batavian Republic. These revolutionary developments in Europe did not bring much changes to the government of the colony, which were governed like nothing had changed.

== Family ==
Bartels is probably best known for the Euro-African Bartels family dynasty he founded in Elmina. Bartels had a son with a local woman named Quaba:

- Izaac Nicolaas Pieter Bartels (d. 1847), who for his role in the Dutch–Ahanta War was exiled to the Dutch East Indies, where he made career in the colonial administration.

Bartels also had a son out of a relationship with half-Dutch, half-African Maria Clericq:

- Carel Hendrik Bartels (1792–1850), prince-merchant and Dutch colonial government official in Elmina, ancestor of the Bartels family dynasty on the Gold Coast.
