= Jan Pieter Theodoor Huydecoper =

Director-General of the Dutch Gold Coast
- In office 11 September 1764 – 8 June 1767
- Preceded by: Hendrick Walmbeeck
- Succeeded by: Pieter Woortman
- In office 13 March 1759 – 2 March 1760
- Preceded by: Lambert Jacob van Tets
- Succeeded by: David Pieter Erasmi

Personal details
- Born: 2 September 1728 Hellevoetsluis, Netherlands
- Died: 11 July 1767 (aged 38) Elmina, Dutch Gold Coast

Jan Pieter Theodoor Huydecoper (2 September 1728 – 11 July 1767) was an administrator of the Dutch West India Company. He served as Director-General of the Dutch Gold Coast between 1759 and 1760 (ad interim) and from 1764 until his death in 1767.

== Biography ==
Jan Pieter Theodoor Huydecoper was born in Hellevoetsluis to Adriaan Huydecoper (1693-1740), chief commissioner of the navy depot at Hellevoetsluis, the port of call of the Admiralty of the Maze, one of five constituent admiralties of the Dutch Navy, and Sara Maria van Asch van Wijk (1691-1728), who died in the year he was born. The young Huydecoper was then brought to his godparents, Pieter Theodoor van Herzeele and his wife, in Utrecht. After a scandal involving Mrs Van Herzeele, Huydecoper was taken to Amsterdam by his Aunt Sophia Huydecoper. He attended the French and Latin school in Amsterdam.

Huydecoper had a reputation for being a rake and was more occupied with women than with more serious business. After moving to Geneva in 1752, Huydecoper was so much indebted by 1756 that he decided to employ himself with the Dutch West India Company. He was installed as head merchant on the Dutch Gold Coast in August 1756.

=== Career on the Gold Coast ===
After arriving at Fort George at Elmina, Huydecoper moved to Fort Crevecoeur at Accra, where he was stationed. After the death of Director-General Lambert Jacob van Tets, Huydecoper was interim Director-General (so-called President of the Council) of the Gold Coast between March 1759 and March 1760.

Huydecoper failed to convince the West India Company's directors back in Holland to appoint him as director-general. The new director-general, David Pieter Erasmi, sent to Fort St Anthony at Axim. Despite this being a principal fort (its head being a chief merchant like in Accra), trade with the hinterland was hindered by local warfare. However, Huydecoper's prestige with the administrators of the Dutch West India Company began to rise as his reports were of higher quality than those of the other members of the Council. This created so much rivalry that after Erasmi's death in 1764, Huydecoper succeeded only just in convincing the directors back in Holland to appoint him as director-general. Between September 1764 and June 1767, Huydecoper was Director-General of the Gold Coast.

== Family ==
Huydecoper had three relationships with local women when he was stationed at the Gold Coast. In 1758 he married the Afro-European woman Penni Raems. They had two children:

- Barbara Huydecoper (1760–1761);
- Willem Pieter Cornelis Christiaan Huydecoper (1763–1799) founded the (African) Huydecoper dynasty, which would become a prominent Elmina mulatto family. He was the father of Willem Huydecoper and grandfather of Jacob Huydecoper.

Huydecoper also had a son with a local woman named Abeba:

- Cudjo Huydecoper.

Huydecoper had another son with a local woman named Johanna:

- Constantin Ferdinand Huydecoper.
