= Carel Hendrik Bartels =

Mulatto trader

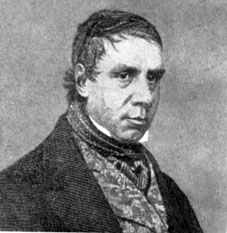
- Born: September 29, 1792; Elmina, Dutch Gold Coast
- Died: February 10, 1850 (aged 57); Elmina, Dutch Gold Coast
- Occupation(s): trader, businessman, judge
- Spouse: Adjua Ere-ëba

Carel Hendrik Bartels (29 September 1792 – 10 February 1850) was the wealthiest and most important Euro-African trader and businessman on the Dutch Gold Coast in the second quarter of the nineteenth century. Apart from his entrepreneurial activities, Bartels was also a judge and member of the colonial government in Elmina, making him one of the most important men in town.

Bartels has an entry in Hutchison's The Pen-Pictures of Modern Africans and African Celebrities. The American historian Larry W. Yarak found an engraving based on a photograph of Bartels in 1995.

== Biography ==
Carel Hendrik Bartels was born in Elmina to Cornelius Ludewich Bartels, Governor-General of the Gold Coast, and the local Euro-African Maria Clericq. Little is known about his youth, but it is known that he was sent to the Netherlands for his education. In August 1814, Bartels returned to the Gold Coast with the first ship after the defeat of Napoleon Bonaparte at the Battle of Leipzig, and acted as the official messenger of the Dutch authorities for this news.

Between 1814 and 1820, Bartels was employed in the colonial administration of the Gold Coast. From 1839 onward, Bartels acted as judge in the Court of Justice of Elmina, and was a member of the colonial council.

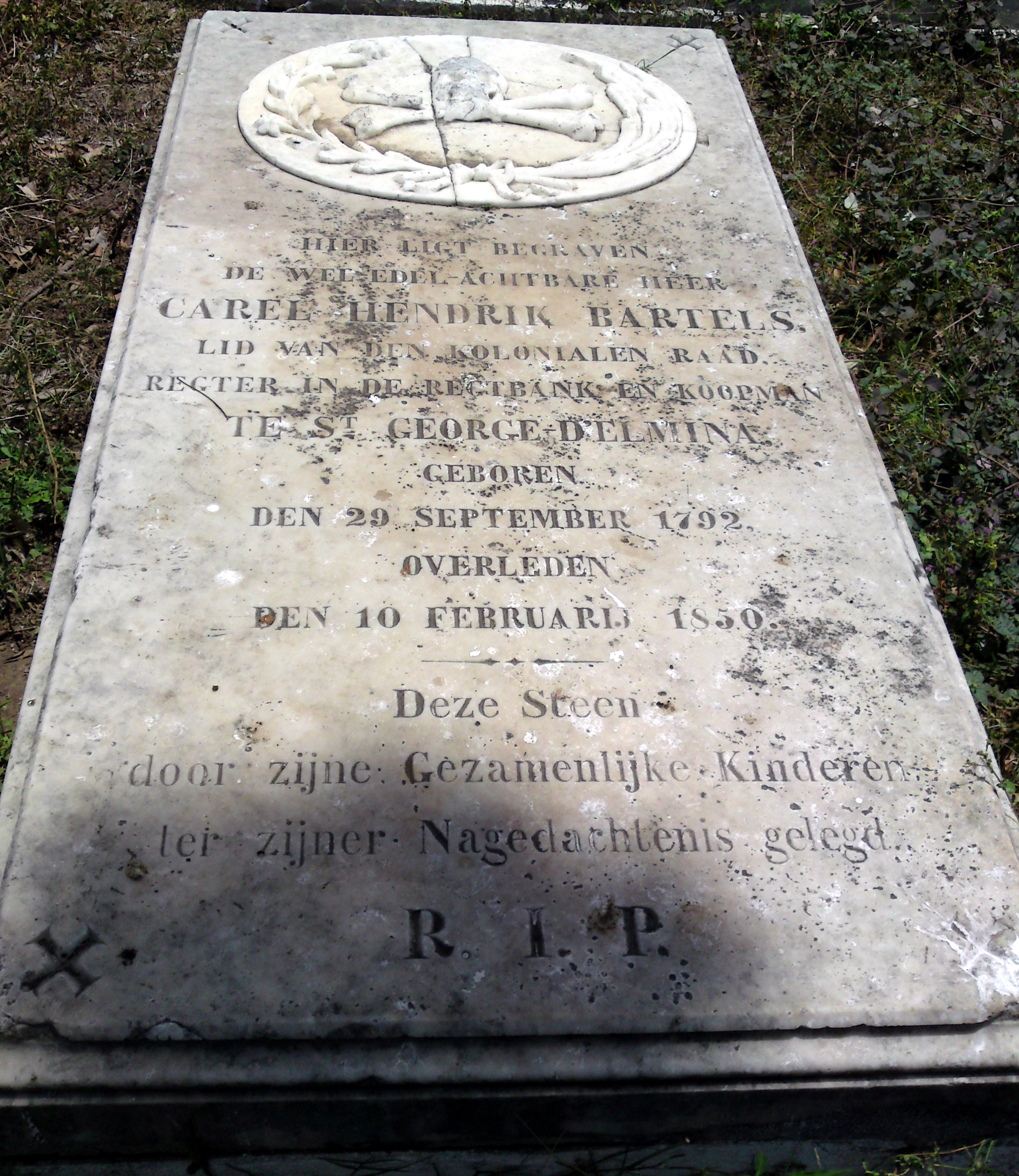
Gravestone of Carel Hendrik Bartels grave in the Dutch cemetery of Elmina.

Bartels died on 10 February 1850. He is interred in the Dutch cemetery of Elmina.

== Family ==
Bartels is the founder of the influential Euro-African Bartels family on the Gold Coast. He was married to Adjua Ere-ëba, with whom he had five daughters and a son:

- Manza Henrietta Bartels, who married Governor Anthony van der Eb
- Amba Amelia Bartels (1816–1882)
- Maria Amba Bartels (1822–1863), who married master of works and stores Hubertus Varlet
- Willem Bartels (1823–1844)
- Jacoba Araba Bartels (1824–1848), who married Governor Willem George Frederik Derx
- Anna Esson Bartels (1829–1907)

Bartels also had a son out of an extra-marital affair with Catharina Rühle, also Euro-African:

- Louis Bartels (1818–1857)

Lastly, Bartels had four children with Amba Praba:

- Charlotte Bartels (1817–1873), who married Commander Martinus Swarte
- Carel Bartels (1818–1890)
- Christina Bartels (1826–1854), who married Governor Hendrik Doijer
- Jacob Bartels (1830–1872), great-grandfather of Francis Lodowic Bartels
