= List of Dutch West India Company trading posts and settlements =

This is a list of the trading posts and settlements of the Dutch West India Company (active 1621–1791), including chronological details of possessions taken over from the Dutch state in 1621, and for the period after 1791 when the Dutch government took over responsibility again.

The list runs in geographical sequence from north to south along the West African coast and from north to south through the Americas.

== West Africa ==
=== Mauritania ===
- Arguin (1633–1678 / 1724–1728)
- Portendick

=== Senegal ===
- Portudal
- Rufisque
- Joal
- Gorée(Dutch: Goeree island' (1617–1663 / 24 October 1664 – 1677))

=== Sierra Leone ===
- Tasso Island (1664; destroyed by Admiral De Ruyter)

=== Liberia ===
- Cape Mount

=== Ghana (Dutch Gold Coast) ===
1611–1872

- Cape Apollonia (Benyin): Fort Apollonia (16.-1768 / 1868–1872) to the English.
- Abacqua (Duma or Egwira): Fort Ruychaver (Jul./Aug. 1654 – 1659)
- Mouth of Ankobra: Fort Elize Carthago (1650)
- Axim: Fort Santo Antonio (February 1642 – 1664 / 1665 – 1872)
- Pokesu or Princess Town (old Dutch spelling: Poquesoe): Fort Hollandia (formerly fort Gross Friedrichsburg) 1725 fort - 1814/1815 abandoned/1687* - 1698/1711 – 1712/1732 - 1804 abandoned
- Dixcove: Fort Metalen Kruis (1868–1872)
- Butri: Fort Batenstein (1656-1665 / 166..–1872)
- Takoradi: Fort Witsen
- British Sekondi: 1782–1785; 1868–1872.
- Dutch Sekondi: Fort Oranje, 1640 or 1670/75–1872.
- Shama: Fort St. Sebastiaan 1637-1664 / 1664–1872
- British Komenda: Fort Komenda (1868–1872)
- Dutch Komenda: Fort Vredenburgh (1688 fort – 1782 / 1785–1872)
- Elmina: Castle St. George d'Elmina, Fort Coenraadsburg on St. Jago Hill, Redoubt De Veer (1810/1811), Redoubt Naglas (1828), Redoubt Java (1828), Redoubt Schomarus (1828), Redoubt Batenstein (1828). (28/29 August 1637 – 6 April 1872)
- Cape Coast Castle, Cabo Corço or Oguaa (Swedish name: Carolusborg or Carlsborg) (16 April 1659.- May 1659/ 22 April 1663. - 3 May 1664 **Cong (Cong Height): - 1659 abandoned / 1661 Danish Fort destroyed by the Dutch)
- Moree: Fort Nassau (1624) (1598 or 1611 / 12 – 1664/1665 – 1782/1785 – 1867 by treaty to the English)
- Cormantin: Fort Amsterdam (1665–1721 / 1785–1867 by treaty to the English)
- Anomabu: (1640–1652)
- Egya: (1647– ? / 1663–1664)
- Apam: Fort Leydsaemheyt or Lijdzaamheid (Patience) (1697/16981782/ 1785–1868)
- Senya Beraku: Fort Goede Hoop, (1667 or 1705/06 – 1782/1785 – 1867/68)
- Ussher Town (Accra): Fort Crèvecœur (1649–1782/ 1786–1868)
- Kpone: (1697 - Apr. 1700 / 1706– ?)
- Keta: Fort Singelenburgh (? - 1737)
- Kumase: (1837–1842 / 1848–1853 / 1859–1869)

=== Togo ===
- Petit Popo or Popo / (Anecho or Aneho) (1731–1760)

=== Benin (Dutch Slave Coast) ===
- Great Popo(1680– ?)
- Ouidah (1670s. or 1687 / 1702-1724 or 1726)
- Jaquim or Jakri (Godomey) Fort Zelandia (1726–1734)
- Offra (1675–1691)
- Appa (1732–1736)
- Savi
- Allada or Ardra

=== Nigeria ===
- Benin (1705–1736)
- Badagri (1737–1748)
- Epe (1732–1755)

== West Central Africa ==
=== Equatorial Guinea ===
- Annobón: 1641–164?/ 1665–16.. (to Portugal)

=== São Tomé ===
- 18 October 1599 – 20 October 1599 / 3 October 1641 – 16 October 1641, nowadays São Tomé and Príncipe

=== Congo ===
- Loango (Boary) (1648/ –1686/ 1721–1726)
- Ngoyo or G'oy

=== Angola ===
26 August 1641.- 21/24 August 1648.,

- São Paulo de Luanda (Luanda): Fort Aardenburgh (26 August 1641 – 21/24 August 1648) to Portugal.
- São Filipe de Benguela (Benguela): (Sept. 1641 – 1648) to Portugal
- Pinda or Mpinda (Sonyo):-at the mouth of the Congo River (1648) to Portugal
- Ensandeira island:(at the mouth of the Kwanza river) Fort Mols (1645/6–1648) to Portugal
- Malemba (Cabinda)

== Americas ==
=== North America ===
Settlements of the New Netherland colony, now in the present day U.S. states of:

- New York
- Connecticut
- Pennsylvania
- New Jersey
- Virginia

=== Caribbean ===
- St. Maarten
- Curaçao
- St. Eustatius
- Saba
- Bonaire
- Aves Island
- Las Aves
- Tobago
- St. Croix
- Tortuga
- Aruba
- Anguilla
- Tortola c.a.
- Jost van Dyke c.a.
- Virgin Gorda c.a.
- Marie Galante (May 1676)
- Grenada (1675)

=== South America ===
==== Brazil (Dutch Brazil) ====
- Maranhão
- Ceará
- Rio Grande do Norte
- Paraíba
- Itamaracá
- Pernambuco
- Alagoas
- Fernando de Noronha
- Bahia

==== Guyana ====
- Berbice
- Demerara
- Essequibo (colony)

==== Guyane ====
- Cayenne
- Approuague
- Oyapoque

==== Suriname ====
- Paramaribo
- Sommelsdijk
- Jodensavanne
