= Jan Simon Gerardus Gramberg =

Dutch author and colonialist (1823–1888)

- Born: 19 April 1823; Maastricht, Netherlands
- Died: 12 October 1888 (aged 65); Cobden, Illinois, United States
- Spouse: Neeltje Maria Anna Jonckers

Jan Simon Gerardus Gramberg (19 April 1823 – 12 October 1888) was a Dutch writer, military medical doctor, plantation owner and adventurer, who lived and worked in the Dutch Gold Coast and the Dutch East Indies, and who wrote several works about these places.

== Biography ==
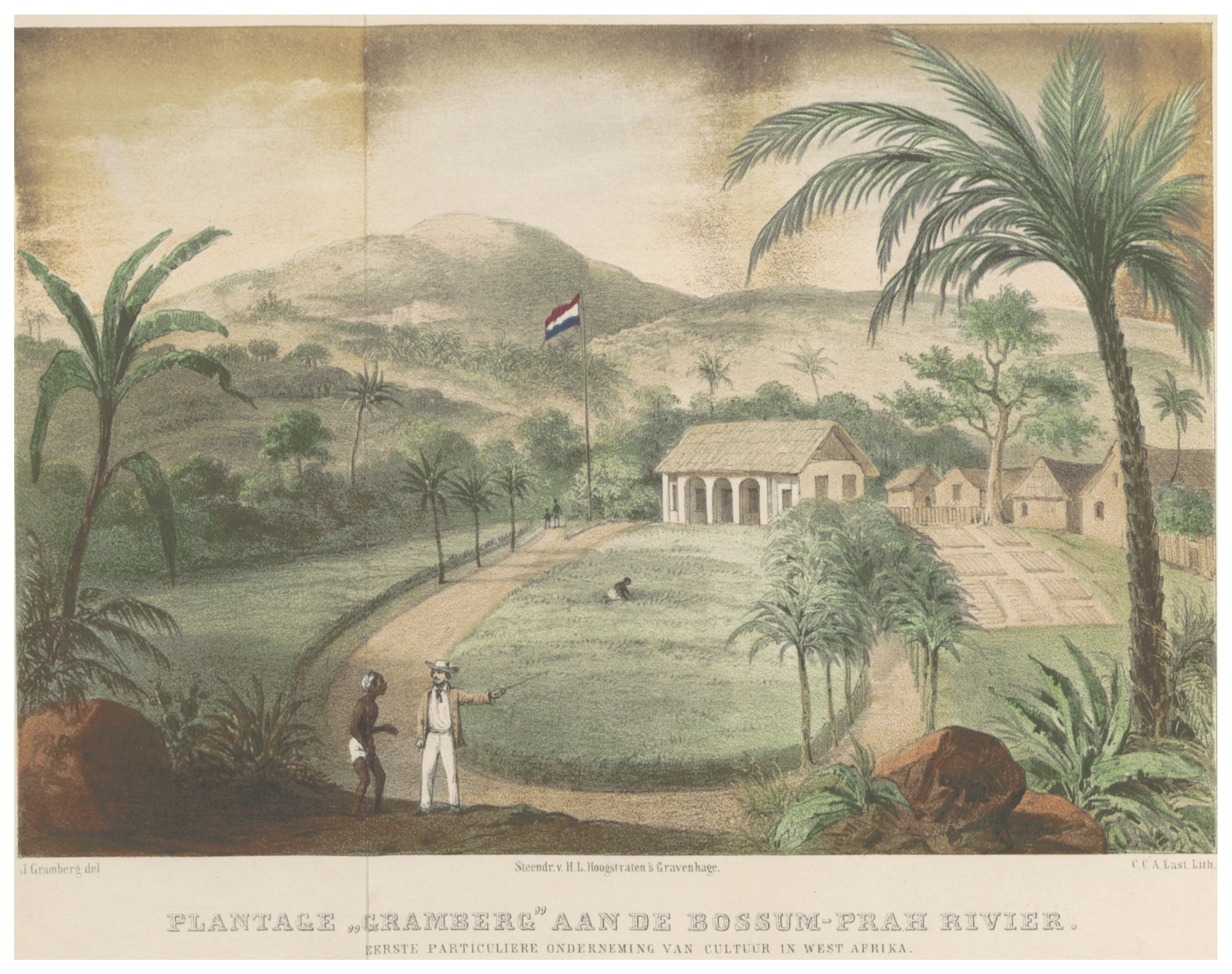
Gramberg's plantation on the Pra River.

Gramberg was born in Maastricht to Johan Gramberg and Adriana Grond. After graduating with a medical degree in Utrecht, Gramberg was installed as a medical officer on the Dutch Gold Coast by royal decree dated 13 November 1855. In Africa, he proved himself to be quite an adventurous man, travelling along the coast and the interior and eventually founding a cotton plantation on the Pra River, on the road to British Komenda. About his period in Africa, which lasted from 1856 to 1859, he wrote a best-selling book titled Schetsen van Afrika's Westkust.

Gramberg was then installed a medical officer with the Royal Netherlands Navy in the Dutch East Indies, until he had to retire from military service in late 1861 due to illness. Between early 1862 and May 1863, Gramberg was an editor of the Java-Bode, a newspaper in the Dutch East Indies.

Gramberg then shifted his career to the colonial administration, becoming a clerk in Palembang in 1863. Between July 1867 and September 1869, he was granted leave to Europe due to illness, which he spent mostly in The Hague. On returning to the East Indies, he became secretary and treasurer in Timor. He was fired in 1872 for "dishonourable conduct", but reinstalled on his old salary as secretary in the residency of Sumatra's east coast.

In 1878, Gramberg was honourably discharged from service, and settled again in The Hague. He did not find his peace there, and enlisted as a ship's doctor in the United States. He died in Cobden, Illinois on 12 October 1888.

== Publications ==
- Gramberg, Jan Simon Gerardus (1861). Schetsen van Afrika's Westkust. Amsterdam: Weijtingh & Brave. Archived from the original on 23 February 2017.
- Gramberg, Jan Simon Gerardus (1865). De inlijving van het landschap Pasoemah. Batavia.
- Gramberg, Jan Simon Gerardus (1868). Madjapahit: Historisch-romantisch tafereel uit de geschiedenis van Java. The Hague.
- Gramberg, J.S.G. (1868). "De Goudkust". De Gids. 32: 383–407.
- Gramberg, Jan Simon Gerardus (1869). De sleutel van Madjapahit. Het Mohammedanisme tegenover de westersche beschaving in Indië. Palembang.
- Gramberg, Jan Simon Gerardus (1878). Palembang, Historisch-romantisch tafereel uit de geschiedenis van Sumatra. Batavia.
- Gramberg, Jan Simon Gerardus (1882). Indische schetsen met zwart krijt. No. 1. Atjeh. The Hague.
