= Barent Eriksz =

Dutch trader

Barent Eriksz (also known as Barent Erickzen and Bernard Ericks) was a Dutch trader from Medemblik, who is considered the initiator of Dutch trade with the Gold Coast in Africa.

Eriksz departed from Medemblik in 1590, and wanted to sail to Brazil via Hamburg and North Africa, but around the equator he was held up for three months due to unfavourable winds, which eventually made him visit the island of Príncipe to repair his ship. Here he was arrested by the Portuguese, who kept him imprisoned on São Tomé. It is here that he heard of the trading opportunities in Elmina on the Gold Coast.

It is unknown how Eriksz escaped from captivity, but around 1593 he was back in the Netherlands, only to make another trading trip to the Gold Coast in the same year, coming back successfully in March 1594. Eriksz remained active in the trade on the Gold Coast, and made 11 trips in total to the area.
