= Fort São Sebastião de Xama =

Fort in Ghana

Fort São Sebastião
- Part of Dutch Gold Coast
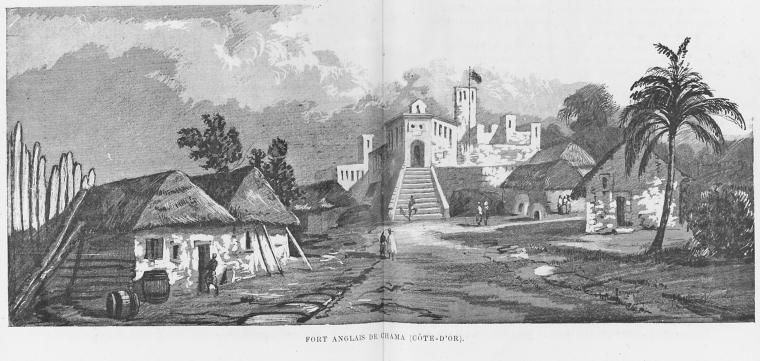
- Fort San Sebastian in 1890.

Location
- Coordinates: 5.010825°N 1.629199°W

Site history
- Built: 1523

Garrison information
- Occupants: Portugal (1523-1642); Netherlands (1642-1872)

Fort São Sebastião or Fort San Sebastian (Portuguese: Forte São Sebastião de Xama) located in Shama, Ghana, is the third oldest fortification in Ghana and it was built in 1523. Along with several other castles in Ghana, it was inscribed on the UNESCO World Heritage List in 1979 because of its testimony to the history of European trade, colonization, and exploitation in the region.

== History ==
It was built by the Portuguese from 1520 to 1526 as a trading post in and captured by the Dutch West India Company in 1642. The original purpose of the fort was to serve as a deterrent to English sailors interfering in Shama trade. The first black European university professor, Anton Wilhelm Amo, lies interred in the fort's graveyard. The fort was ceded with the entire Dutch Gold Coast to Britain in 1872.

During the time of the African Slave Trade, kidnapped Africans were imprisoned here while awaiting transport to North America.

== 3D documentation with terrestrial laser scanning ==
The Zamani Project documented Fort San Sebastian in 2013, with terrestrial 3D laser scanning. The data generated by the non-profit research group creates a permanent record that can be used for research, education, restoration, and conservation.

A 3D model and a panorama tour, of Fort San Sebastian are available on www.zamaniproject.org. An animation of the 3D model is available here.

== Gallery ==
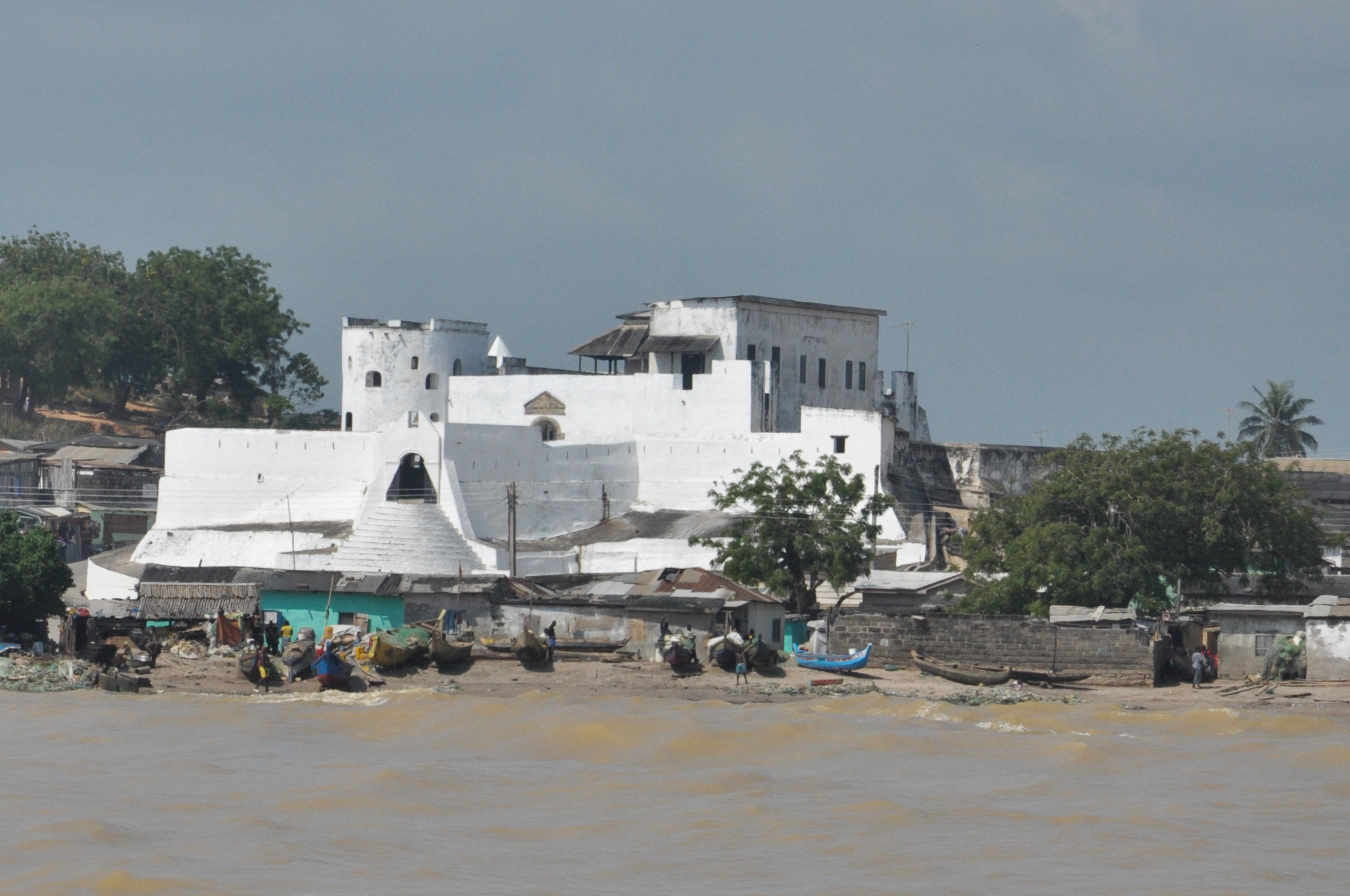
Fort St Sebastian - close up

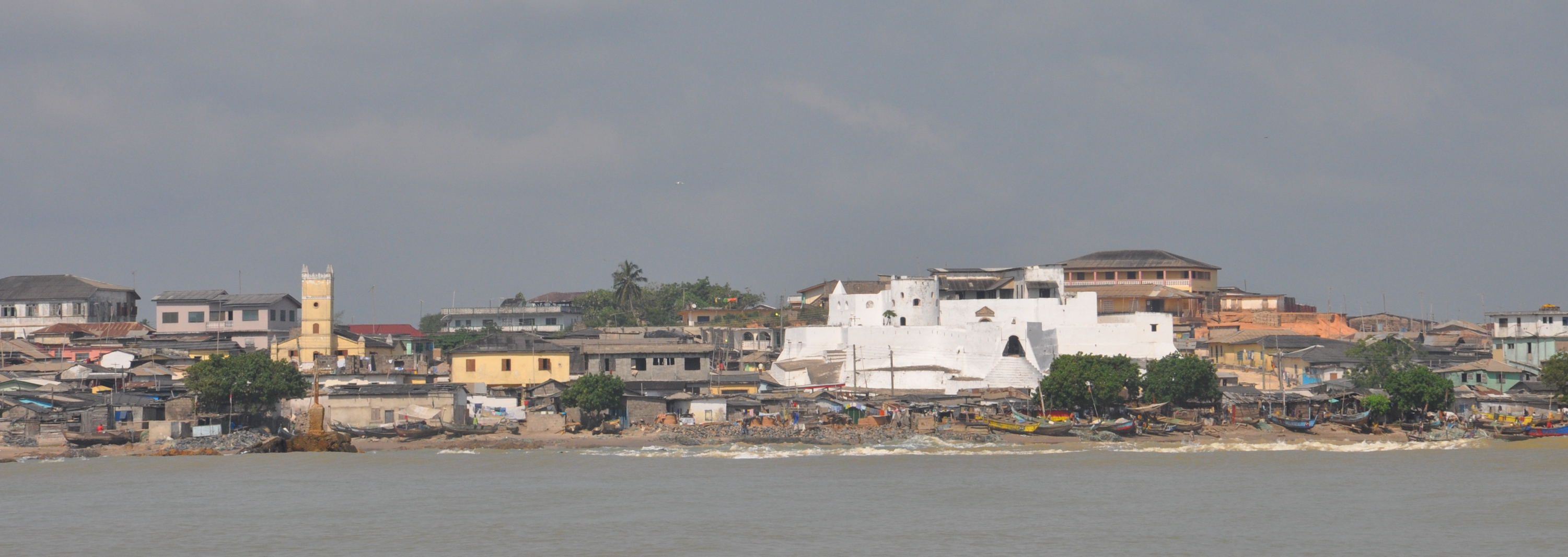
View of the fort from a boat

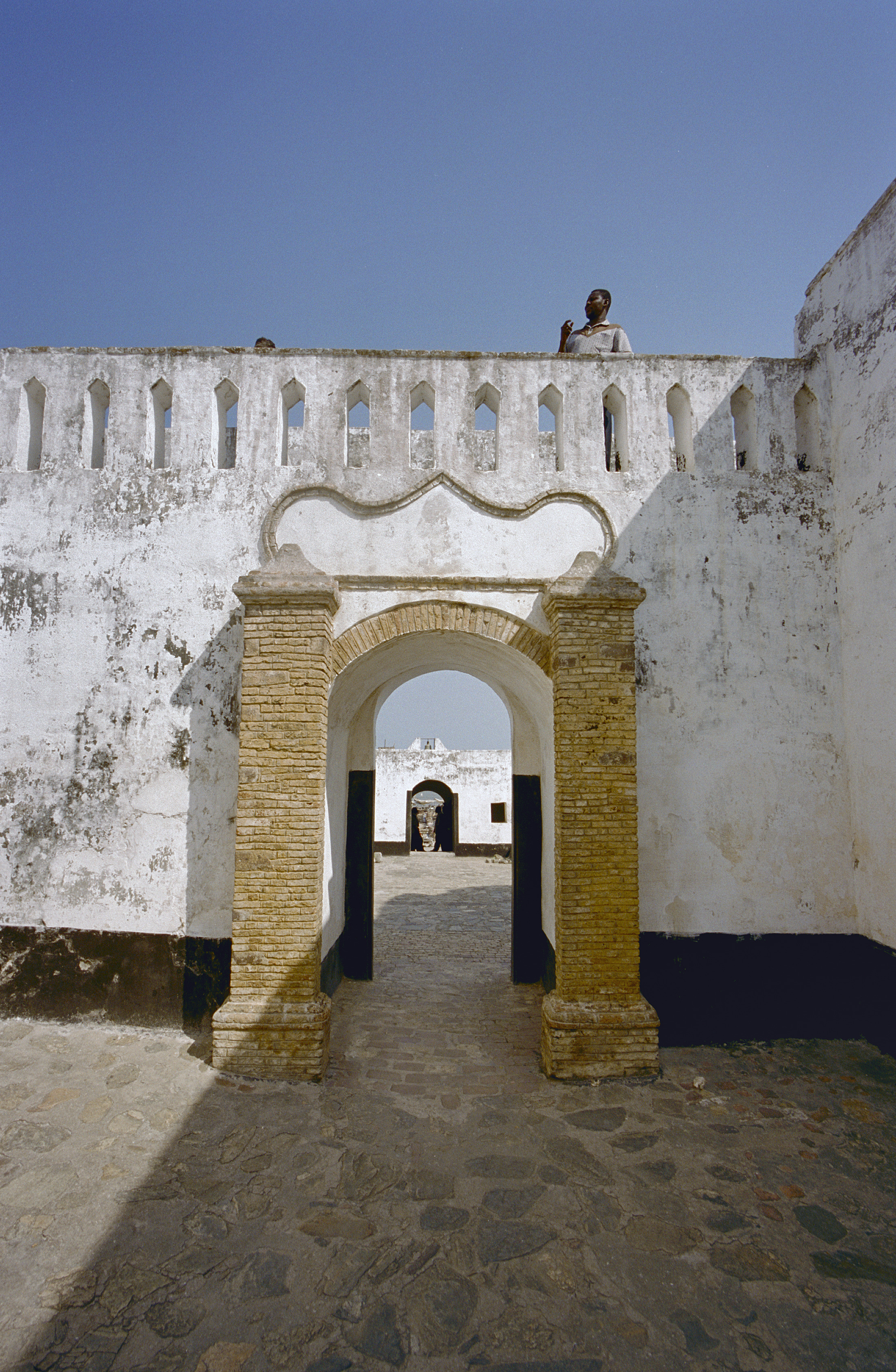
View from the gate to the front part of the fort, in the back the main gate with stairs to Shama

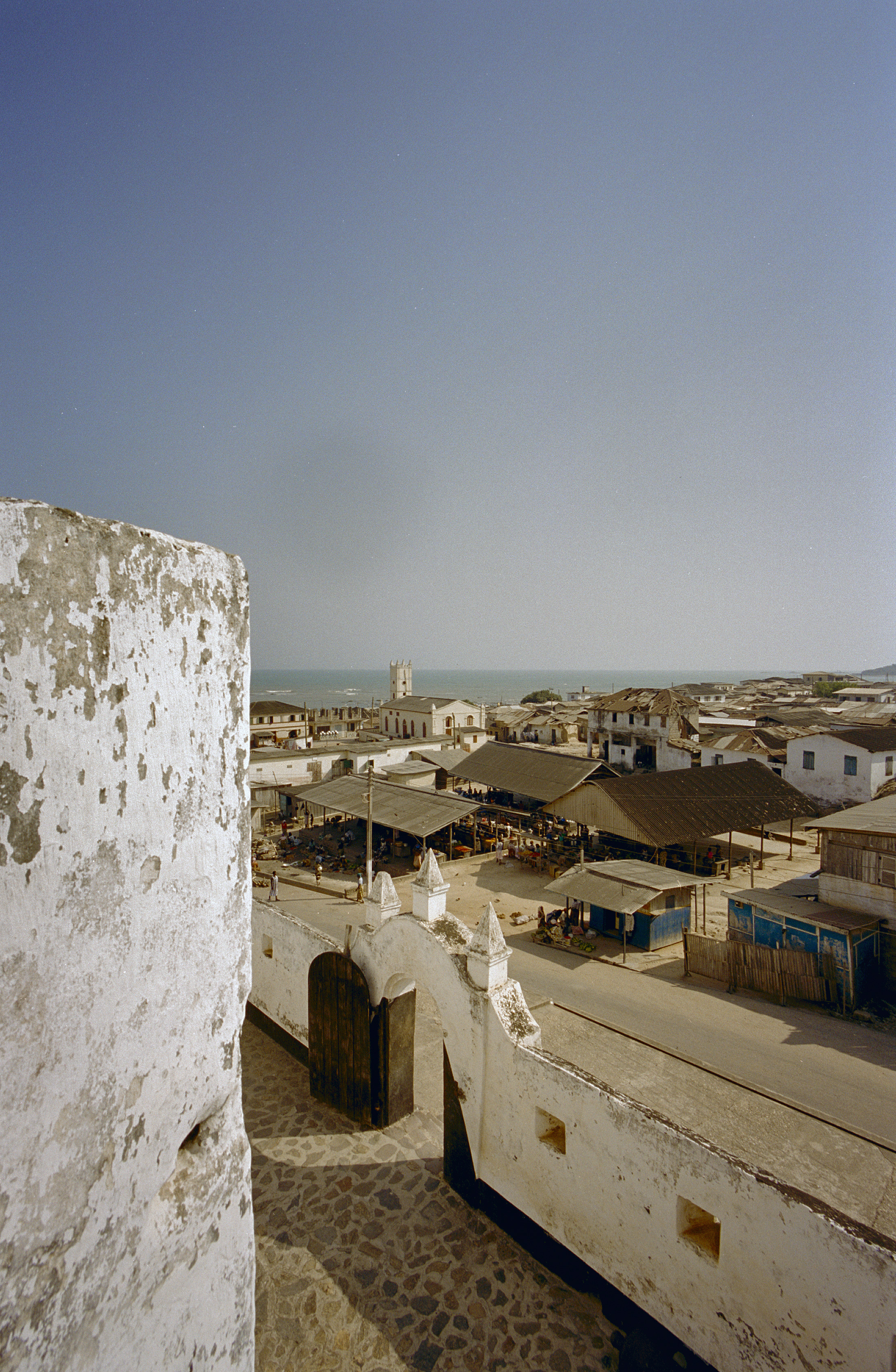
View of Shama from the fort

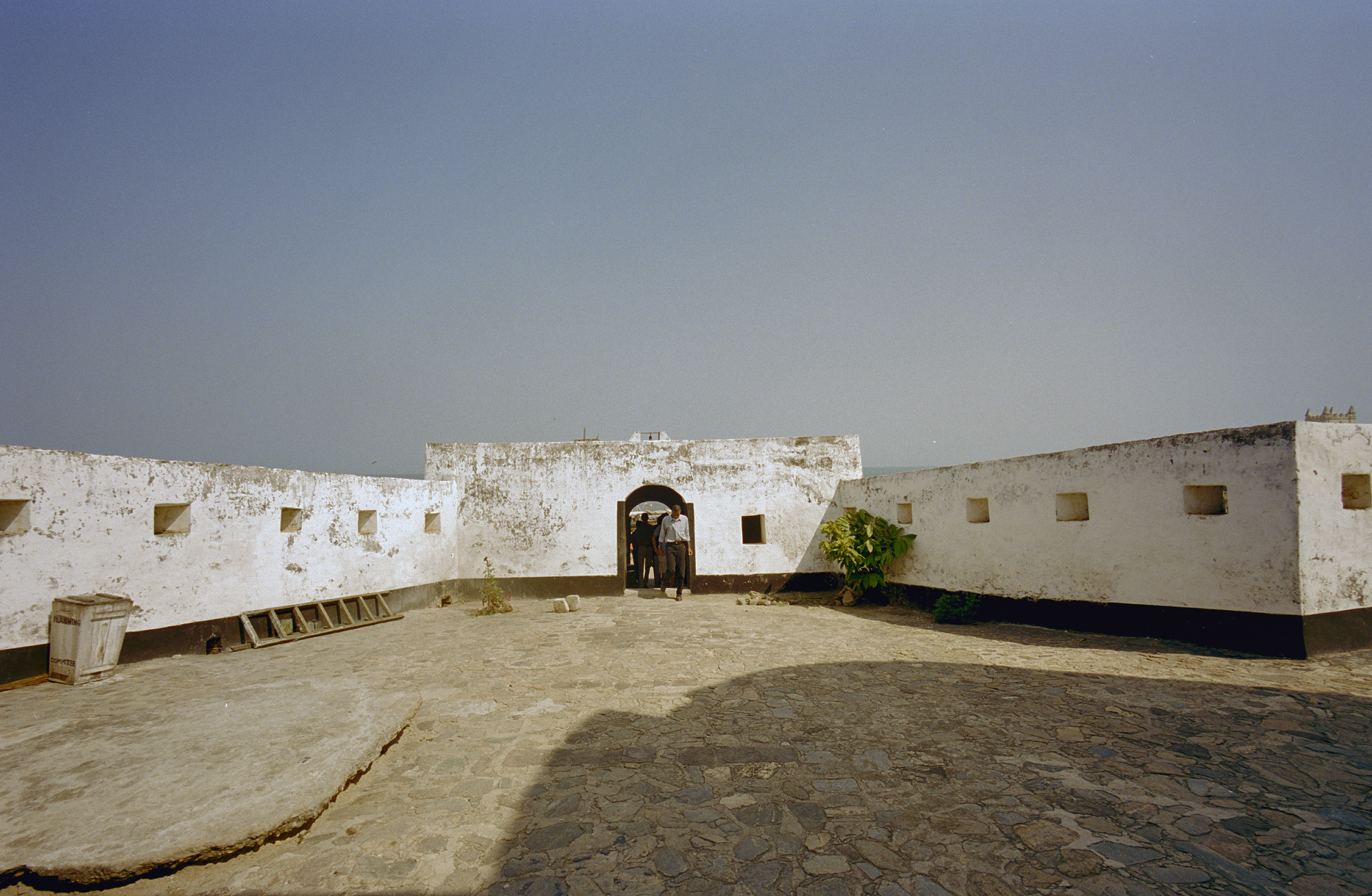
The front part of the fort

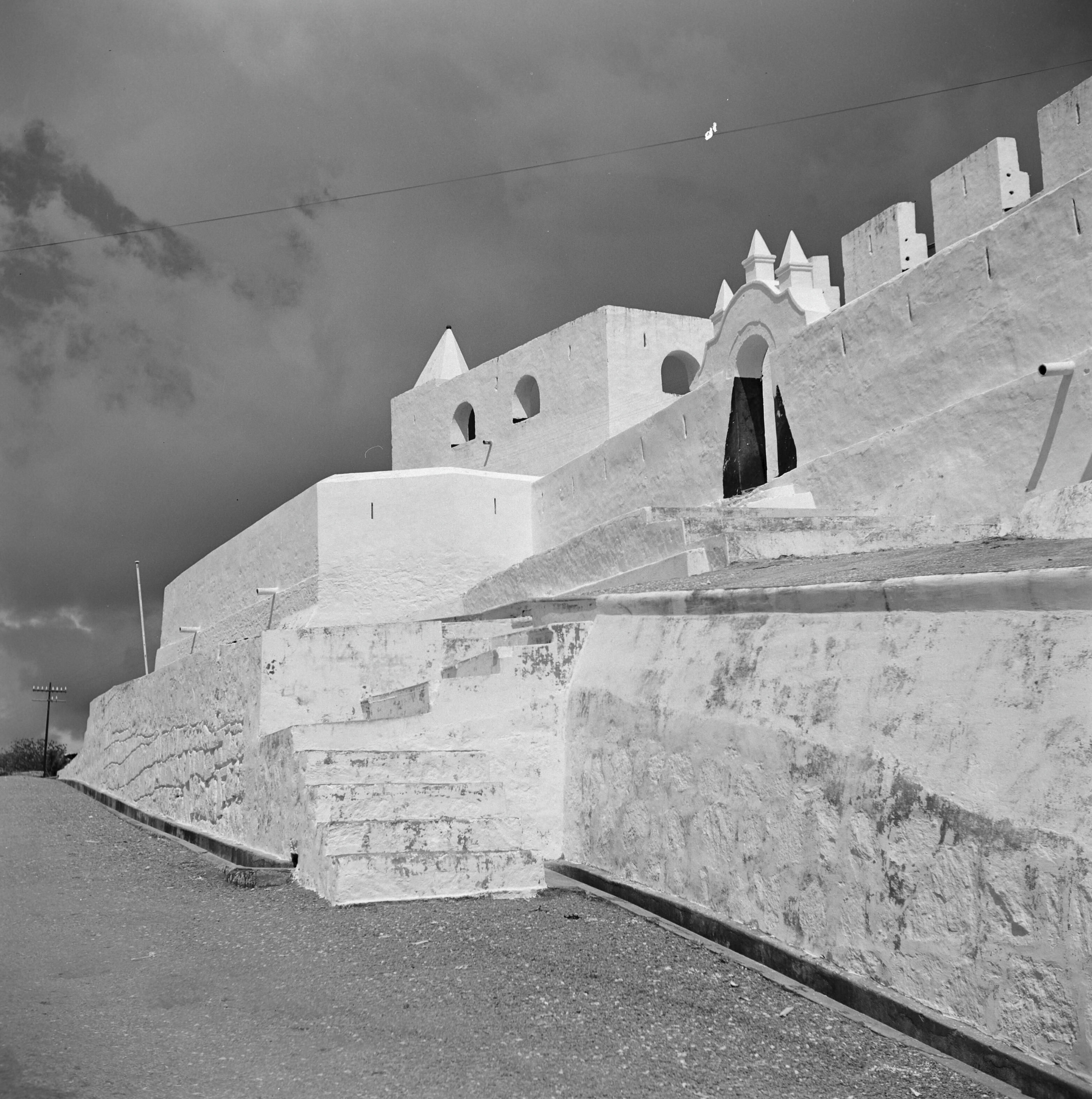
Fort St Sebastian - Shama, Ghana

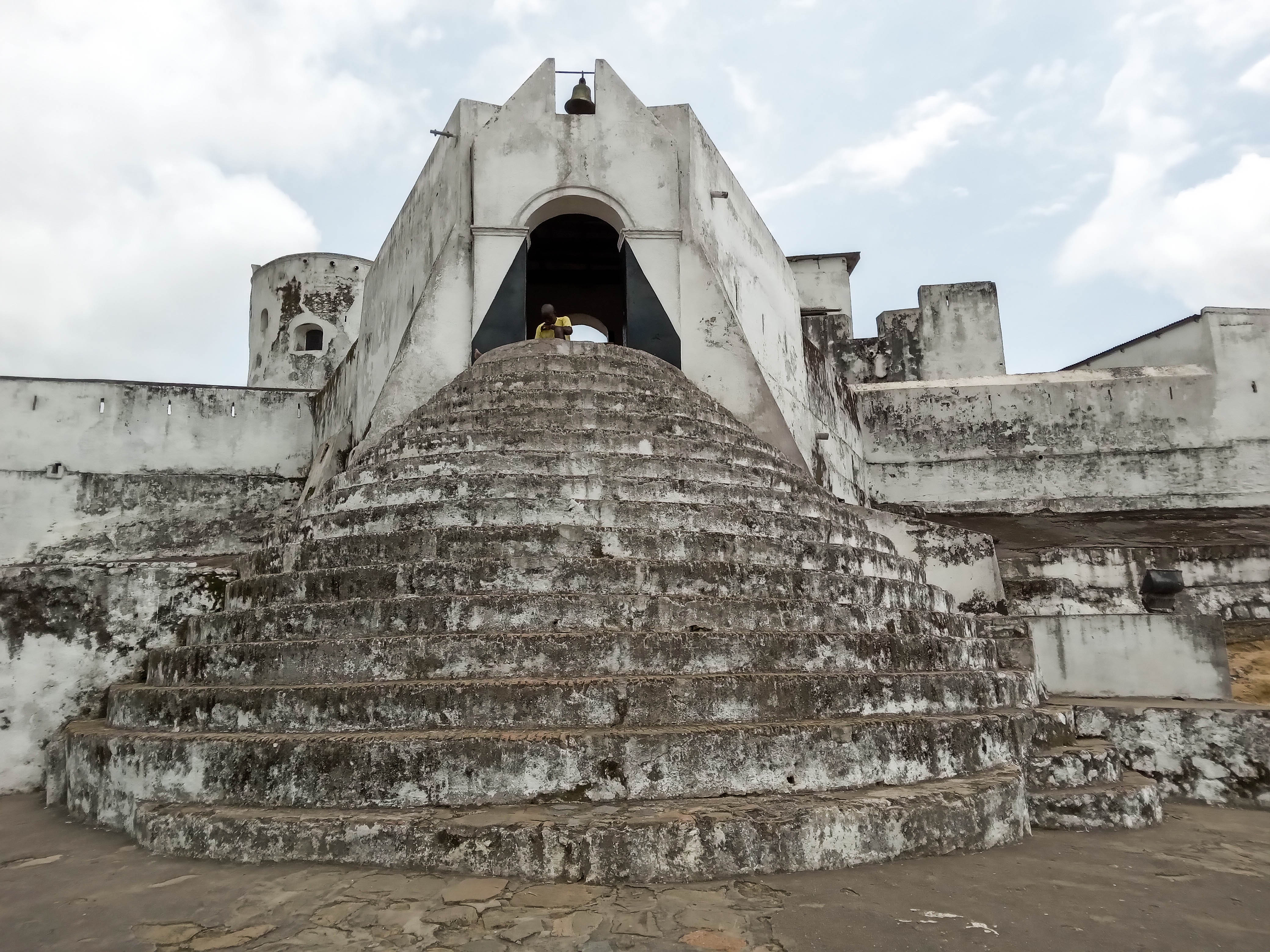
Fort St Sebastian - Shama, Ghana

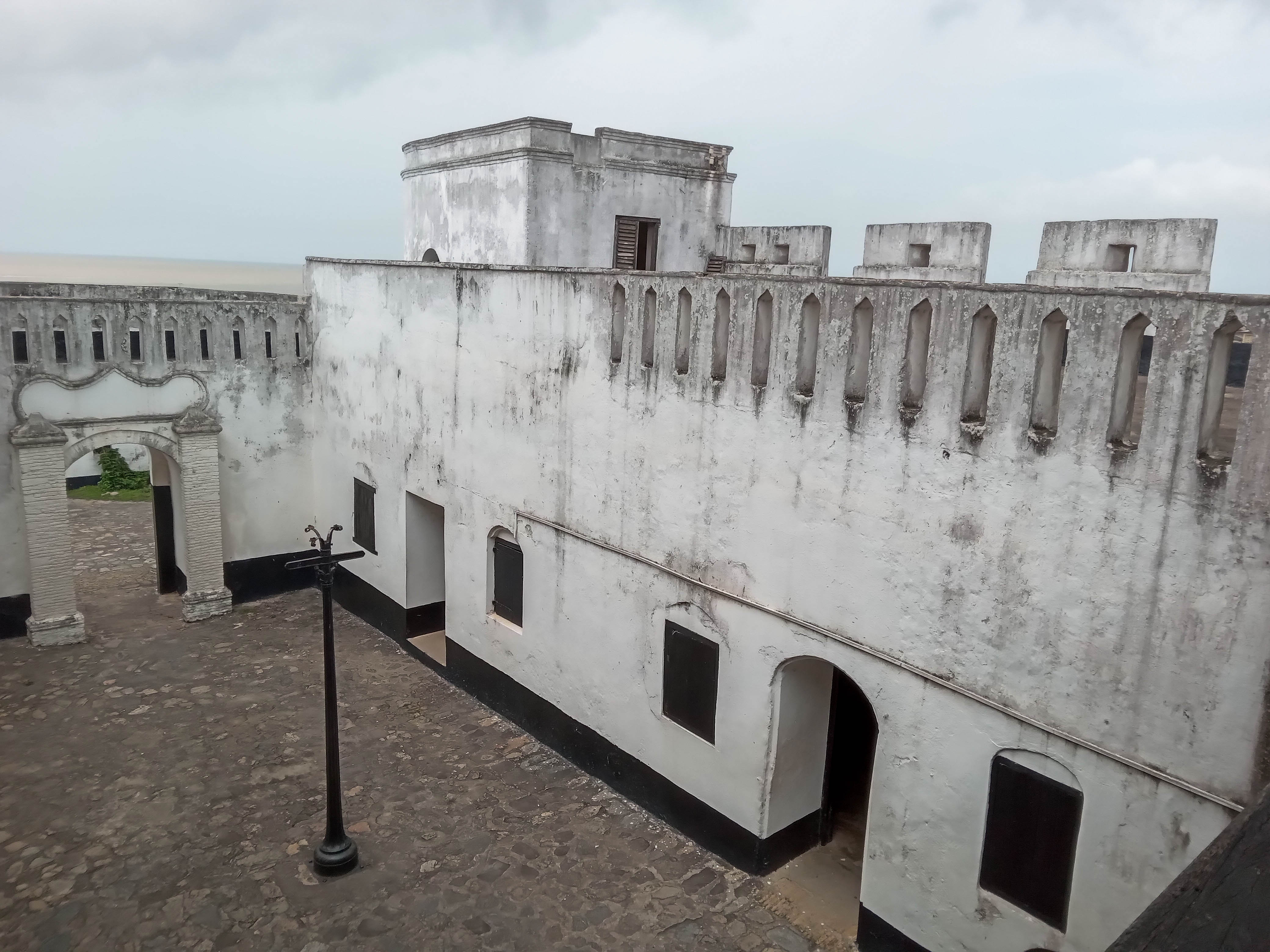
Fort St Sebastian - Shama, Ghana

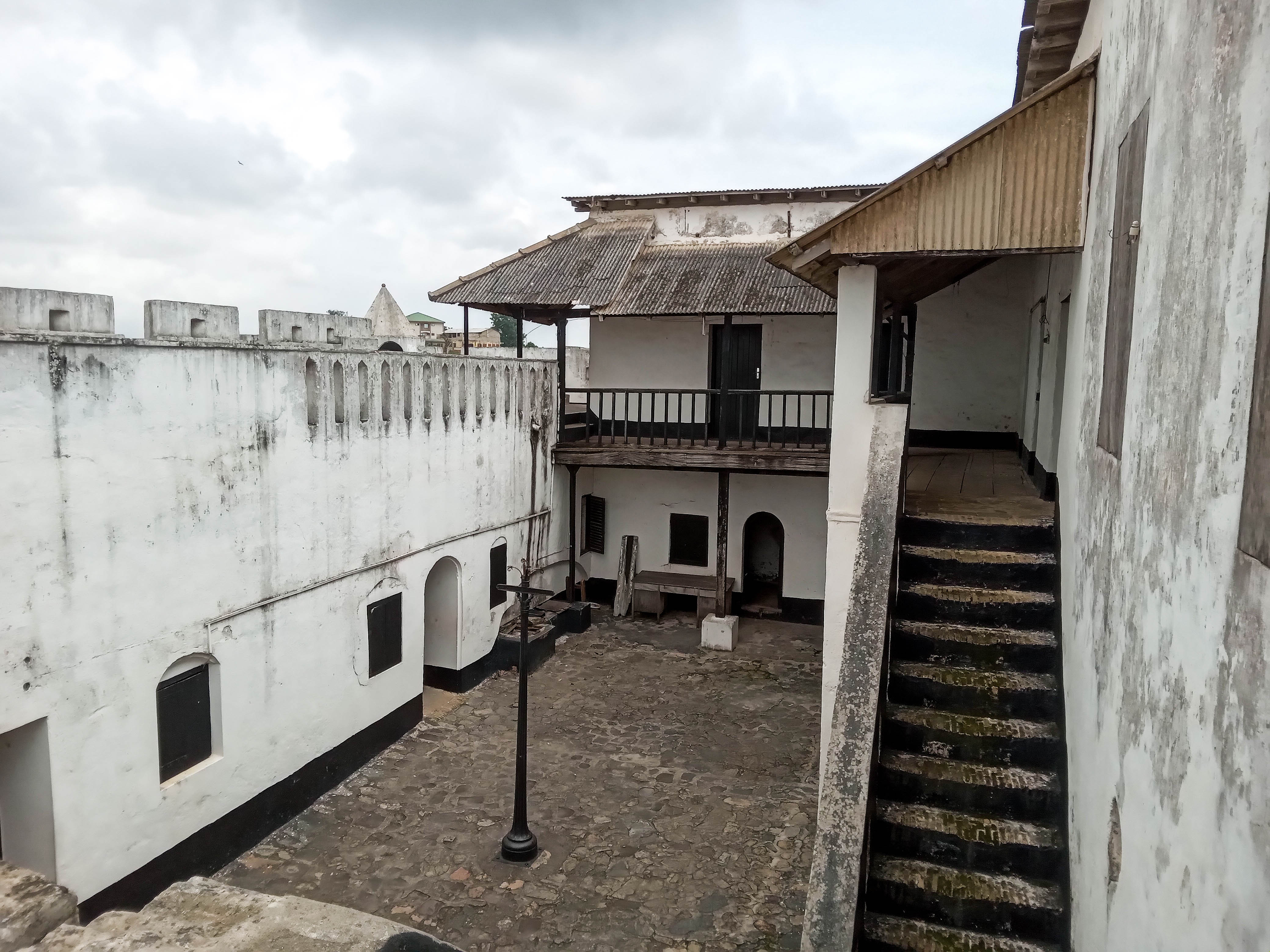
Fort St Sebastian - Shama, Ghana

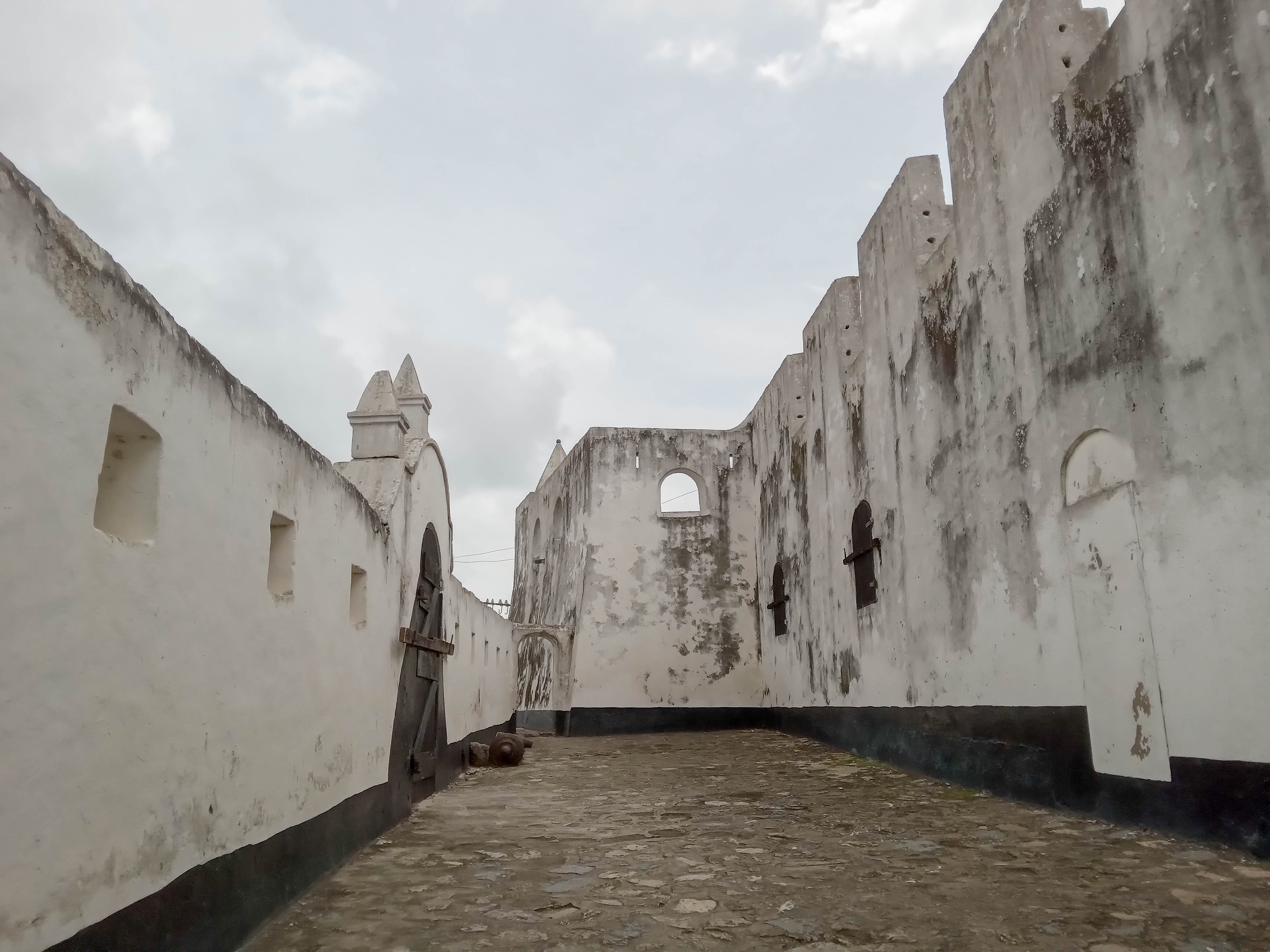
Fort St Sebastian - Shama, Ghana
