= Fort Ruychaver =

Dutch trading post in the Gold Coast

Map with the possible locations of Fort Ruychaver.

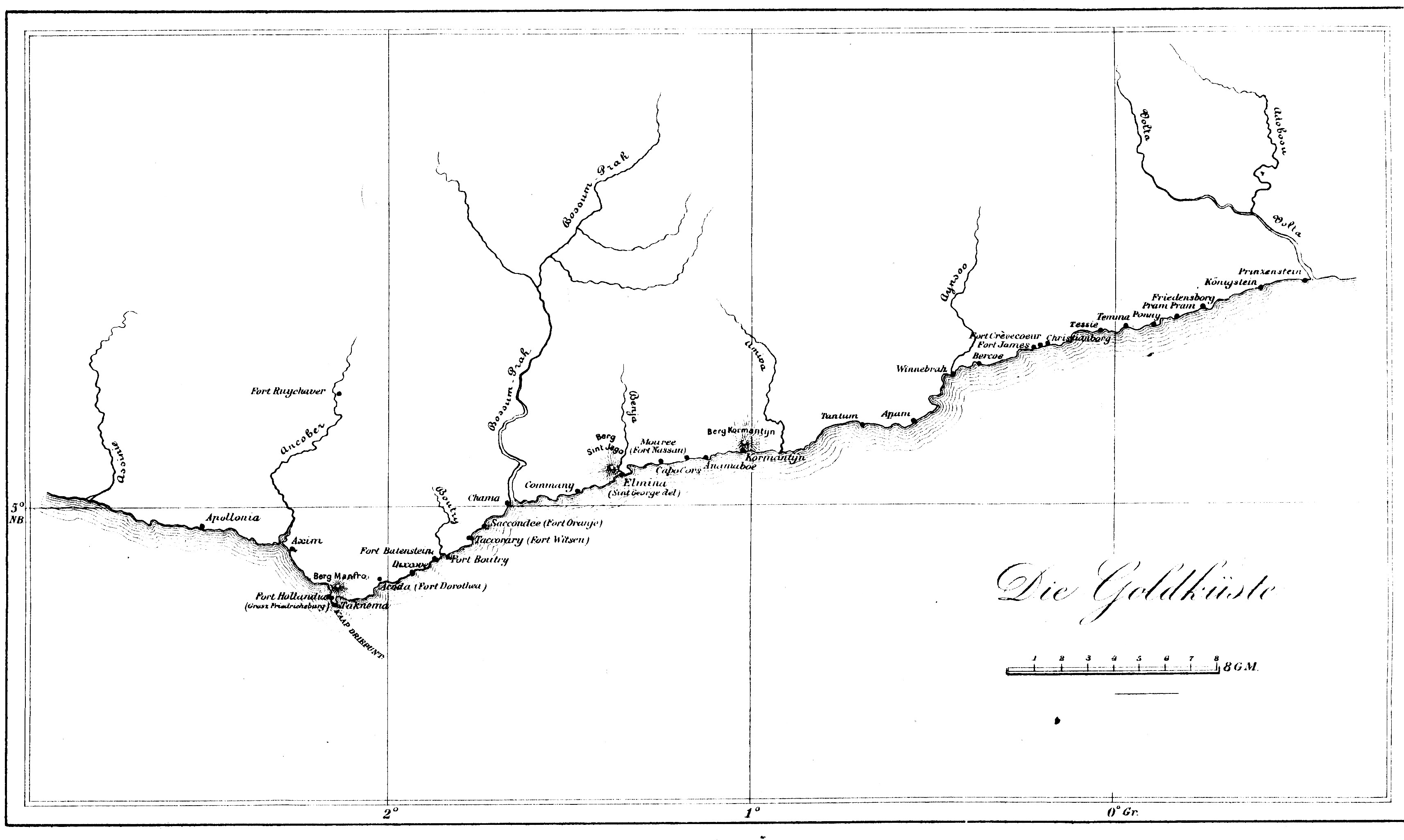
Doorman's map of settlements on the Dutch Gold Coast.

Fort Ruychaver, also Fort Ruijghaver, was a Dutch trading post in the hinterland of the Gold Coast, in contemporary Ghana. It existed between 1654 and 1660 on the banks of River Ankobra. The name of the post goes back to Jacob Ruijghaver, the director of the Dutch West India Company's possessions on the Gold Coast, who ordered its establishment.

The aim of the trading post was to enhance the trade in gold, as the area surrounding the fort was locally renowned for its gold mines. The classification of the trading post as a fort is a product of modern literature. The trading post was probably not as reinforced as the term "fort" implies, and likely consisted of a simple lodge and a few smaller huts.

== Location ==
In the literature, two possible locations for the fort are given. The map shows both these locations.

One possibility is that Fort Ruychaver was situated on the right bank of the Ankobra River, opposite the Bonsa River, in the Egwira Region. Doorman, among others, was of this school.

The other theory, primarily advocated by Daaku, takes a diary entry of Director-General Valckenburg as the point of departure. The entry says that the trading post was situated 30 miles from the coast. As one Amsterdam mile equals 5,754.53 metre, that would mean the fort's location is 173 kilometres inland. At this distance ("as the crow flies") indeed a settlement called Sanaya is situated, where according to Daaku once stood Fort Ruychaver.

At both locations, exhausted gold fields exist, that were also centres of gold production in pre-colonial times. It seems rather unlikely, however, that the Dutch travelled through vast gold fields in order to establish a fort 173 kilometres inland.

== History ==
The history of the trading post was as dramatic as it was short-lived. The Dutch succeeded in controlling the area around Fort Santo Antonio at Axim from 1642 onward, especially after signing the Treaty of Axim with the local State of Axim on 17 February of the said year. With Axim as their base, the Dutch endeavoured to spread their influence further inland, so as to gain better access to the gold field there.

This effort was not always very successful, not the least because of resistance of the native population. French competition in the Egwira region gold trade made the Dutch decide in 1654 to capture the French trading posts and settlements, which included a trading post near the future Fort Ruychaver.

The natives certainly did not appreciate Dutch presence in their homeland too much, but at the same time welcomed the possibilities of trade with a European power. The Dutch tried to cement the uneasy peace that existed at that moment by sending African salt merchants from Axim to the fort to do the trade with the local Egwira.

The peace did not last for long. In 1659, Dutch officers in Axim noted that the transport and communication routes to the fort were blocked, and in early 1660, the message arrived that the fort was destroyed by the local population, with the Axim merchants driven out. The Dutch effort to control the gold trade inland had failed.

The Dutch only renewed their effort in the late 1830s, at that time attempting to establish a gold mine of their own.
