= Dutch Gold Coast =

Dutch possession in Western Africa between 1598 and 1872

Dutch possessions on the Coast of Guinea Nederlandse Bezittingen ter Kuste van Guinea (Dutch)
- 1612–1872
- Flag Coat of arms

- Map of the Dutch possessions on the Coast of Guinea in 1859
- Status: Colony of the Dutch West India Company (WIC)
- Capital: Fort Nassau (1612–1637); Fort Elmina (1637–1872)
- Common languages: Dutch
- Religion: Dutch Reformed
- Governor
  - 1624–1638: Adriaan Jacobs
  - 1656–1659: Jan Valckenburgh
  - 1764–1767: Jan Pieter Theodoor Huydecoper
  - 1816–1818: Herman Willem Daendels
  - 1869–1871: Cornelis Nagtglas
- History
  - Established: 1612
  - Ceded: 6 April 1872
- Currency: Dutch guilder
Preceded by
| Portuguese Gold Coast |
| Brandenburger Gold Coast |
| Swedish Gold Coast |
| Ashanti Empire |
Succeeded by
| Gold Coast (British colony) |
- Today part of: Ghana

The Dutch Gold Coast or Dutch Guinea, officially Dutch possessions on the Coast of Guinea (Dutch: Nederlandse Bezittingen ter Kuste van Guinea), was a portion of contemporary Ghana known as the Gold Coast (Dutch: Goudkust), that from 1612 was gradually colonised by the Dutch West India Company (WIC) from the Dutch and Batavian Republics (present-day Kingdom of the Netherlands). The Dutch began trading in the area around 1598, joining the Portuguese which had a trading post there since the late 15th century. Eventually, the Dutch Gold Coast became the most important Dutch colony in West Africa after Fort Elmina was captured from the Portuguese in 1637, but fell into disarray after the abolition of the slave trade in the early 19th century. On 6 April 1872, the Dutch Gold Coast was, in accordance with the Anglo-Dutch Treaties of 1870–71, ceded to the United Kingdom.

== History ==
=== The Dutch settle on the Gold Coast ===
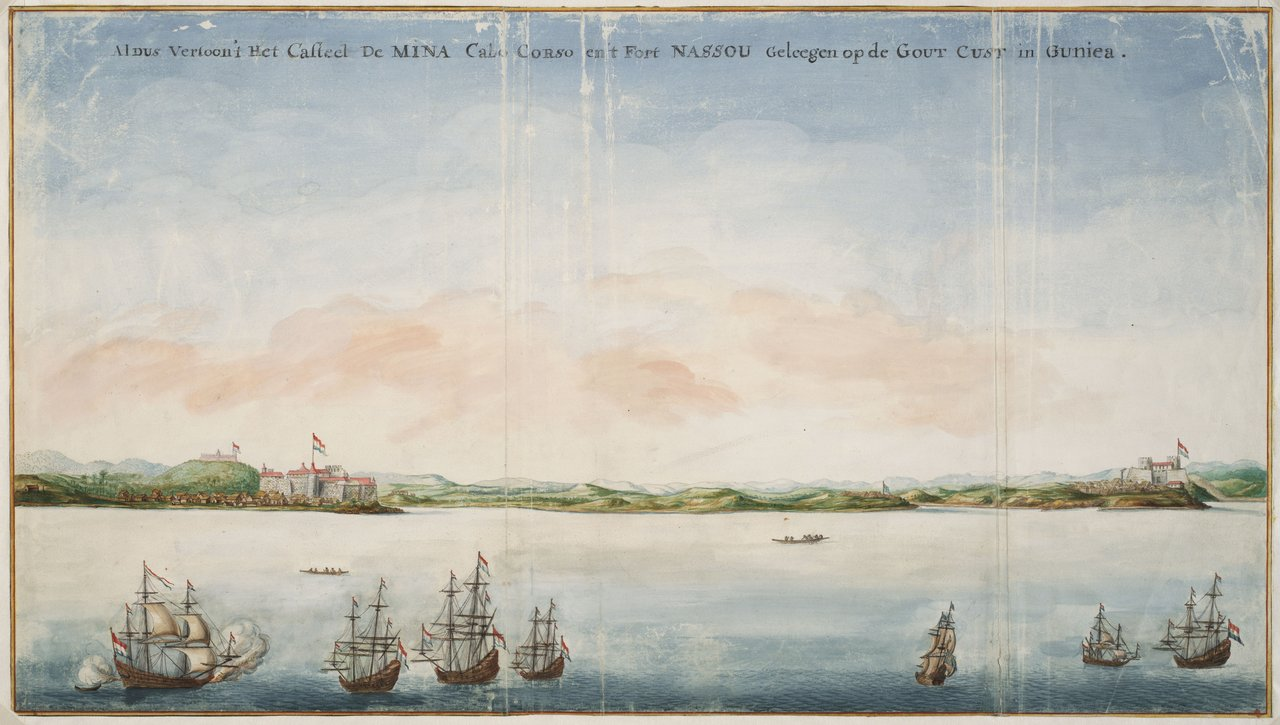
Painting by Johannes Vingboons of both Fort St. George at Elmina and Fort Nassau at Moree

The Portuguese were the first Europeans to arrive in contemporary Ghana. By 1471, they had reached the area that was to become known as the Gold Coast because it was an important source of gold. The Portuguese trading interests in gold, ivory and pepper so increased that in 1482 the Portuguese built their first permanent trading post on the western coast of present-day Ghana. This fortress, a trade castle called São Jorge da Mina ('Fort St. George [of the Mine]'), was constructed to protect Portuguese trade from European competitors.

The Portuguese position on the Gold Coast, known as Portuguese Gold Coast, remained secure for over a century. During that time, Lisbon sought to monopolise all trade in the region in royal hands, though appointed officials at Fort St. George, and used force to prevent English, French and Dutch efforts to trade on the coast. After Barent Eriksz successfully sailed to the Gold Coast in 1591, Dutch merchants began trading in the area. Pieter de Marees's publications greatly increased the interest of merchants in the region.

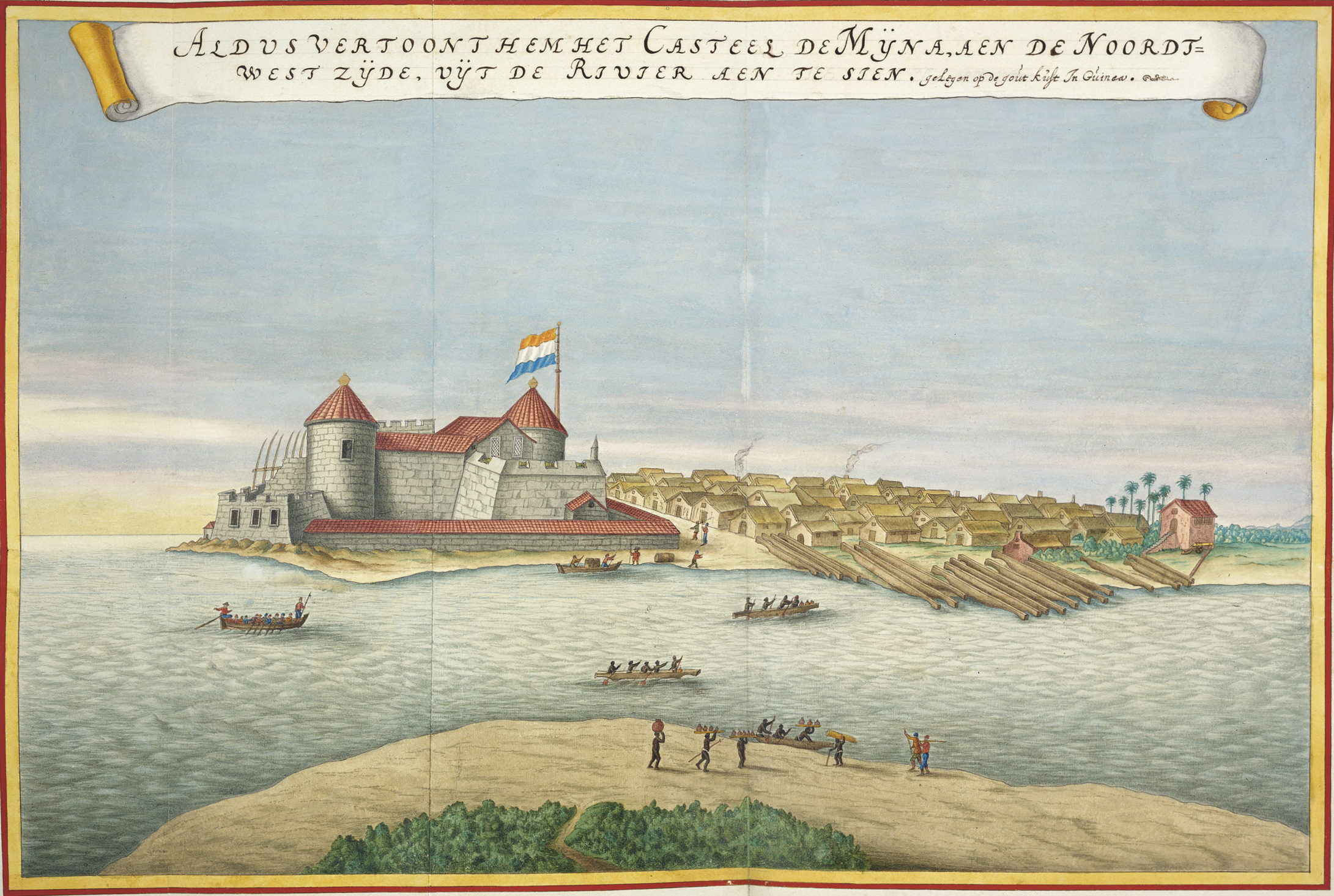
Elmina Castle in the Blaeu-van der Hem Atlas (1660s)

The Twelve Years' Truce between Portugal-Spain and the Dutch Republic, which lasted from 1609 to 1621, disrupted Dutch trade on the Gold Coast, as the Portuguese now had sufficient resources to protect their trade monopoly. Dutch traders then petitioned the States-General of the Dutch Republic to build a fort on the coast. The States-General were receptive of their demands, and sent Jacob Clantius, who was to become the first General on the Coast, to the Gold Coast in 1611. In 1612, after gaining permission of the local rulers through the Treaty of Asebu, he built Fort Nassau near Moree, on the site of an original Dutch trading post that had been burned down by the Portuguese.

After the Twelve Years's Truce ended in 1621, the Dutch West India Company (WIC) was established, which tried to seize the Portuguese colonies in Africa and America as part of the Groot Desseyn plan. After failing in 1625, the company managed to capture Elmina Castle from the Portuguese in 1637. Fort San Sebastian at Shama and Fort Santo Antonio at Axim followed in 1640 and 1642 respectively.

=== Competition with other European powers ===
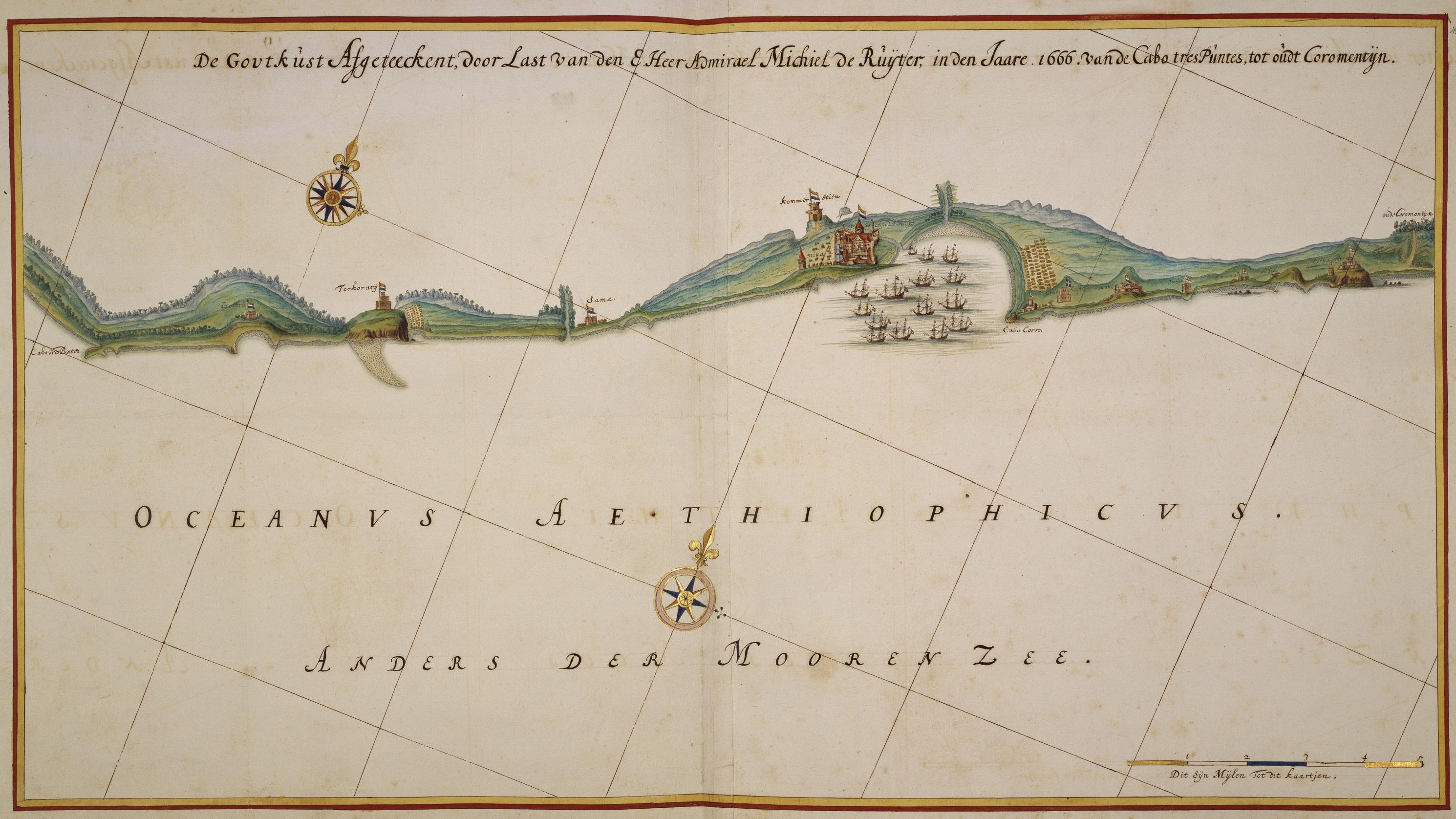
Map of the Gold Coast ordered by Admiral Michiel de Ruyter in 1666, during the Second Anglo-Dutch War

The WIC was given the monopoly on trade in the West Indies, including the Gold Coast, in 1621. Mismanagement meant that several disillusioned employees of the WIC left the company to work for another European power. Hendrik Carloff, for example, was a former high-ranking officer in the company, who joined the Swedish Africa Company, founded in 1649 by the Walloon-Dutch industrialist Louis De Geer. In the end, Carloff also left the Swedish company, this time for the Danish Africa Company, which he founded himself with Isaac Coymans and Nicolaes Pancras, also former WIC employees.

Whereas Swedish presence on the Gold Coast turned out to be only temporary, British and Danish settlement in the area proved to be permanent. From 1694 until 1700, the WIC fought the Komenda Wars with the British over trade rights with the Eguafo Kingdom. In addition, Brandenburgers also had forts in the area from 1682 onwards, until they were bought out by the Dutch in 1717. The Portuguese had completely left the area, but still the Gold Coast had the highest concentration of European military architecture outside of Europe.

=== Relationship with local peoples ===
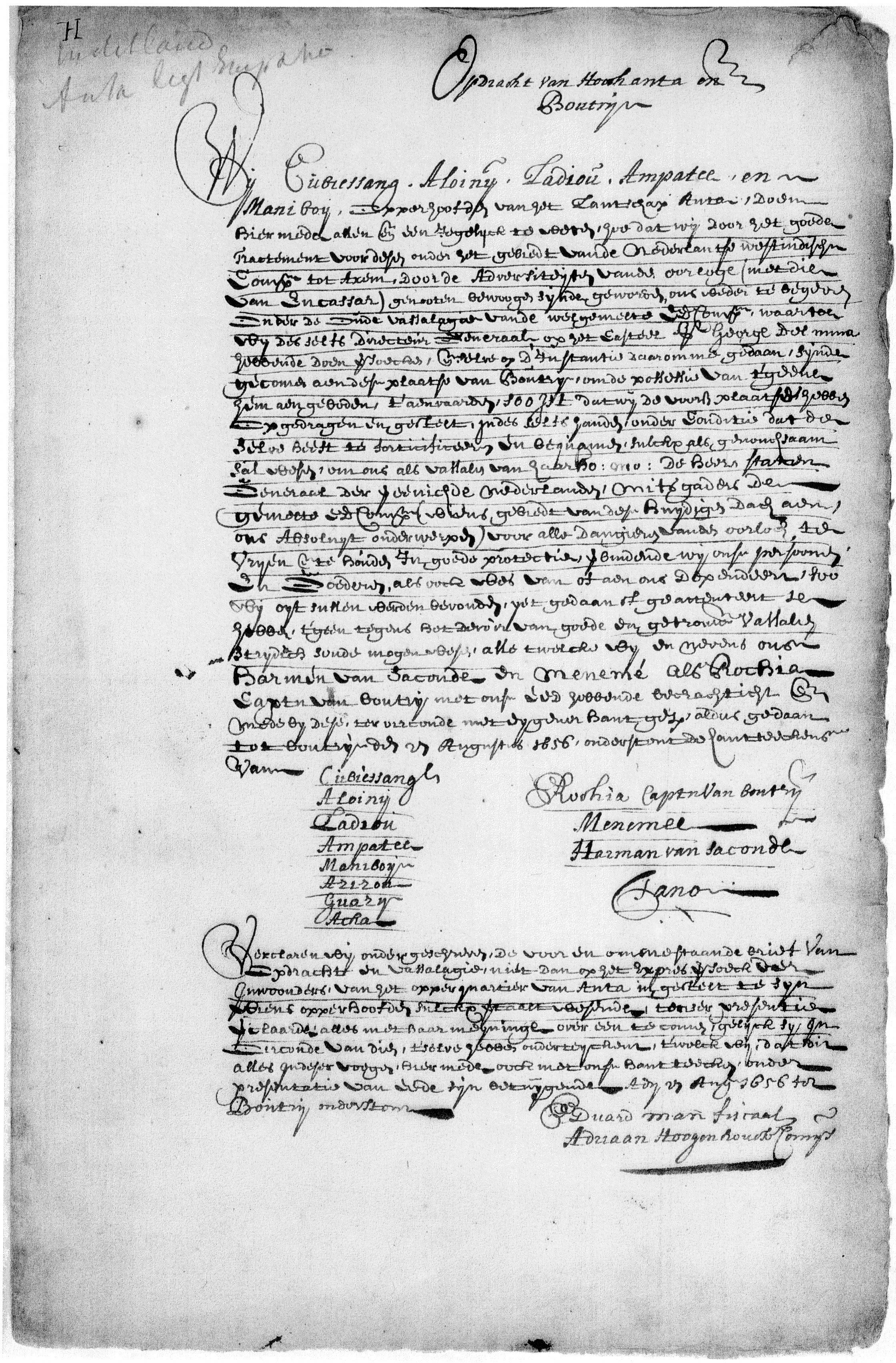
The first page of the Treaty of Butre, signed on 17 August 1656

The European powers were sometimes drawn into conflicts with local inhabitants as Europeans developed commercial alliances with local political authorities. These alliances, often complicated, involved both Europeans attempting to enlist or persuade their closest allies to attack rival European ports and their African allies, or conversely, various African powers seeking to recruit Europeans as mercenaries in their inter-state wars, or as diplomats to resolve conflicts. Another way conflicts with the local inhabitants were avoided was through marriage. European men often created alliances with the local African people through a practice known as cassare or calisare (Portuguese: casar, lit. 'to marry'). Dutch men and other Europeans would marry African women whose families had ties to the Atlantic slave trade. In this way, Europeans benefited from those marriages by corrupting African individuals in order to maintain the alliances responsible for massive, racial-based enslavement, which fabricated European wealth as much as fabricated African systemic impoverishment. In essence, African individuals profited at the expense of enslavement and impoverishment of African peoples, while European individuals profited as means of consolidating wealth for European peoples. African wives could receive money and schooling for the children they bore by European men. Wives could also inherit slaves and property from their husbands when they returned to Europe or died.

Many coastal ethnic groups in Africa, such as the Ga and Fante, used this system to gain economic and political advantages. These African ethnic groups had been using this practice before the arrival of the Europeans with strangers of a different ethnicity, and extended the same privilege to European men by the late 1400s. Cassare enabled Africans to trust strangers, like the Europeans, when dealing within their trade networks. It made the transition between stranger and trade partner a lot smoother.

At Elmina, the Dutch had inherited from the Portuguese a system in which tribute was paid to the Denkyira, who were the dominant power in the region. After the Battle of Feyiase (1701), the Ashanti Empire replaced the Denkyira as the dominant power, and the Dutch began paying tribute to the Ashanti instead. Although the existence of the so-called "Elmina Note" is often questioned, the Dutch generally paid two ounces of gold per month to the Ashanti as tribute. This bond between the Dutch and the Ashanti, who through the port of Elmina had access to trade with the Dutch and the rest of the world, deeply affected the relations between the Dutch, the other local peoples and the British. The latter were increasingly tight with the Fante, to which the Denkyira and thus also Elmina were culturally and linguistically close. Several Ashanti-Fante wars followed and the rivalry between the two peoples were key in the events surrounding the transfer of the Dutch Gold Coast to Britain in 1872.

After the Dutch managed to dislodge the Swedes from Butre and began building Fort Batenstein at that site, the leaders of the WIC thought it beneficial to negotiate a treaty with the local political leadership in order to establish a peaceful long-term relationship in the area. The local Ahanta leaders found it equally beneficial to enter into such an agreement, and thus on 27 August 1656, the Treaty of Butre was signed. This treaty established a Dutch protectorate in the area, and established diplomatic ties between the Dutch Republic and the Ahanta. The treaty's arrangements proved very stable and regulated Dutch-Ahanta diplomatic affairs for more than 213 years. Only after the Gold Coast was sold to Britain in 1872 were the provisions of the treaty abrogated.

On 18 February 1782, as part of the Fourth Anglo-Dutch War, the British attacked Elmina. Although this attack failed, Britain seized Fort Nassau, Fort Amsterdam, Fort Lijdzaamheid, Fort Goede Hoop and Fort Crêvecoeur from the Dutch. The Dutch Republic only managed to seize Fort Sekondi from the British. In the Treaty of Paris of 1784, all forts returned to their pre-war owners.

=== Disestablishment of the WIC and the abolition of slave trade ===
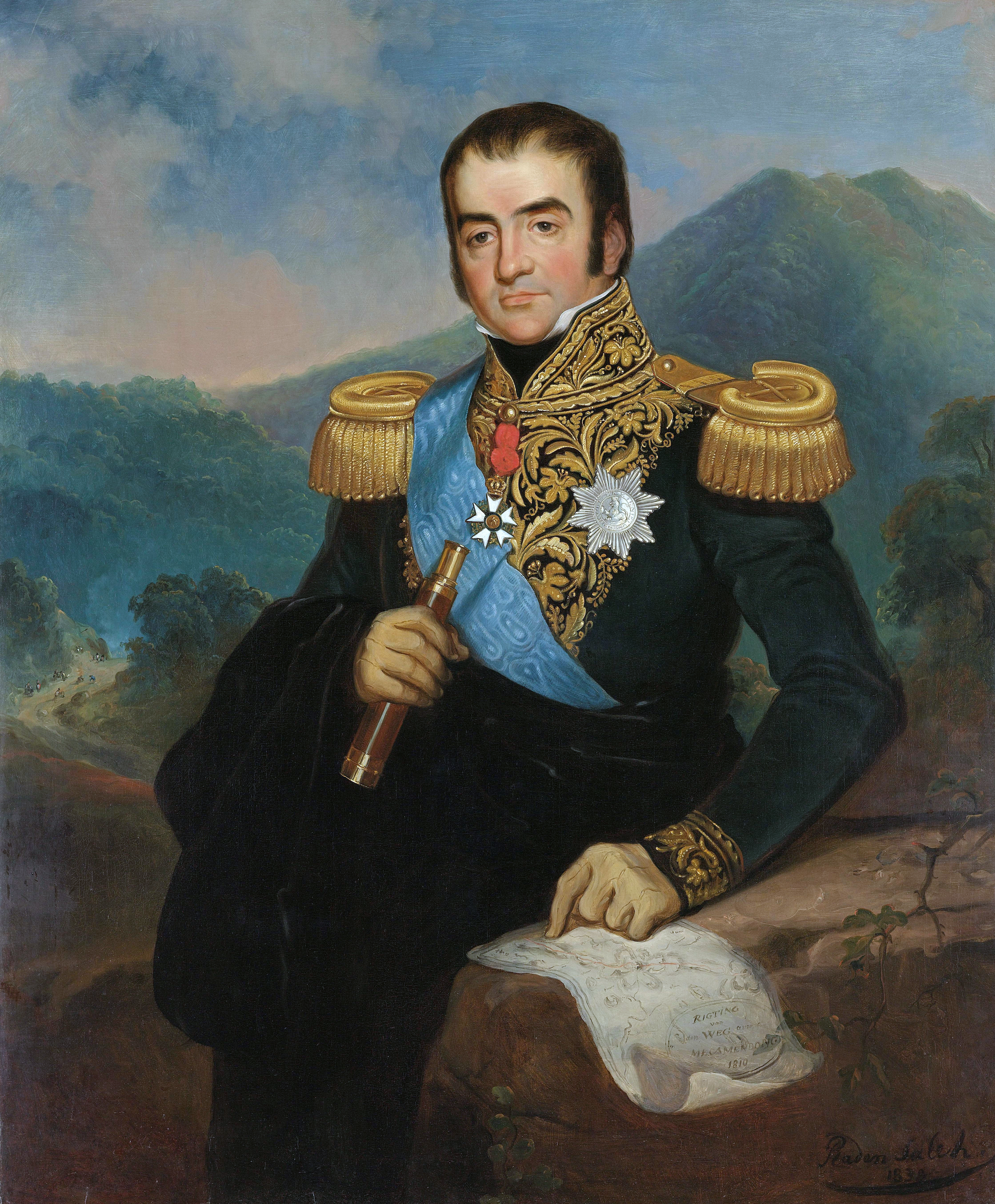
Portrait of Governor-General Herman Willem Daendels

In 1791, the WIC was disestablished, and on 1 January 1792, all territories held by the company reverted to the rule of the States-General of the Dutch Republic. During the French occupation of the Netherlands between 1810 and 1814, the Dutch possessions on the Gold Coast held the rather unusual position—together with the island of Deshima in Japan—of being the only Dutch territories not occupied by either France or Great Britain.

The British Slave Trade Act 1807 effectively ended all slave trade from the Gold Coast. William I of the Netherlands took over this abolition when he issued a royal decree to that effect in June 1814 and signed the Anglo-Dutch Slave Trade Treaty in May 1818. The abolition of slave trade was coupled with the arrival of Herman Willem Daendels as Governor-General. Daendels was a Patriot who played a major role in the Batavian Revolution, and subsequently became Governor-General of the Dutch East Indies for the Batavian Republic in 1807. This republican and revolutionist background made him controversial in the Kingdom of the Netherlands established in 1815, which effectively banned him from the country by assigning to him the rather obscure governorship of the Gold Coast in 1815.

Daendels tried to redevelop the rather dilapidated Dutch possessions as an African plantation colony driven by legitimate trade. Drawing on his experience in building the Great Post Road on the island of Java in the Dutch East Indies, he came up with some very ambitious infrastructural projects, including a comprehensive road system, with a main road connecting Elmina and Kumasi in Ashanti. The Dutch government gave him a free hand and a substantial budget to implement his plans. At the same time, however, Daendels regarded his governorship as an opportunity to establish a private business monopoly in the Dutch Gold Coast.

Eventually none of the plans came to fruition, as Daendels died of malaria in the castle of St. George in Elmina, the Dutch seat of government, on 8 May 1818. His body was interred in the central tomb at the Dutch cemetery in Elmina town. He had been in the country less than for two years.

=== Recruitment of soldiers for the Dutch East Indies Army ===
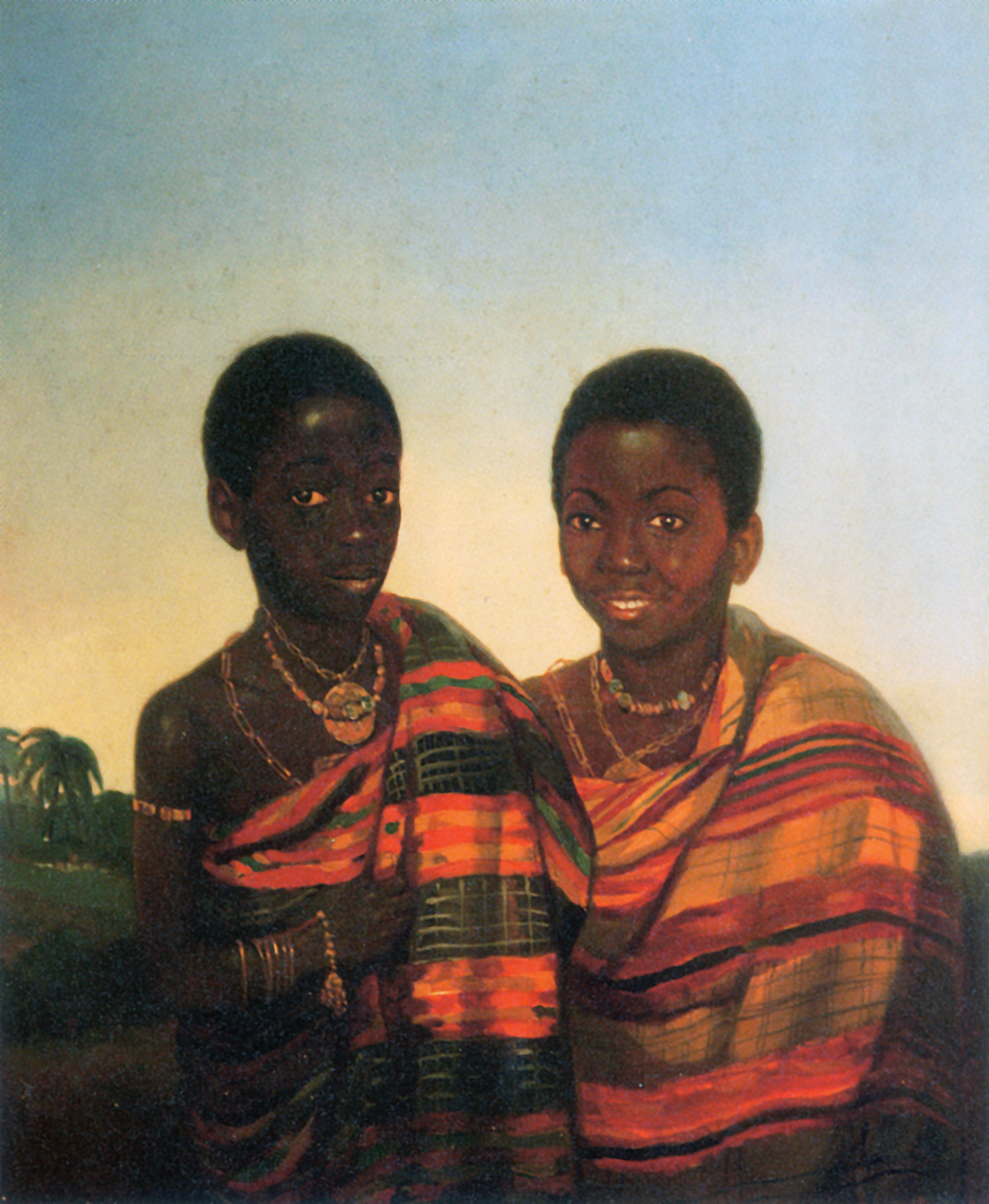
The Ashanti princes Kwasi Boachi and Kwame Poku, who were sent to the Netherlands to receive education - J.L. Cornet (ca. 1840)

In the remainder of the 19th century, the Dutch Gold Coast slowly fell into disarray. The only substantial development during this period was the recruitment of soldiers for the Dutch East Indies Army. This recruitment of the so-called Belanda Hitam (Indonesian for "Black Dutchmen") started in 1831 as an emergency measure as the Dutch army lost thousands of European soldiers and a much larger number of "native" soldiers in the Java War (1825–1830), and at the same time saw its own population base diminished by the independence of Belgium (1830). As the Dutch wanted the number of natives in the Dutch East Indies Army to be limited to roughly half the total strength to maintain the loyalty of native forces, the addition of forces from the Gold Coast seemed an ideal opportunity to keep the army at strength and loyal at the same time. It was also hoped that the African soldiers would be more resistant to the tropical climate and tropical diseases of the Dutch East Indies than European soldiers.

In 1836, the Dutch government had decided to recruit soldiers via the King of Ashanti. Major General Jan Verveer arrived for this purpose in Elmina on 1 November 1836, and went to the Ashanti capital of Kumasi with a delegation of about 900 people. After long negotiations, an agreement with King Kwaku Dua I was reached. A recruitment depot was established in Kumasi, and furthermore the king sent the young Ashanti princes Kwasi Boachi and Kwame Poku with General Verveer to take with him to the Netherlands, so that they could receive a good education. Kwasi Boachi later received education at the forerunner of the Delft University of Technology, and became the first black Dutch mining engineer in the Dutch East Indies. Dutch author Arthur Japin wrote a novel about the life of the two princes with The Two Hearts of Kwasi Boachi (1997).

=== Trade of forts with Britain and subsequent cession ===
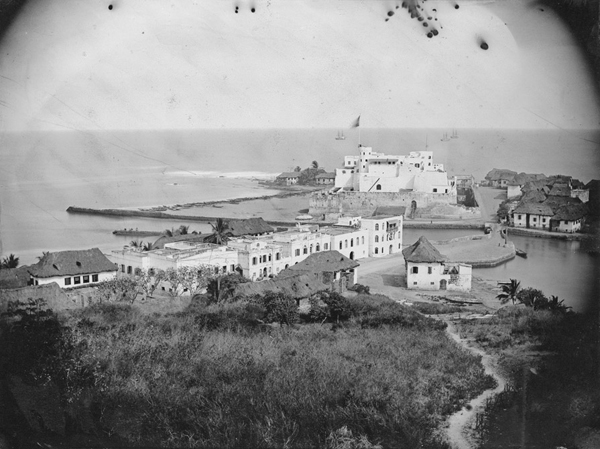
Rare photograph of Elmina (around 1865), showing parts of the old town later destroyed during the British bombardment

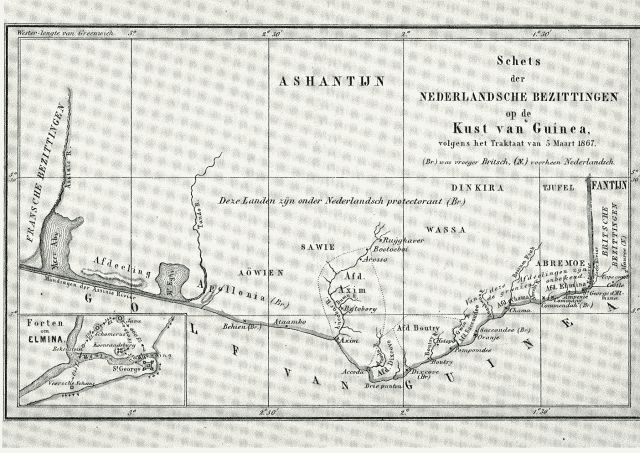
The Dutch Gold Coast after the transfer of forts with the British (1867)

Whereas the Dutch forts were a colonial backwater in the 19th century, the British forts were slowly developed into a full colony, especially after Britain took over the Danish Gold Coast in 1850. The presence of Dutch forts in an area that became increasingly influenced by the United Kingdom was deemed undesirable, and in the late 1850s British began pressing for either a buyout of the Dutch forts, or a trade of forts so as to produce more coherent areas of influence.

In the Dutch political landscape of the time, a buyout was not a possibility, so a trade of forts was negotiated. In 1867, the Convention between Great Britain and the Netherlands for an Interchange of Territory on the Gold Coast of Africa was signed, in which all Dutch forts to the east of Elmina were handed over to Britain, while the British forts west of Elmina were handed over to the Netherlands.

The trade proved a disaster for the Dutch, as their long-standing alliance with the mighty inland Ashanti Empire did not fare well with the coastal Fante population around the new forts assigned to them, who were allied with the British. To subject the local people around Fort Komenda, the Dutch had to send an expeditionary force to the local capital of Kwassie-Krom. Meanwhile, a Fante Confederacy was founded to drive the Dutch and their Ashanti allies out of Elmina. The confederacy founded an army, which marched to Elmina in March 1868. Although the army was deemed strong enough in April to begin the siege of the town, struggle between the various tribes united in the confederacy meant that the siege was lifted in May. In June, a peace treaty between the confederacy and Elmina was signed, in which Elmina pledged to be neutral if war was to break out between the Ashanti and Fante.

The blockade of the town by the confederacy was not lifted, however, and trade between Elmina and the Ashanti dropped to an absolute minimum. Attempts were made to persuade Elmina to join the confederacy, to no avail. Elmina and the Dutch sent a request for help to the king of Ashanti, whose army, under the leadership of Atjempon, arrived in Elmina on 27 December 1869. Unsurprisingly, the Ashanti army had an uncompromising attitude to their Fante rivals, making the prospect of a compromise between the Ashanti-backed Elminese and the new Fante-dominated forts transferred to the Dutch ever more difficult.

Meanwhile, in the Netherlands, the ongoing conflicts made the call for the transfer of the entire colony to Britain to become ever louder. The Dutch governor of Elmina, Cornelis Nagtglas, tried to persuade the Elminese to relinquish their city to the British. This was of course complicated by the presence of an Ashanti army in the town, which even arrested Nagtglas for a short while in April 1871. In February of that year, a treaty had been signed with the United Kingdom, under which terms the whole colony was to be ceded for a sum of 46,939.62 Dutch guilders. On 6 April 1872, after ratification of the treaty by parliament, Elmina was formally handed over to Britain.

=== Destruction of Elmina ===
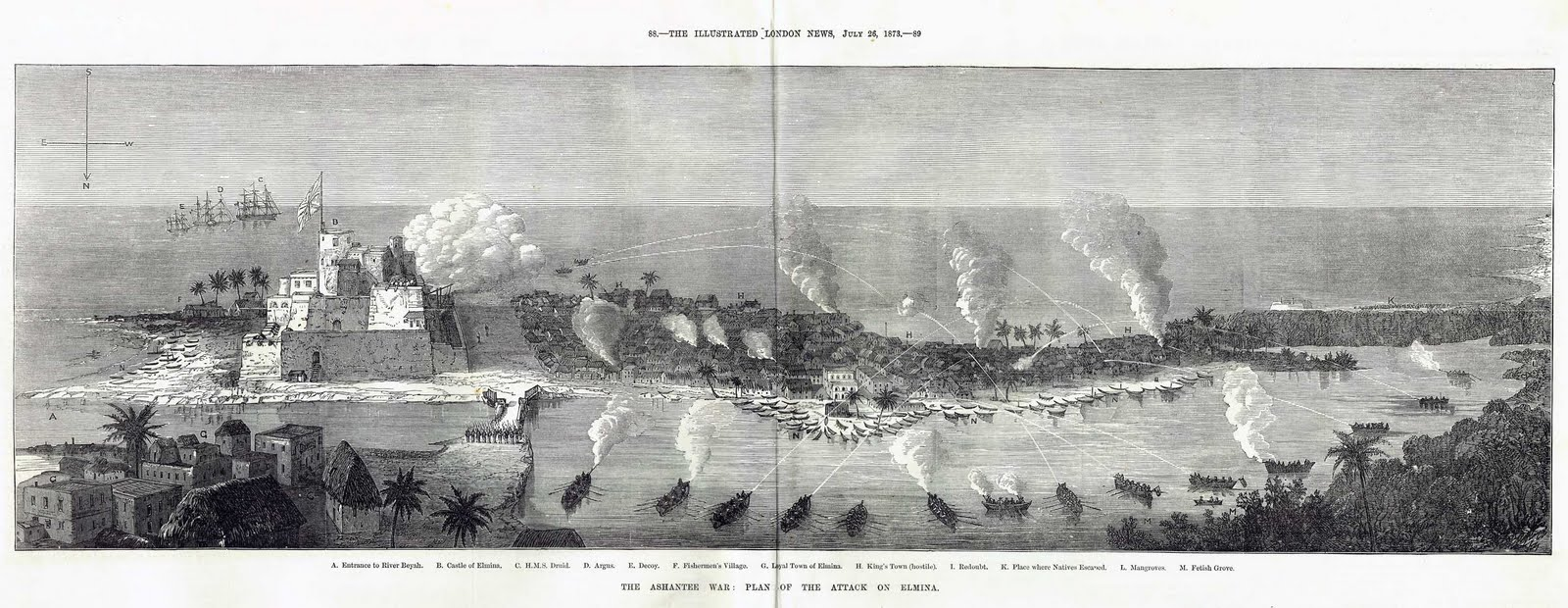
The bombardment of Elmina (1873)

As was to be expected, the Ashanti were less pleased by the handover of Elmina to the Fante-allied British. Ashanti king Kofi Karikari posited that the "Elmina Note", which governed the tribute paid by the Dutch to the Ashanti, asserted Ashanti sovereignty over the town. In June 1873, the situation escalated when an Ashanti army marched to Elmina to "win back" the town from Britain. The Third Anglo-Ashanti War had started, and Britain began bombing Elmina on 13 June 1873. The old town of Elmina was completely destroyed and levelled to make room for a parade ground.

== Administration ==
=== Dutch West India Company (WIC) ===
During the reign of the WIC, the government of the colony was headed by a Director-General. The Director-General was assisted by a Council composed of senior colonial officers. Aside from being the supreme ruler of the colony, the Director-General was also the supreme commander of the land and sea forces, and highest judicial officer. The Director-General had a double mandate, being installed by both the States-General of the Dutch Republic and the WIC. The colonial government was based at Fort Nassau in Moree between 1621 and 1637, and at Fort George in Elmina from 1637 onward.

When the Dutch conquered Luanda and São Tomé from the Portuguese in 1642, the WIC's possessions on the coast of Africa were divided into two separate commandments. The government at Elmina was charged with the rule over "Guinea and its dependencies from Cabo Tres Puntas to Cabo Lopes Gonsalves," and the government at Luanda with the possessions south of the latter cape, including São Tomé. The title of the Director-General at Elmina was changed to "Director-General of the North Coast of Africa." When the Dutch lost Luanda to the Portuguese in 1648, São Tomé was shortly ruled from Elmina, until it was recaptured by the Portuguese as well in the same year.

With the establishment of the Second WIC in 1675, the government structure was revised. The area under the authority of the Director-General was redefined as "the Coast of Africa, from Sierra Leone all exclusively to 30 degrees South of the equator, together with all the islands in between," thereby nominally reinstating the claim on the territories lost in this area to the Portuguese. The title of the Director-General was concurrently changed to "Director-General of the North and South Coast of Africa." This larger claim was not primarily meant to reclaim Luanda and São Tomé from the Portuguese, however, but merely to establish authority over Dutch trade in the area. This was especially relevant for Loango, from which the Dutch began buying slaves in large amounts from the 1670s onward. Until the liquidation of the WIC in 1791, the title of the Director-General and the limits of jurisdiction remained the same.

==== Composition of the Council ====
According to the 1722 government instruction, the Council comprised the Director-General, who functioned as the council's president, the fiscal (Dutch: fiscaal), the senior merchant (Dutch: opperkoopman), and the senior commissioners (Dutch: oppercommies). These senior commissioners consisted of the head of Fort Saint Anthony at Axim, the head of Fort Nassau at Moree, the head of Fort Crèvecoeur at Accra, and the head of the factory at Ouidah, on the Dutch Slave Coast. Between 1746 and 1768, the Council consisted of the Director-General, the fiscal, and the seven highest ranking "first officials", which included the senior commissioners, the master of works (Dutch: equipagemeester), the bookkeeper-general (Dutch: boekhouder-generaal), and the ensign (Dutch: vaandrig). In 1768, the council was again reduced to the fiscal, the three senior commissioners (the trading post at Ouidah has since been abandoned), and the commissioner-and councillor. The composition of the council was changed for a final time in 1784, in the wake of the Fourth Anglo-Dutch War, now extending the membership to include the bookkeeper-general-and-commissioner.

=== Direct Dutch rule ===
After the liquidation of the WIC in 1791, the Council of Colonies for the West Indies took over the government of the Dutch Gold Coast. Little changed in the first years, and the old administration of the WIC was left largely intact.

This changed when the Batavian Republic replaced the Dutch Republic in 1795. The administration of the Dutch Gold Coast was reformed by a secret resolution of 12 May 1801. The office of Director-General was renamed Governor-General, and the council was split in a Great Council and a Small Council. The Small Council was responsible for the everyday government of the colony, and comprised the Governor-General, the administrator-and-Director-General (Dutch: administrateur en directeur-generaal),^{Note 1} the master of stores, the master of works, and the bookkeeper of the general office (Dutch: boekhouder ten comptoir-generaal). The Great Council consisted of the Small Council, with the addition of the residents of Fort Crèvecoeur at Accra, Fort Saint Anthony at Axim, Fort Saint Sebastian at Shama, and Fort Amsterdam at Kormatin, and met every three months.

The administration of the Dutch Gold Coast was again reformed when, in 1806, the Batavian Republic was itself superseded by the Kingdom of Holland, a satellite kingdom of the French Empire. By royal decree of Louis Bonaparte, the newly installed King of Holland and a younger brother of Napoleon Bonaparte, the office of Governor-General was demoted to Commandant-General in 1807, and the administration was overhauled in 1809. An even bigger change came with the establishment of the Kingdom of the Netherlands in 1815. Leaving behind the uncertain years of French occupation, and with slave trade abolished, the newly established kingdom put up a plan to transform the colony into a profitable plantation colony. For this purpose, the new governor Herman Willem Daendels was given an open mandate and a large budget. The project was cut short with Daendels early death in 1818, however.

Left without a visionary governor, budgets were cut for the colony. The new regulations of 1 November 1819 reduced the budget to the minimum necessary to keep the colony running, fired all unnecessary colonial officers, and pensioned of most of the slaves of the state. Most notably, the offices of bookkeeper, fiscal, secretary, cashier, and bailiff were combined into one office, the summation of functions actually being the office-holder's title (Dutch: boekhouder, fiscaal, secretaris, kassier en deurwaarder). Also, the office of Governor-General was demoted to Commander. When the Dutch decided to recruit soldiers for the Dutch East Indies Army in 1836, the government was strengthened again, something which was reinforced in the wake of the disastrous Ahanta War of 1838. By virtue of a royal decree dated 23 March 1838, the office of Commander was raised to Governor and extra officers were installed to make government more effective. The government itself was reformed in 1847, which among its most notable inventions included the establishment of a Court of Justice, legally separate from the council, although memberships often overlapped. The office of fiscal, responsible for public prosecution, was renamed Officer of Justice.

In the late 1850s, the administrative divisions into forts was changed into a division into districts (Dutch: afdelingen), asserting Dutch sovereignty (or suzerainty) over not only the forts, but also the territory surrounding the forts. District officers were instructed to make surveys of physical, economic, and socio-political situation of the districts. As a consequence of the tariff system set up in the Anglo-Dutch Gold Coast Treaty, a tax and customs office was established in Elmina in 1867. At the same time, a postal office was established as well.

== Economy ==
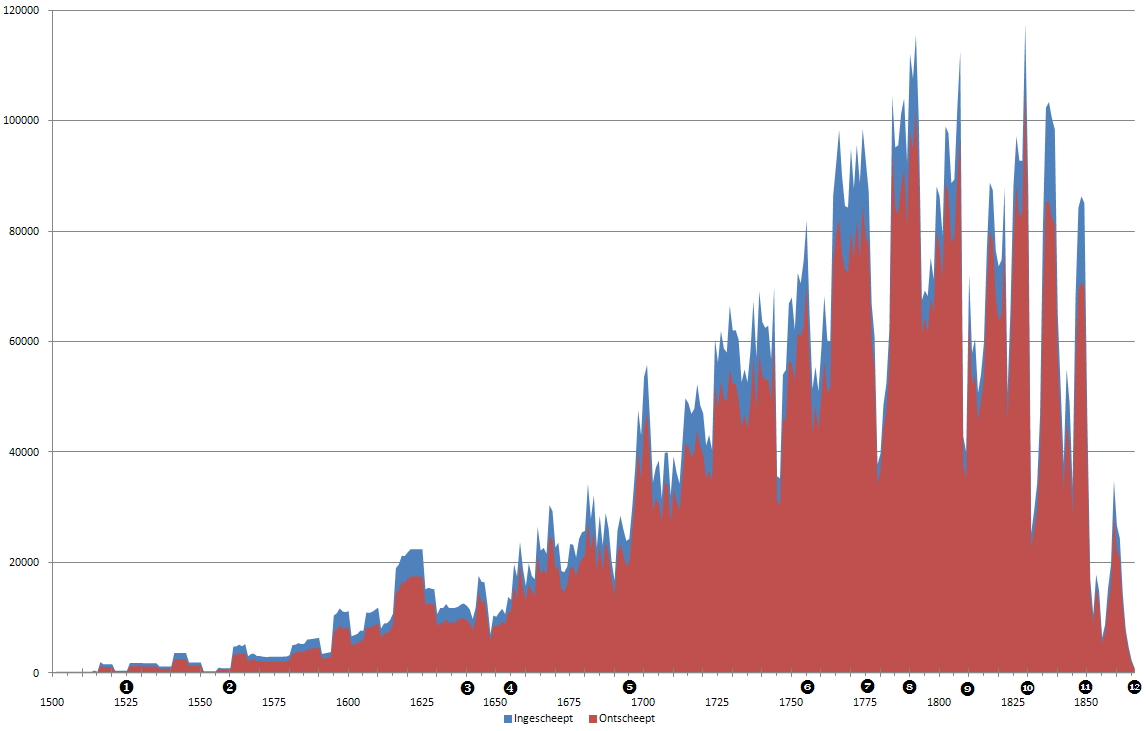
Estimates of the Atlantic slave trade. The blue bar represents the number of slaves that boarded ships in Africa, the red bar the number that disembarked in America, the remainder having died during the voyage.

Although the colony is nowadays primarily associated with Atlantic slave trade, this was not the reason for the first Dutch traders to trade with the Gold Coast. Barent Eriksz made a profit trading gold, ivory, and West African pepper, and these products remained the primary trading goods in the early 17th century. According to Joannes de Laet, the WIC had transported West African goods worth 14 million Dutch guilders to the Dutch Republic by 1637, of which the most important was the trade in gold.

This changed with the gradual capture of Brazil from the Portuguese, from 1630 onward. Suddenly, the trade of slaves, for which there was no significant market earlier, became a necessity for the economic survival of Dutch Brazil. Nicolas van Yperen, Governor of the Dutch possessions on the Gold Coast, was instructed by his superiors of the WIC to supply Dutch Brazil with slaves. In 1636, he managed to ship around a thousand slaves to Brazil from Fort Nassau, but to secure a continuous flow of slave labour, the company decided it was necessary to attempt once more to capture Elmina from the Portuguese. After Elmina was finally captured in August 1637, the focus of trade for the WIC shifted to slave trade. The directors of the WIC were not happy with the increasing slave trade on the Gold Coast itself, however, as it interfered with the profitable gold trade, and actively tried to move the slave trade to the Slave Coast, where they had trading posts from 1640 onward.

The loss of Brazil did not collapse Dutch slave trade, as in 1662, Dutch signed their first asiento with the Spanish Empire, pledging to provide slaves to Spanish America, primarily through their trading post in Willemstad, Curaçao. Furthermore, in 1664, the Dutch conquered Suriname, complementing Berbice and Essequibo as Caribbean plantation colonies depending on slave labour.

Meanwhile, the Dutch had tried in 1654 to directly control the mining of gold by building Fort Ruychaver far inland on the Ankobra River, but had left gold production to the locals since that fort was attacked and burned to the ground in 1660. The supply of gold declined dramatically at the turn of the eighteenth century, due to warfare among the states of the Gold Coast. While the Ashanti succeeded in the Battle of Feyiase of 1701 to establish their hegemony on the Gold Coast, it took them a few years to fully "pacify" their newly conquered territory. 1701 proved to be the historic low for the gold trade, with only 530 mark of gold exported, worth 178.080 guilders.

Whereas the supply of gold was declining, the supply of slaves boomed as never before. This was to a large part due to the Ashanti wars; Governor-General Willem de la Palma wrote to his superiors at the WIC that the war had unleashed slave raids among the local peoples in the Gold Coast. Whereas between 1693 and 1701, 1,522 slaves were transported from Elmina to the Americas, an average of 169 slaves per year, 1,213 slaves were transported between 1702 and 1704, an average of 404 per year.

Apart from increased supply of slaves, the demand also increased due to the asiento trading with the Spanish. Between 1660 and 1690, the Dutch trading posts in Africa, which included the Slave Coast, Arguin, and Senegambia, shipped a third of the total number of slaves across the Atlantic. On the Gold Coast, Governor De la Palma actively tried to systemise the slave trade and improve the numbers of slave shipped to the Americas. To this purpose, he sent Jacob van den Broucke as "opperkommies" (head merchant) to the Dutch trading post at Ouidah, on the Slave Coast.

De la Palma was a difficult personality and often at odds with his merchants and local African leaders. He resigned from his position in September 1705, but died before he could return to the Dutch Republic. He was replaced by his deputy, Pieter Nuyts, who tried to revive the gold trade at the coast.

But by the beginning of the eighteenth century, even slave trade dwindled, with the Dutch becoming a rather small player in the trans-Atlantic trade. Since globally this trade peaked in the 18th century, this meant that the Dutch contribution to the Atlantic slave trade only amounts to 5% of the grand total, equalling around 500,000 slaves shipped from Africa to the Americas.

In 1730, the monopoly of the WIC on the Atlantic slave trade was lifted. This contributed to the rise of the Middelburgsche Commercie Compagnie (MCC), which dominated the Dutch slave trade for much of the eighteenth century.

=== The Gold Coast economy in the 19th century ===
With the Anglo-Dutch Treaty of 1814, the Dutch vowed to stop trading slaves. This meant a severe blow to the economy of the Gold Coast, which had increasingly relied on slave trade from the 18th century onwards. Attempts were made to establish a plantation colony and to open gold mines on the coast, but virtually all attempts proved failures.

One of the first attempts at establishing a plantation was made by the sons of Governor-General Herman Willem Daendels in 1816. They established a plantation named Oranje Dageraad in Simbo. The Governor-General himself tried to buy 300 slaves from Kumasi, which were to regain their freedom by cultivating farmland. Both projects failed.

Between 1845 and 1850, the colonial government once again, after the failure of Fort Ruychaver, tried to establish a gold mine on the coast. The Dutch government bought an open-air gold mine from the chief of Butre, and sent in 1845 an expedition of a director, three engineers, and nine workers to the village of Dabokrom to establish a mine. Two engineers and all nine workers fell victim to tropical diseases and died, leaving the rest of the expedition to return to Europe. The second expedition of 1847 was not less successful, now with 11 out of 13 people dying. By 1850, the Dutch government ended the mining attempt.

Another attempt to develop the colony involved the establishment of a cotton plantation just outside Elmina. In light of this project, a Brazilian man by the name of La Rocha Vièra was brought to the Gold Coast. Due to the rude treatment of workers, La Rocha Vièra was unable to attract new labourers, and the plantation died an early death. In 1848, a tobacco plantation was attempted in the government's garden in Elmina, but failed due to bad soil conditions. A more successful tobacco plantation was established in Simbo, but fell victim to a lack of labourers wanting to work on the plantation. From February to October 1859, Dutch colonial government official J.S.G. Gramberg tried to develop the soil on the Bossumprah River, but also had difficulty attracting workers.

The only two plantations that were successful comprised a coffee plantation in Akropong, established by missionaries from Basel, and another coffee plantation in Mayra near Accra, owned by mulatto entrepreneur Lutterodt, worked by slaves.

== Society ==
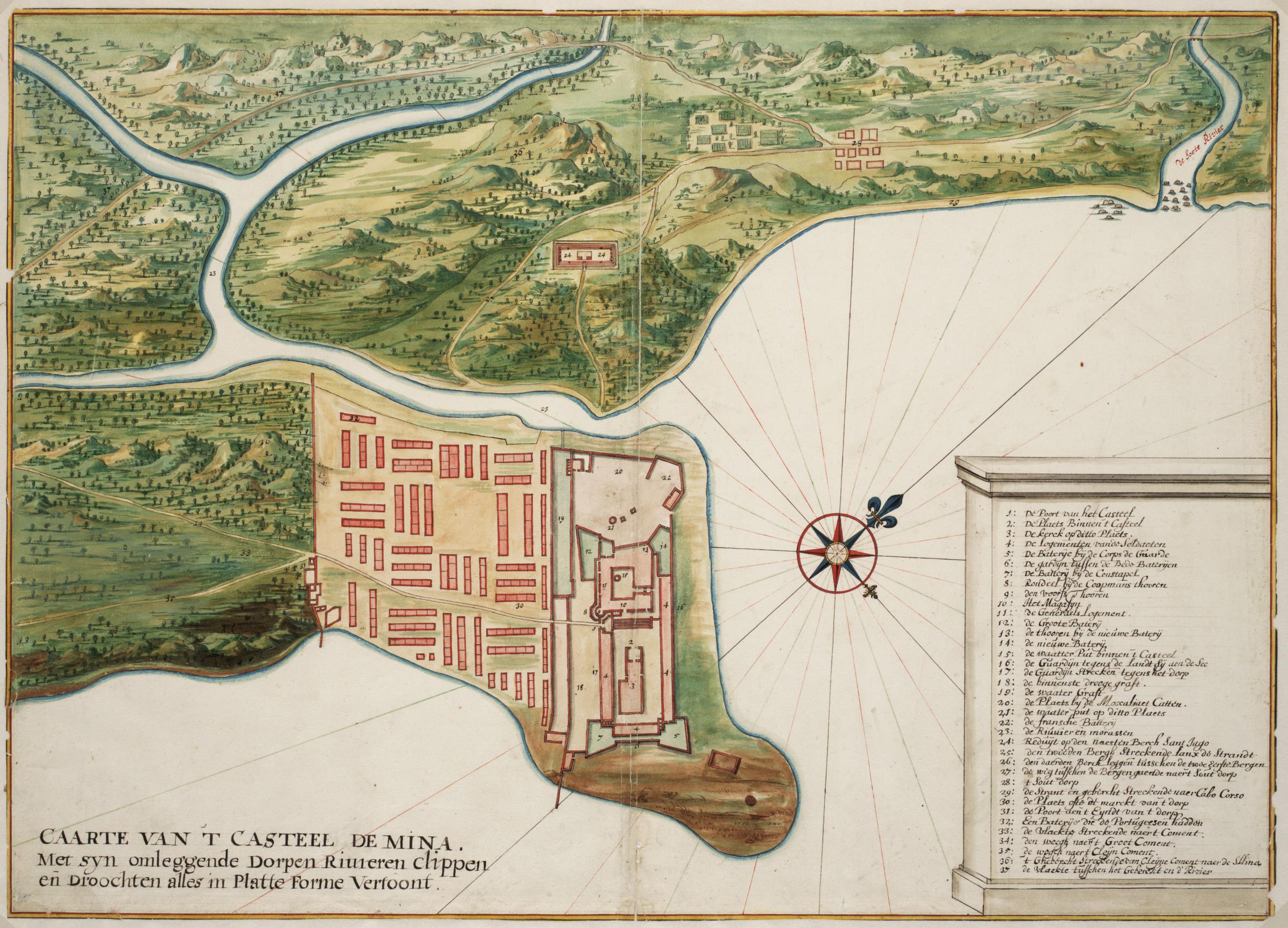
Map of Elmina around 1665 by Johannes Vingboons

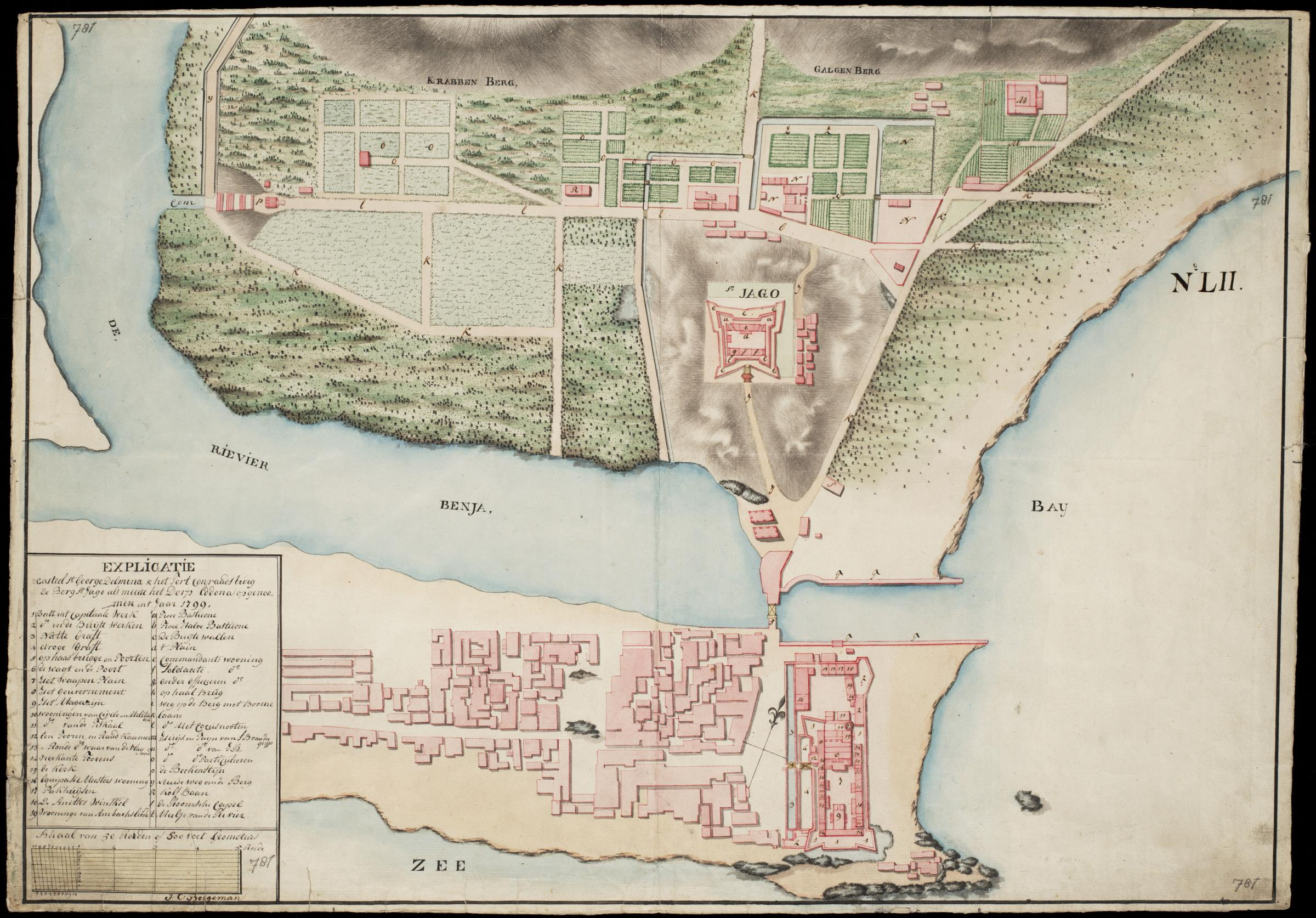
Map of Elmina around 1799 by J.C. Bergeman

Until the destruction of Elmina in 1873, the town was the largest settlement on the Gold Coast, eclipsing Accra and Kumasi. In the 18th century, its population numbered 12,000 to 16,000 inhabitants, and in the 19th century, this figure rose to between 18,000 and 20,000. Most of these inhabitants were not European, however; their number peaked at 377 WIC employees for the entire Dutch Gold Coast in the 18th century, before sinking back to a mere 20 officers in the 19th century.

Much more important were the African inhabitants of Elmina, who came from every region of the Gold Coast to Elmina to try their luck. Slaves formed a considerable portion of the population of Elmina as well, and were often in the possession of the Akan people inhabitants themselves. The third group in Elmina was of mixed race, and the result of interracial relations between WIC employees and African women in Elmina. The illegitimate children of the employees were called "Tapoeijers" by the Dutch, for, according to them, the colour of their skin resembled those of native Americans. A decree from 1700 by the Governor-General at Elmina stipulated that employees of the WIC who were to return to the Netherlands either had to take their (illegitimate) children with them, or had to pay a sum of money to provide for their "Christian upbringing". For the latter purpose, a school was established in Elmina.

Many people of mixed descent, also referred to as Euro-Africans, became wealthy merchants. The most prominent of these was Jan Niezer, who visited Europe on several occasions, and who traded directly with European and American companies.

The fourth group in Elmina was also of mixed descent, but had a different status as "Vrijburghers" ('free citizens'). They had the same rights as Europeans, and were organised in a separate in so-called Asafo company known as "Akrampafo". Their burgemeester ('mayor') had the power to conclude treaties with the Dutch, and all Vrijburghers had the right to wear a sword. Well known Vrijburghers include Carel Hendrik Bartels, Jacob Huidecoper, and Jacob Simon. Many Vrijburghers worked in the lower ranks of the Dutch administration of Elmina, and in the 19th century, various Vrijburgher families sent their children (girls included) to Europe for education. In the 19th century, the Vrijburghers settled north of the Benya lagune, near Fort Coenraadsburg. This part of Elmina, also known as "the Garden", was spared from British bombardment in 1873.

=== Wilhelm Amo and Jacobus Capitein ===
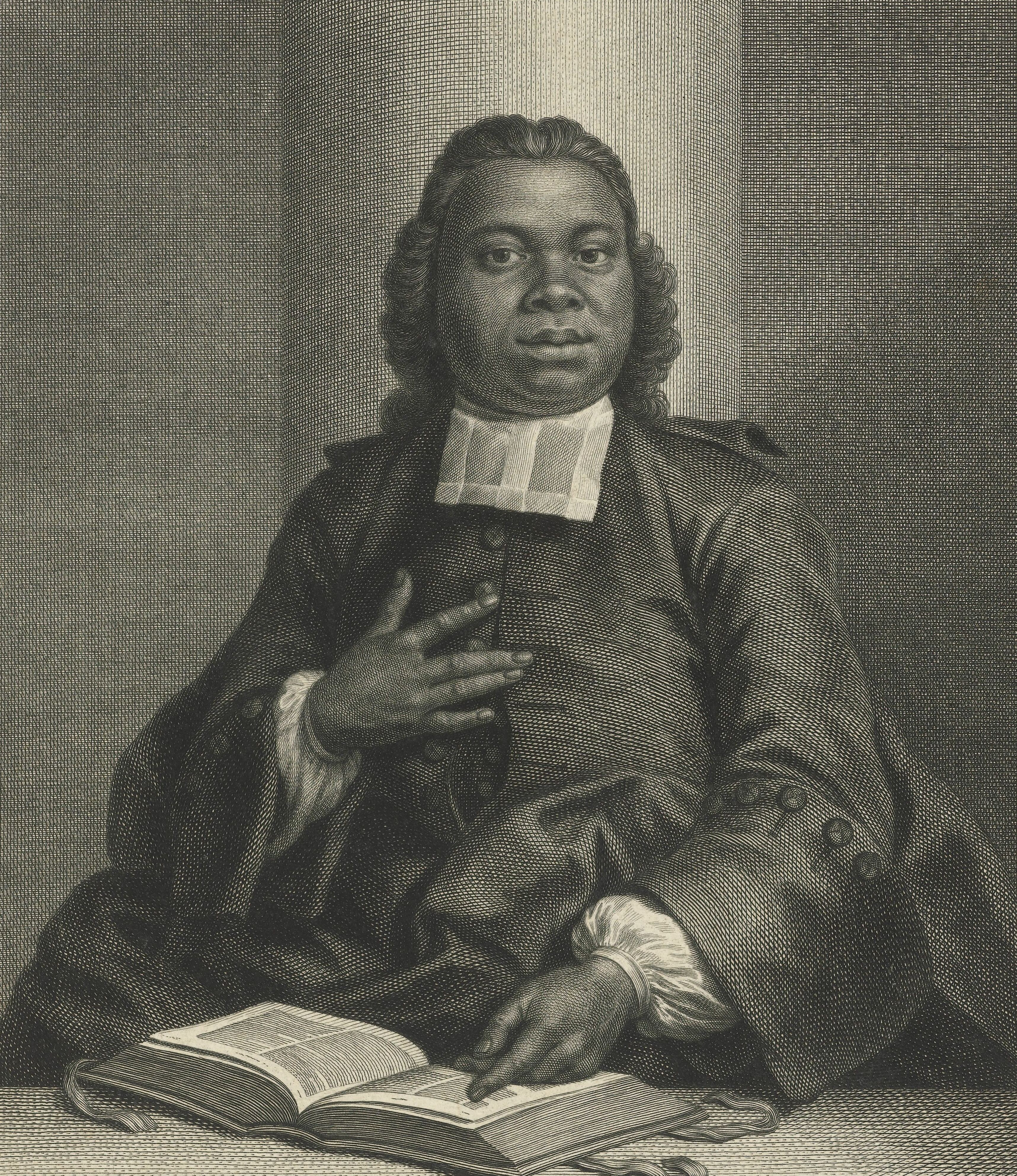
Portrait of Jacobus Capitein

The presence of European powers on the Gold Coast opened up the area to the outside world, and some Africans from the Gold Coast achieved a modicum of accomplishment in European society. Two Africans from the Gold Coast are especially notable in this regard, although one of them is notorious for defending slavery as compatible with Christianity.

Anton Wilhelm Amo was born near Axim in 1703 and sent to Amsterdam by the WIC around 1707. He was given as a present to Anthony Ulrich, Duke of Brunswick-Wolfenbüttel. Amo was baptised, went to school at the Wolfenbüttel Ritter-Akademie (1717–1721) the University of Helmstedt (1721–1727), and the University of Halle (1727–1729), and subsequently gained a doctorate in philosophy at the University of Wittenberg in 1734 with the thesis On the Absence of Sensation in the Human Mind and its Presence in our Organic and Living Body, in which he argued against Cartesian dualism and in favour of a broadly materialist account of the person. In 1740, Amo took up a post in philosophy at the University of Jena, but in 1747 he returned to the Gold Coast where he died in 1759. Amo was the first black person to attend a European university. He lies interred in the graveyard of Fort San Sebastian.

Around 1717, Jacobus Capitein was born in the Gold Coast. He was forcibly taken to the Netherlands in 1725, where he was given to Jacobus van Goch. Capitein excelled at school and announced during his baptism in 1735 that he wanted to return to the Gold Coast as a missionary. To that effect, he studied at Leiden University between 1737 and 1742, graduating on a dissertation defending slavery. He was subsequently installed by the Dutch East India Company (VOC) as a Christian minister at Elmina, where he married Antonia Ginderdros. Ashanti king Opoku Ware I demanded that Capitein teach his children, which he did. Capitein died in Elmina in 1747.

== Legacy ==
After the Dutch East Indies gained independence as Indonesia in 1949, most Belanda Hitam migrated to the Netherlands, since they had been soldiers of the Royal Netherlands East Indies Army. Other than that, the Dutch colonial history on the Gold Coast was more or less forgotten. This changed slightly after Arthur Japin published the earlier mentioned The Two Hearts of Kwasi Boachi in 1997. This attention also revealed that the head of Ahanta king Badu Bonsu II, taken to the Netherlands after his execution in 1838, was still in the possession of the Leiden University Medical Centre. The head of the king was handed over to the Ghanaian ambassador in a ceremony held on 23 July 2009 in The Hague.

In 2002, the 300 year anniversary of diplomatic ties between Ghana and the Netherlands was celebrated, with Dutch Crown Prince Willem-Alexander and his wife Máxima visiting Ghana between 14 and 17 April, and with Ashanti king Otumfuo Nana Osei Tutu II visiting the Netherlands in June. The anniversary referred to is the sending by the WIC of David van Neyendael as envoy to the Ashanti Empire in 1701, after the Ashanti had become the dominant power on the Gold Coast by defeating the Denkyira at the Battle of Feyiase.

Remnants of Dutch presence in the Gold Coast, other than the forts along the coastline, are Dutch surnames which were taken on by the descendants of the children the Dutch slave traders had with their black mistresses. Bossman is a common surname in Ghana, and ultimately derives from the Dutch slave trader Willem Bosman. Other Ghanaian surnames derived from Dutch names include "Bartels", "van Dyck" (modern Dutch spelling: "van Dijk"), and "de Veer". In an episode of Who Do You Think You Are?, British-Ghanaian actor Hugh Quarshie traced his ancestry to Pieter Martinus Johannes Kamerling, a Dutch official on the Gold Coast.

== Settlements ==
=== Main forts ===
Map of the main forts of the Dutch Gold Coast

| Place in Ghana | Fort name | Founded/ Occupied | Ceded | Comments |
|---|---|---|---|---|
| Moree | Fort Nassau | 1598 (1612) | 1868 | The first Dutch trading post on the Gold Coast opened around 1598. In 1612, it was expanded to a fort. Capital of the Dutch Gold Coast between 1598 and 1637. Occupied between 1781 and 1785 by the British. Traded with the British in 1868. |
| Butri | Fort Batenstein | 1598 (1656) | 1872 | Second Dutch trading post on the Gold Coast. Expanded to Fort Batenstein in 1656. Site of the signing of the Treaty of Butre. |
| Elmina | Fort Elmina | 1637 | 1872 | Captured from the Portuguese in the Battle of Elmina (1637). Capital of the Dutch Gold Coast between 1637 and 1872. |
| Elmina | Fort Coenraadsburg | 1637 (1665) | 1872 | Captured from the Portuguese together with Fort Elmina. Originally a reinforced chapel on Saint Jago Hill from which Fort Elmina could easily be attacked. For this reason reinforced by the Dutch after the capture of Elmina. Extended to a full fort in 1665. |
| Shama | Fort San Sebastian | 1640 | 1872 | Captured from the Portuguese in 1640. |
| Axim | Fort Santo Antonio | 1642 | 1872 | Captured from the Portuguese. Occupied between 1664 and 1665 by the British. Site of the signing of the Treaty of Axim. |
| Accra | Fort Crèvecoeur | 1642 | 1868 | Situated near Fort Christiansborg (Danish), and Fort James (British). Occupied between 1781 and 1786 by the British. Traded with the British in 1868. |
| Sekondi | Fort Orange | 1642 (1690) | 1872 | Trading post established by the Dutch in 1642. Enlarged into a fort in 1690, and destroyed by the Ahanta in 1694. Restored afterwards. |
| Takoradi | Fort Witsen | 1665 | 1872 | Originally built by the Swedes. |
| Cormantin | Fort Amsterdam | 1665 | 1868 | First British fort (1631) on the Gold Coast, captured in 1665 by Engel de Ruyter. Occupied between 1781 and 1785 by the British. Traded with the British in 1868. |
| Senya Beraku | Fort Goede Hoop | 1667 | 1868 | Occupied between 1781 and 1785 by the British, and occupied by the local Akim between 1811 and 1816. Traded with the British in 1868. |
| Akwidaa | Fort Dorothea | 1687 | 1872 | Formerly part of the Brandenburger Gold Coast. First occupied by the Dutch in 1687 and finally bought in 1721. |
| Komenda | Fort Vredenburgh | 1682 | 1872 | A trading post was established by the Dutch near this site around 1600, but abandoned soon afterwards. The fort was built in 1682. In 1687, the English Fort Komenda was built nearby. Occupied between 1781 and 1785 by the British. |
| Apam | Fort Lijdzaamheid | 1697 | 1868 | Occupied between 1781 and 1785 by the British. Traded with the British in 1868. |
| Princess Town | Fort Hollandia | 1724 | 1872 | Formerly part of the Brandenburger Gold Coast, bought in 1721 by the Dutch. Up until 1724 occupied by the local Jan Conny. |

=== Trade of forts with Britain ===
In 1868, the United Kingdom and the Netherlands traded some forts in order to create more geographically contiguous areas of influence. The Netherlands ceded Fort Nassau, Fort Crêvecoeur, Fort Amsterdam, Fort Goede Hoop, and Fort Lijdzaamheid, and in return received Apollonia (renamed Fort Willem III), Fort Dixcove (renamed Fort Metalen Kruis), Fort Komenda (not to be confused with the already Dutch Fort Vredenburgh, also in Komenda), and Fort Sekondi (not to be confused with the already Dutch Fort Orange, also in Sekondi). This arrangement proved short-lived, as the colony was completely ceded to the United Kingdom in 1872.

| Place in Ghana | Fort name | Founded/ Occupied | Ceded | Comment |
|---|---|---|---|---|
| Beyin | Fort Willem III | 1868 | 1872 | Previously British Fort Apollonia. |
| Dixcove | Fort Metalen Kruis | 1868 | 1872 | Previously British Fort Dixcove. |
| Komenda | Fort Komenda | 1868 | 1872 | Previously British Fort Komenda. |
| Sekondi | Fort Sekondi | 1868 | 1872 | Previously British Fort Sekondi. |

=== Temporarily held forts ===
Apart from the main forts held for more than a century, other forts in the region have been temporarily occupied by the Dutch:

| Place in Ghana | Fort name | Founded/ Occupied | Ceded | Comments |
|---|---|---|---|---|
| Cape Coast | Cape Coast Castle | 1637 | 1652 | |
| Anomabu | Fort William | 1640 | 1652 | |
| Egya | Fort Egya | 1647 | 1664 | English trading post built in 1647, but conquered in the same year by the Dutch. Demolished in 1665 by the British after they had recaptured it in the year before. |
| Ankobra | Fort Ruychaver | 1654 | 1659 | Built together with Fort Elise Carthago on the Ankobra River. Attacked by the local population and abandoned. |
| Ankobra | Fort Elize Carthago | 1702 | 1706 (?) | Dutch trading post between 1650 and 1702. |
| Keta | Fort Singelenburgh | 1734 | 1737 | Destroyed by the Dutch in 1737 after it was attacked by the local population. The Danish built Fort Prinsensten near the abandoned fort in 1784. |
| Sekondi | Fort Sekondi | 1782 | 1785 | Captured from the British in the Fourth Anglo-Dutch War. Given back, but regained in 1868 as part of a forts trade with the United Kingdom (see above). |

== See also ==
- Colonial Heads of Dutch Gold Coast
- History of Ghana
- Dutch Loango-Angola
- Ministry of the Colonies (Netherlands)

== Notes ==
- ^Note 1 Note that this office is quite different from the office of Director-General in the administration of the Dutch West India Company (WIC), the company's equivalent to this office being the bookkeeper-general.
