= Fort Elize Carthago =

Fort built by the Dutch West India Company

- Part of Dutch Gold Coast
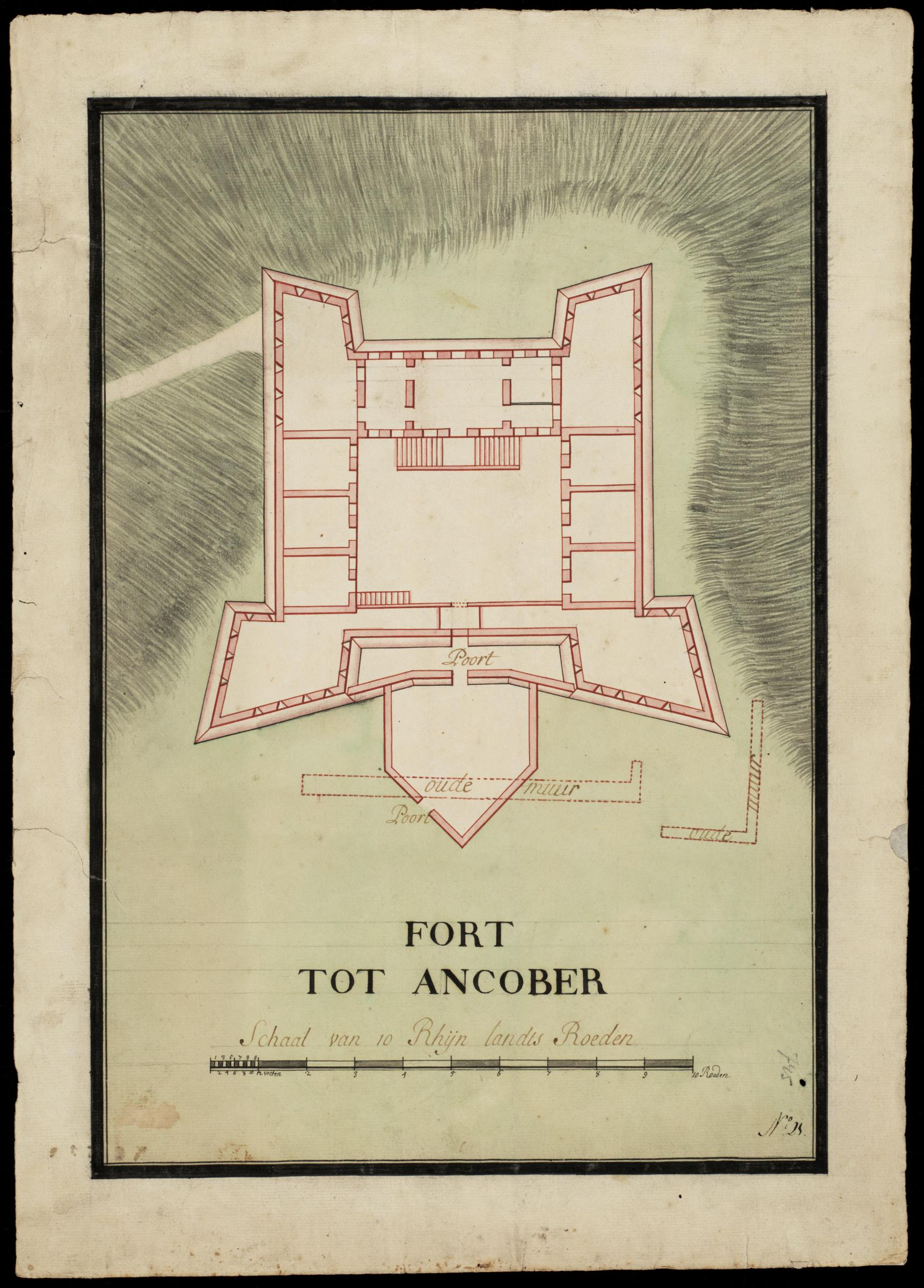
- Fort Elize Carthago

Location
- Coordinates: 4.895°N 2.268°W

Site history
- Built: 1703

Garrison information
- Occupants: Netherlands (1703–1711)

Fort Elize Carthago was a fort built by the Dutch West India Company in 1702 on a hill at the mouth of the Ankobra River, near the base of the Dutch on the Western Gold Coast, Fort Saint Anthony. Today, only ruins of the former fort can be found. The ruins are easily accessible by a pathway from the Ankobra Beach Hotel and are frequented by tourists who enjoy the panoramic view of the site.

== History ==
In the 17th century, the Ankobra River was an important means of transport for the gold trade in the area. Between the 1650s and 1680s, the Dutch levied a toll from people using the Ankobra River at its mouth from a stone toll house, but abandoned it after Dutch influence in the area diminished and locals refused to pay the toll any longer. However, by the turn of the 18th century, French interest in the Ankobra River area made the Dutch take a renewed interest in the area, and after receiving a request from the local Azane people, the Dutch West India Company decided to build a lodge on the hill at the mouth of the Ankobra River.

The trade at this lodge was so promising that in 1706, the company decided to extend it into a fort. Shortly thereafter, a conflict emerged between the Azane and other peoples at the coast, which eventually led to the abandonment of the fort by the Dutch in 1711. The fort was subsequently destroyed by John Conny in 1712.

Archaeological excavations were done at the site of the fort in 1999 and the fall of 2011.
