= Fort Witsen =

Destroyed Fort on Dutch Gold Coast (contemporary Ghana)

- Part of Dutch Gold Coast
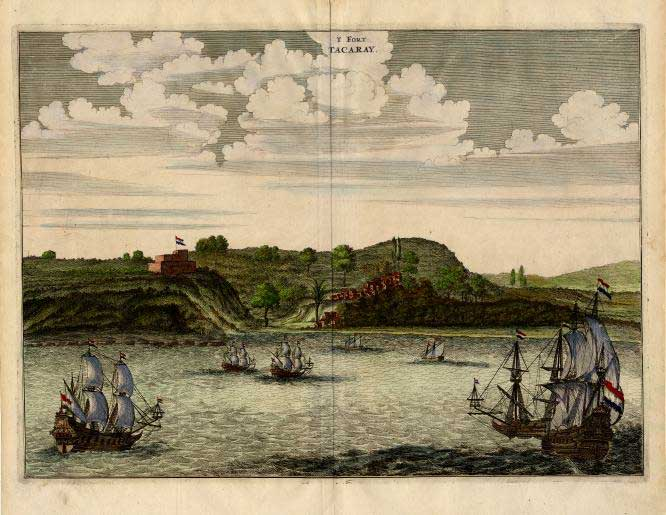
- Fort Witsen around 1668

Location
- Coordinates: 4.916688°N 1.749916°W

Site history
- Built: 1665

Garrison information
- Occupants: Netherlands (1665-1872)

Fort Witsen, also Fort Tacaray, was a fort on the Dutch Gold Coast, established in 1665 near Takoradi. This fort was destroyed after a few years, and in 1684 the site was abandoned. A map from 1791 shows, however, that the Dutch had renewed their presence in the fort again. The fort was handed over to Britain, along with the entire Dutch Gold Coast, on 6 April 1872, owing to the provisions of the Anglo-Dutch Treaties of 1870-1871.
