= Saglemi housing project =

Housing project in Ghana

Saglemi Housing Project (now known as the Saglemi City) was a public housing now developed and managed privately by LMI HOMES LTD project located in Prampram in the Ningo Prampram District in the Greater Accra Region of Ghana. The Ghana Home Loans Company were to provide mortgage arrangements for the housing units to be sold to employees.

== History ==
The project was begun in 2012 by the National Democratic Congress to ease the accommodation deficit in Ghana. The project was funded by Credit Suisse following a Parliament of Ghana approval, granted on 13 October 2012. On 4 January 2013, the Ministry of Finance, who was the borrower and the lender, signed a facility agreement for the release of $200 million to fund the construction of the 5,000 housing units. Collins Dauda, who was the then minister for Water Resources, Works and Housing, signed the Engineering Procurement and Construction Agreement with Construtora OAS Ghana Limited, represented by Clocanas. The minister further disclosed that the sale had become necessary after actively engaging the cabinet, the Ministry of Finance, the Office of the Attorney-General and the Ministry of Justice on the completion of the project. The Saglemi housing project is not going to be affordable according to Fatimatu Aubakari, the deputy minister for information.

== Construction ==
The facility sits on a 2100-acre land and was meant to be a 5,000-residential unit building. It has one to three-bedroom flats for persons who earn low income. The agreement signed by the government stated it would be done in four phases.

Phase One saw the building of 180 blocks comprising over 1,500 flats.

== Controversy ==
The project became a matter of controversy after the New Patriotic Party took power after years of abandonment. Samuel Atta Akyea said the agreement was botched following acts of embezzlement by former NDC government officials. Out of the 5,000 proposed housing units, only 668 were completed. The attorney general claimed the completed houses were not habitable and added that the project at the site was currently worth $64 million even though it was stated about $196 million had been spent.

Collins Dauda; Agyeman-Mensah, the chief director at the ministry from 2009 to 2017; Alhaji Ziblim Yakubu, former chief director at the Ministry for Water Resources, Works and Housing and also the executive chairman of Construtora OAS, the Brazilian company which constructed the affordable housing project at Saglemi; Andrew Clocanas; and a director of RMS, the Engineering, Procurement and Construction (EPC) consultancy subcontractor, Nouvi Tetteh Angelo faced 52 counts of criminal charges and were accused for willfully causing financial loss to the state.

== Continuation ==
Francis Asenso-Boakye claimed the project would be completed after the ministry tasked the Ghana Institution of Surveyors to conduct a cost and technical audit of the agreement.

On 18 October 2024, the government selected Quarm-LMI as the preferred developer to complete the long-stalled Saglemi Housing Project.

On 22 October 2024, John Mahama promised to review the handing over of the project to Quarm-LMI.

On 11th March 2026, The NDC government signed the JV agreement with QUARM-LMI paving way for the continuation of works on the project by the private developer.
