= Fort Victoria =

Fort Victoria may refer to:

- Fort Victoria, Alberta, Canada
- Fort Victoria (British Columbia), Canada
- Fort Victoria (Isle of Wight), England
- Fort Victoria, Bermuda, a now disused British Army fort
- Fort Victoria, Cape Coast, Ghana
- Masvingo, Zimbabwe, named Fort Victoria until 1982
- Fort Victoria, a gun emplacement on Mount Victoria, Auckland, New Zealand during the late 19th century
- Fort Victoria, capital of the Dutch Governorate of Ambon
- In the 19th century Bankot fort, near Suvarnadurg, was known for a time as Fort Victoria.

== See also ==
- RFA Fort Victoria (A387), a 1990 Royal Fleet Auxiliary ship
- RMS Fort Victoria, a Furness Withy ship
