= List of castles in Ghana =

Fortified colonial trading posts in Ghana

Forts and Castles, Volta, Greater Accra, Central and Western Regions
UNESCO World Heritage Site
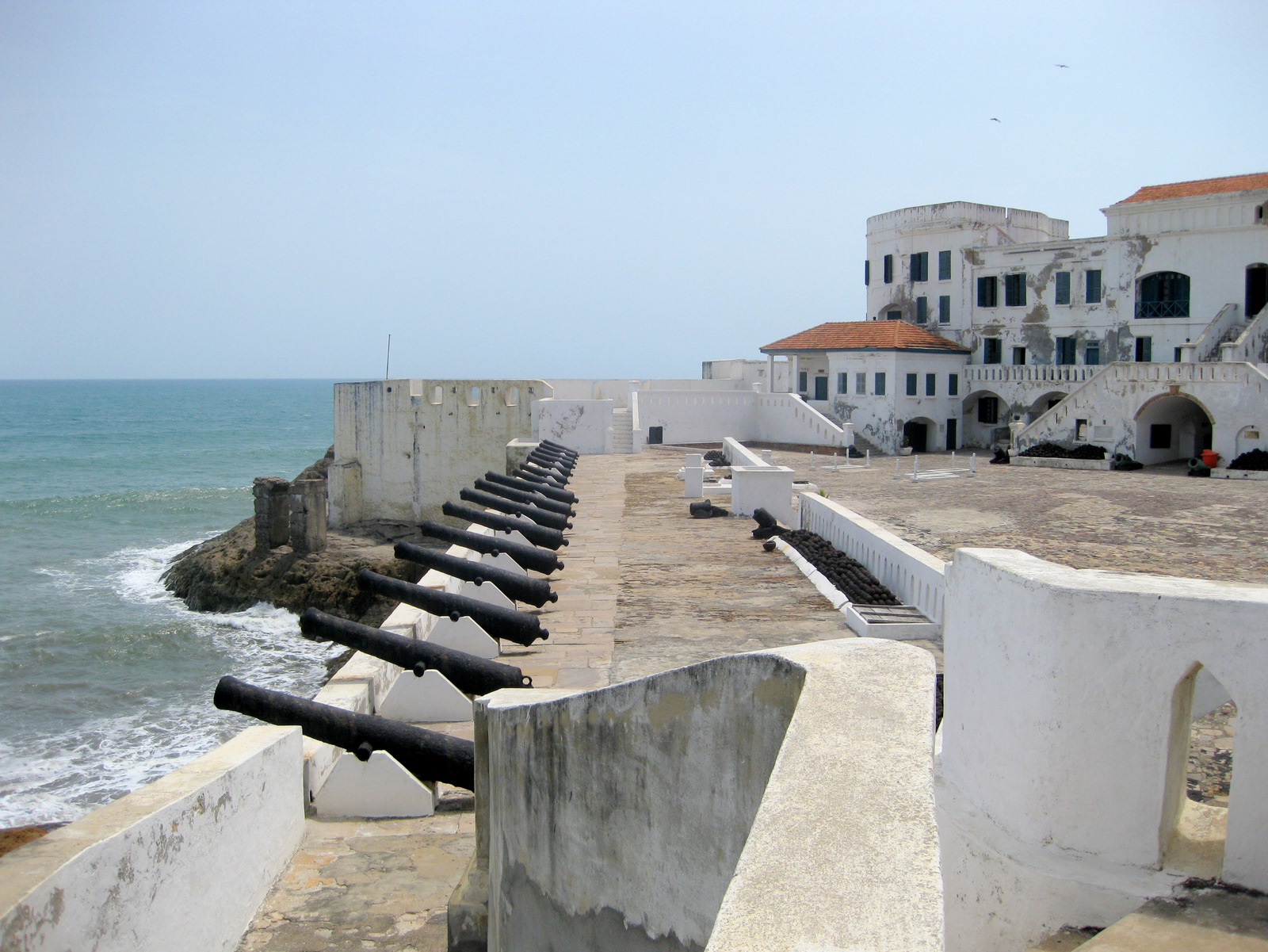
- Cape Coast Castle
- Location: Ghana
- Includes: 1. Fort Good Hope (Fort Goedehoop); 2. Cape Coast Castle; 3. Fort Patience (Fort Leysaemhyt); 4. Fort Amsterdam; 5. Fort St. Jago (Fort Conraadsburg); 6. Fort Batenstein; 7. Fort San Sebastian; 8. Fort Metal Cross; 9. English Fort (Fort Vredenburg); 10. Fort Saint Antony; 11. Elmina Castle (St. George's Castle / Fort St. Jorge)
- Criteria: Cultural: (vi)
- Reference: 34
- Inscription: 1979 (3rd Session)

During the colonial period in Ghana, at the time known as the Gold Coast, roughly corresponding to the 15th through 19th centuries, European-style coastal forts and castles were built, mostly by the Portuguese, Dutch and British. These forts linked the trading routes established by the Portuguese and acted as important market places for the gold and slave trades.

Because of their testimony to precolonial and colonial Afro-European commerce, including the Atlantic slave trade, and their profound effect on the history of West Africa, a number of these fortifications and outposts were designated as a World Heritage Site by UNESCO in 1979.

Kumasi Fort in the Ashanti Region was originally built by an Asante king in imitation of these colonial forts.

== Coastal regions ==
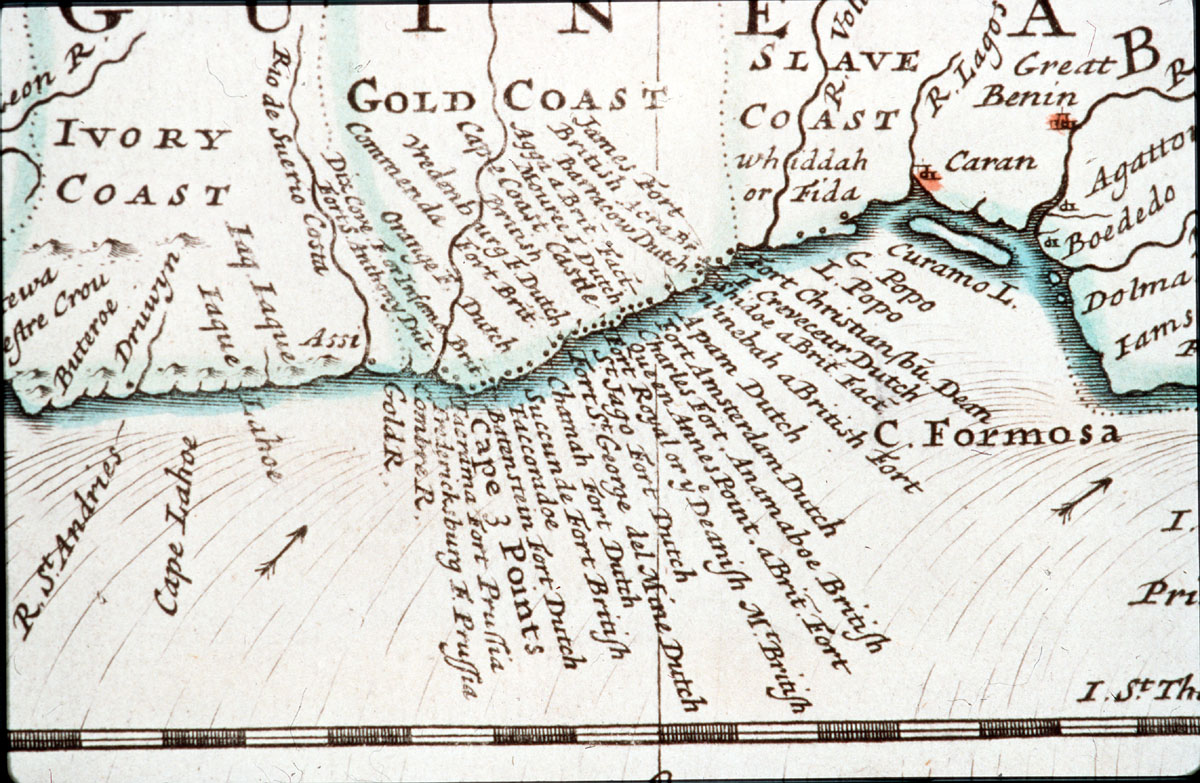
A map of the Gold Coast circa 1700

=== World Heritage listed forts ===
Forts and Castles, Volta, Greater Accra, Central and Western Regions is the collective designation by UNESCO of European-style fortifications and outposts (mostly Portuguese, Dutch and British) along the Gold Coast (modern-day Ghana) during the colonial period. The term specifically applies to a number of such fortifications designated as a World Heritage Site by UNESCO in 1979, including:

- Three castles:
  - Cape Coast at Cape Coast
  - St. George's d’Elmina at Elmina
  - Christiansborg at Osu, Accra
- Fifteen forts:
  - Good Hope at Senya Beraku
  - Patience at Apam
  - Amsterdam at Abandze
  - St. Jago at Elmina
  - San Sebastian at Shama
  - Metal Cross at Dixcove
  - St. Anthony at Axim
  - Orange at Sekondi
  - Fort Groß Friedrichsburg at Prince's Town
  - William (Lighthouse) at Cape Coast
  - William at Anomabu
  - Victoria at Cape Coast
  - Ussher at Usshertown, Accra
  - James at Jamestown, Accra
  - Apollonia at Beyin
- Four forts partially in ruins:
  - Amsterdam at Abandze (Note, this fort is listed both as fort and as fort partially in ruins by UNESCO)
  - English Fort at British Komenda
  - Batenstein at Butre;
  - Prinzensten at Keta
- Ruins with visible structures:
  - Nassau at Mouri
  - Fredensborg at Old Ningo
  - Vredenburg at Dutch Komenda
  - Vernon at Prampram
  - Dorothea at Akwidaa
- Two sites with traces of former fortifications:
  - Frederiksborg at Amanful, Cape Coast
  - Fort Augustaborg at Teshie

==== Gallery ====
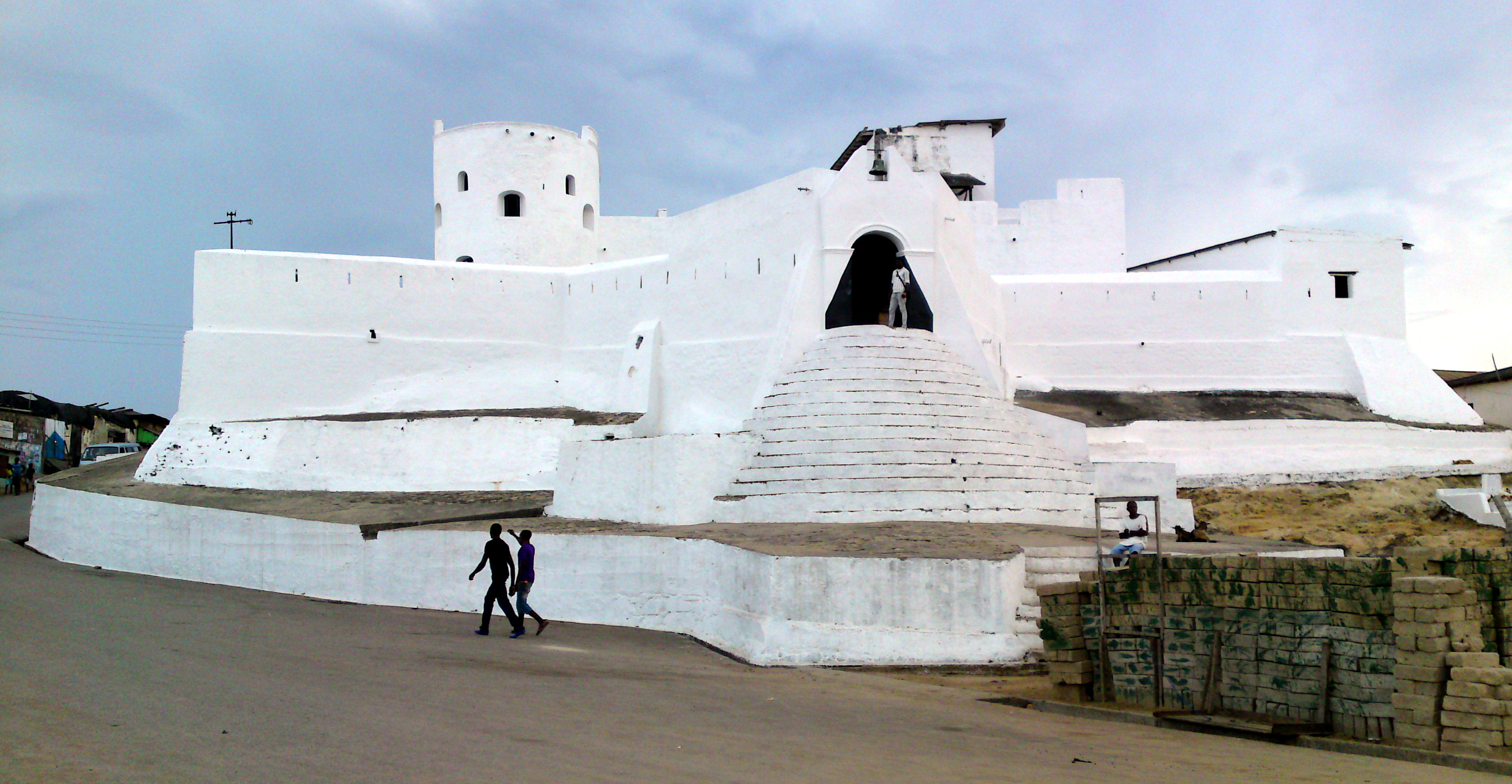
Fort São Sebastião de Xama

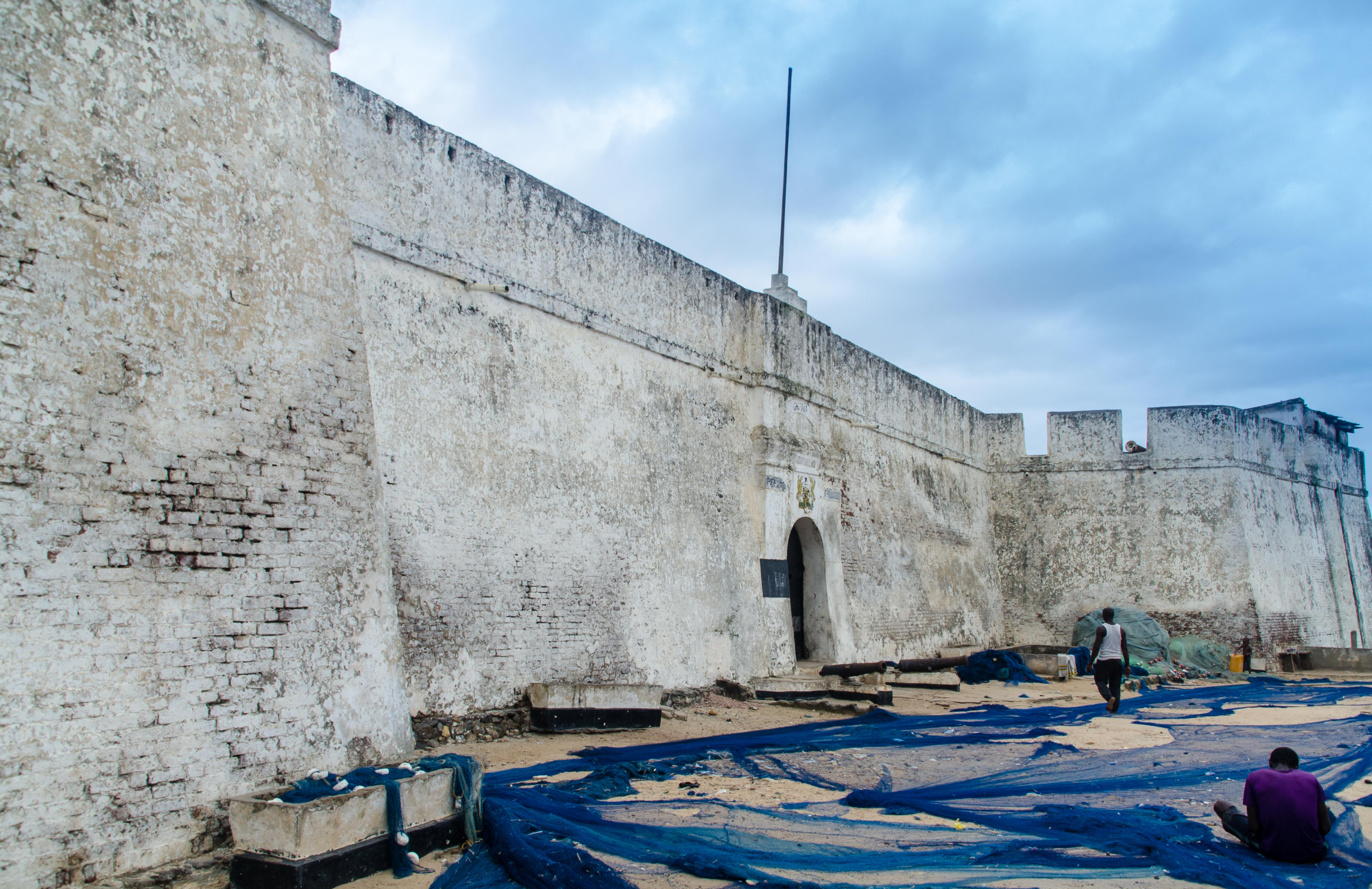
Fort William

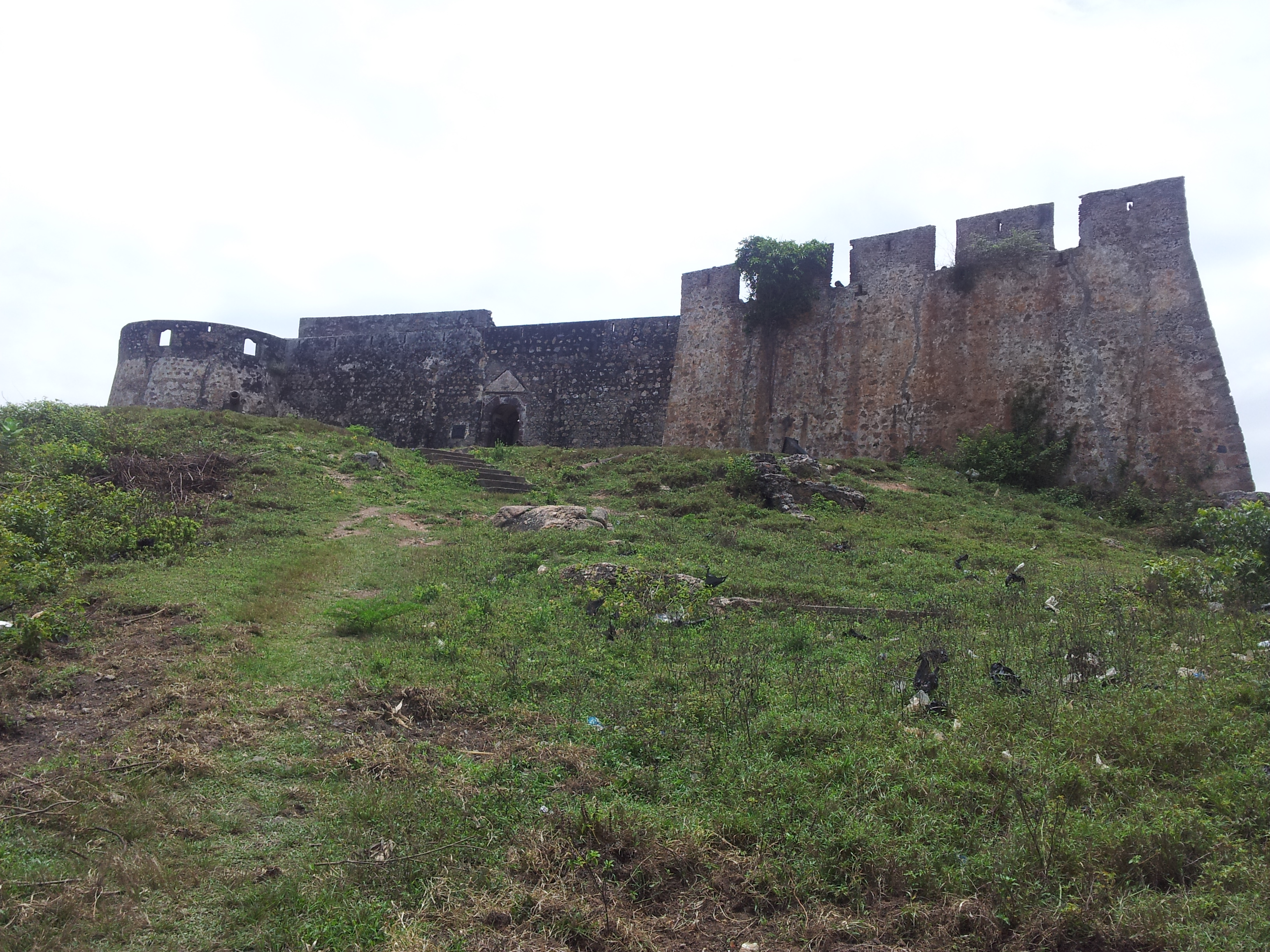
Fort Amsterdam (Ghana)

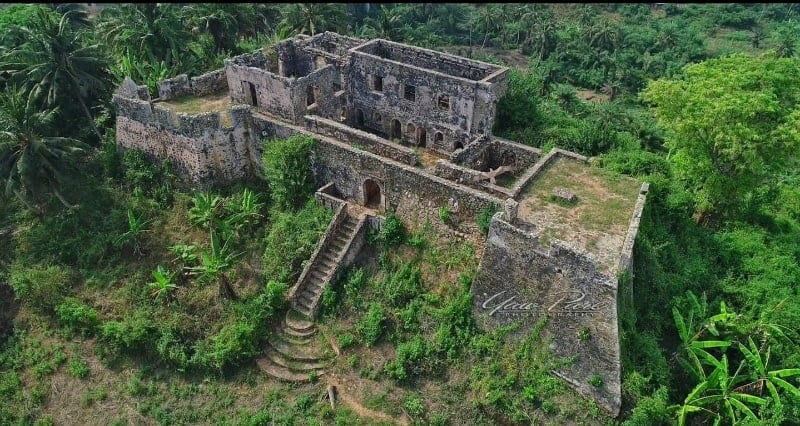
Fort Batenstein

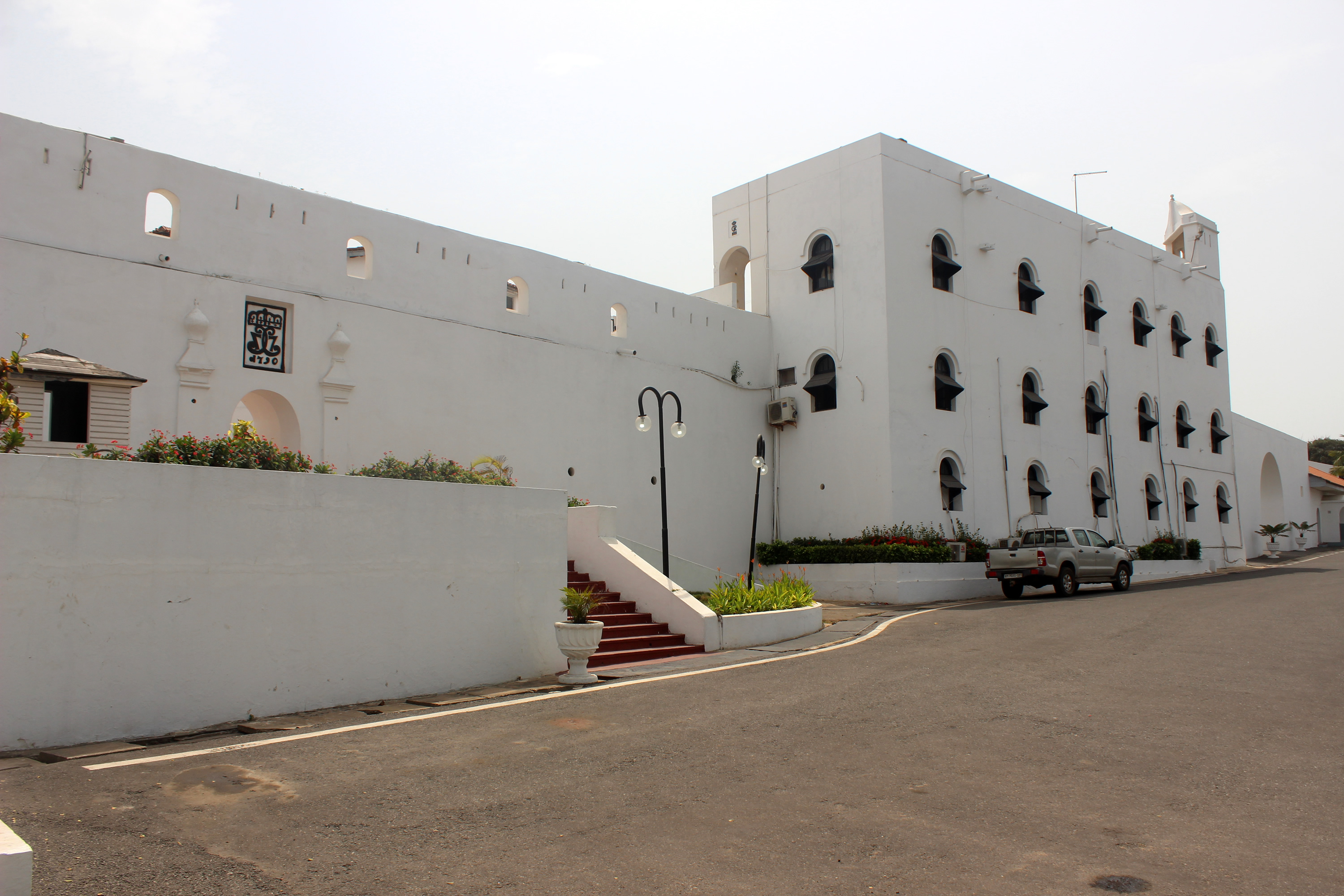
Fort Christiansborg

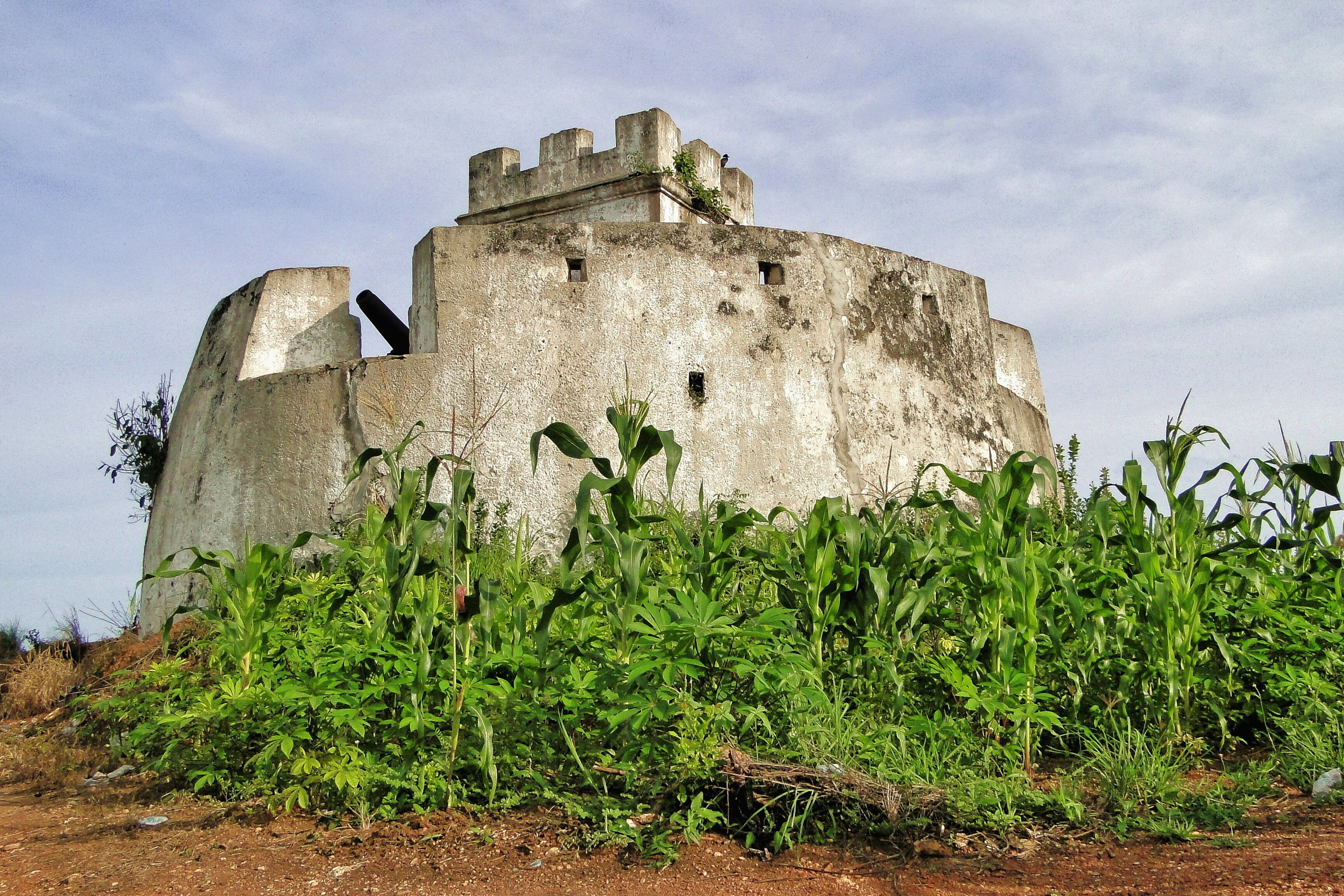
Fort Victoria, Cape Coast

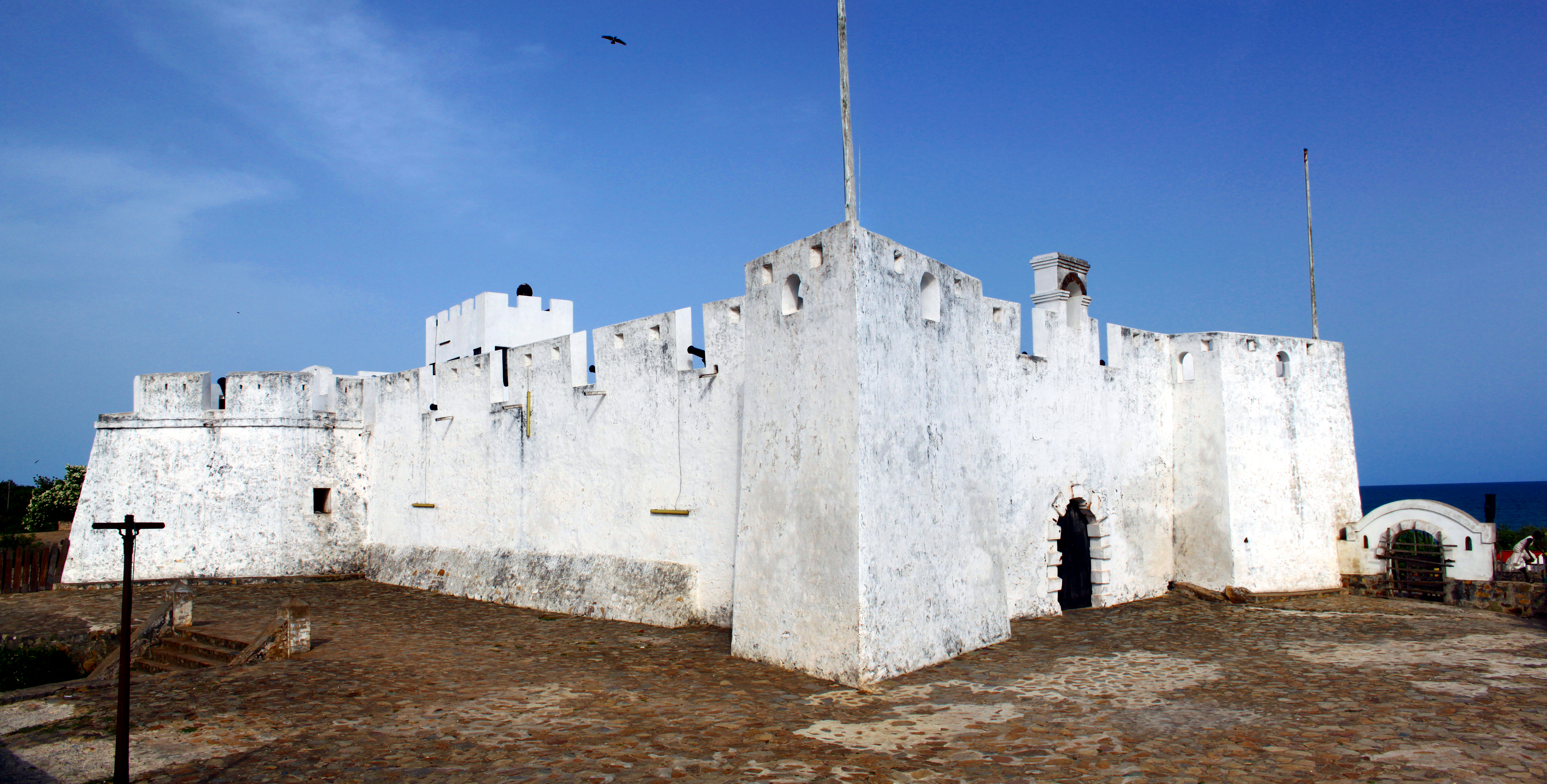
Fort Metal Cross

=== Other coastal forts ===
Other coastal forts included in Ghana's material cultural heritage list of the Ghana Museums and Monuments Board:

- Fort Fredericksburg at Amanful (distinguished from Fort Frederiksborg/Fort Royal near Cape Coast Castle)
- Fort McCarthy at Cape Coast
- The Little Fort at Anomabu
- Fort Tantumquery at Otuam

Not listed as heritage (mostly largely destroyed or otherwise lost):

- Fort Winneba at Winneba
- Fort Sekondi at Sekondi
- Fort Kongenstein at Ada
- Fort Elize Carthago near Axim
- Fort Ruychaver on the banks of the Ankobra River
- Fort Witsen near Sekondi

Regions of Ghana

By region (from East to West):

- Volta Region:
  - Fort Prinzenstein, Keta (5°55′18″N 0°59′37″E)
- Greater Accra Region:
  - Fort Fredensborg, Old Ningo (5°45′04″N 0°11′01″E)
  - Fort Vernon, Prampram (5°43′31″N 0°07′00″E)
  - Fort Augustaborg, Teshie (5°35′00″N 0°06′00″W)
  - Osu Castle (Christiansborg), Accra (5°32′49″N 0°10′57″W)
  - Ussher Fort, Accra (5°32′19″N 0°12′30″W)
  - Fort James, Accra (5°32′01″N 0°12′40″W)
- Central Region:
  - Fort Good Hope (Fort Goede Hoop), Senya Beraku (5°23′15″N 0°29′23″W)
  - Fort Lijdzaamheid ('Patience'), Apam (5°17′10″N 0°43′41″W)
  - Fort Amsterdam, Abandze (5°11′32″N 1°05′35″W)
  - Fort William, Anomabu (5°10′27″N 1°07′08″W)
  - Fort Nassau, Moree (5°08′00″N 1°12′00″W)
  - Cape Coast Castle, Cape Coast (5°06′12″N 1°14′33″W)
  - Fort William (Lighthouse), Cape Coast (5°06′29″N 1°14′39″W)
  - Fort Victoria, Cape Coast (5°06′24″N 1°14′57″W)
  - Elmina Castle, Elmina (5°04′57″N 1°20′53″W)
  - Fort Coenraadsburg, Elmina (5°05′04″N 1°21′03″W)
  - Fort Vredenburgh, Komenda (5°03′06″N 1°29′01″W)
  - English Fort, Komenda (5°03′00″N 1°29′22″W)
- Western Region:
  - Fort San Sebastian, Shama (5°00′39″N 1°37′45″W)
  - Fort Orange, Sekondi (4°56′09″N 1°42′26″W)
  - Fort Batenstein, Butri (4°49′37″N 1°55′17″W)
  - Fort Metal Cross, Dixcove (4°47′36″N 1°56′42″W)
  - Fort Groß Friedrichsburg, Prince's Town (4°47′28″N 2°08′02″W)
  - Fort Santo Antonio, Axim (4°52′05″N 2°14′40″W)
  - Fort Apollonia, Beyin (4°59′15″N 2°35′25″W)

== Other regions ==
- Kumasi Fort in the Ashanti Region.

== See also ==
- List of castles in Africa
