= Kofi Adumua Bossman =

Ghanaian politician and jurist (1907–1967)

Kofi Adumoah Bossman

Supreme Court Judge
- In office 1964–1966
- Nominated by: Kwame Nkrumah

Personal details
- Born: 27 March 1907 Prampram, Gold Coast
- Died: 1967 (aged 59–60)
- Spouse(s): Motilewa Akiwumi, (m. 1930)
- Children: 1
- Education: University of London
- Occupation: Jurist

Kofi Adumua Bossman (27 March 1907 – 1967) was a Ghanaian barrister, a jurist and a politician. He was a prominent legal practitioner based in Accra in the 1940s and 1950s prior to being called to the bench. He was a Supreme Court Judge during the first republic. He was dismissed in 1964. In 1966 he was appointed as a member of the constitutional commission during the National Liberation Council (NLC) regime.

== Early life and education ==
Bossman was born on 27 March 1907 at Prampram, Greater Accra Region, Ghana (then Gold Coast).

He began schooling at Wesleyan Infant Junior School in Prampram. He continued at Wesleyan Boys' School in Accra from 1913 to1916 and East Anglian School for Boys in Bury St Edmunds, Suffolk, England, from 1920 to 1923. He had his tertiary education at King's College, University of London from 1924 to 1928 where he was admitted as Edward Kofi Bossman. He enrolled as a student of Lincoln's Inn in 1924 and was called to the degree of "utter barrister" in 1928.

== Career ==
Upon his return to the Gold Coast, he began private legal practice in Accra at Kojo Thompson's chambers. In 1929, Bossman was a founding member of the Gold Coast Youth Conference and served as the first secretary of the group.

He was a member of the Coussey Committee on constitutional reform from 1948 to 1949.

He once served as a general secretary of the Gold Coast Bar Association and in July 1955, he represented the association at the Commonwealth and Empire Law Conference in London.

On 2 July 1956 he was called to the bench as a high court judge straight from the bar, and in 1962 he became a Supreme Court Judge.

In January 1964, the then president Kwame Nkrumah held a referendum that gave him power to dismiss Supreme Court Judges and High Court Judges. On 2 March 1964, Bossman together with Edward Akufo-Addo and Robert Samuel Blay were dismissed and their appointments revoked by the then president Kwame Nkrumah. In 1966, Bossman was appointed member of the constitutional commission. He died in 1967 while still a member of the commission.

While a private legal practitioner, Bossman went into politics. He was a member of the Mambii Party. On 25 February 1942, he contested a seat during the town council elections and won. He was later a member and general secretary of the National Democratic Party. He contested for a seat in Accra in the 1951 elections but lost. The party was later merged with the United Gold Coast Convention to form the Congress Party in 1952.

== Personal life ==
He married Motilewa Akiwumi in December 1930. He is the father of W. A. N. Bossman, a lawyer and formerly president of the Ghana Bar Association.

== See also ==
- List of judges of the Supreme Court of Ghana
- Supreme Court of Ghana
