= Fort Victoria, Cape Coast =

Military structure in Ghana

Coordinates: 5°06′24″N 1°14′57″W

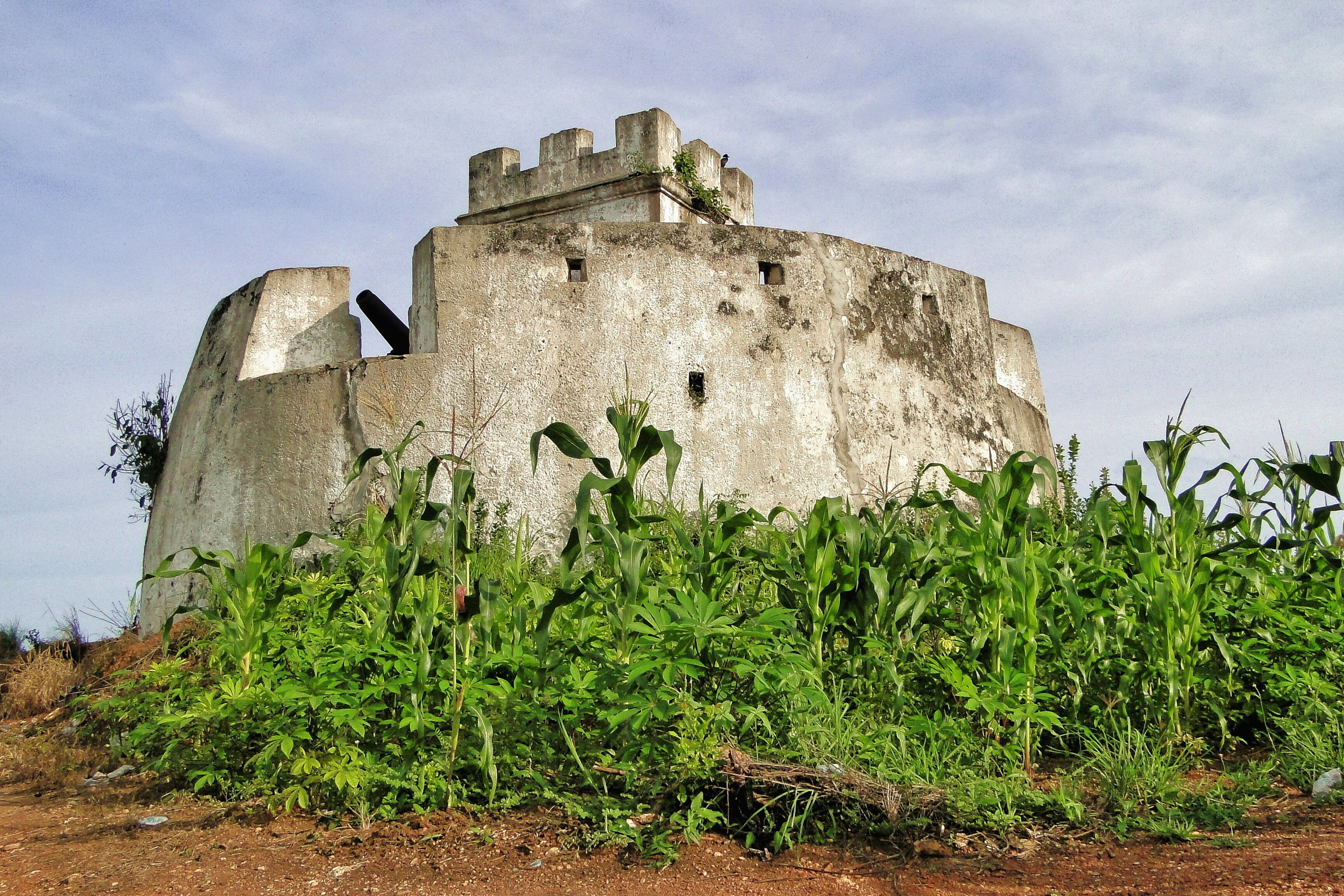

Fort Victoria is a structure in Cape Coast, Ghana. It was initially known as 'Phipps Tower', in honour of its initial constructor English Governor Phipps. Its name was changed later to Fort Victoria in honor of Queen Victoria. Along with other nearby forts and castles, Fort Victoria was inscribed on the UNESCO World Heritage List in 1979 because of its European colonial significance.

== History ==
It is situated in the western part of the Cape Coast Township and was built in 1821 on the site of an earlier fort named after its builder, Governor James Phipps.

Fort Victoria served as an outlook post for signaling purposes and to fend off attacks.

It can be viewed from Fort William because of their close proximity.

== Current state ==
The fort is in good condition and has been maintained as a national monument. It is one of the tourist sites in Ghana.

== Entrance Fees ==
Fort's opening hours are 9:00am-4:30pm and the entrance fees are as follows:

Pupils from Primary to JHS 3 GH¢ 0.50

SHS Students GH¢ 1.00

Tertiary Students with ID GH¢ 2.00

Ghanaian Adults GH¢ 5.00

Foreign Children USD 2.00 or its equivalent in Ghana cedis

Foreign Students with ID USD 7.00 or its equivalent in Ghana cedis

Adult Foreigners USD 10.00 or its equivalent in Ghana cedis

*Entrance fees were reviewed in February 2013
