= Fort Vernon =

Military structure in Ghana

- Part of Dutch Gold Coast
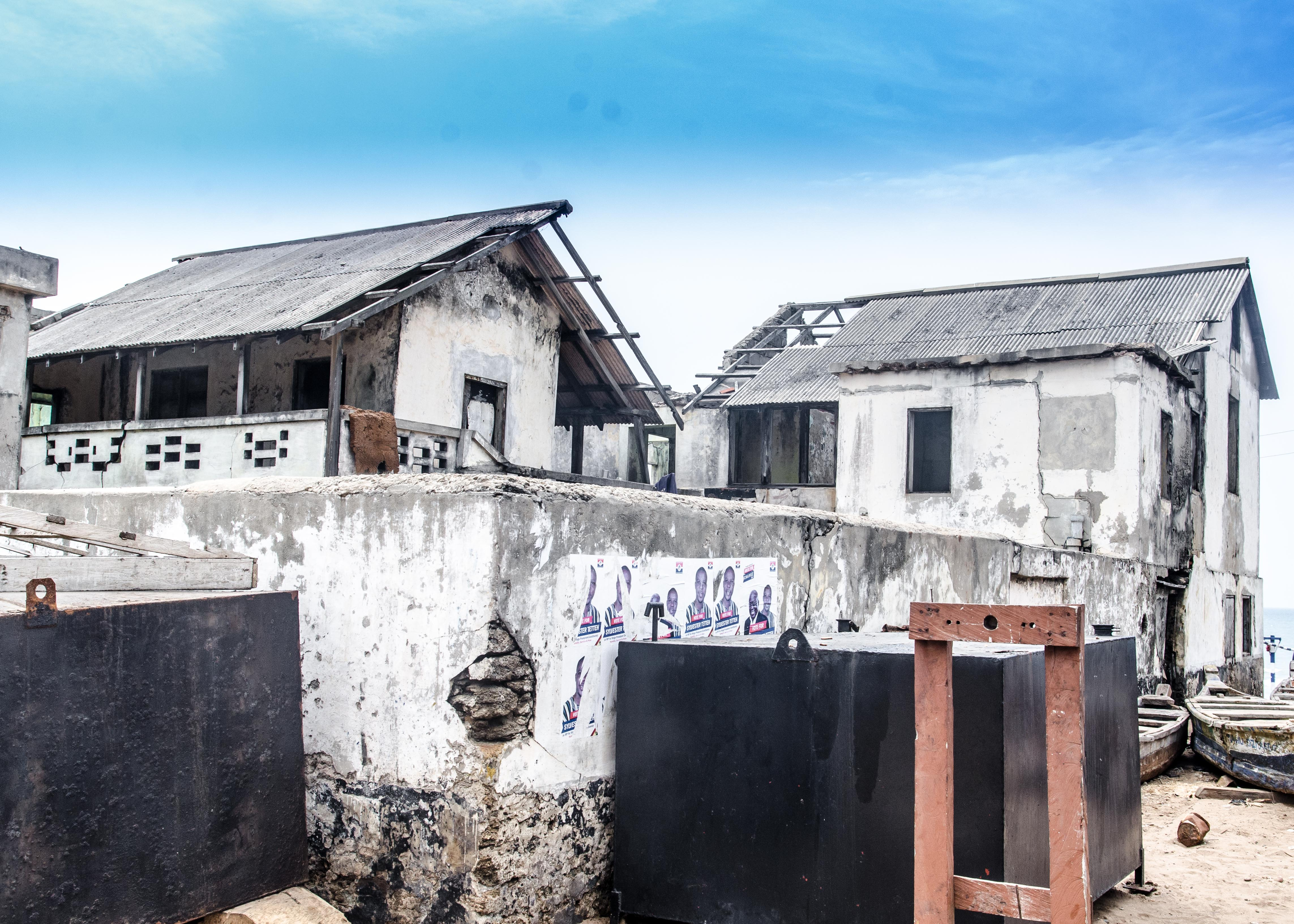
- Fort Vernon

Site history
- Built: 1742
- Materials: rough stones and swish

Garrison information
- Occupants: British (1742-1816)

UNESCO World Heritage Site
- Part of: Forts and Castles, Volta, Greater Accra, Central and Western Regions
- Criteria: Cultural: (vi)
- Reference: 34-005
- Inscription: 1979 (3rd Session)

Fort Vernon was a military structure designed to facilitate the Atlantic slave trade. The Royal African Company built the fort in 1742 near Prampram, a town in the Greater Accra Region of Ghana. It was built out of cheap materials – rough stones and swish. The Danes destroyed the fort before 1783. The British rebuilt it in 1806, but it soon started to collapse and was abandoned in about 1816. It was re-occupied by the British in 1831 but was again abandoned in 1844. It subsequently became ruins. Because of its importance during the slave trade and its testimony to European economic and colonial influence in West Africa, the fort was inscribed on the UNESCO World Heritage List in 1979, along with several other forts and castles in Ghana.

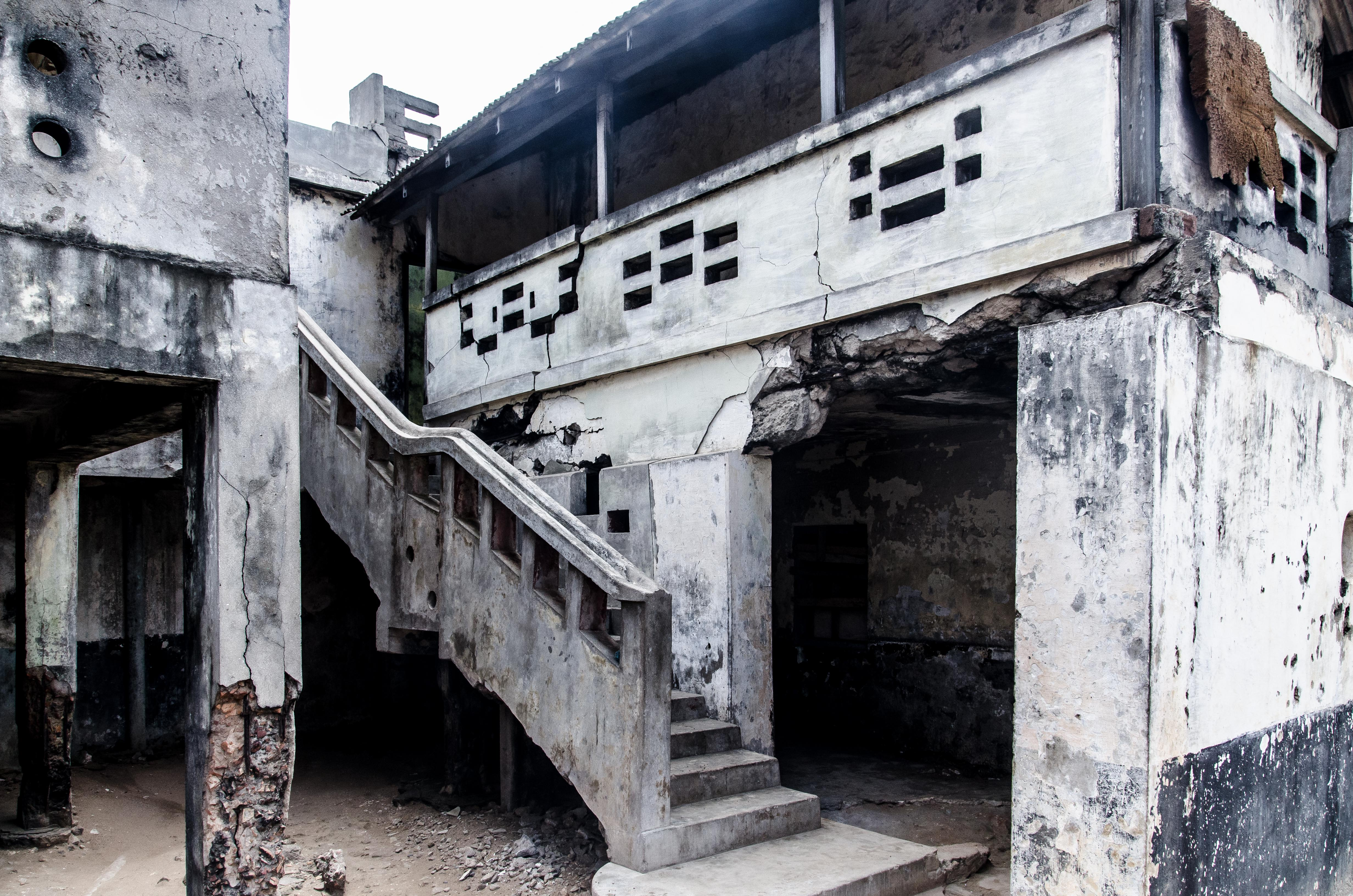
Ruins of Fort Vernon

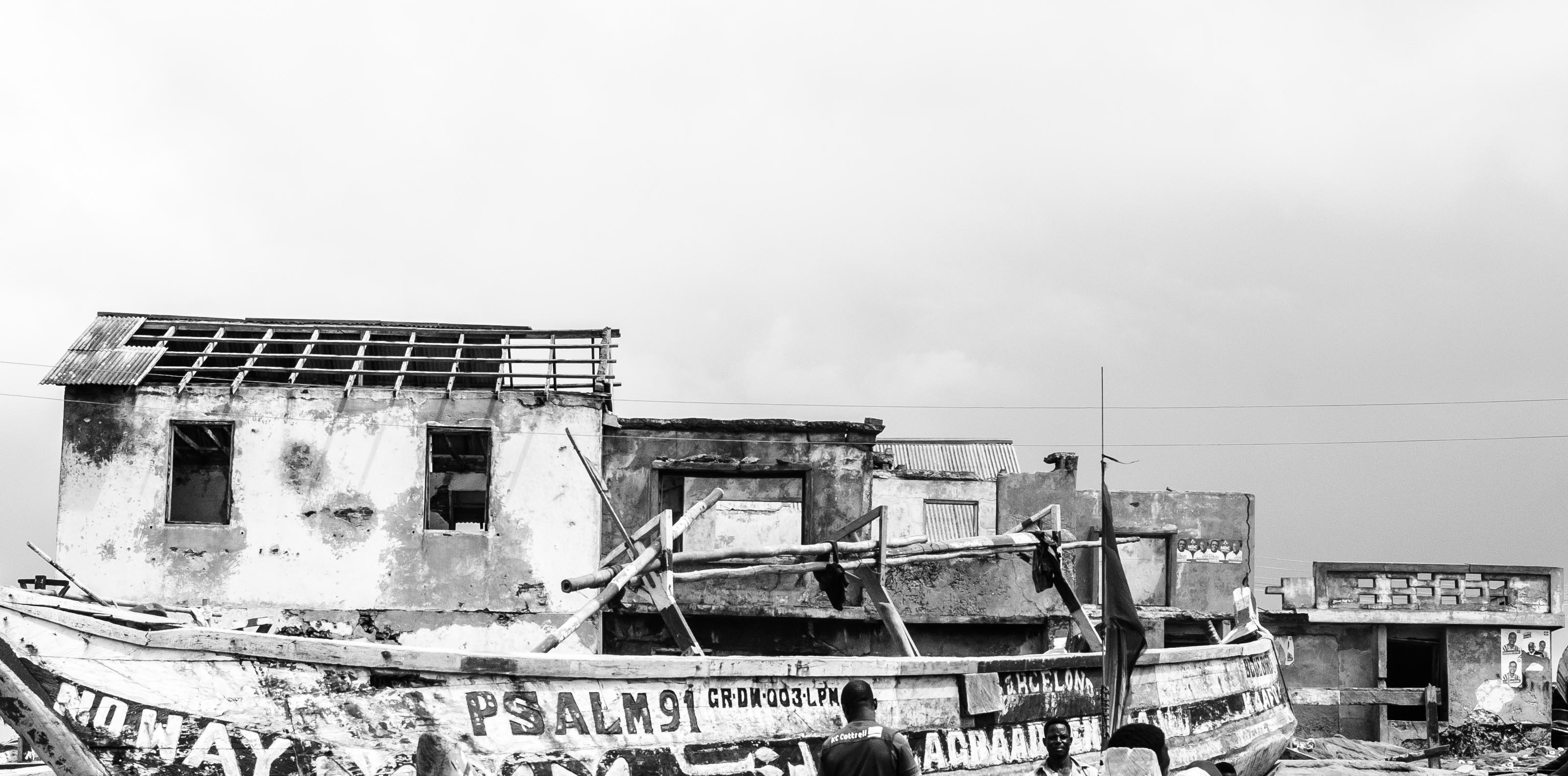
Remains of Fort Vernon, Back view
