= Fort Goede Hoop, Ghana =

Fort Goede Hoop
- Fort de Goede Hoop
- Senya Beraku, Central Region, Ghana in Ghana
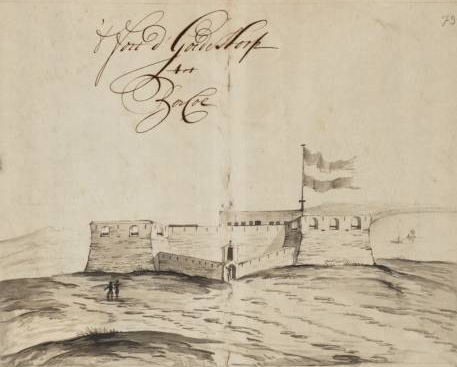
- Fort Goede Hoop in 1709

Site information
- Type: Coastal fort
- Owner: Ghana Museums & Monuments Board
- Controlled by: Netherlands (1667–1868)
- Open to the public: Yes
- Condition: Preserved / repurposed

Location
- Coordinates: 5.3874°N 0.4898°W
- Height: Approx. 12 m

Site history
- Built: 1667
- Built by: Dutch West India Company
- In use: 1667–1868
- Materials: Stone, brick
- Battles/wars: Captured by Britain, 1782–1785

Garrison information
- Occupants: Netherlands (1667–1868)

UNESCO World Heritage Site
- Part of: Forts and Castles, Volta, Greater Accra, Central and Western Regions
- Criteria: Cultural: (vi)
- Reference: 34
- Inscription: 1979 (3rd Session)

Fort de Goede Hoop (English: Fort Good Hope) is a historic Dutch fort located in Senya Beraku, Central Region, Ghana. Established in 1667, it was the last fort built by the Dutch on the Gold Coast and played a role in the gold and slave trade.

It is part of the Forts and Castles of Ghana UNESCO World Heritage List site, inscribed in 1979 due to its role in European colonial trade and the Atlantic slave trade.

== History ==
The Dutch initially established a lodge at Senya Beraku in the 1660s, but it was abandoned after the British built a fort at nearby Winneba. In 1704, the Dutch requested and received permission from the Queen of Agona to construct a fort at Senya Beraku, primarily for the gold trade with Akim.

The original fort was triangular, known as Fort de Goede Hoop. By 1715 it was expanded into a rectangular fort with four bastions and a slave prison in the southwest bastion. An outer defensive wall was added in the late 18th century.

In 1782, during the Fourth Anglo-Dutch War, British Captain Thomas Shirley captured Fort Goede Hoop along with several other Dutch forts on the Gold Coast. The fort remained under temporary British occupation until 1785. Between 1811 and 1816, the local Akim people briefly controlled the fort before it returned to Dutch administration. In 1868, it was ceded to the United Kingdom under the Anglo-Dutch Gold Coast Treaty (1867).

== Physical features ==
Initially, the Dutch built a small triangular fort on the promontory that is located near a cove because of the proximity to a good landing beach. The triangular fort has three bastions located at the northeast, southwest, and southeast corners.

In the year 1724, due to the limited size of the fort that could not cope with the increasing number of slaves, it was rebuilt into its present rectangular shape. It had four bastions with curtain walls, garrisons and halls for officers, kitchens, a female and male prison, stores, a granary, and a powder magazine room. An outer wall was also built later on, but the wall has almost disappeared.

The fort presently serves as a rest house and also a tourist attraction site.

== Gallery ==
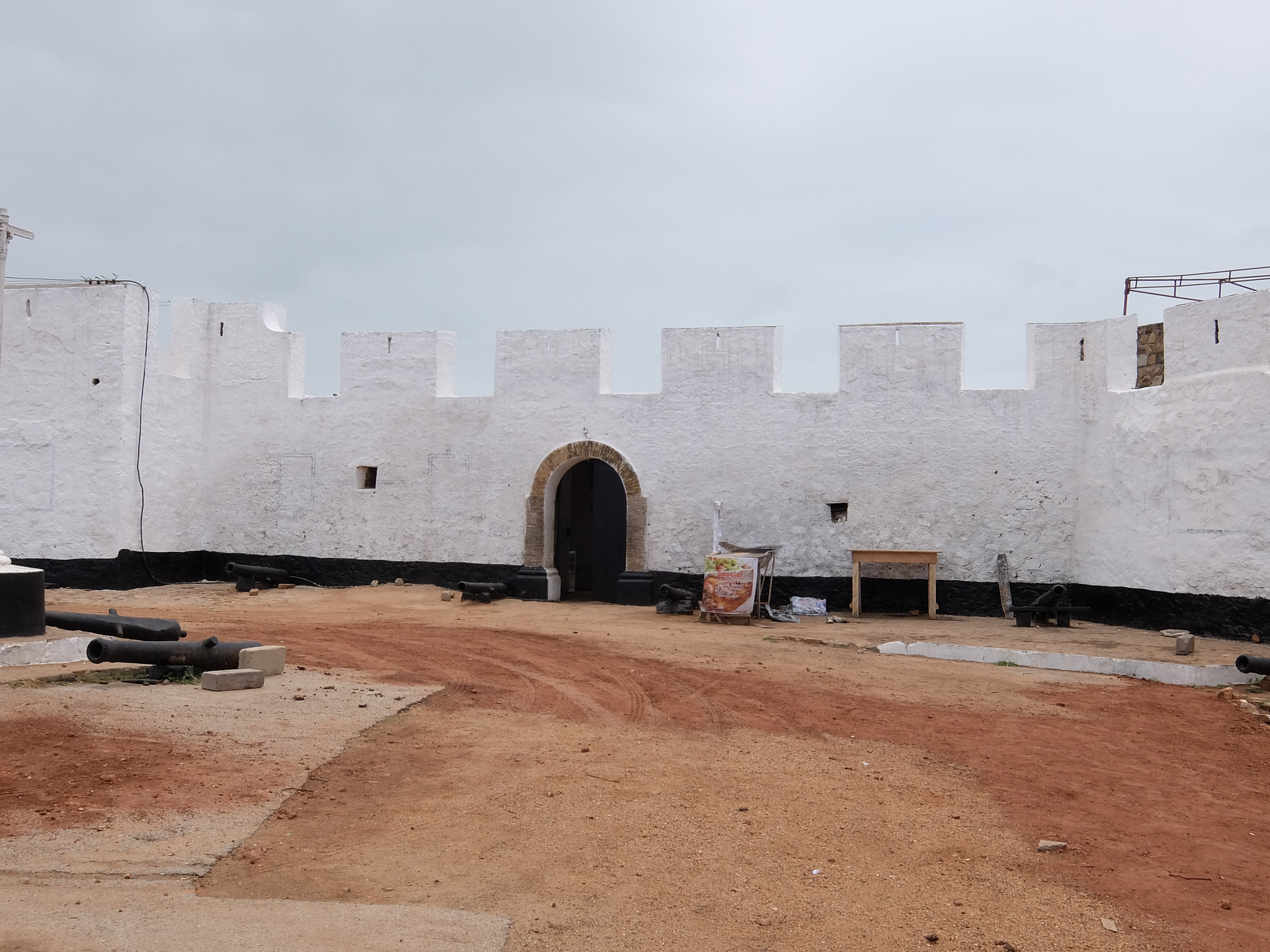
The entrance to Fort de Goede Hoop (Good Hope)

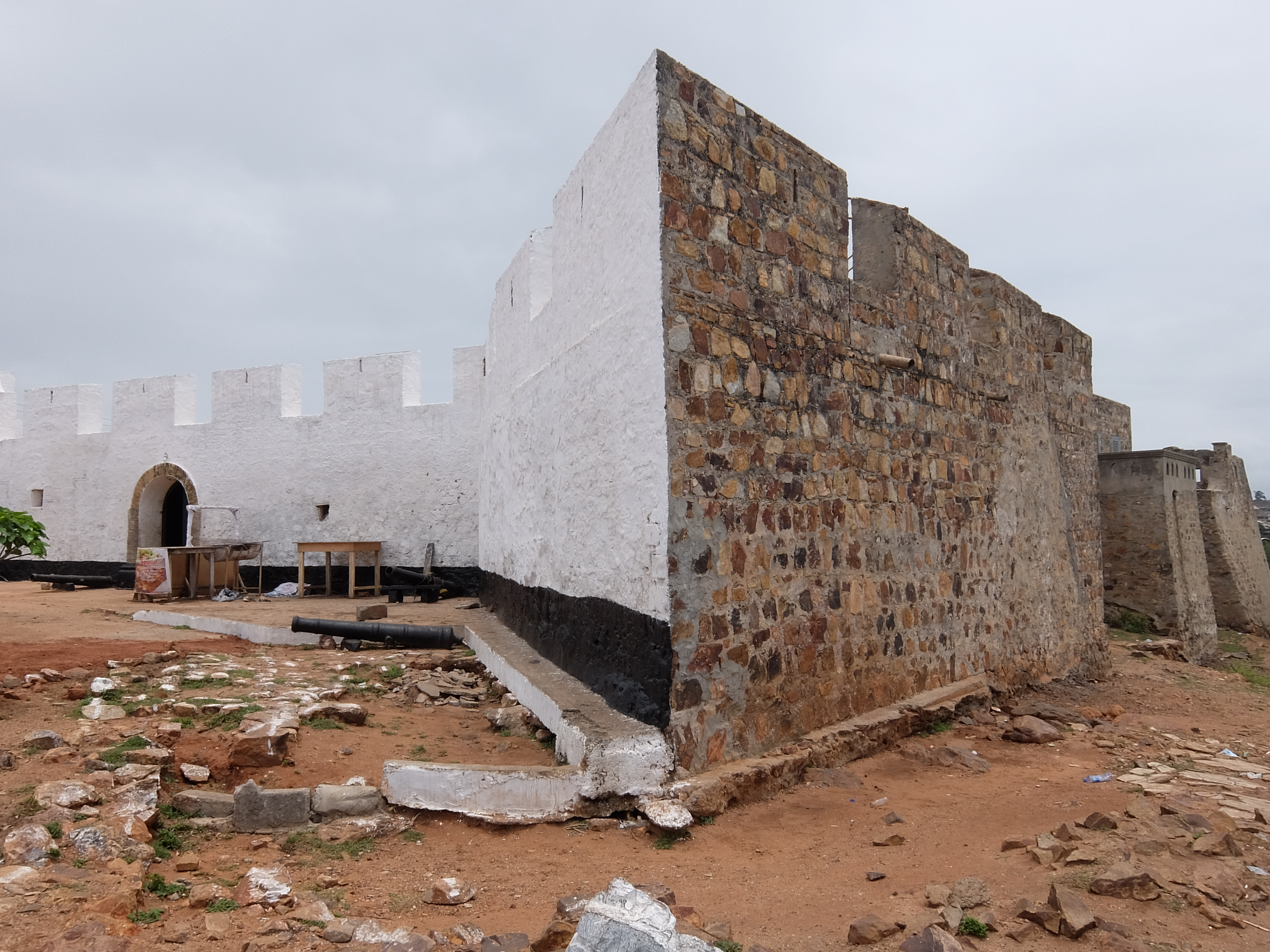
The front and side view of Fort de Goede Hoop (Good Hope)

Video: rooftop area view

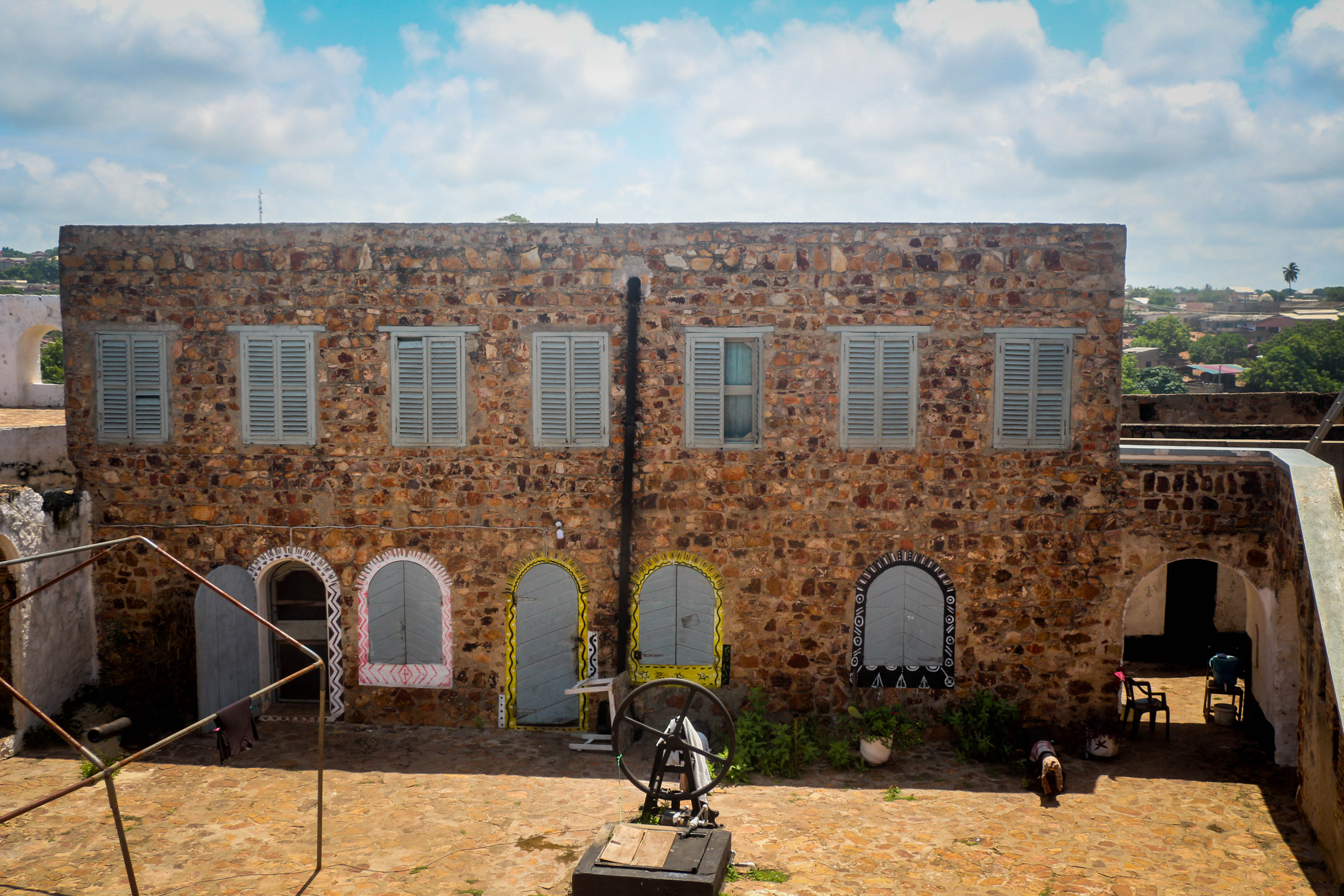
Fort Good Hope in Ghana

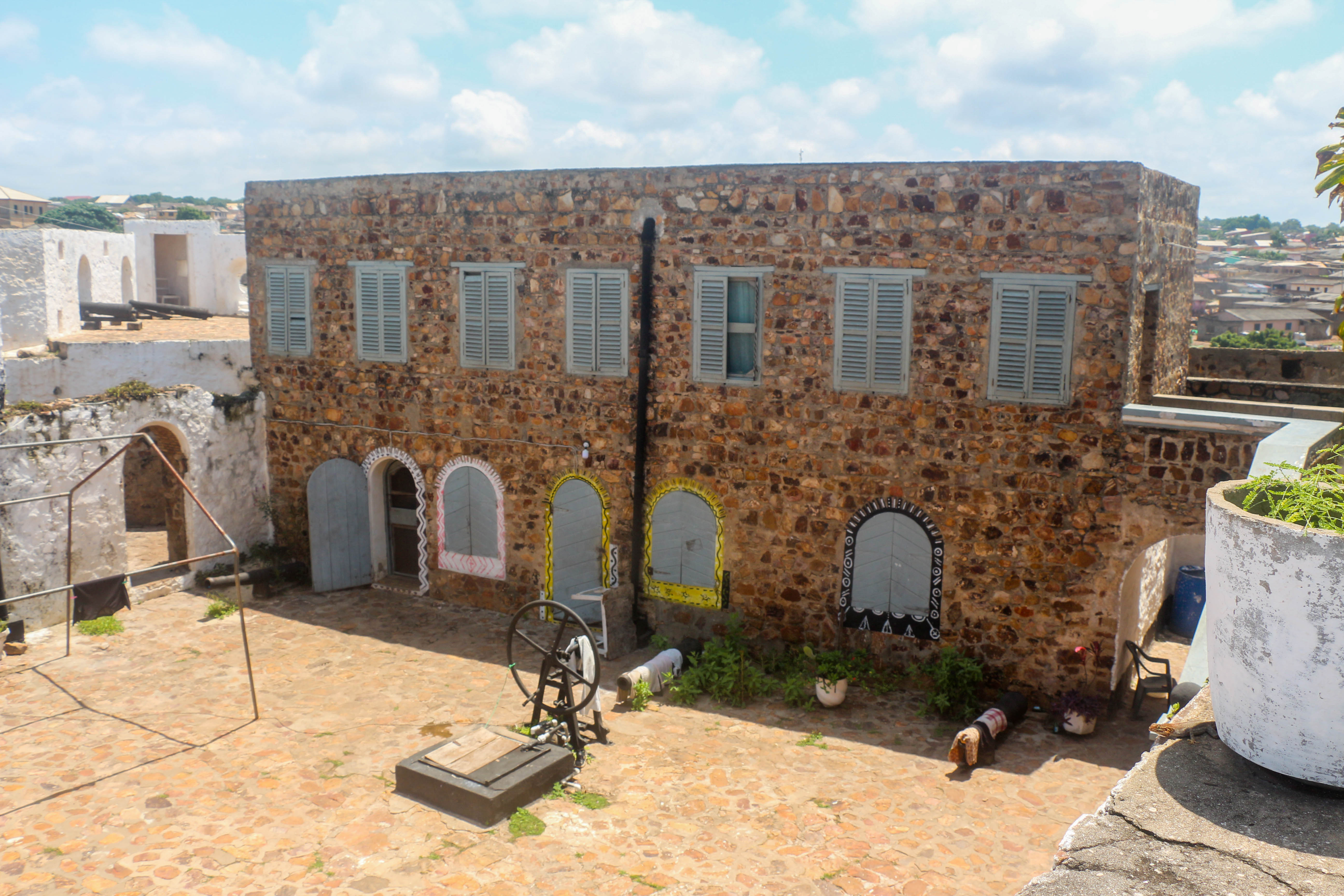
Fort Good Hope in Ghana

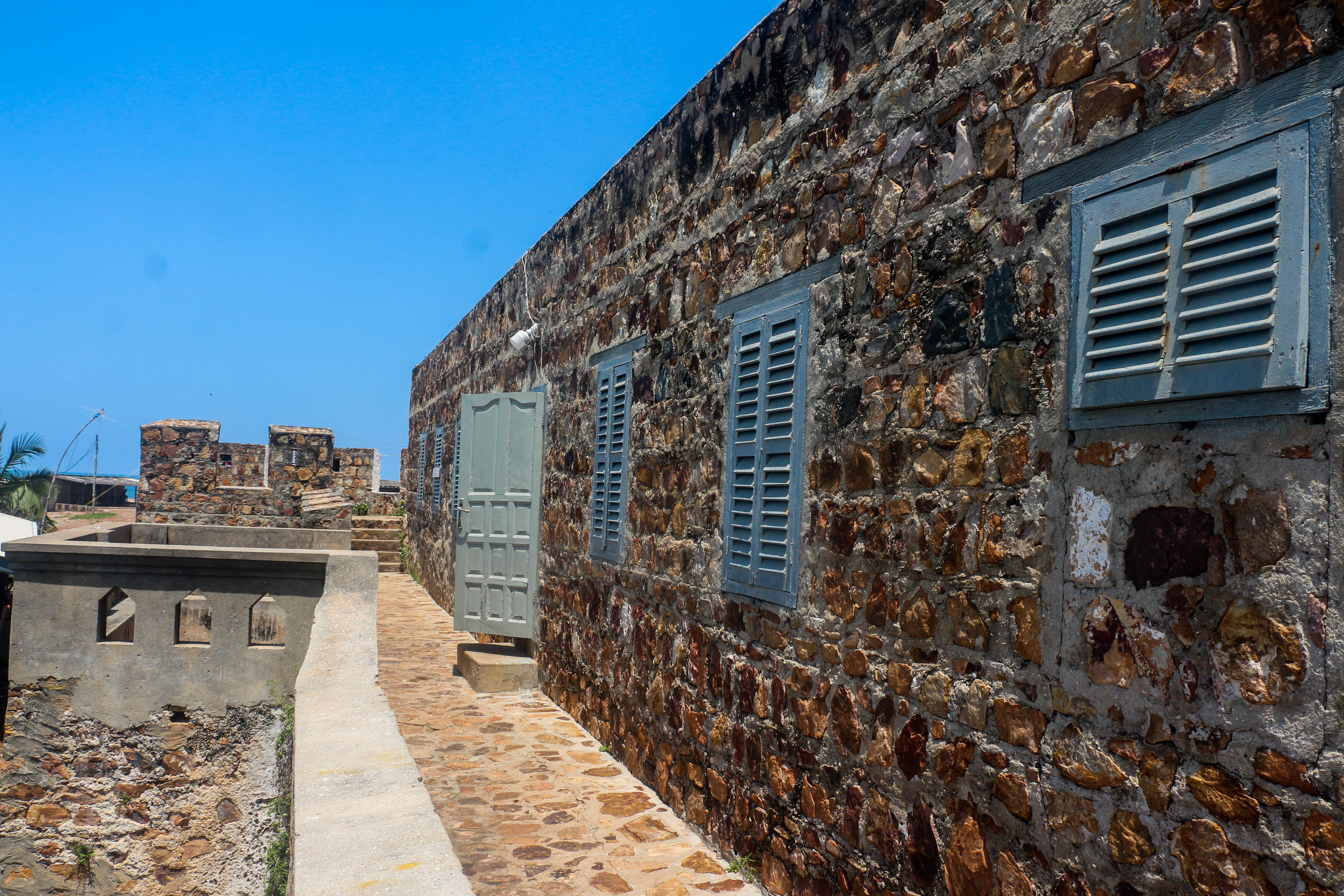
Fort Good Hope in Ghana

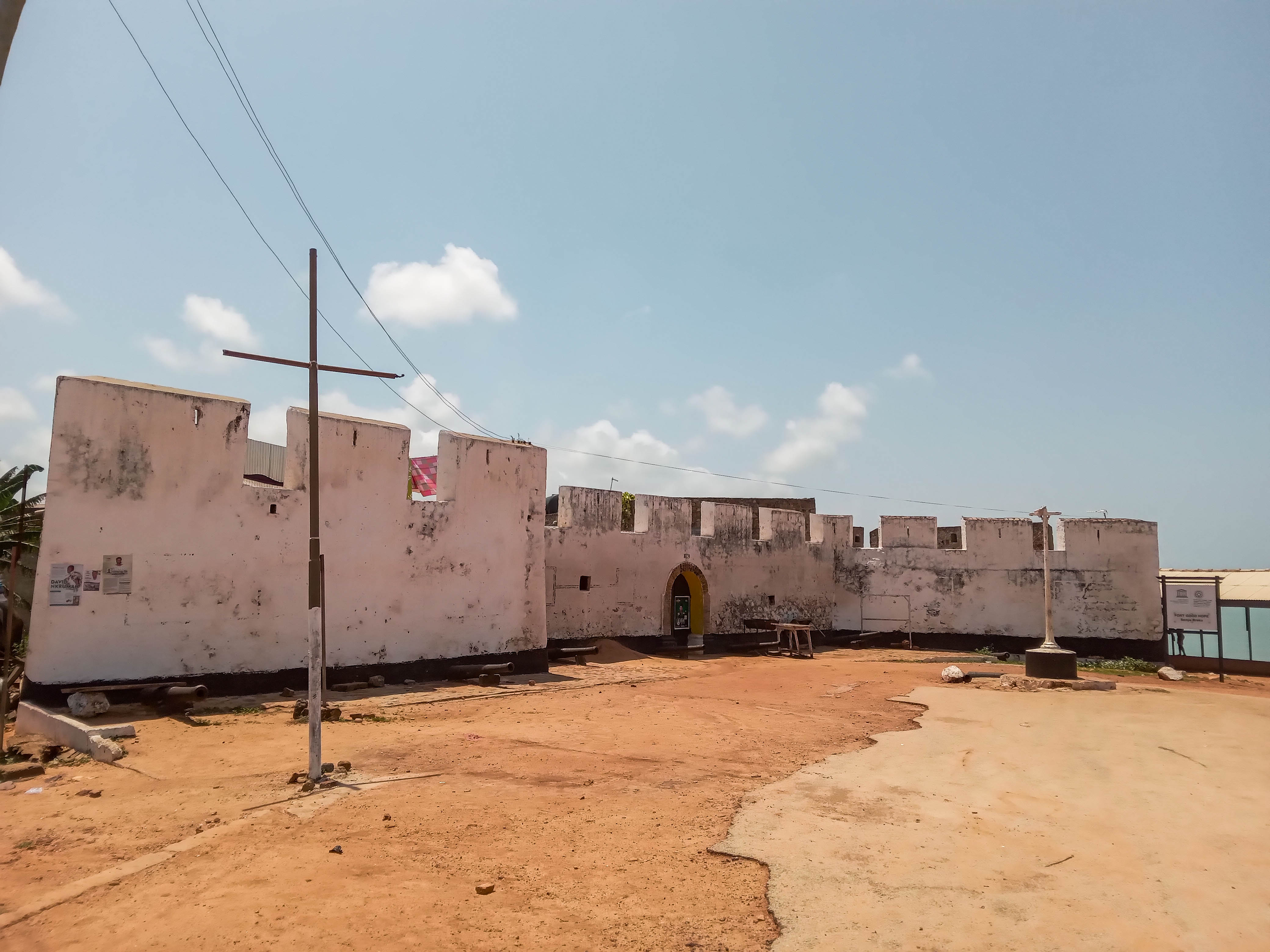
Fort Good Hope in Ghana

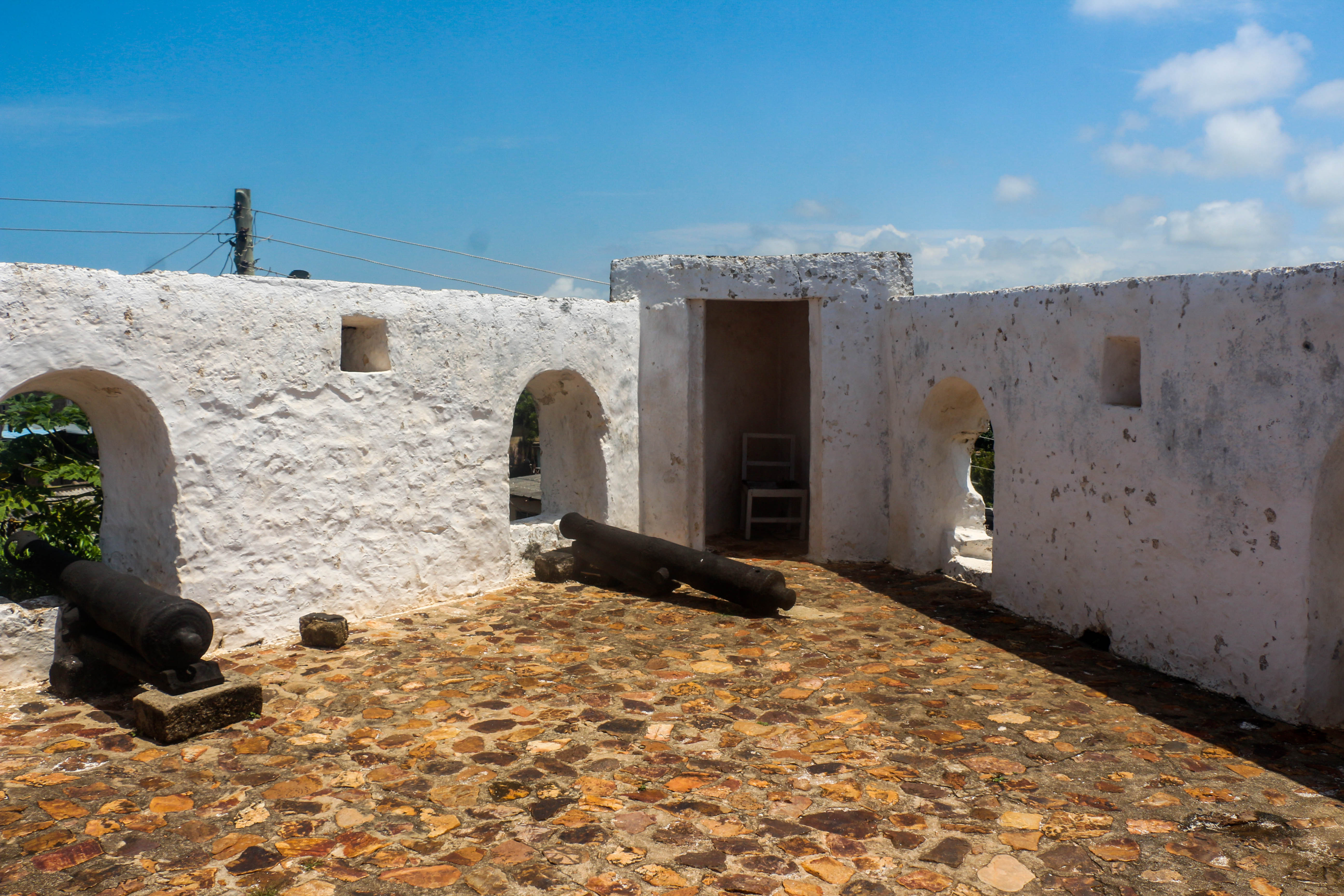
Canon balls at Fort Good Hope in Ghana

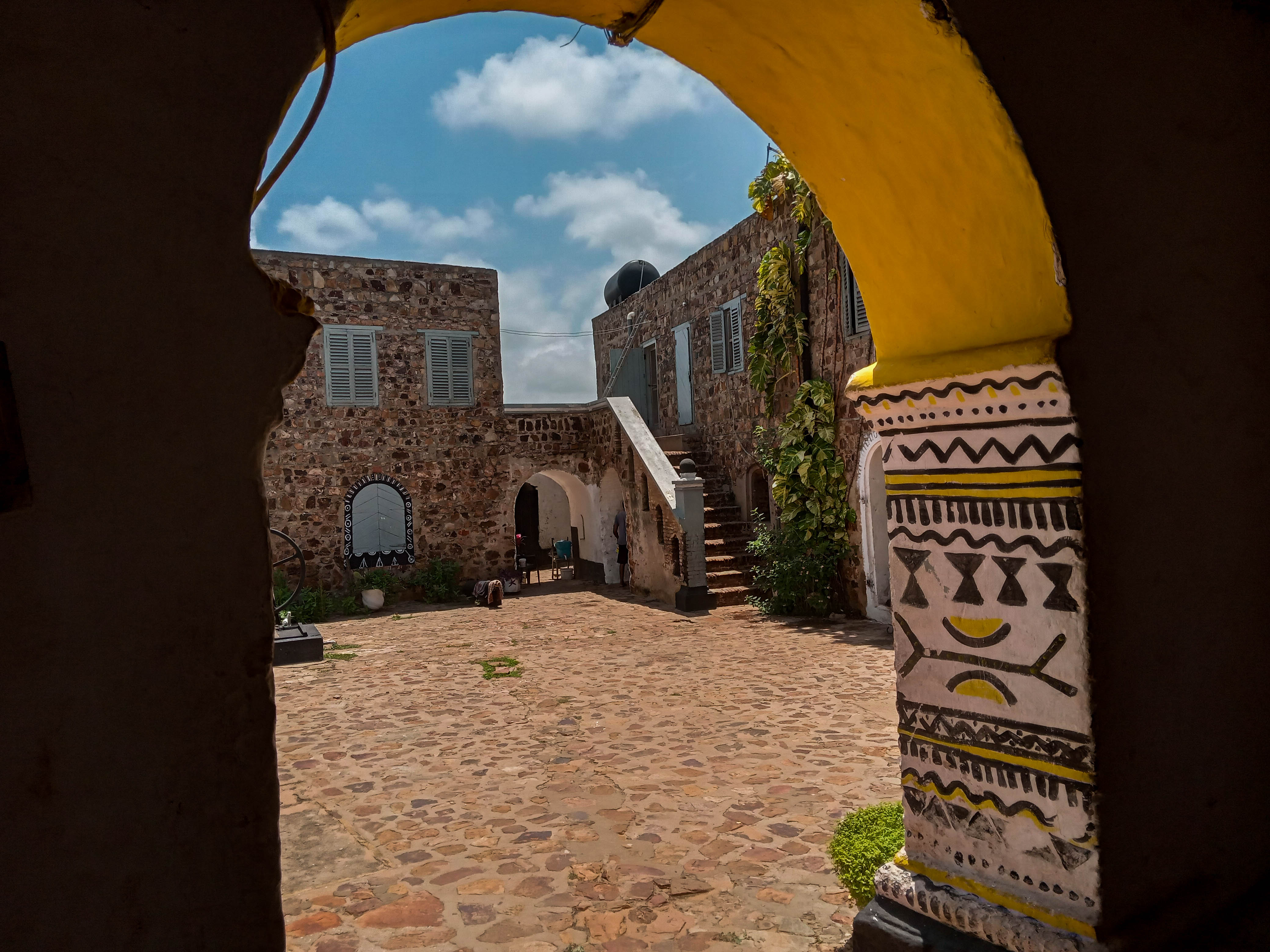
Fort Good Hope in Ghana

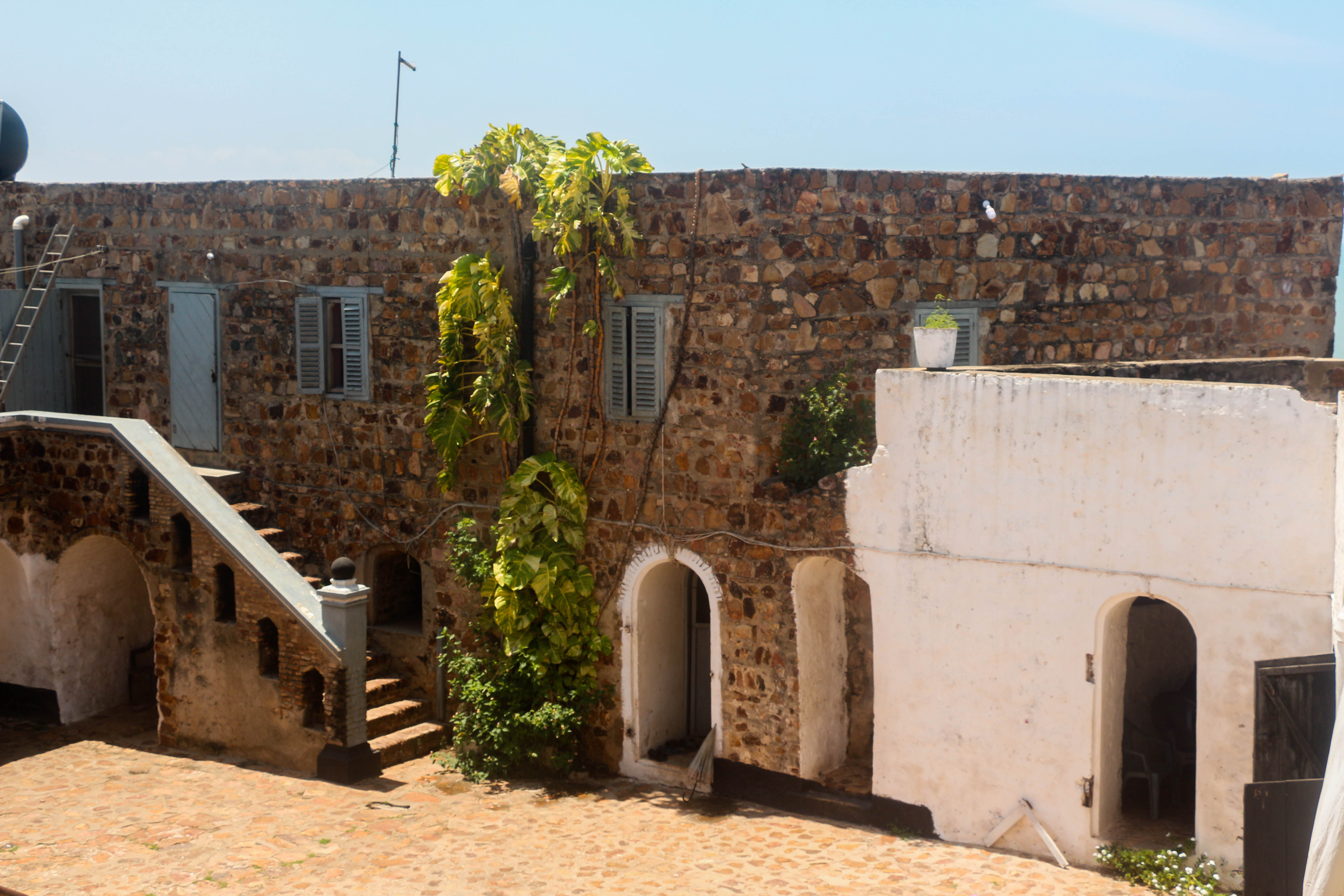
Fort Good Hope in Ghana

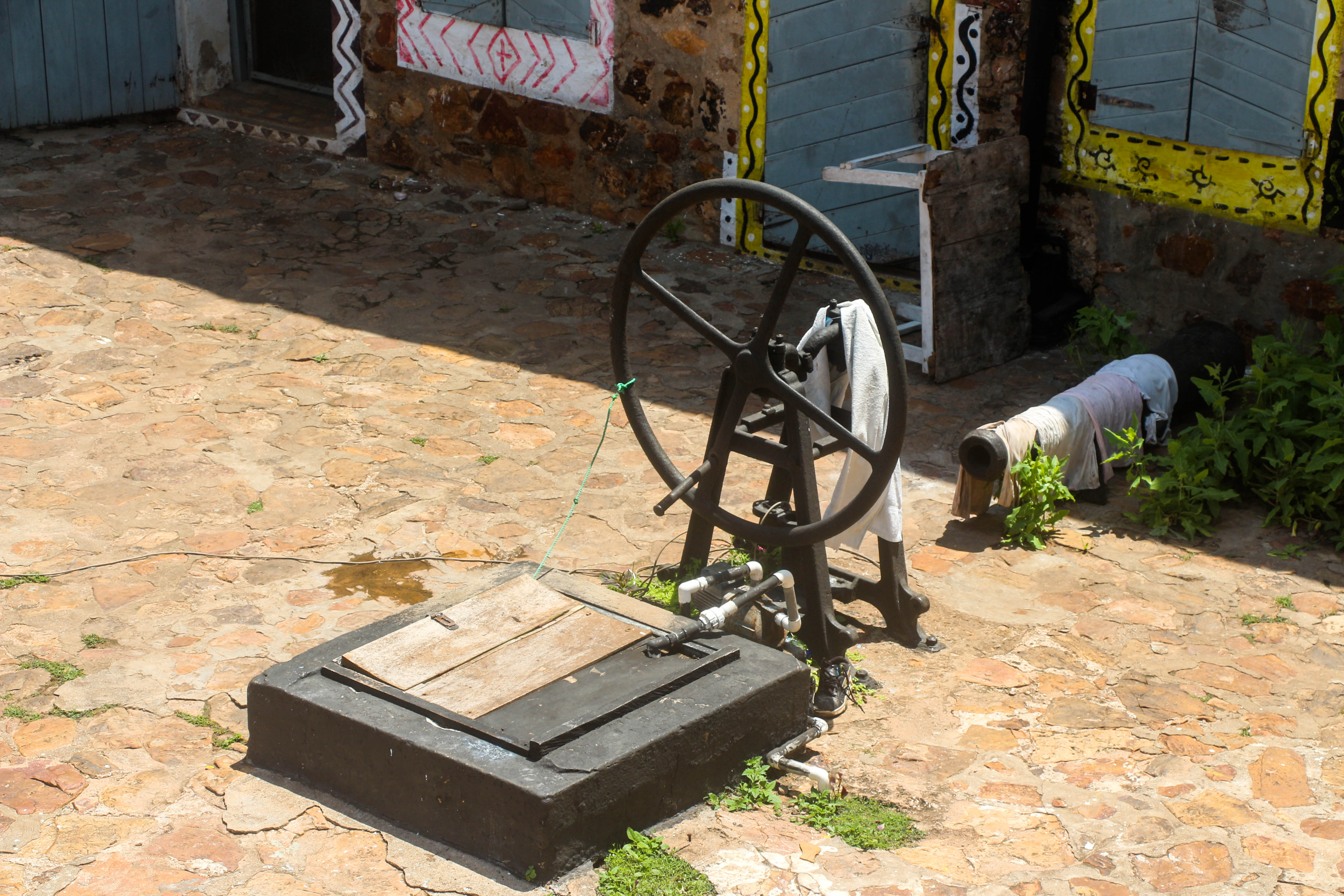
Fort Good Hope in Ghana

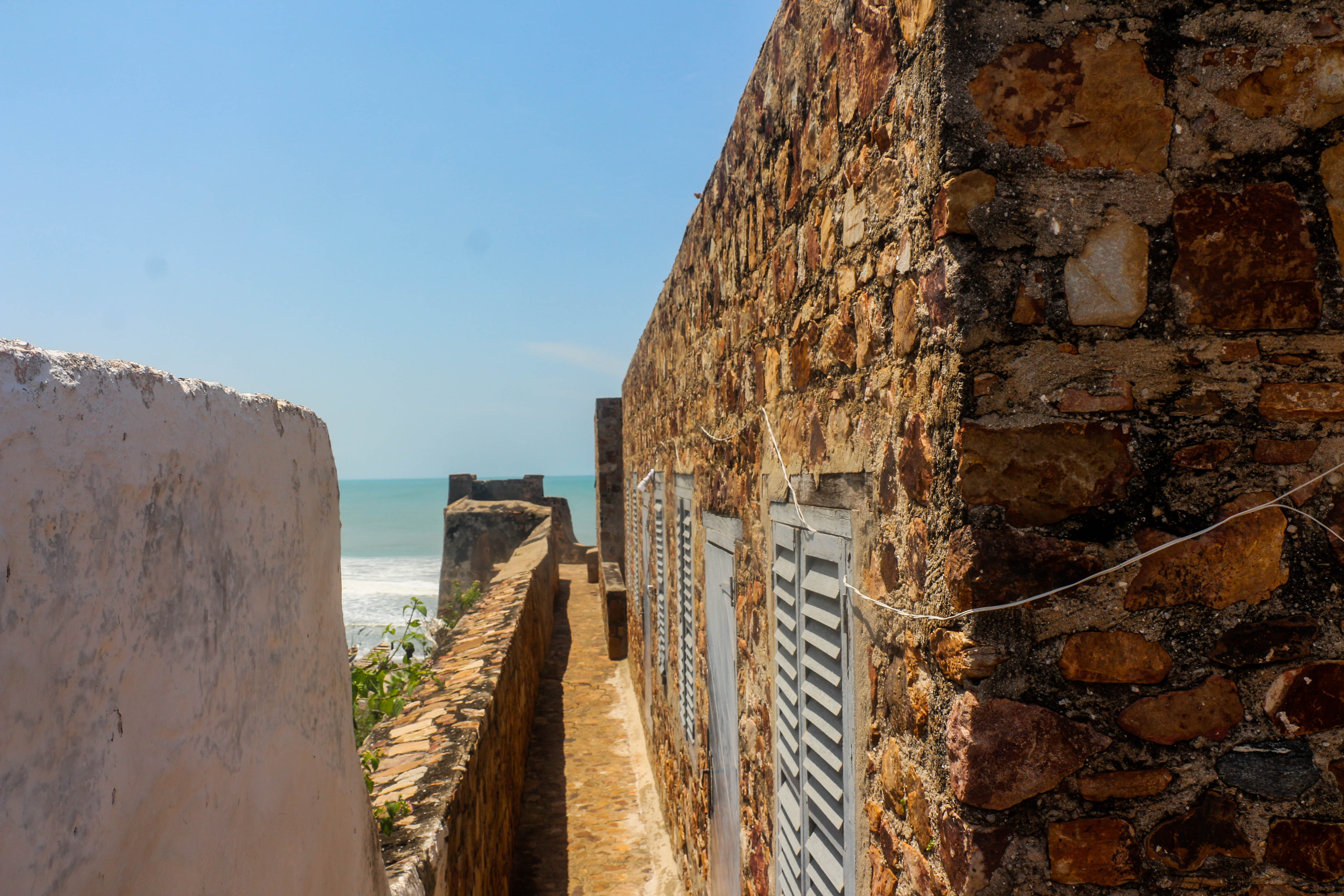
Fort Good Hope in Ghana
