= Fort William Lighthouse =

Building in Ghana

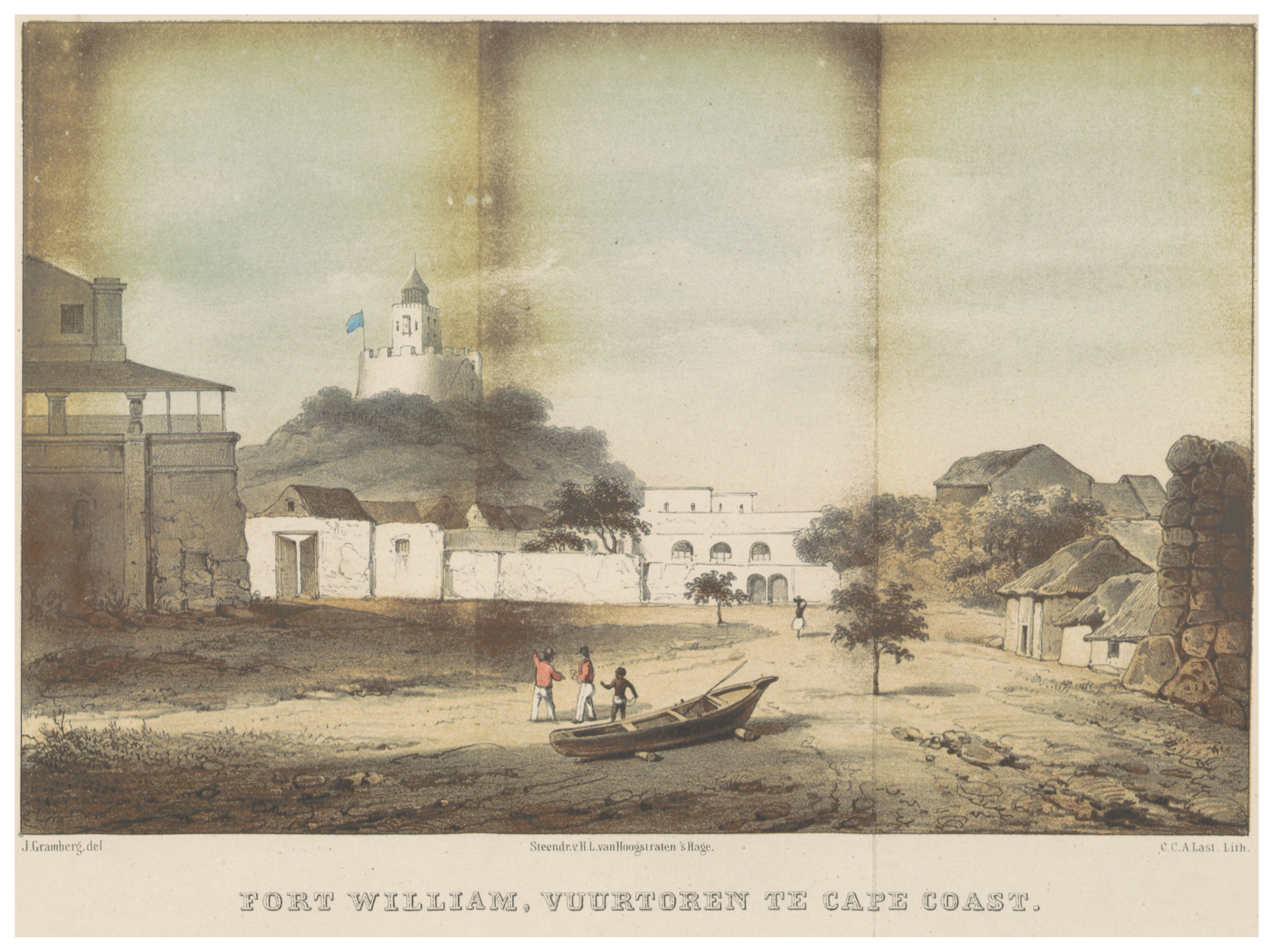
- Fort William Lighthouse (published 1861)
- Location: Dawson's Hill, Cape Coast, Central Region, Ghana
- Coordinates: 5.10797°N 1.24428°W

Tower
- Constructed: 1820
- Automated: Yes (modern)
- Height: 20 m (approx.)
- Shape: Square tower with lantern
- Markings: White tower, red lantern roof

Light
- Focal height: 35 m above sea level
- Lens: Originally oil lamp; modernized with electric light
- Range: 10 nautical miles (approx.)
- Characteristic: Fl (2) W 15s (two white flashes every 15 seconds)

Fort William Lighthouse (also known as Cape Coast Castle Light) is a lighthouse located on Dawson's Hill in the old town of Cape Coast, Ghana's Central Region. Despite the alternate name, it is not part of the Cape Coast Castle complex, lying approximately 600 metres (1/3 mile) away from the castle.

It is recognized as part of the Forts and Castles of Ghana UNESCO World Heritage List site, inscribed in 1979 due to its historical significance in the transatlantic trade and colonial administration.

== History ==
The lighthouse was initially constructed in 1820 under the supervision of British Governor Hope-Smith and was originally named Smith's Tower. Its primary purpose was to guide ships safely into Cape Coast harbor and support British colonial maritime operations. During the 1830s, the structure was reconstructed and renamed Fort William.

== Architecture and design ==
Fort William Lighthouse is a square stone tower with a white-painted exterior and a red lantern roof. The tower's design reflects functional maritime architecture of the early 19th century, with a lantern on top providing the main light for navigation. The lighthouse stands approximately 20 meters tall with a focal height of about 35 meters above sea level, providing a navigational range of roughly 10 nautical miles.

== Current use and management ==
Fort William Lighthouse is maintained by the Ghana Museums & Monuments Board (GMMB). It is operational and open to visitors. The site houses GMMB staff offices, and visitors can explore the lighthouse exterior, nearby cannons, and viewpoints offering panoramic views of Cape Coast town and harbor.

== Gallery ==
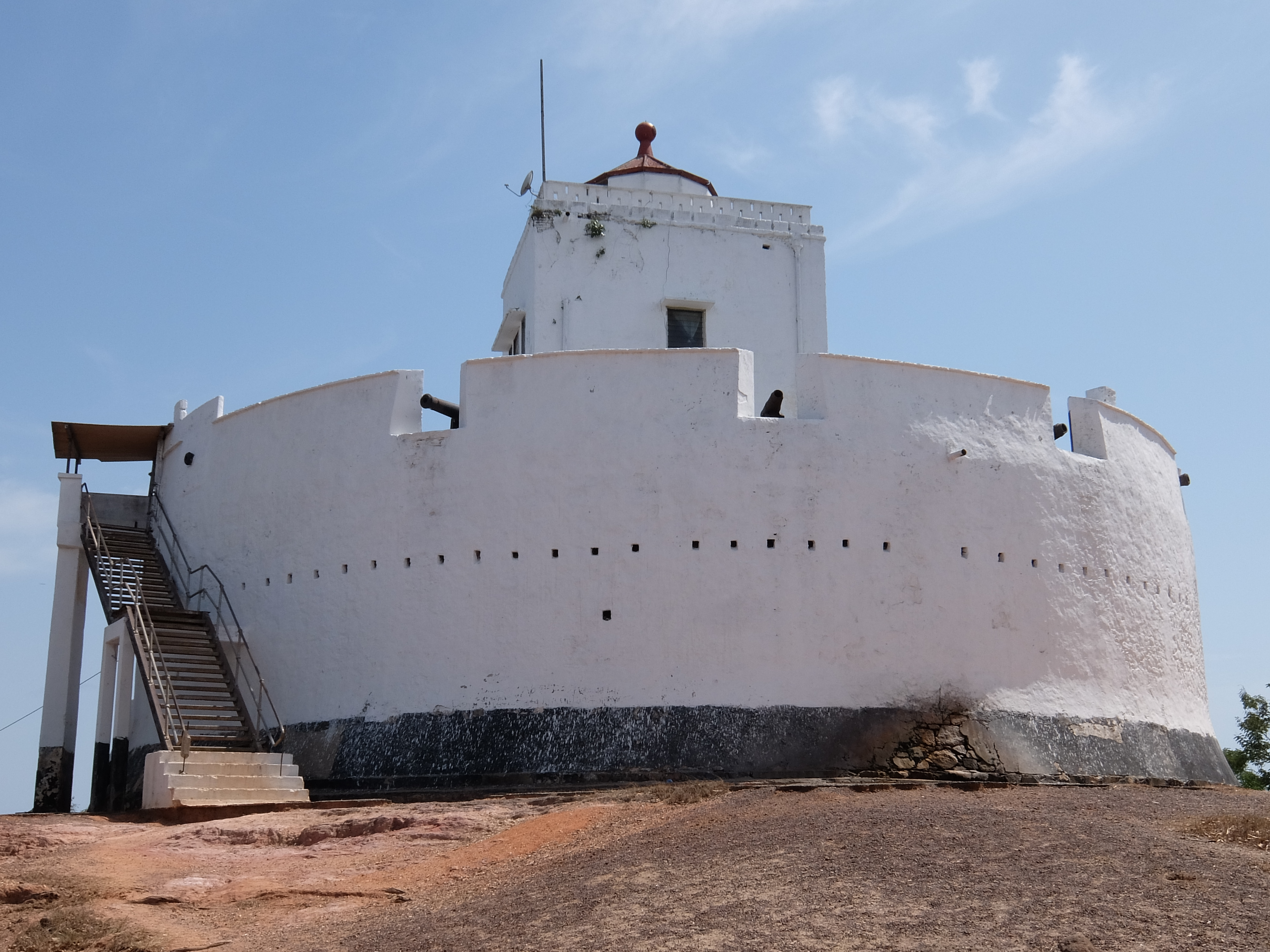

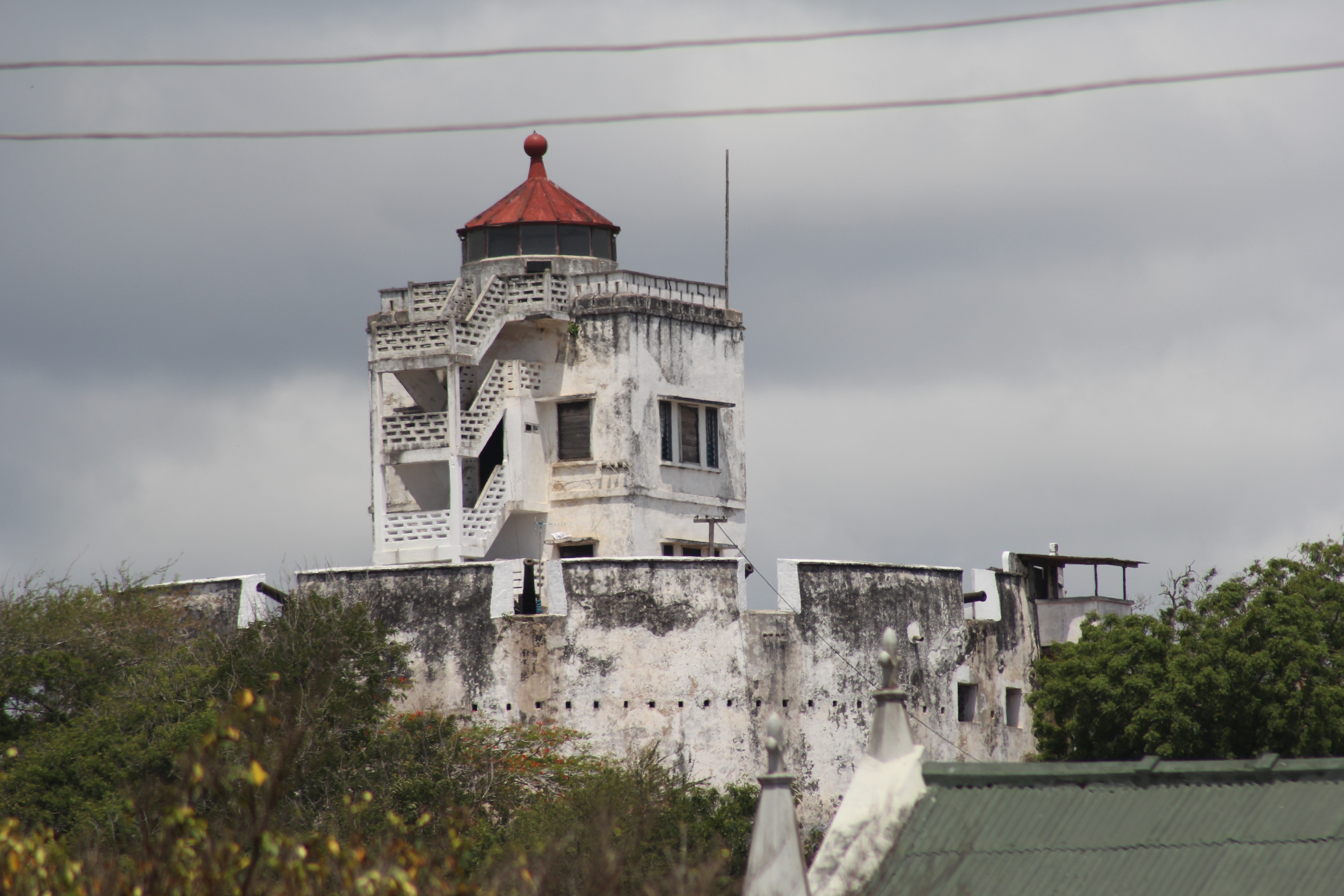

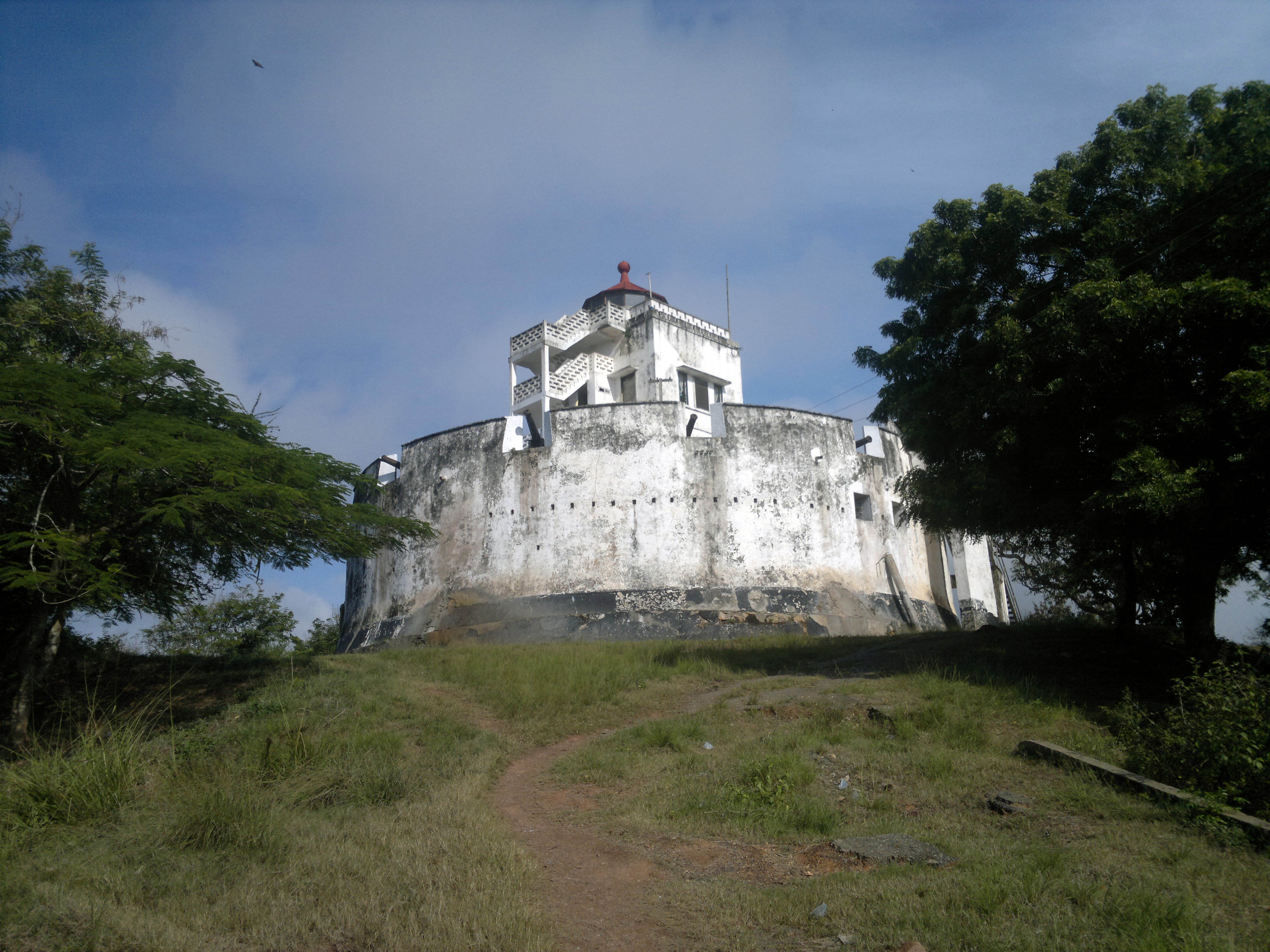

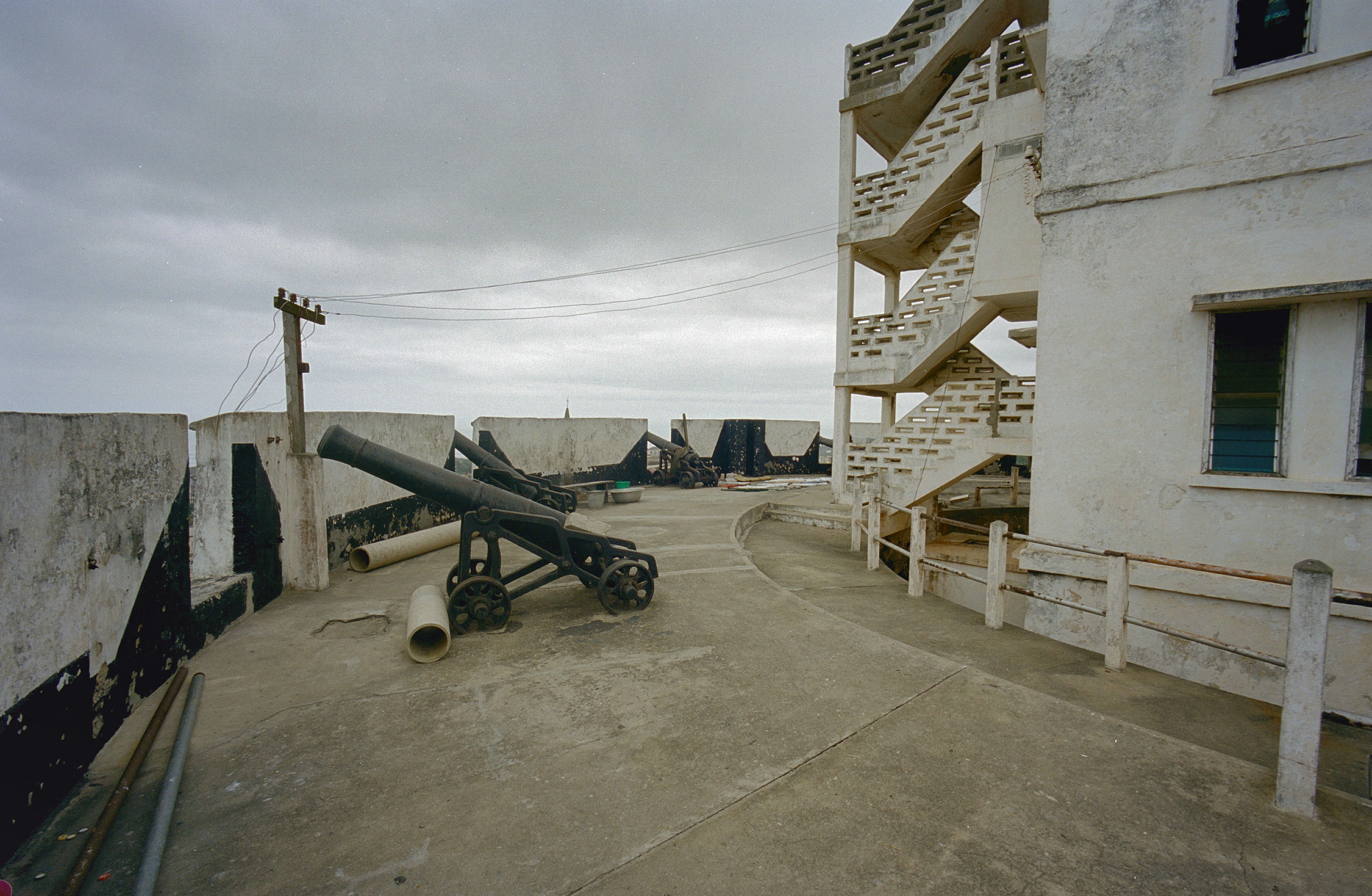

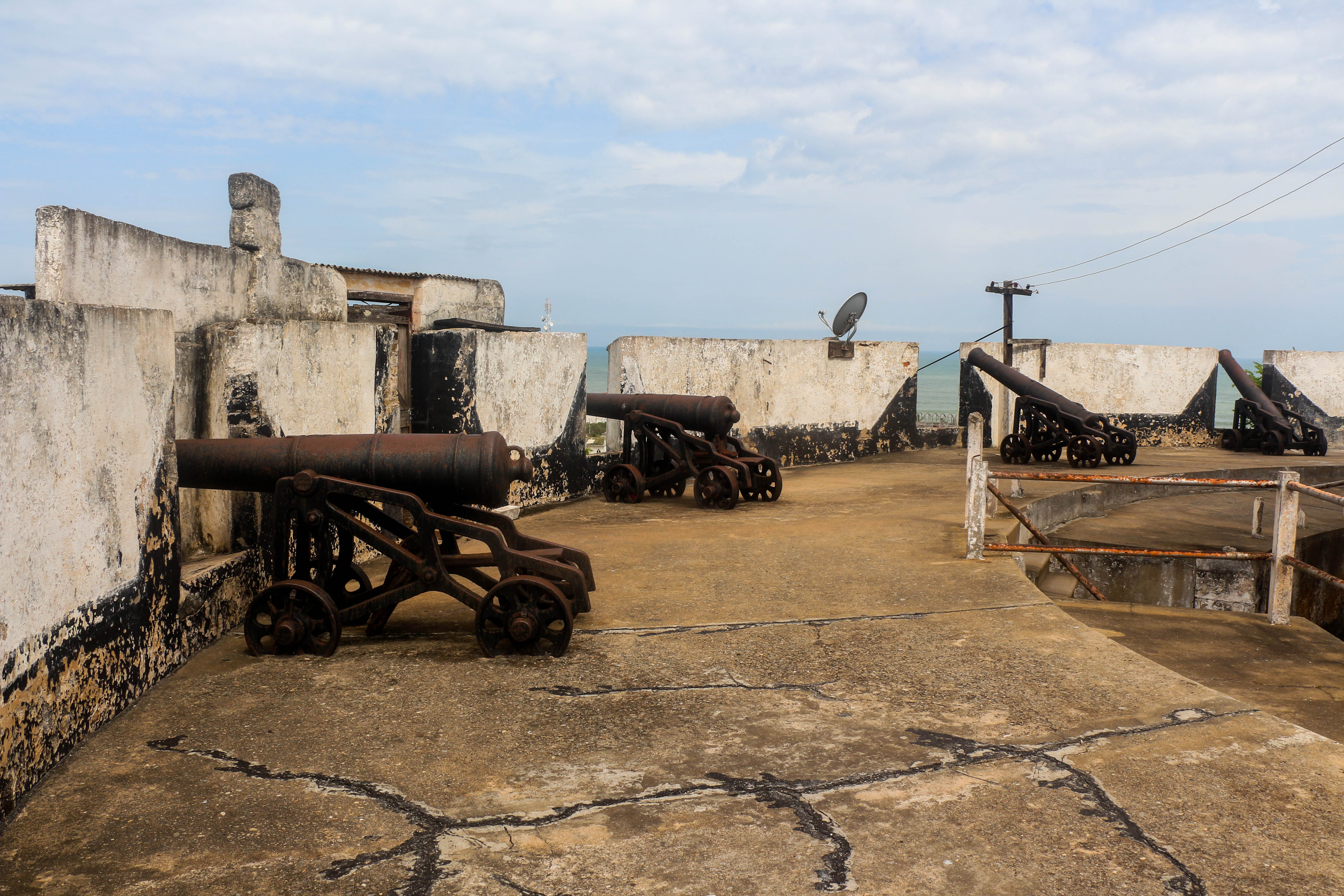
Fort William Lighthouse in Ghana

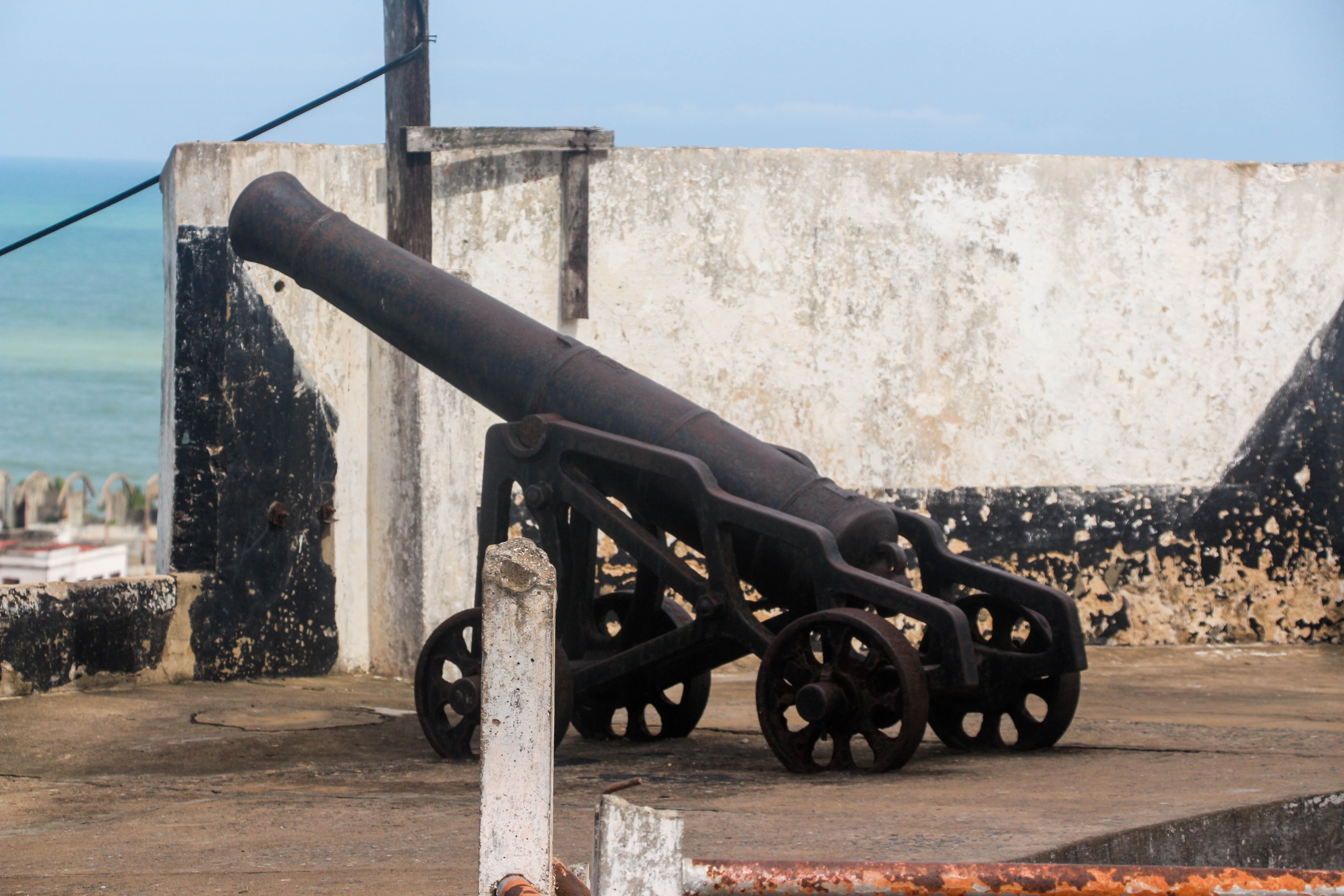
Cannonball at Fort William Lighthouse in Ghana

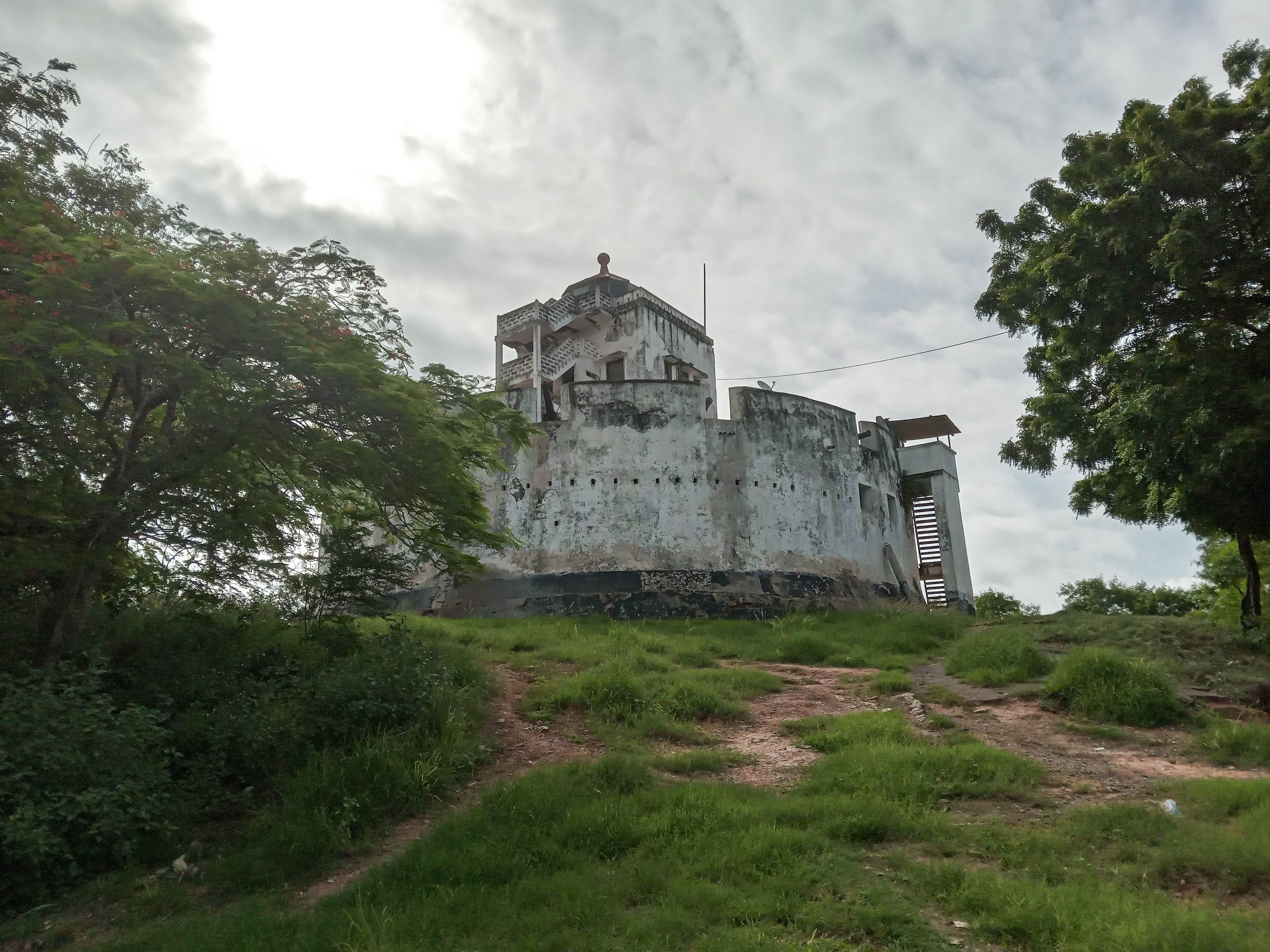
Fort William Lighthouse in Ghana

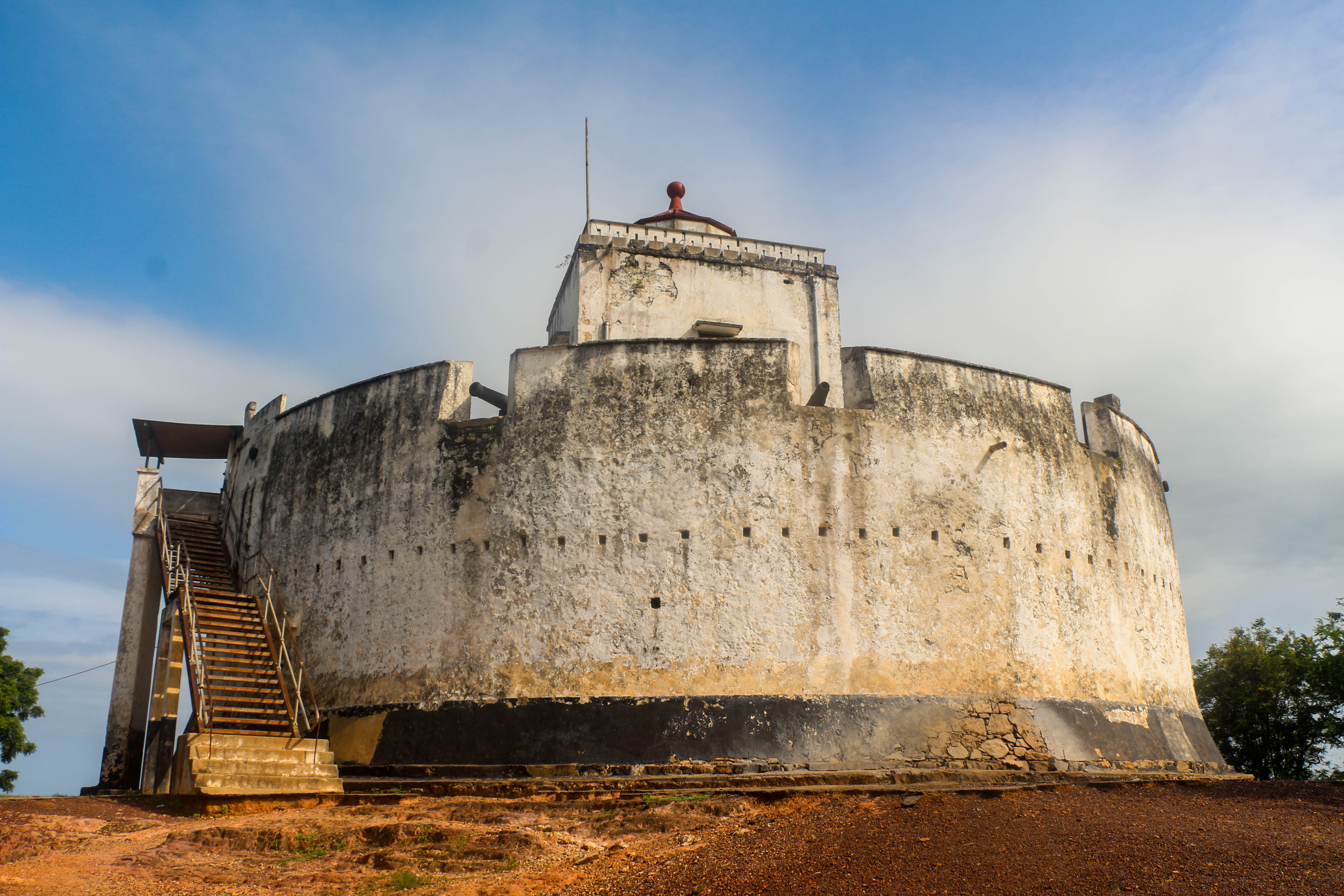
Fort William Lighthouse viewpoint

== See also ==
- List of lighthouses in Ghana
- Cape Coast Castle
