= Prampram =

Prampram Ningo-Prampram Constituency
- Location in Ghana
- Coordinates: 5°43′N 0°06′E
- Country: Ghana
- Region: Greater Accra Region
- District: Ningo Prampram

Prampram is a coastal town in the Greater Accra Region of Ghana. The town is located in the Ningo Prampram District.

Prampram (Gbugbla), the capital of Ningo-Prampram, is 15 minutes' drive from the port city of Tema and 45 minutes from Accra, the national capital, and is an emerging center of industrial activities.

== Places of interest ==
The town is set to become an international hub as the government has acquired more than 60 acres of land to construct the country's first Aerotropolis.

Prampram features several white sand beaches and recreational facilities for tourists.

The town is home to the first and only bulletproof police station in Ghana, built by the Danes.

A small English trading fort, Fort Vernon, built in 1742, is located in Prampram.

A video showing the Dancing Pallbearers, carrying a coffin and dancing to remember the deceased person's life, soon became viral, and later an internet meme.

In February 2021, Romco Group opened a non-ferrous recycling facility in Prampram, consisting of two furnaces.

=== Notable natives ===
Notable natives and residents of Prampram include:

- Nene Annorkwei II
- Kofi Adumua Bossman, former Justice of the Supreme Court of Ghana
- W. A. N Adumua Bossman, former President of Ghana Bar Association
- Enoch Teye Mensah (E. T. Mensah), former member of the Ghana Parliament for Ningo-Prampram
- Naa Morkor Busia, former first Lady, wife of late Dr. Kofi Abrefia Busia
- Ernestina Naadu Mills, former Ghana first lady, wife of the late President John Atta Mills
- Members of the Nana Otafrija Pallbearing Service, also known as The Dancing Pallbearers
- Charles Akonnor, Ghanaian football coach, Head Coach of the Ghana national football team

=== Notable schools ===
- Prampram Senior High School
- Prampram Women's Vocational Training Institute
- Central University
- Oasis International Training Centre
- Songbok Mission School
