= Sionne Neely =

- Education: University of Georgia, Howard University
- Occupation: Film Producer

Sionne Neely is a co-founder of the Chale Wote Street Art Festival. She was one of the directors of Accra [dot] Alt, an organization that documents rising Ghanaian artistes and Ghanaian culture.

== Early life and education ==
In August 2010, Sionne graduated from the University of Southern California with a PhD in American Studies and Ethnicity. In December 2005, she obtained her M.F.A in film at the Howard University. In May 2005, she graduated from University of Georgia with a degree in Telecom Arts.

== Career ==
Sionne is the co-founder of both the Chale Wote Street Art Festival and the Accra [dot] Alt. She co-produced the Accra Homecoming Concert and documented a film (Gbaa Mi Sane) to showcase young artists in Ghana in 2013.
