= Fort James, Ghana =

Fortified colonial trading post

Fort James
- Part of British Gold Coast
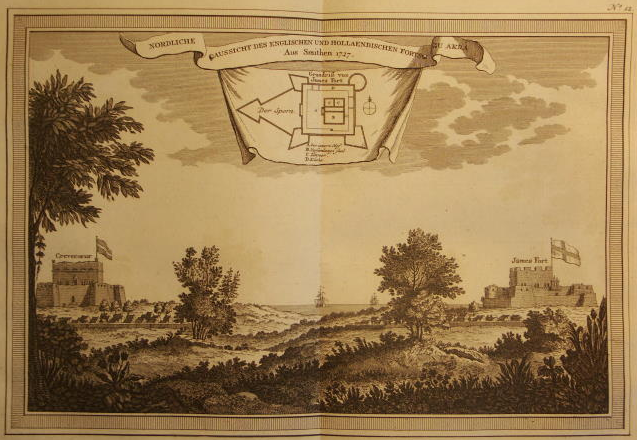
- Fort Crèvecœur (left) and Fort James (right) in 1727.

Location
- Location within Ghana
- Coordinates: 5.5337°N 0.2111°W

Site history
- Built: 1673

Garrison information
- Occupants: Britain (1673-1957)

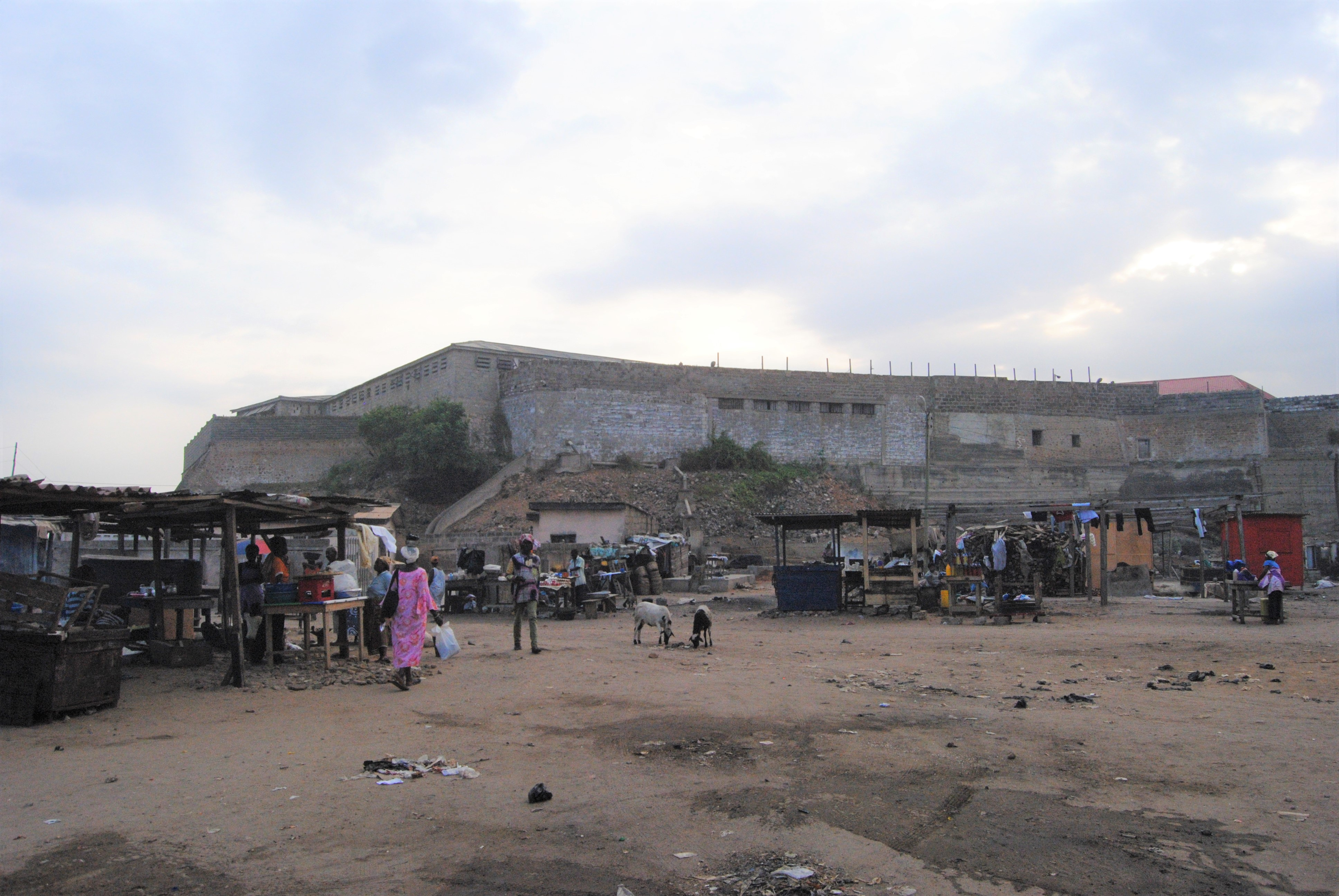
James Fort from the direction of the sea

Fort James (alternatively referred to as James Fort) is a fort located in Accra, Ghana. It was built by the Royal African Company of England (RAC) as a trading post for both gold and slaves in 1673, where it joined the Dutch Fort Crêvecœur (1649), and the Danish Fort Christiansborg (1652) along the coast of the then Gold Coast. Along with other castles and forts in Ghana, Fort James was inscribed on the UNESCO World Heritage List in 1979 because of its importance during the European colonial period.

Fort James was likely named after James, then Duke of York, later King James II, who was Governor of the RAC at the time it was built and after whom the adjacent town of Jamestown in Accra is also named.

The fort stands next to Jamestown Lighthouse and from the colonial era up to 2008, served as a prison. Ghana's first president, Kwame Nkrumah, was imprisoned from 1950 to 1951 with common criminals in Fort James.

== Current situation ==
It is an historic castle and serves as a tourist site. James Fort is in a fairly good condition.

== Additional images ==
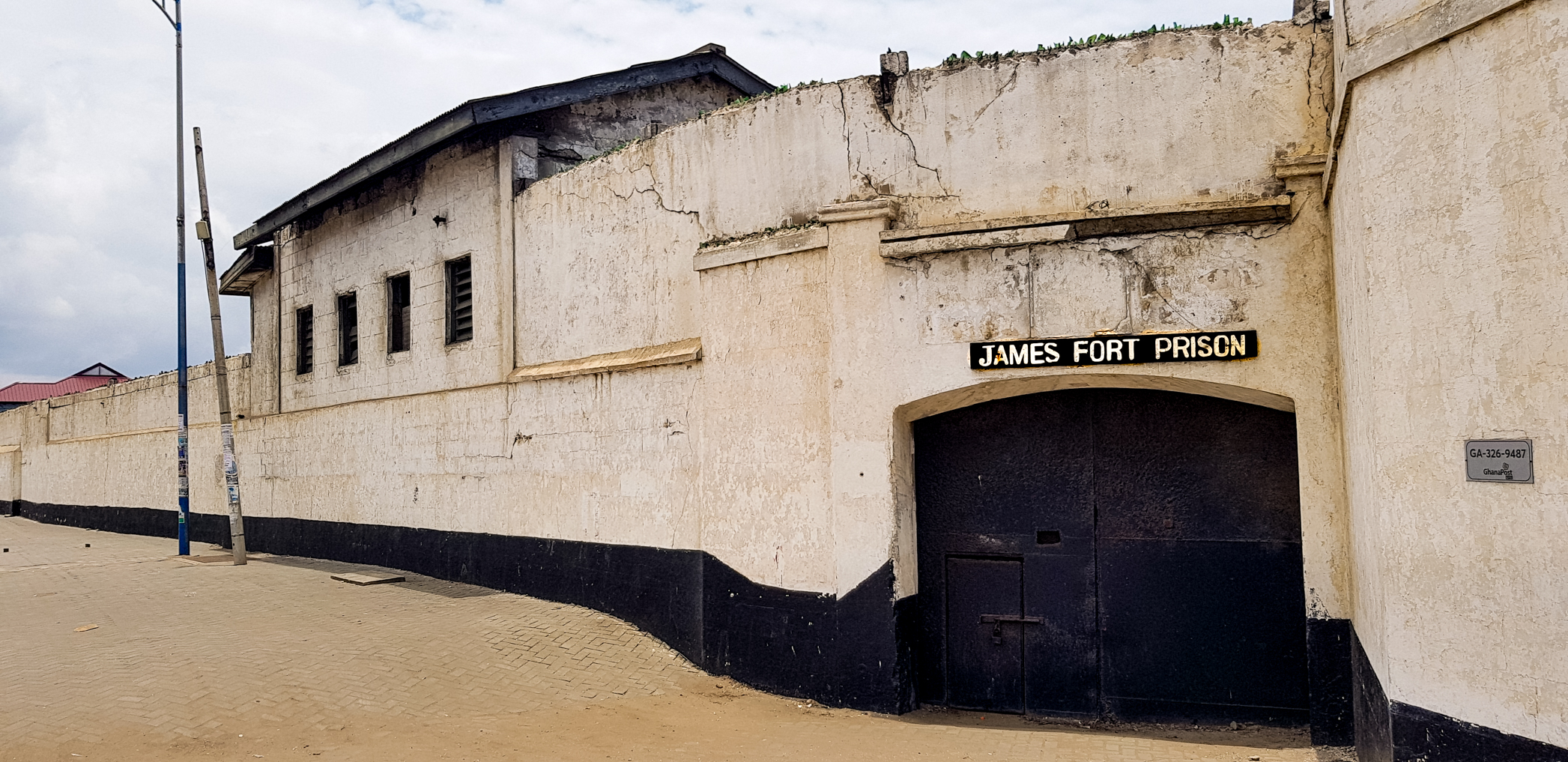

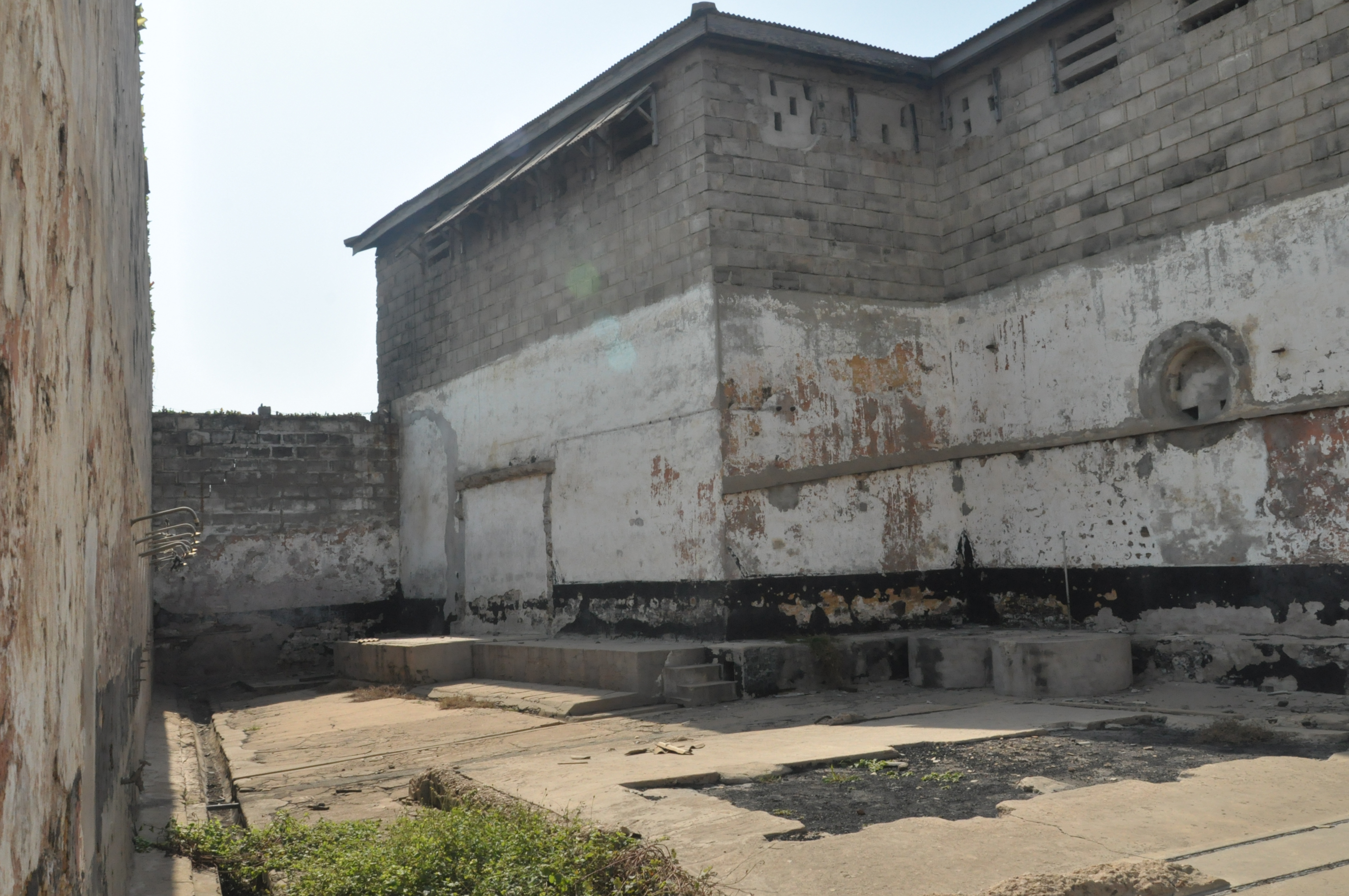

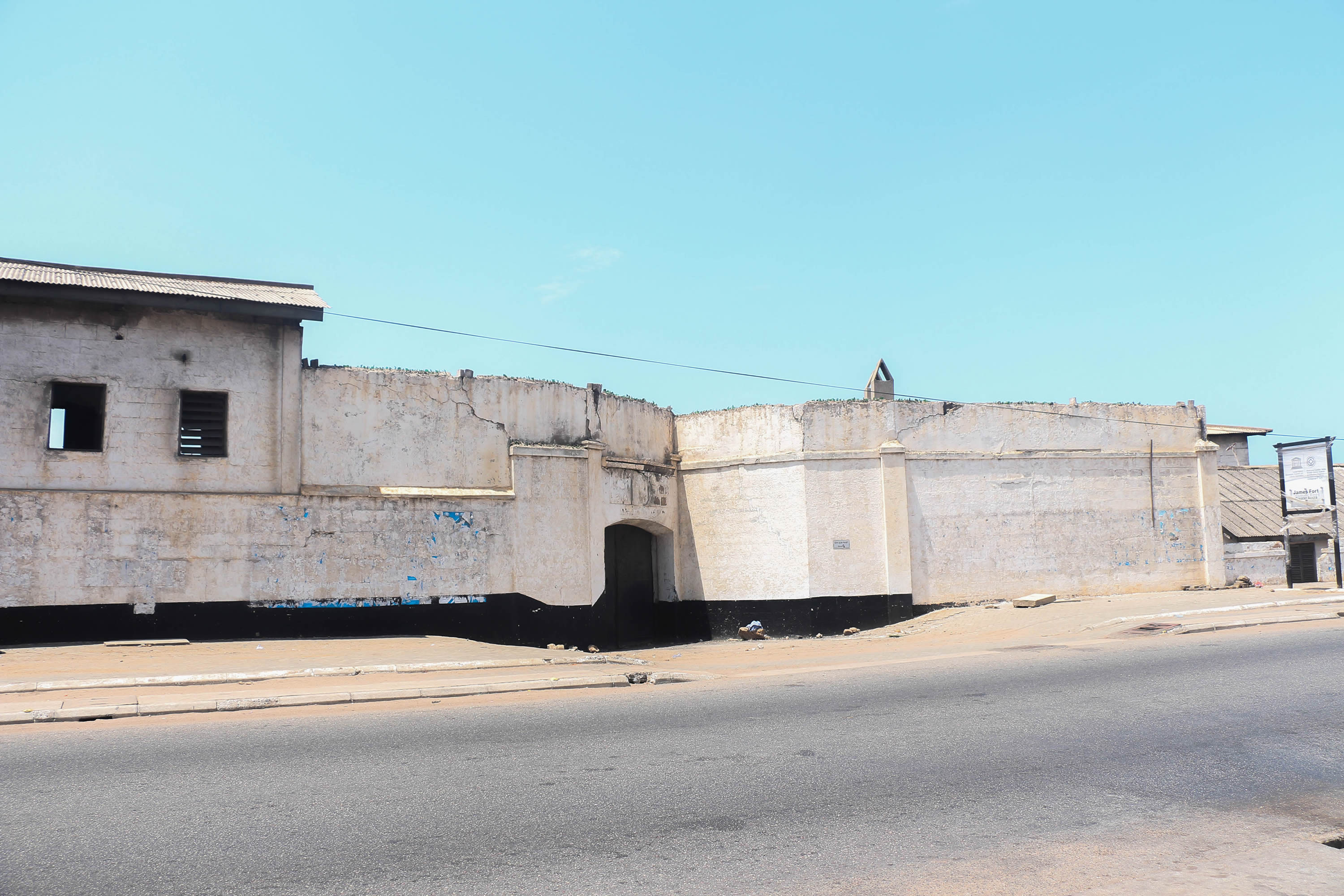
James Fort, Ghana
