= Michael Kurdle-Armah =

Ghanaian talent manager and businessman

- Born: Michael Nii Aryee Kurdle-Armah; October 16, 1991 (age 34); Jamestown, Ghana
- Education: Adisadel College; Kwame Nkrumah University of Science and Technology
- Years active: 2014–present
- Label: Kurdle Music Worldwide

Michael Nii Aryee Kurdle-Armah (born 16 October 1991) is a Ghanaian businessman and CEO of Kurdle Music Worldwide, a record label based in West Palm Beach and Accra, Ghana.

== Early life ==
Kurdle-Armah was born in Jamestown a suburb of Accra in Ghana. He attended St. Pauls Lutheran School, Kanda for his junior high school education and then moved on to Adisadel College, Cape Coast for his senior high school education. He then proceeded to the Kwame Nkrumah University of Science and Technology where he earned a bachelor's degree in political science.

== Career ==
Kurdle-Armah is the Founder and CEO of Kurdle Music Worldwide a record label based in West Palm Beach and Accra, Ghana. In 2021 he signed Gospel musician Perpetual Didier to a five-year contract to the label.
