= Accra Royal School =

Public school in Accra, Ghana

Location
- London Market St, Jamestown; Greater Accra Region; Ghana
- Coordinates: 5.5351°N 0.2156°W

Information
- Type: Public
- School district: Accra Metropolis
- Oversight: Ghana Education Service
- Gender: Co-educational (Boys/Girls)
- Age range: 4 to 15 years
- Campus type: Suburban

Accra Royal School (also known as the Accra Royal Junior High School or Accra Royal JHS) is a school located in Jamestown in the Greater Accra Region of Ghana.

== History ==
In 2018, some students of the school benefitted from the Amerley Adjaidoo Foundation.

In 2020, students of the school received educational materials from the members of the Mamprobi District of the Young Adults’ Fellowship.

As at 2024, the headmistress of school was Madam Francesca Garbrah.

== Facilities ==
The school has the following facilities:

- 6-unit classroom block,
- A library,
- Headmistress's office,
- Staff common room,
- A storeroom,
- Washrooms,
- Paved compound, and
- Landscaped garden space

== Notable alumni ==
- Agness Oforiwa Tagoe-Quarcoopome, a freedom fighter for Ghana's independence
- Charles Kumi Gyamfi, a former Ghanaian footballer
- Joe Lartey, a Ghanaian sports commentator
- Mr. John Saka Addo, a former Governor of the Bank of Ghana.
- Oblempong Nii Kojo Ababio V, the former Paramount Chief of Ngleshie Alata Traditional Area
- Emmanuel Obetsebi-Lamptey, Ghanaian politician
