= Oblempong Nii Kojo Ababio V =

Ghanaian dental surgeon and traditional ruler (1920–2017)

- Ngleshie Alata Traditional Area, Accra

Jamestown Maŋtsɛ
- Reign: 1978–2017
- Coronation: 1978
- Born: Ezekiel Quarmina Allotey Cofie; 12 June 1920; Jamestown, Accra, Gold Coast
- Died: 22 December 2017 (aged 97); Accra, Ghana
- House: Royal Stool of Ngleshie Alata
- Religion: Anglican
- Occupation: Dental surgeon; Paramount chief; School proprietor
- Education: Achimota College; University of Edinburgh; Royal College of Surgeons Edinburgh (LDS RCS Ed.)
- Known for: Ghanaian dental surgeon pioneer
- Spouse: Florence Ansaah Cofie (m. 1951)
- Children: 9

Oblempong Nii Kojo Ababio V (Ezekiel Quarmina Allotey Cofie; 12 June 1920 – 22 December 2017) was a Ghanaian dental surgeon pioneer who also served as the Jamestown Maŋtsɛ (Paramount Chief) and President of the Ngleshie Alata Traditional Council. He was popularly known as Dentist Cofie.

== Early life and education ==
A member of the Ga ethnic group, Cofie was born on 12 June 1920 at Jamestown in then British Accra to William Coffie of Aflangi Shia, Naa Korle We and Delphone Owoo from Naa Sally We Krotia Division, Adjumaku of the Royal Stool of Ngleshie Alata (Jamestown) Accra. He attended the Accra Royal School for his elementary and middle education and continued at Achimota College for secondary school. In 1938, at the age of 18, Cofie passed the Senior Cambridge Examination in the Sciences and a year later he passed the London University Matriculation Examination. At Achimota, he was a member of college's athletic and football teams.

In 1943, he was offered admission to University of Edinburgh and at the height of the Second World War, he sailed to the United Kingdom where he studied dentistry and trained as a Dental Surgeon at the then Edinburgh Dental Hospital and School, now part of the Edinburgh Dental Institute. While in Edinburgh, Cofie competed for Scotland at the 1947 World Student Games in Paris where he won a Bronze Medal in the 100-metre sprint race. In 1949, he graduated as a dental surgeon with a Licentiate of Dental Surgery awarded by the Royal College of Surgeons of Edinburgh.

== Career ==
Ezekiel Quarmina Allotey Cofie returned to the Gold Coast completing his professional dental course of study in the United Kingdom. He was offered an appointment as a Dental Surgeon by the Gold Coast Medical Service.

He joined other trailblazers like Brown Oddoye and Adu Aryee to form the core pioneers of dental practice in the country. Cofie played a significant role in the establishment of Dental Units in a number of hospitals across the country. Places like Kumasi, Tamale, Sekondi-Takoradi, Sunyani, Koforidua and Ho where he was instrumental in the establishment of Dental Units attached to hospitals in those cities. During his career, he attended different professional conferences and seminars in cities around the world including London, New York, and New Delhi. He retired from the dental profession and the Ministry of Health in 1975.

== Reign ==
Cofie was enstooled as Ngleshie Alata (Jamestown) Maŋtsɛ under the stool name of Nii Kojo Ababio V from the Nii Kofi Akrashie lineage. He occupied the stool from 1978 till his death in 2017, spanning a period of thirty-nine (39) years.

As a traditional ruler he served in various capacities. He served as a member of the National House of Chiefs for many years and also as a representative of the Eastern Regional House of Chiefs.

When the Greater Accra Regional House was created from the Eastern Regional House of Chiefs, he was again elected to represent the region at the National House of Chiefs. As a member of the Greater Accra Regional House of Chiefs, he represented the House at the Lands Commission. He was the Senior Advisor to the Greater Accra Regional House of Chiefs of which he was a founding member. Under his reign, the Ngleshie Alata chieftaincy was elevated to the status of Paramountcy in 2011

== Personal life ==
On 22 December 1951, he married Florence Ansaah Cofie and they had 9 children, 6 daughters and 3 sons. He was a patron of the football club, Accra Great Olympics. He founded the New Hope Preparatory School in Laterbiokorshie in Accra. He also instituted the Wetse Kojo/ King James Annual Memorial Lectures. His daughter, Zetta Cofie was a sprinter and long jump athlete for Ghana. Cofie was a lifelong Anglican and was known to worship at the Holy Trinity Cathedral, High Street in Accra.

== Death and royal funeral ==
Cofie died on 22 December 2017 in Accra. Oblempong Kojo Ababio V's royal funeral was held in 2018 at the Holy Trinity Cathedral on High Street, Accra.
