= Chale Wote Street Art Festival =

Street festival in Ghana

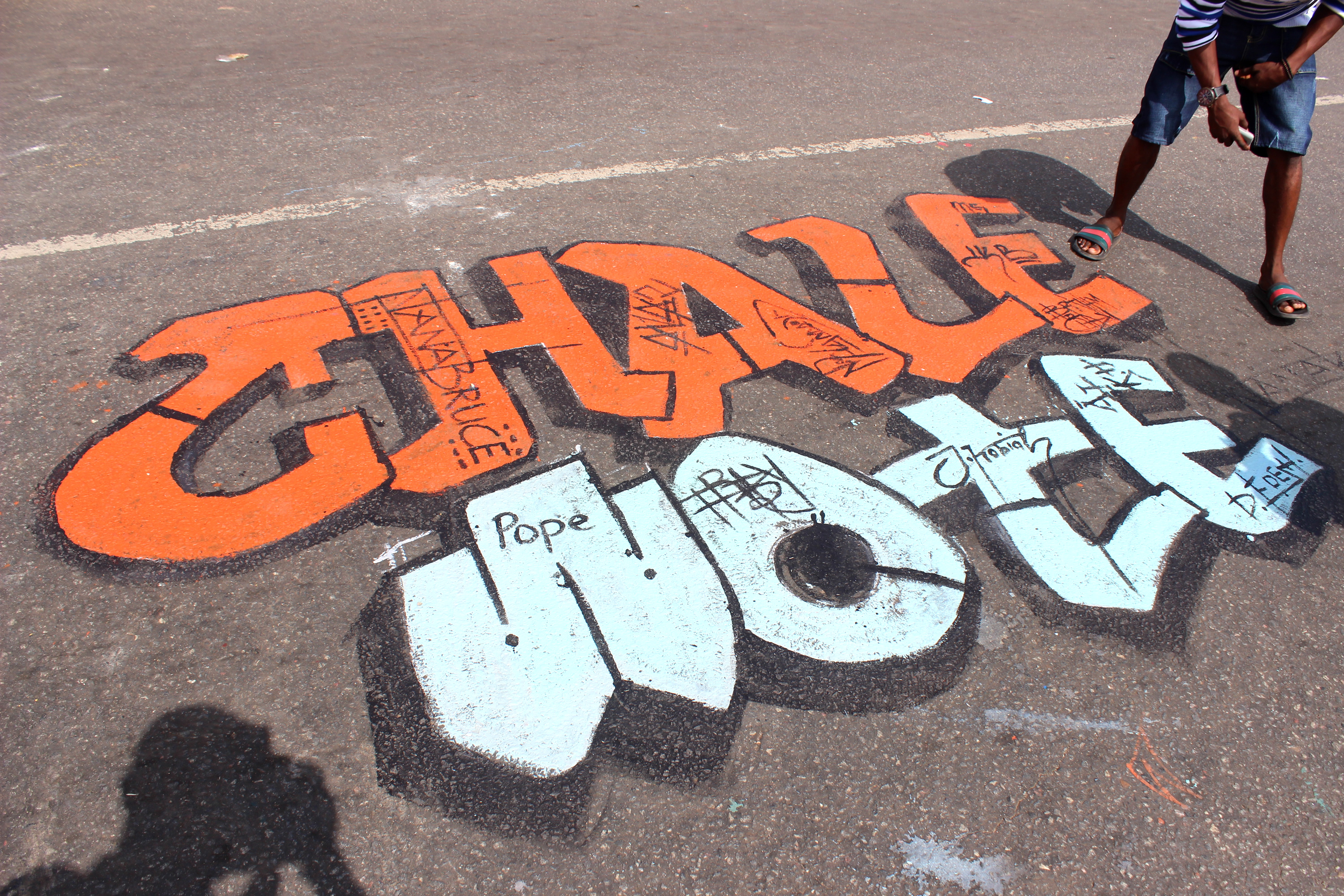
- Location: Accra, Ghana
- Founded: 2011
- Language: International
- Website: Accra Dot Alt Chale Wote Pages

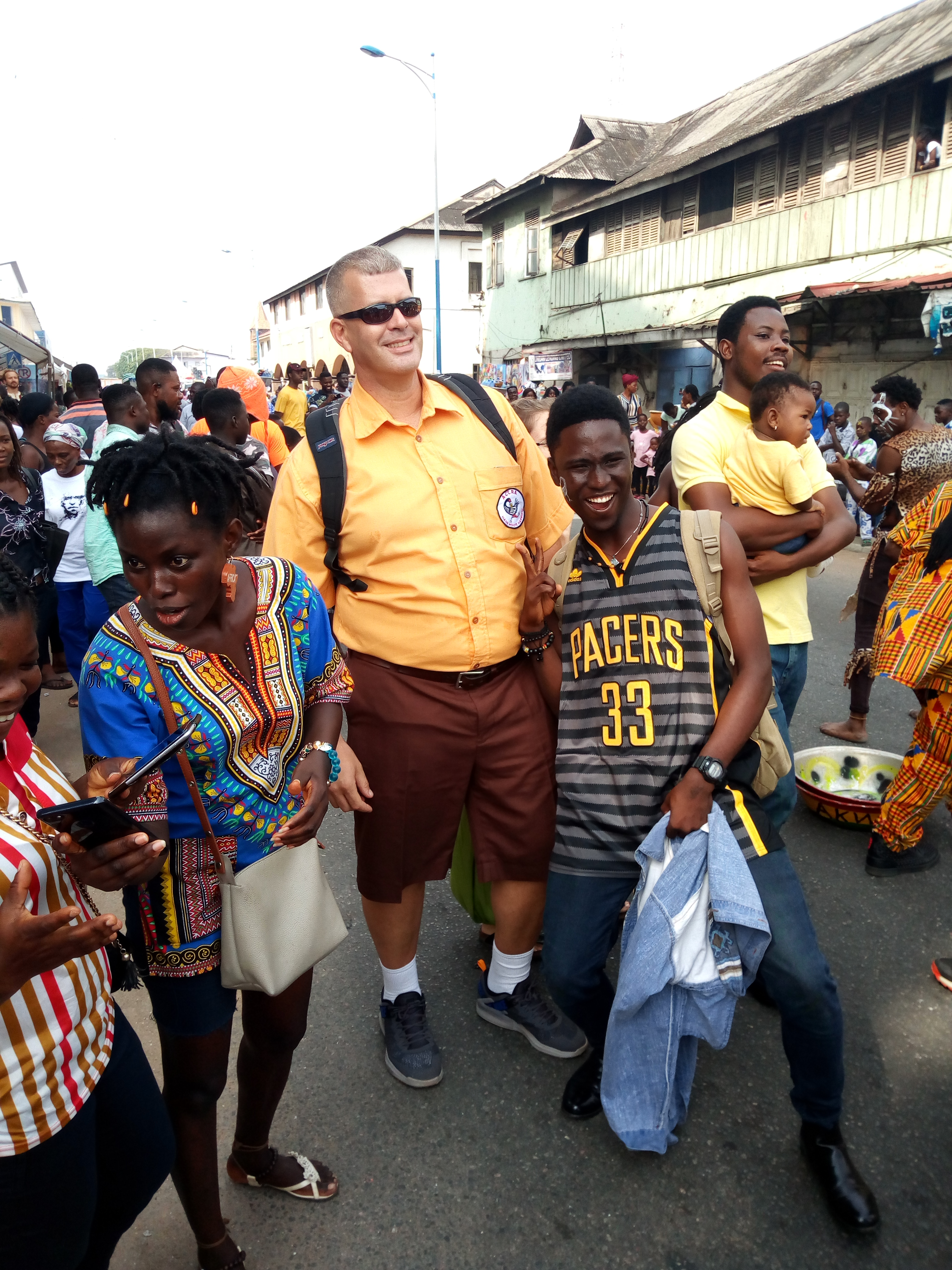
Pidgin Imaginarium 2019

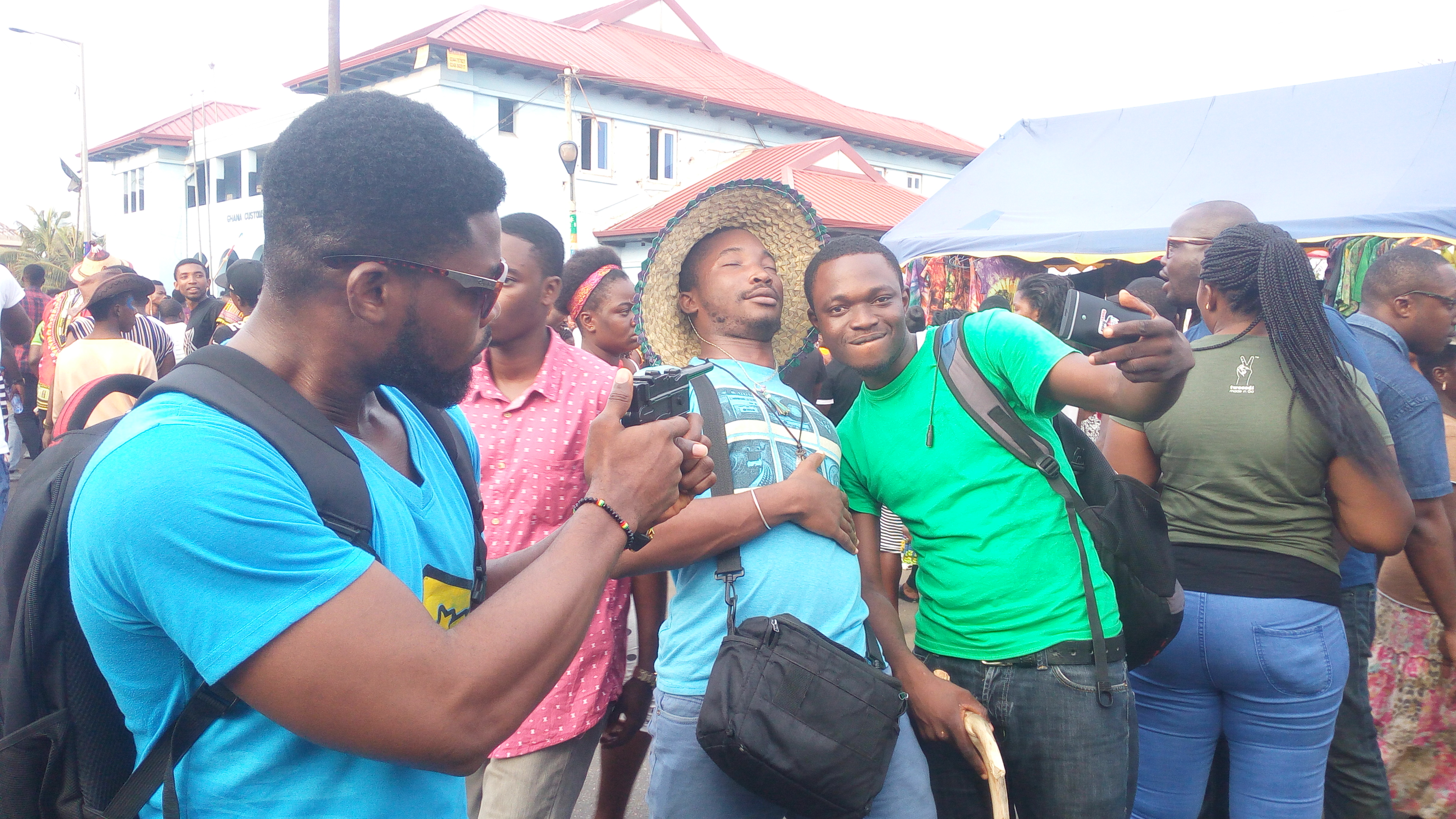
Crowds gather at the 2016 festival

The Chale Wote Street Art Festival also known as Chale Wote, is an annual street festival in Accra, Ghana organized by ACCRA [dot] ALT, in collaboration with Redd Kat Pictures and Chale Wote Street Art Projekt. The festival targets exchanges between scores of local and international artists and patrons. "Chale Wote" in the Ga language means "friend, let's go" and its meaning is derived from a type of flip-flop commonly worn in a household.

== History ==
Since 2011, CHALE WOTE has included street painting, graffiti murals, photography, theater shows dubbed "Na Wo Se Sɛn", spoken word, interactive art installations, live performances, sports, film shows, and other activities. The first two editions ran for one day each, while the 2013 and 2014 editions ran concurrently for two days, the former on 7 and 8 September and the latter on 23 and 24 August, a week after the Homowo festival of the Ga people at the historical Jamestown on the High Street in Accra. The format switched in 2016 when the festival lasted an entire week, from 18 to 21 August, with the theme "Spirit Robot". This switch saw the festival hop from the open street gallery that is Jamestown to other art spaces, such as the Nubuke Foundation, the Museum of Science and Technology, as well as film screenings at the Movenpick Ambassador Hotel Accra. The same format was replicated in the 7th edition, themed Wata Mata, on 14 to 20 August, with further immersion into Accra, spread to areas such as Nima, Osu, and more. The event is produced by Accra [dot] Alt Radio, with support from other local cultural networks like Attukwei Art Foundation, Foundation for Contemporary Art Ghana, Dr. Monk, Redd Kat Pictures, Ministry of Tourism, Arts and Culture, Ghana Tourism Authority, Ghana Museum and Monuments Board and Korley Klottey Municipal Assembly and the Institute français and Lododo Arts in Ghana.

=== Recent editions ===
The most recent and 13th edition of CHALE WOTE started on Monday, 21 August and ended on Sunday, 27 August 2023 in the Greater Accra Region, specifically, Osu, Ghana.

=== Activities ===
List of activities during the street festival.

- Photo Exhibitions
- Street Painting
- Graffiti Murals
- Interactive Installations
- Street Boxing
- Movie Screening
- Procession of Cultures
- Design Labs
- Movie Screenings

== Gallery ==
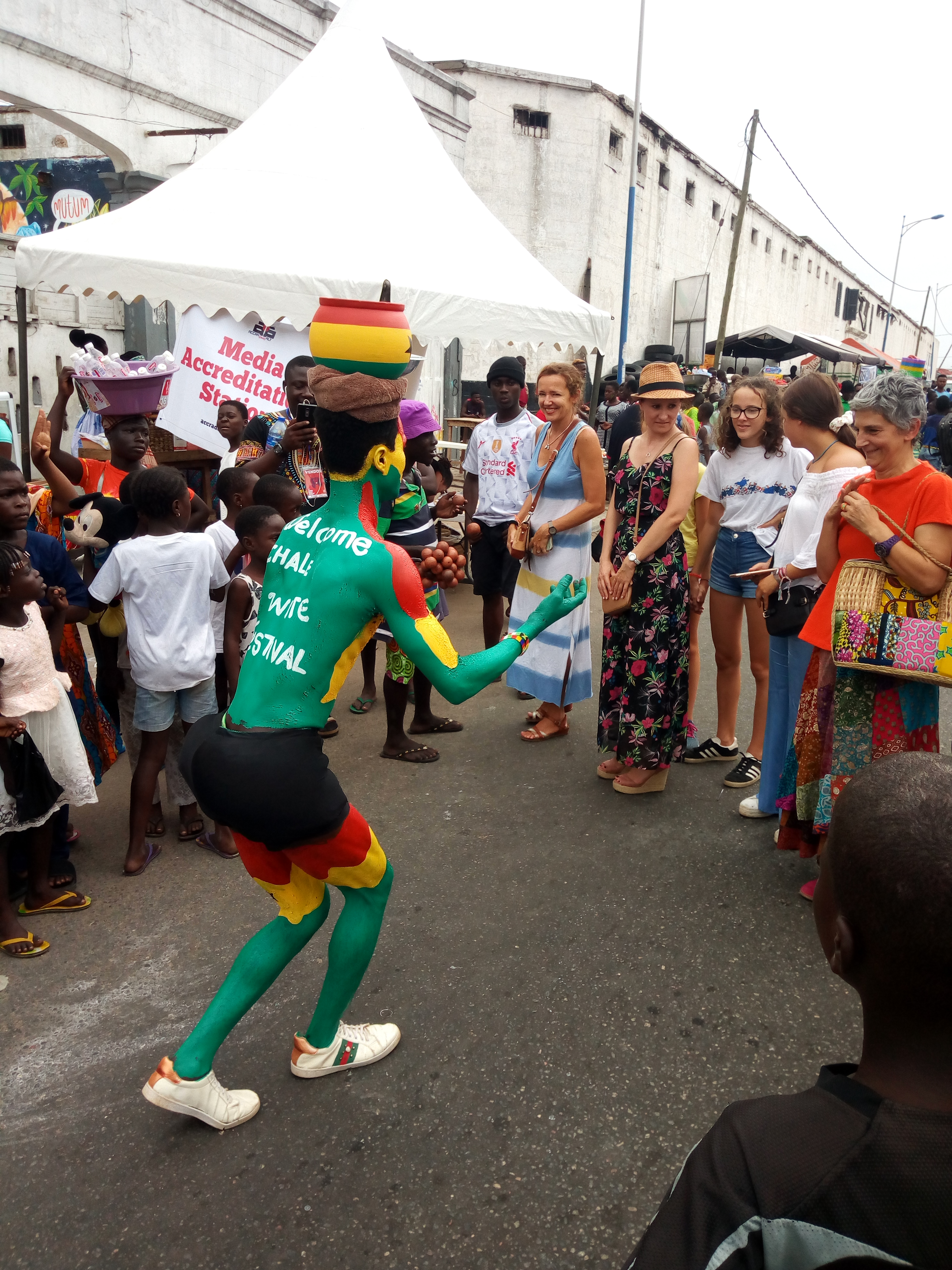
Chale Wote Street Art Festival Celebration

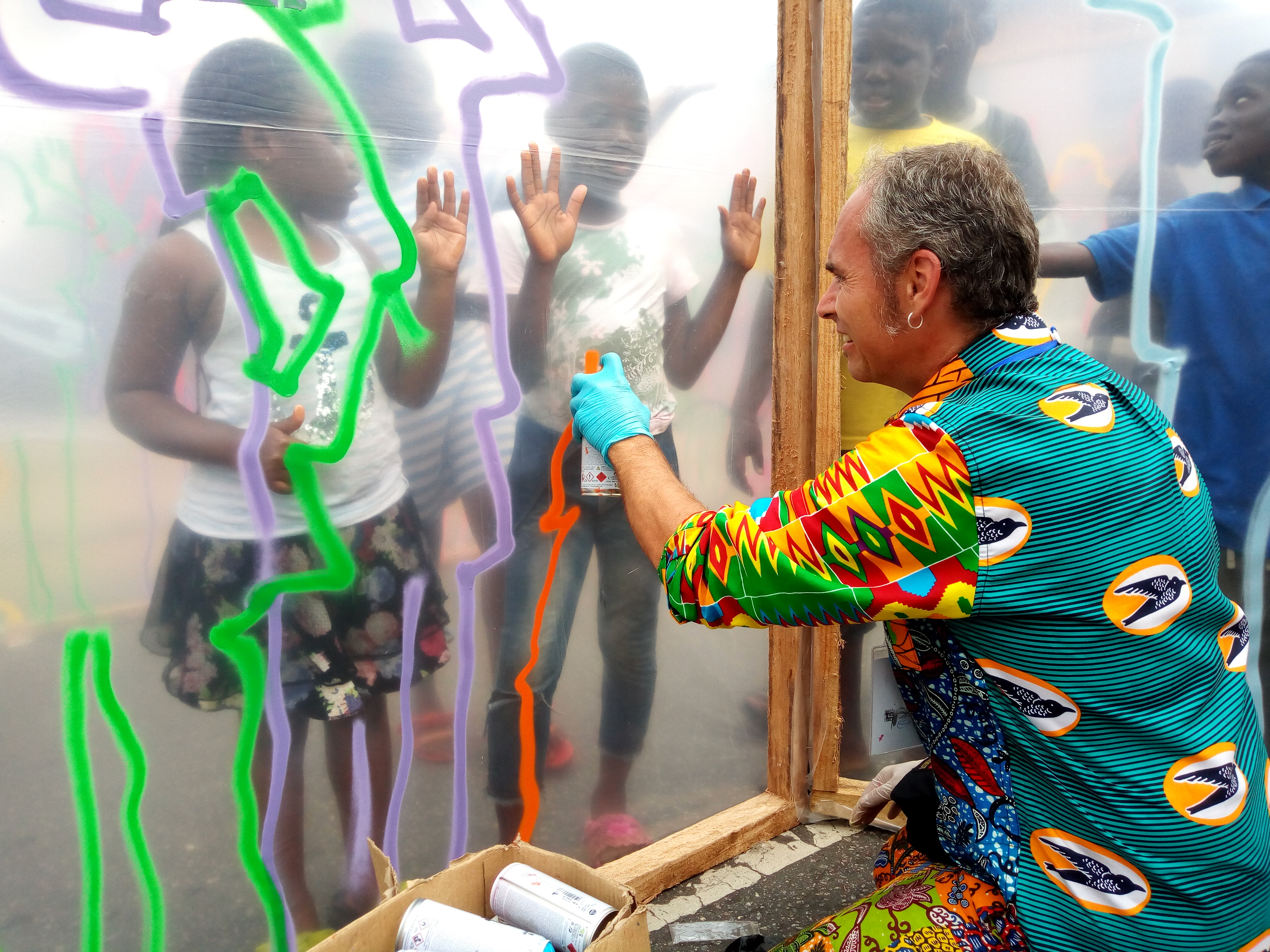
Chale Wote Street Arts

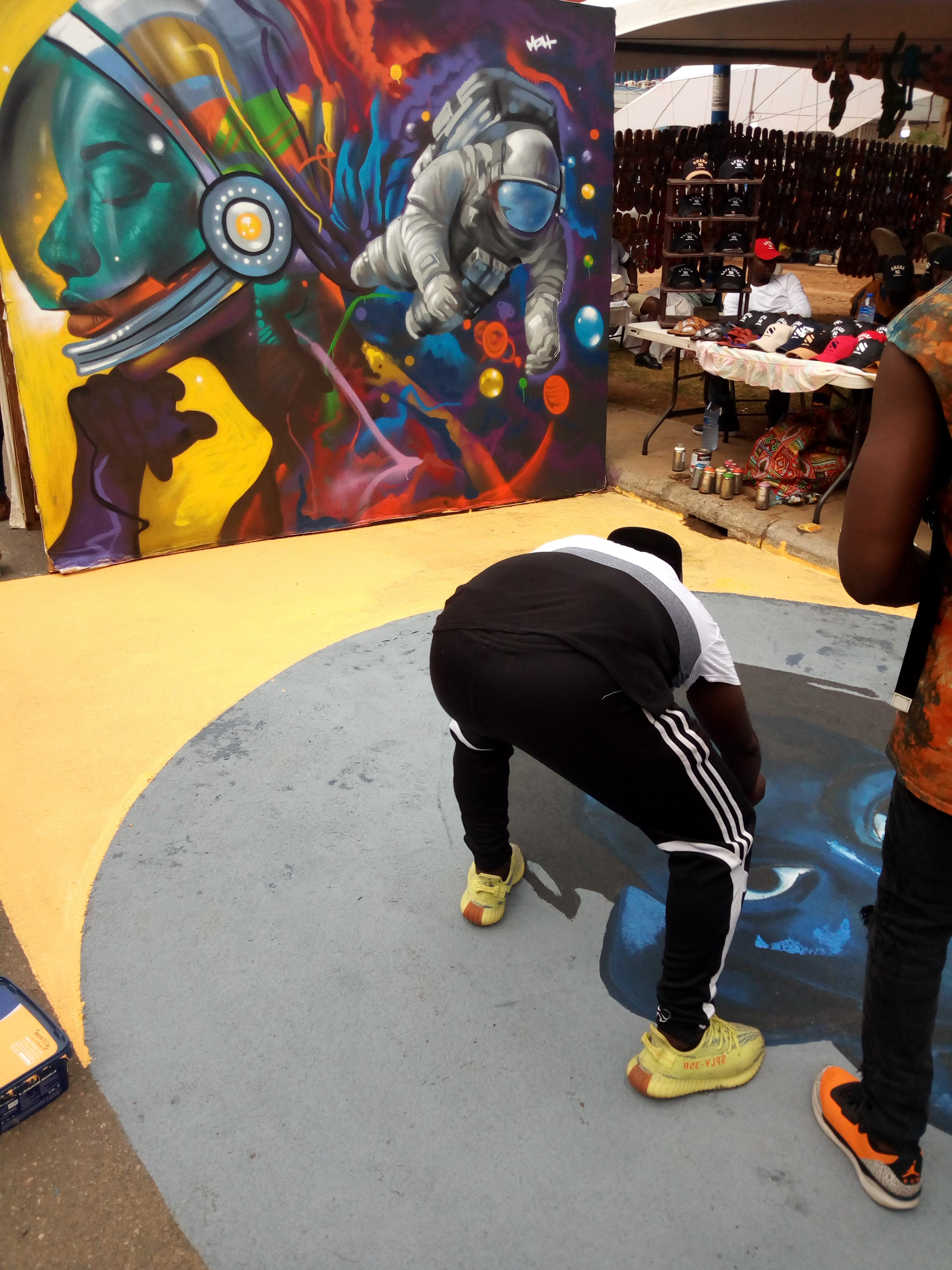
Chale Wote Street Arts festival

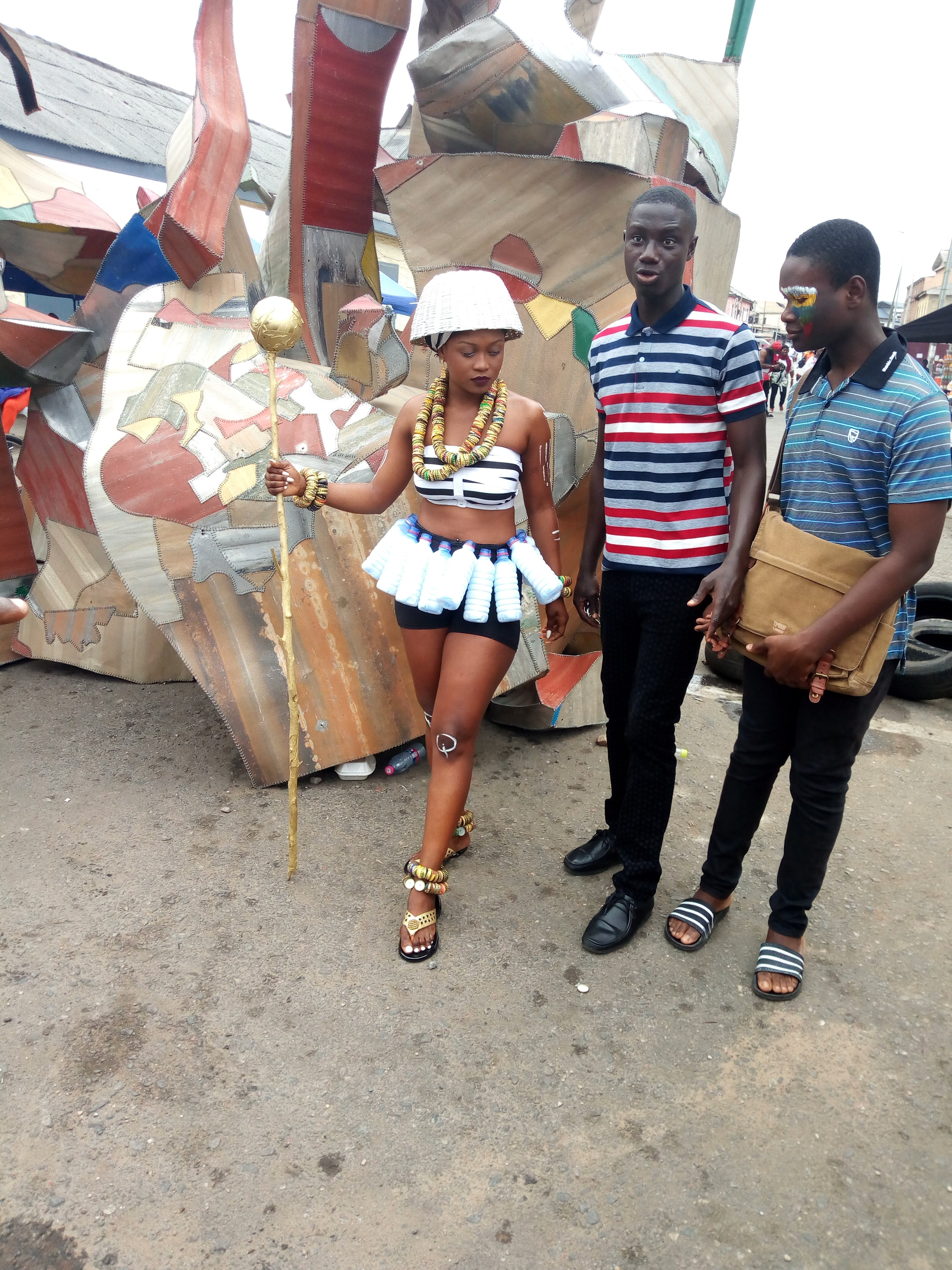
Chale Wote Street Arts festival

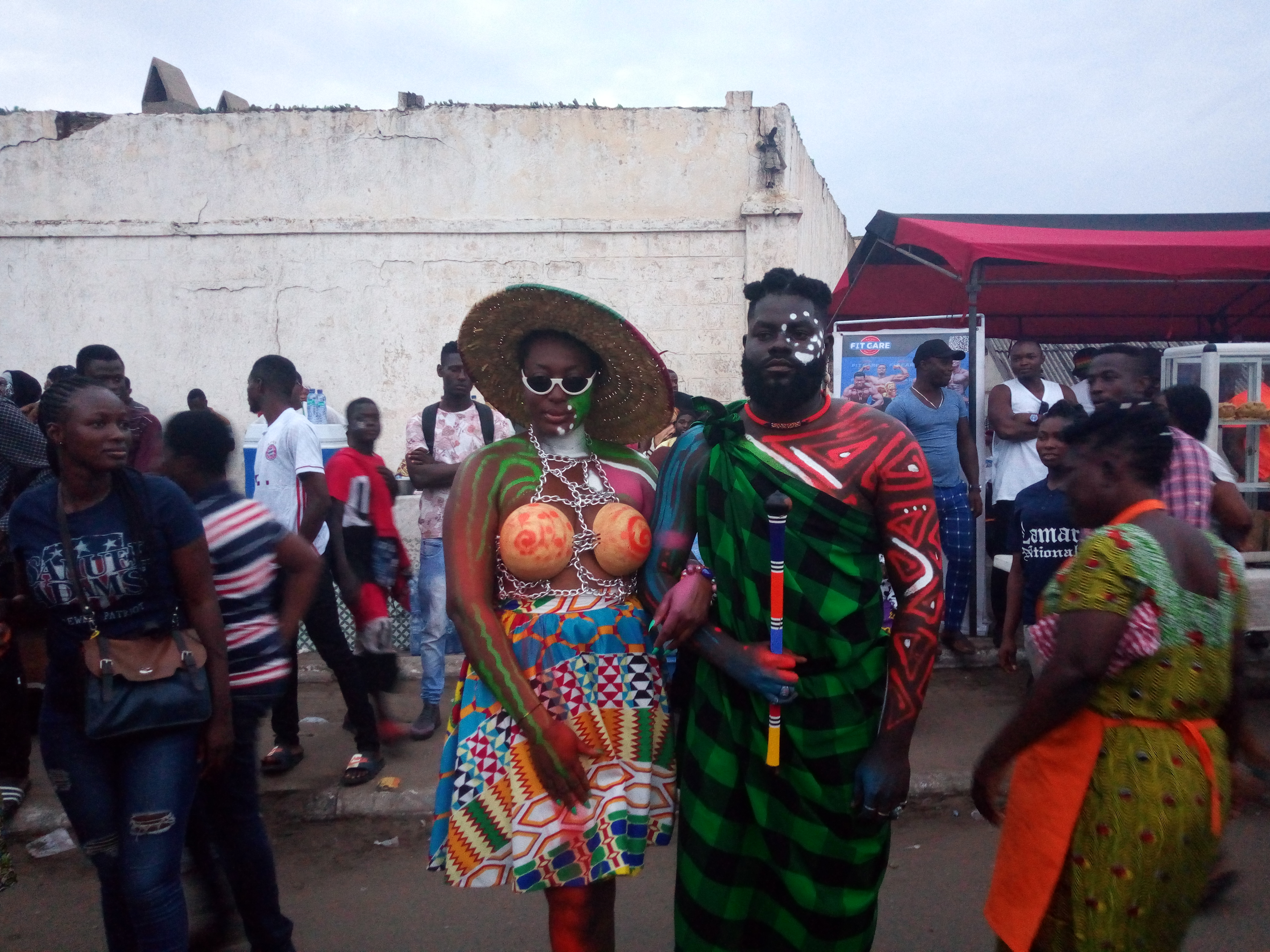
Chale Wote Street Arts festival

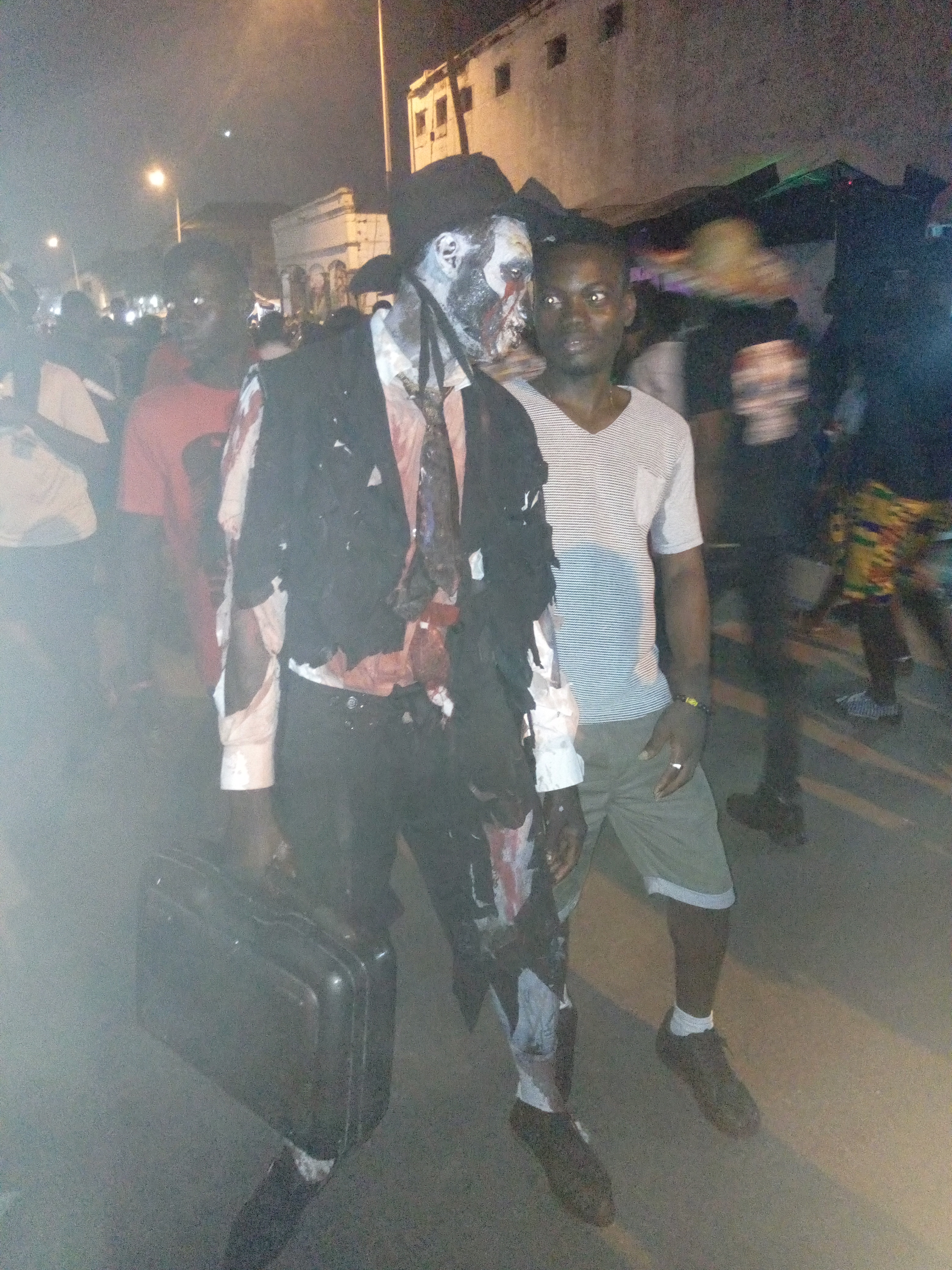
Chale Wote Street Arts festival

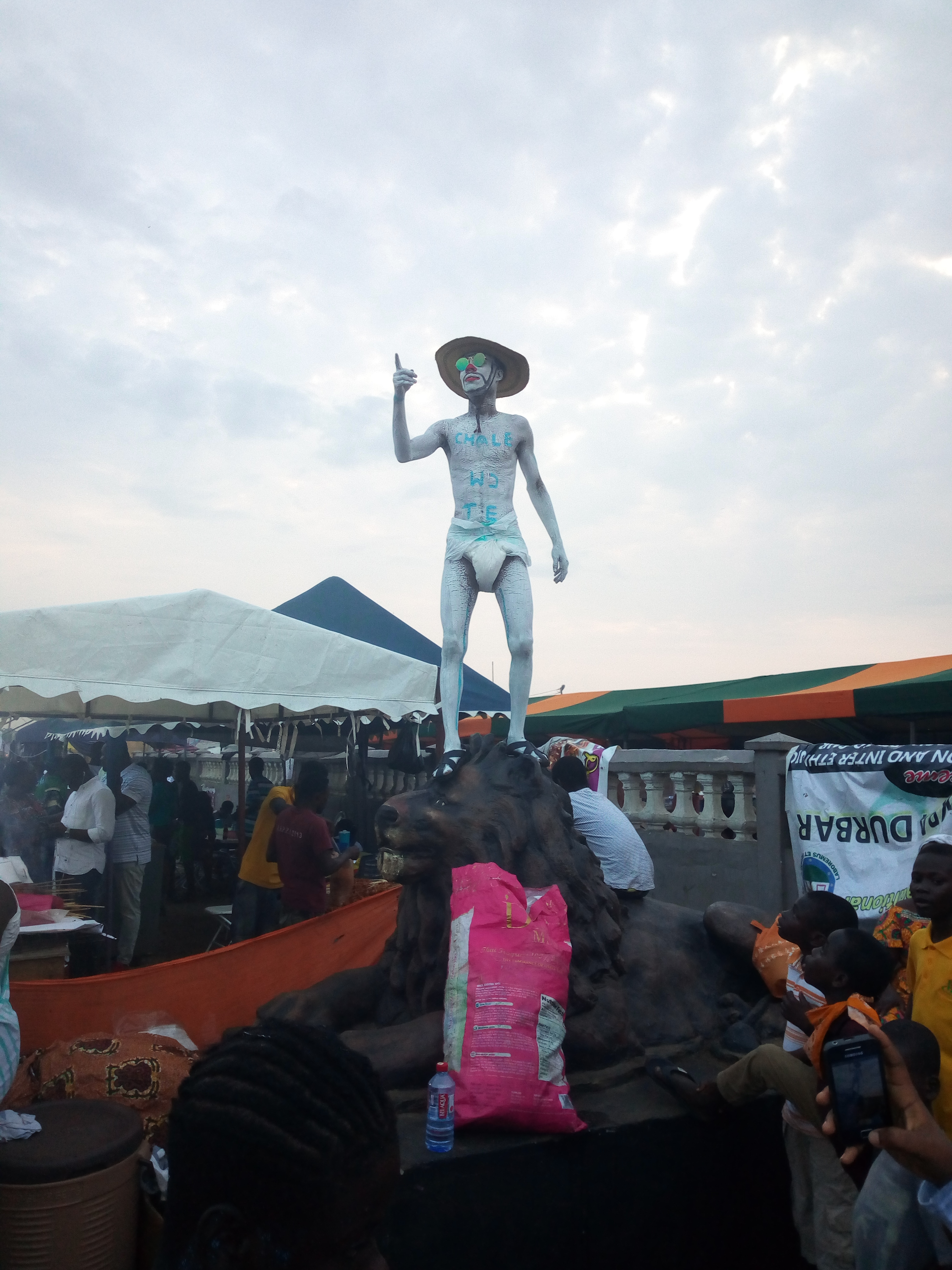
Chale Wote Street Arts festival

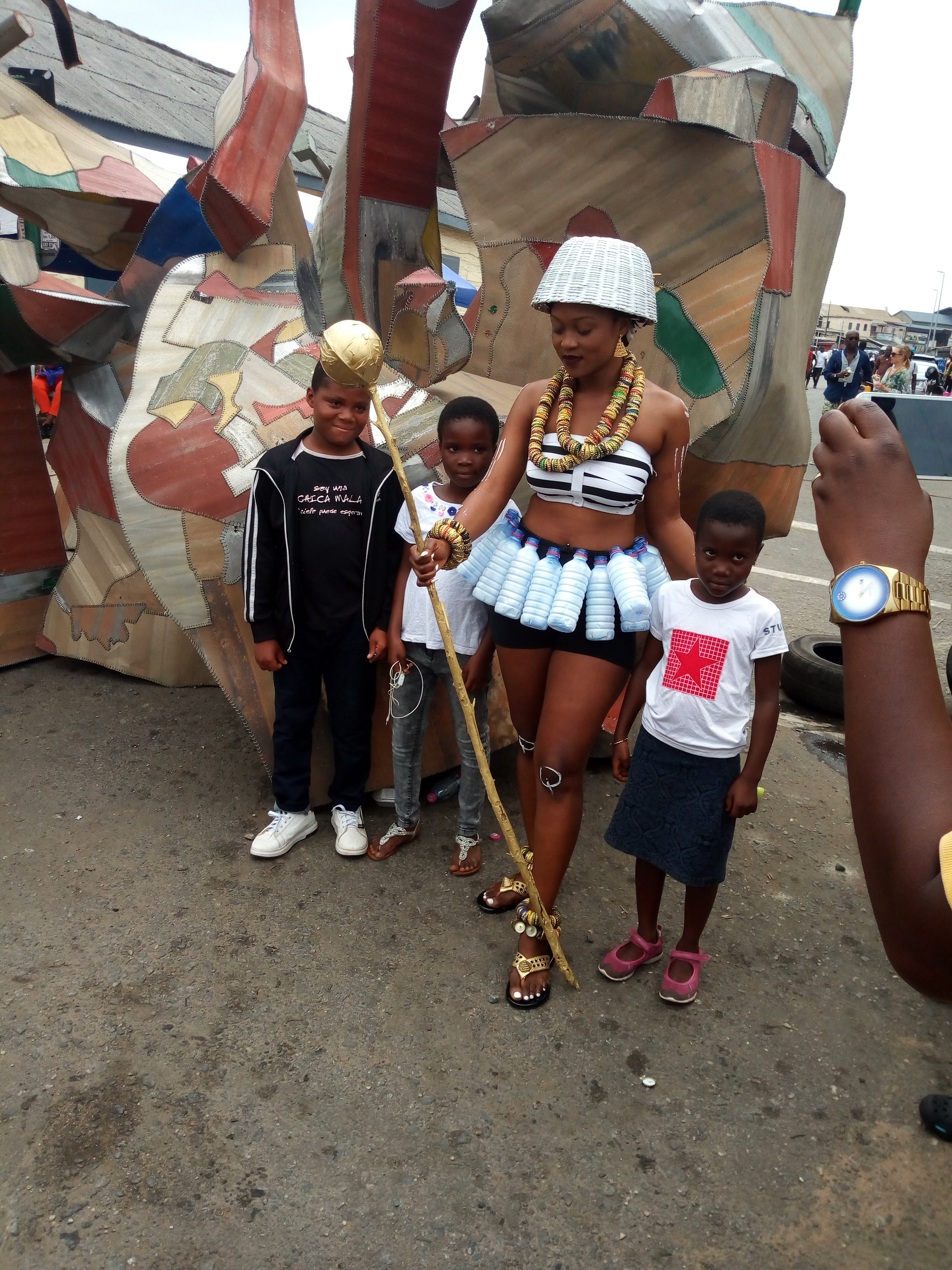
Chale Wote Street Arts festival

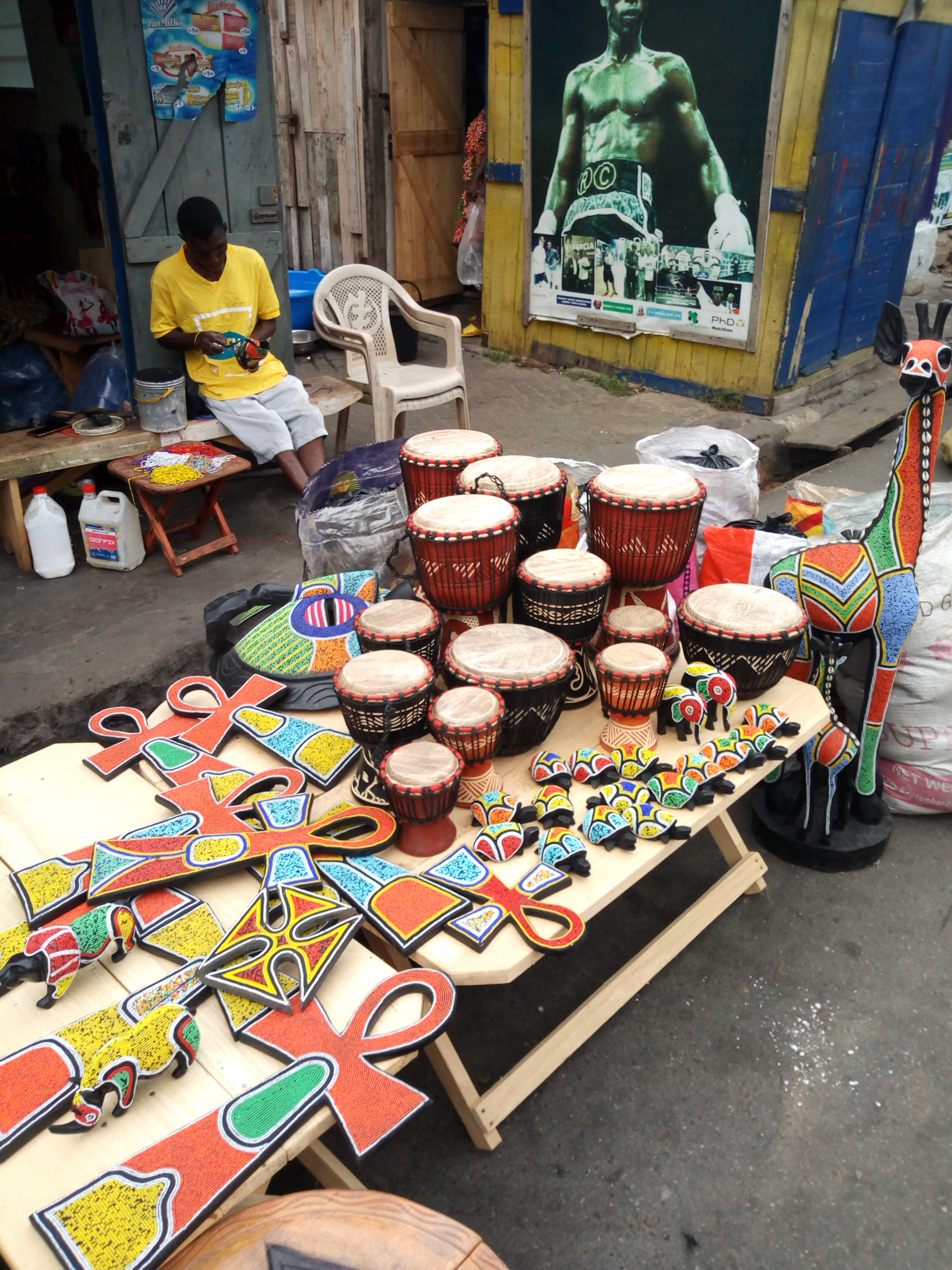
Celebrating culture and arts through chale wote street arts festival

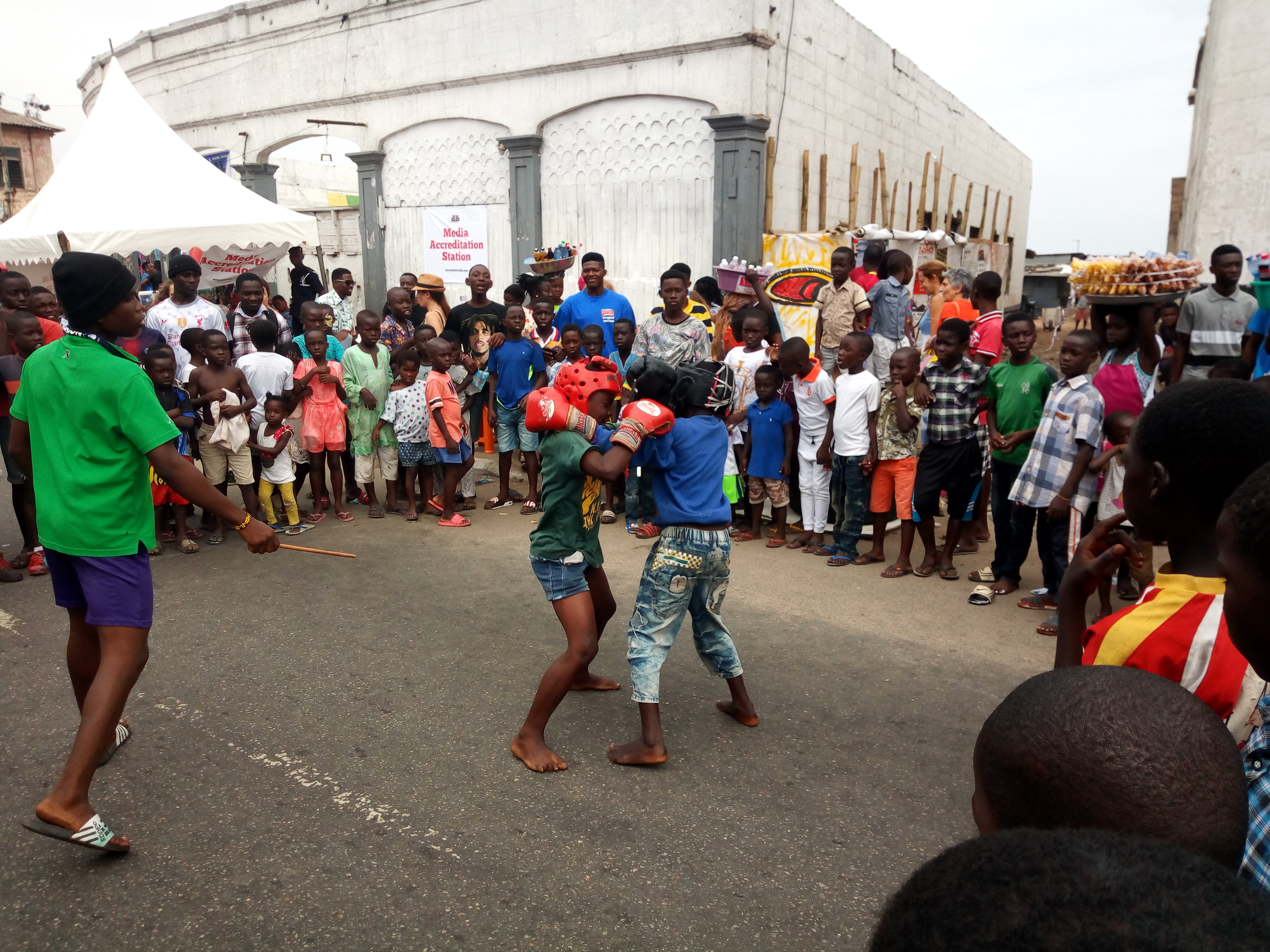

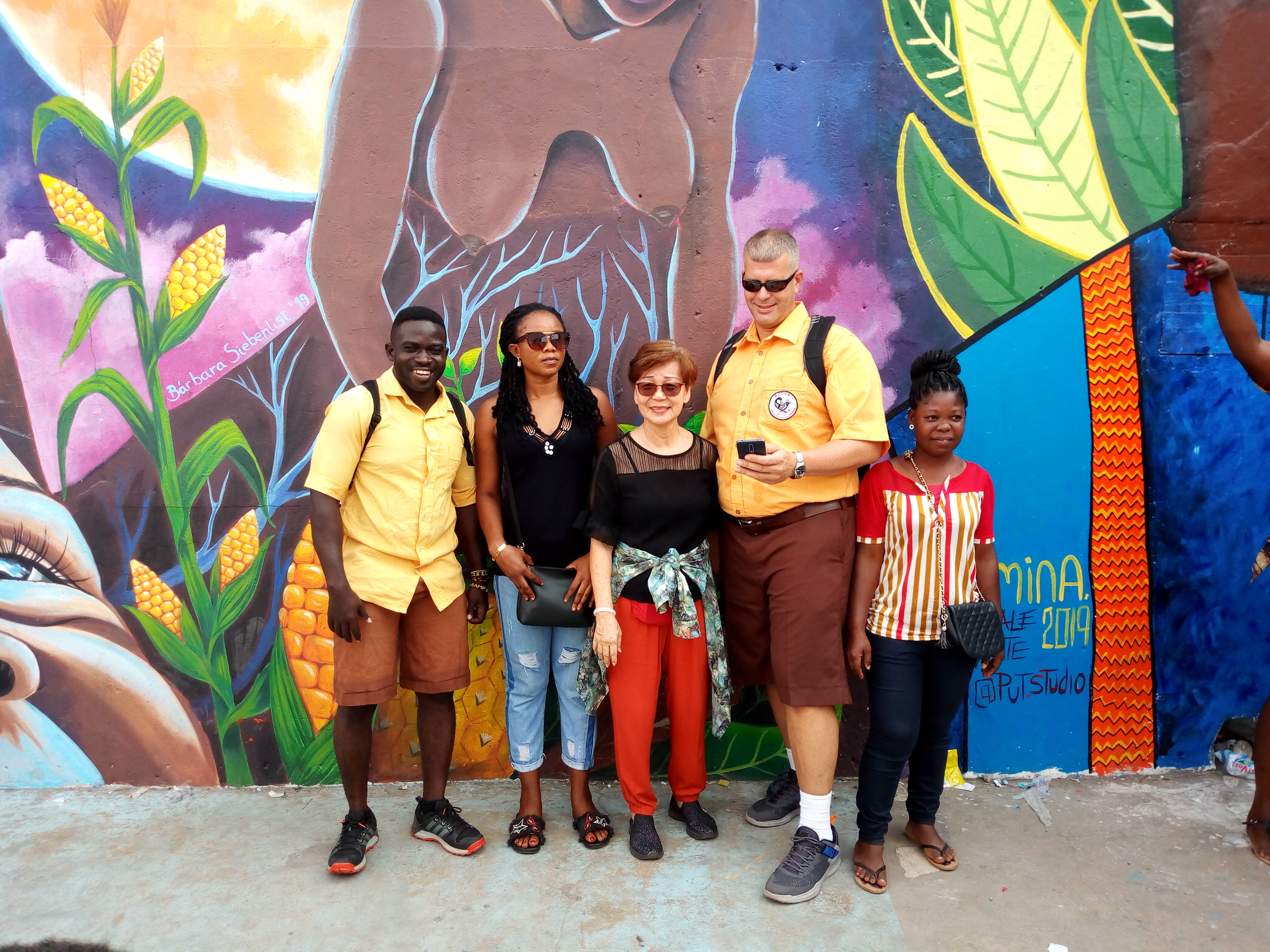

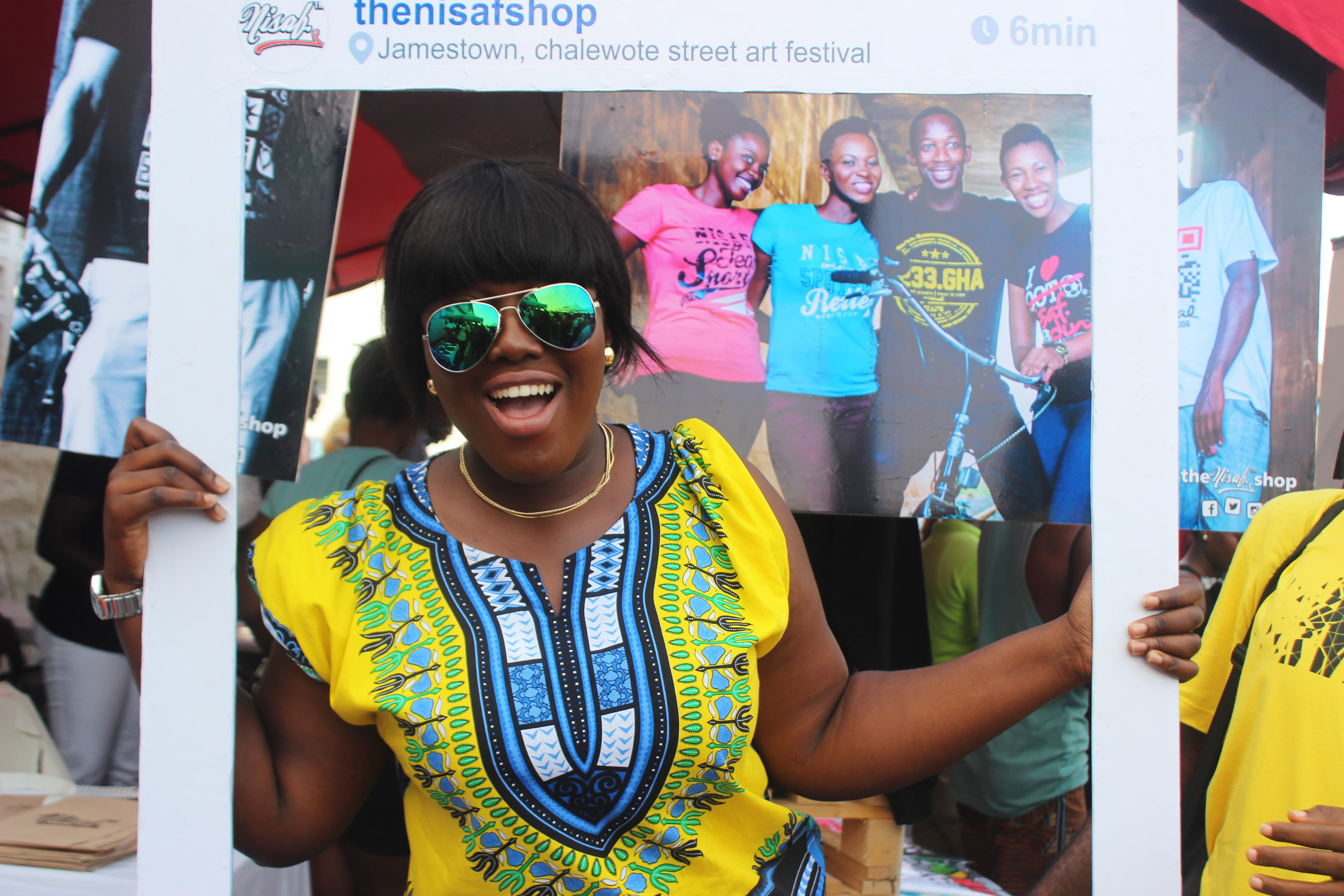
Young Ghanaian ladies having fun at Chale Wote Street Art Festival

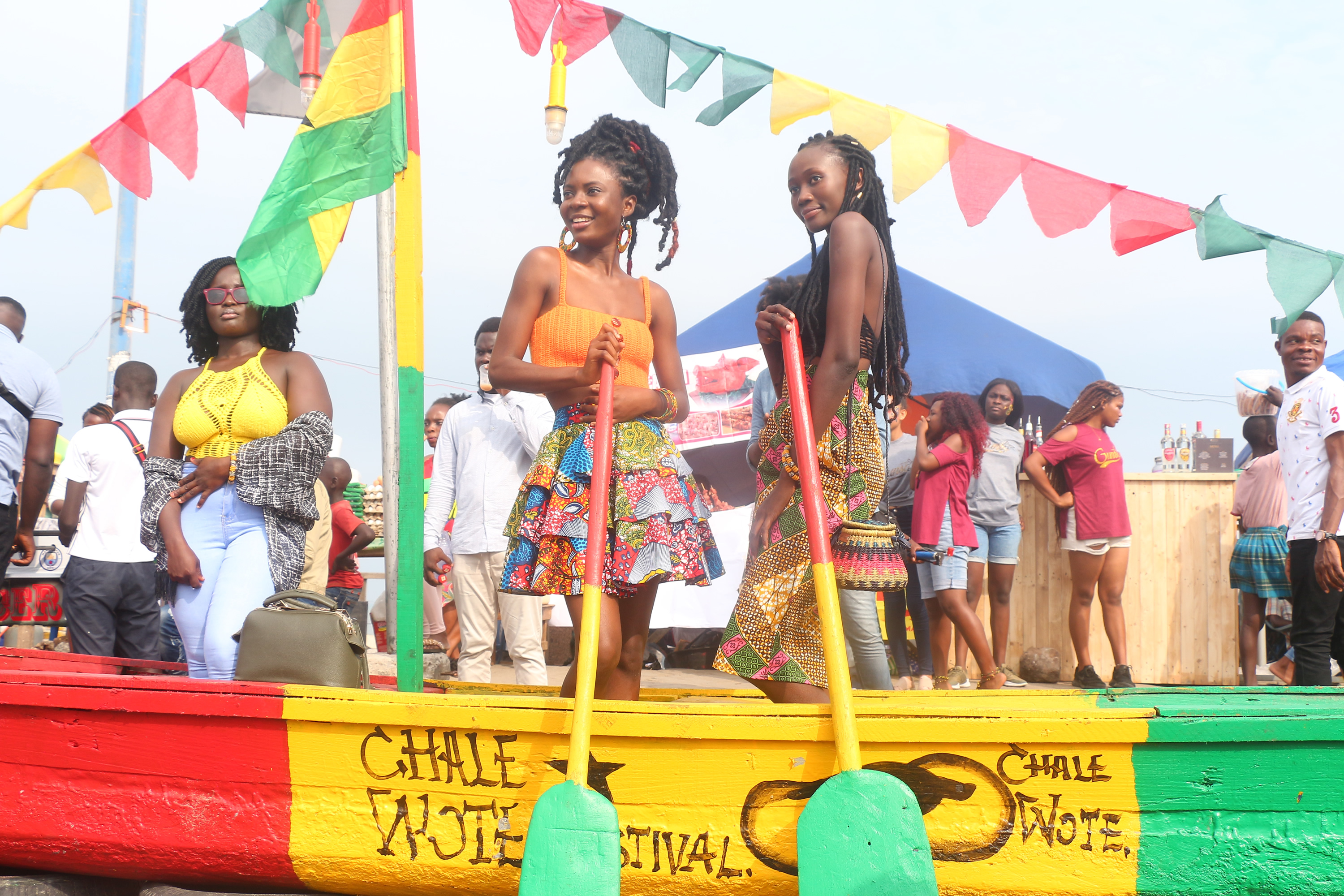
Young Ghanaian ladies having fun at Chale Wote Street Art Festival

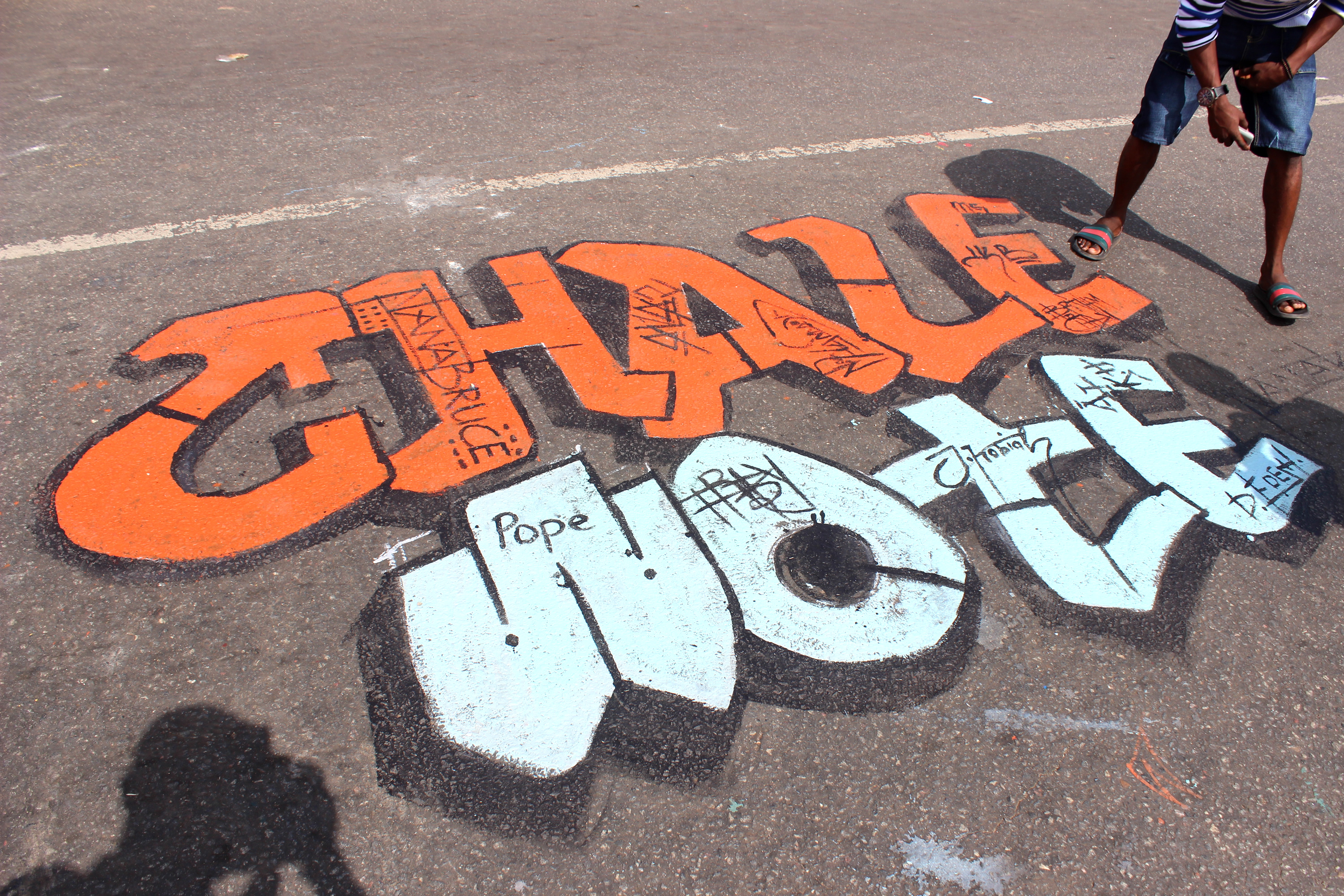
Chale Wote Street Art Festival

Year	Theme	Date	Reference
2011	Promote the appreciation of diverse forms of art in Ghana	16 July	
2012	"Outer-space” exploration	14 April	
2013	Re-imagining African folklore by creating exciting and futuristic versions	7–8 September	
2014	Death: An Eternal Dream Into Limitless Rebirth	23–24 August	
2015	African Electronics	22–23 August	
2016	Spirit Robot	18–21 August	
2017	Wata Mata	14–20 August	
2018	Para Other	20–26 August	
2021	10 years of existence since its launch (Virtual event)	13–22 August	
2023	Magneto Motherland	27–29 August	
2024	And Now An End To The Empire Of Horrors	19 - 25 August	
