= Jamestown Lighthouse =

Lighthouse in Accra, Ghana

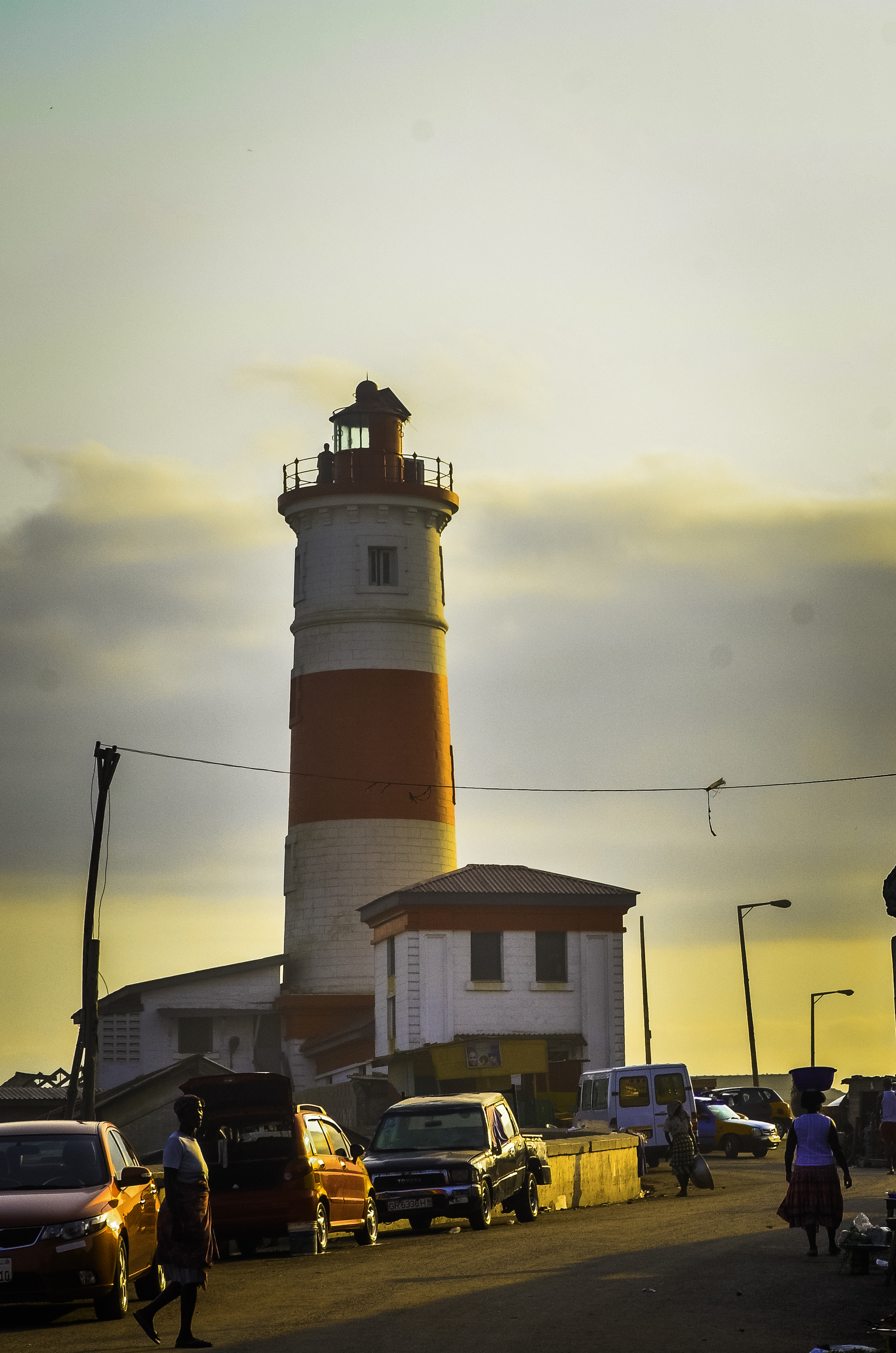
- Jamestown Lighthouse, Accra
- Location: Jamestown, Accra, Greater Accra Region
- Coordinates: 5.5331°N 0.2122°W

Tower
- Constructed: 1932 (replacing 1871 structure)
- Foundation: Stone
- Construction: Stone and concrete
- Automated: Yes (modern)
- Height: 28 m (approx.)
- Shape: Cylindrical tower with lantern
- Markings: Red and white horizontal bands
- Operator: Ghana Ports and Harbours Authority

Light
- Focal height: 35 m above sea level
- Lens: Originally oil lamp; modernized with electric light
- Range: 10 nautical miles (approx.)
- Characteristic: Fl W 10s (one white flash every 10 seconds)

Jamestown Lighthouse is a lighthouse located in the Jamestown district of Accra, Ghana. Standing approximately 28 meters tall, the lighthouse was constructed in the early 1930s to replace an earlier 1871 structure, and has served as a key navigational aid for vessels entering the port of Accra.

== History ==
The original Jamestown Lighthouse was erected in 1871 as a navigational aid. By the 1930s, increasing maritime traffic necessitated a larger and more modern structure. The current lighthouse was constructed in 1932, maintaining the original site and orientation.

=== Architecture and design ===
Jamestown Lighthouse features a cylindrical stone tower attached to a keeper's house. It is painted in distinctive red and white horizontal bands, with a lantern and gallery at the top. The focal height is about 35 meters above sea level, allowing the light to be seen up to 10 nautical miles.

== Gallery ==
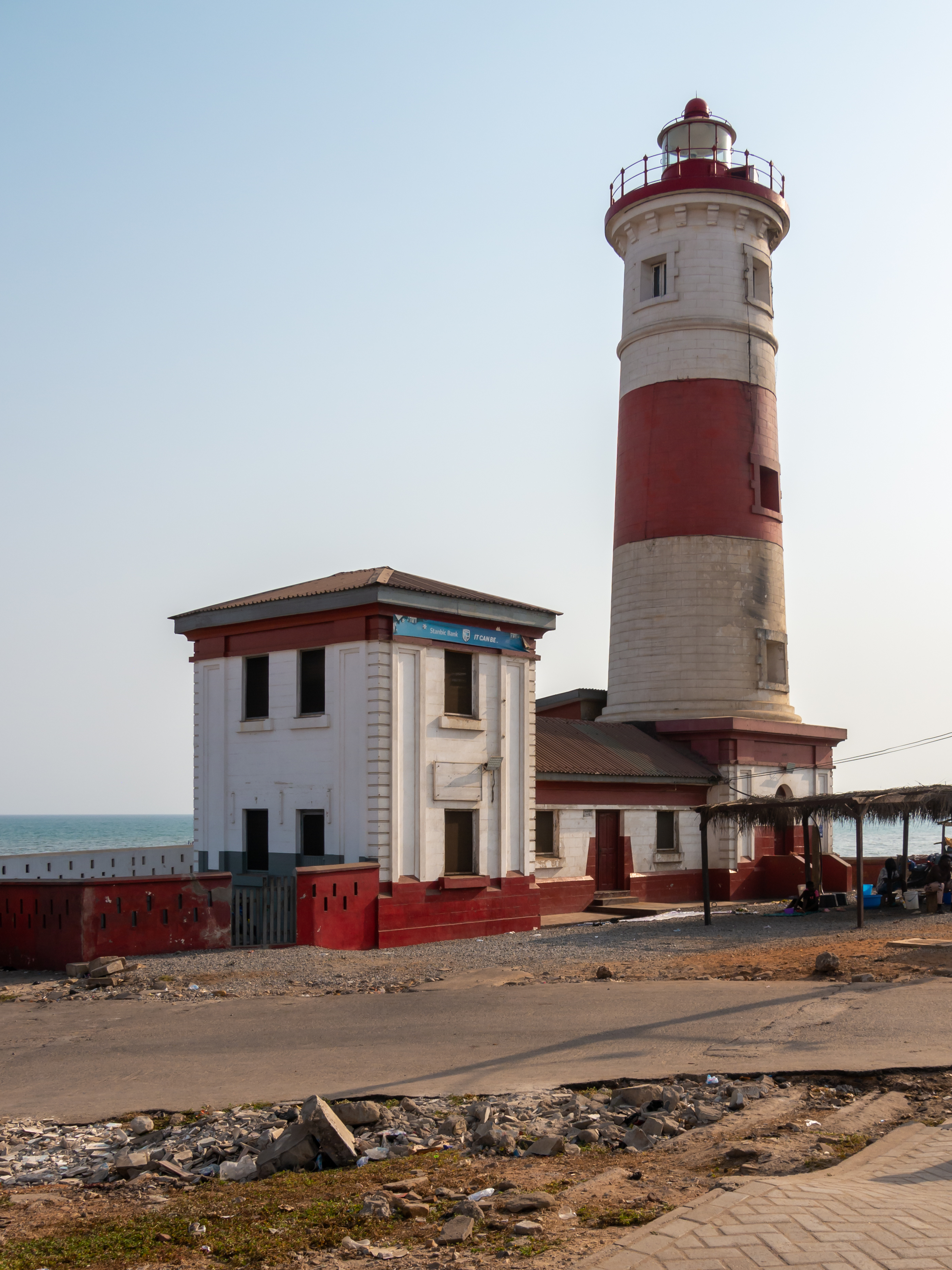
Frontal view of Jamestown Lighthouse

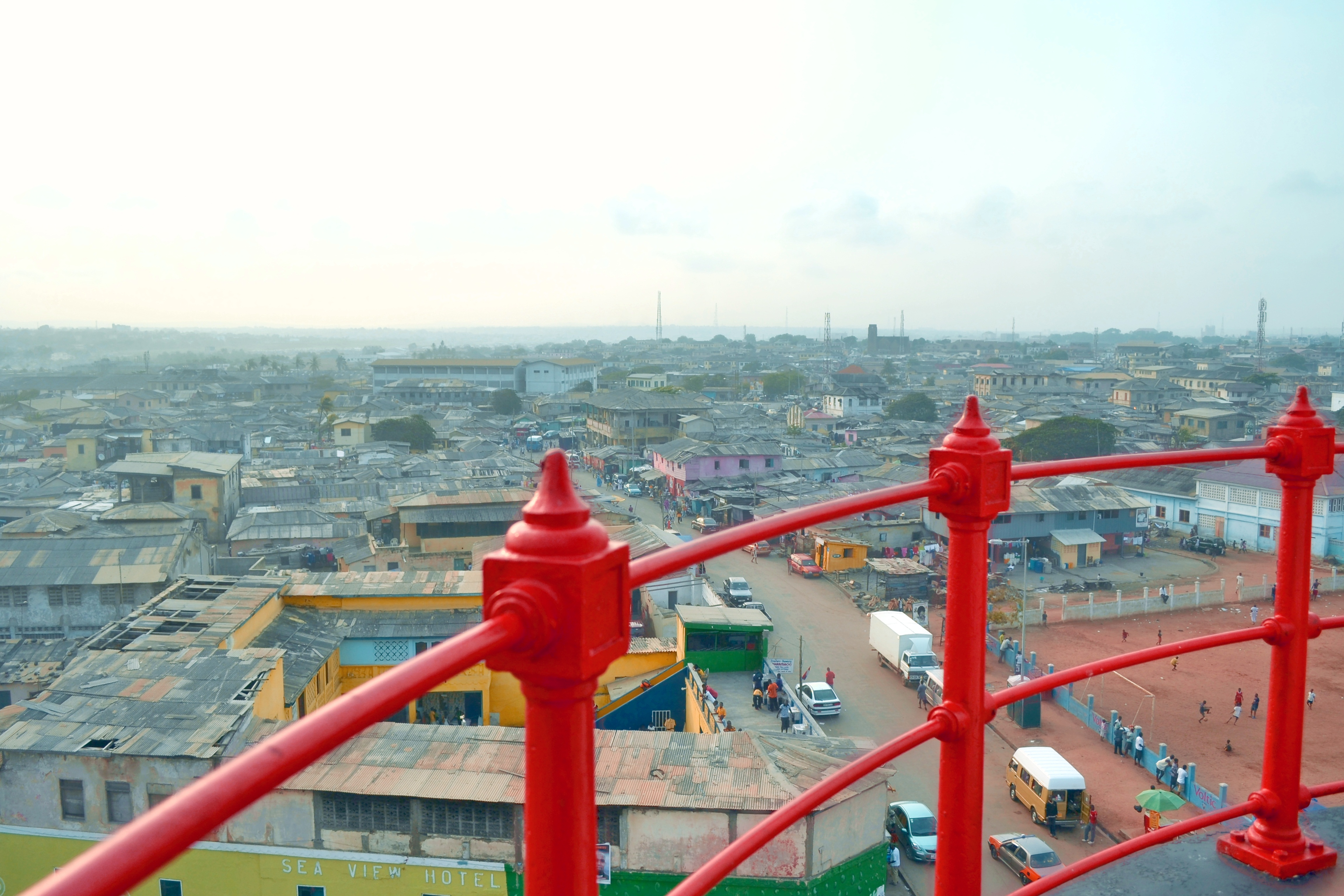
View from the top towards the Gulf of Guinea

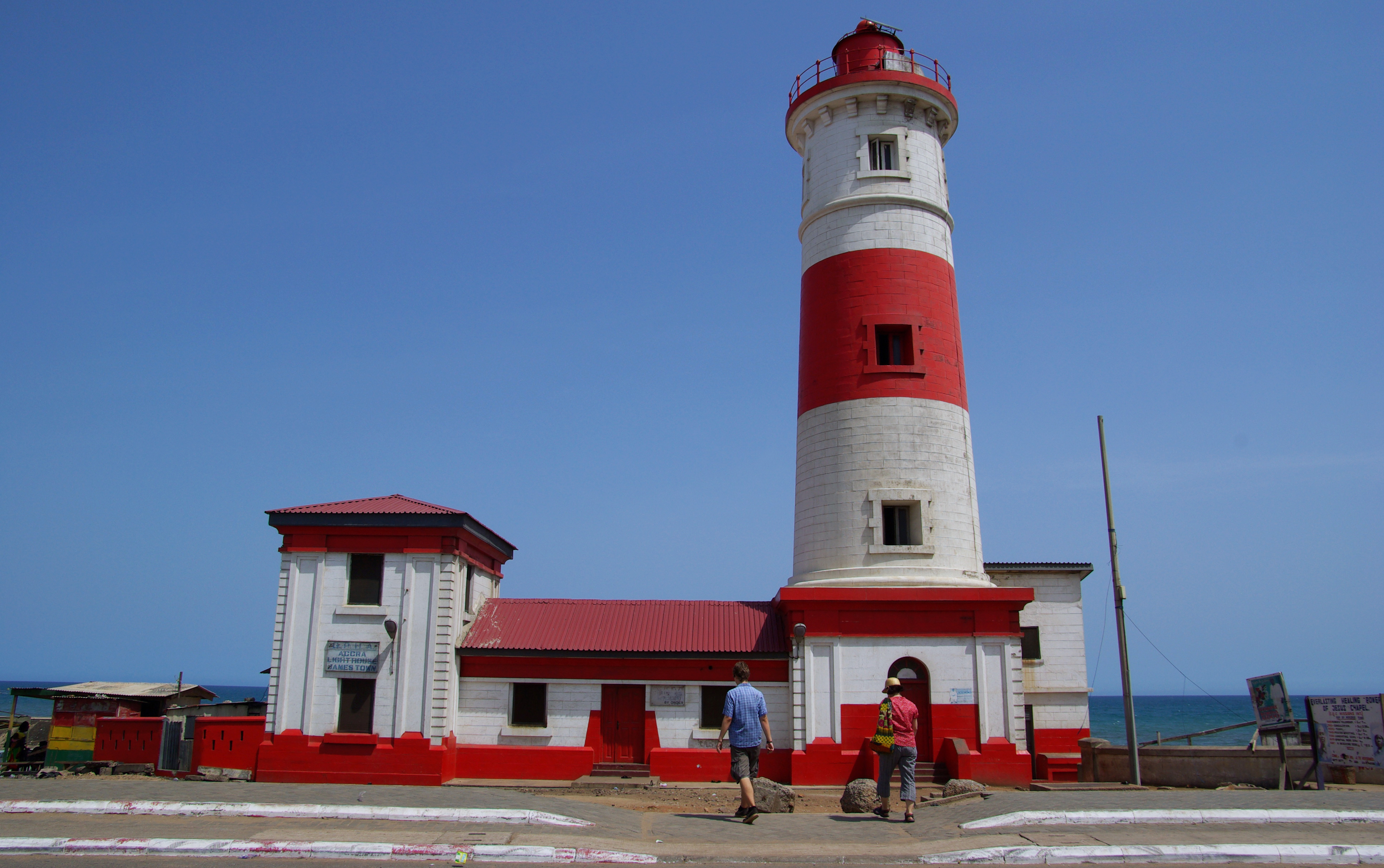
View of the lighthouse

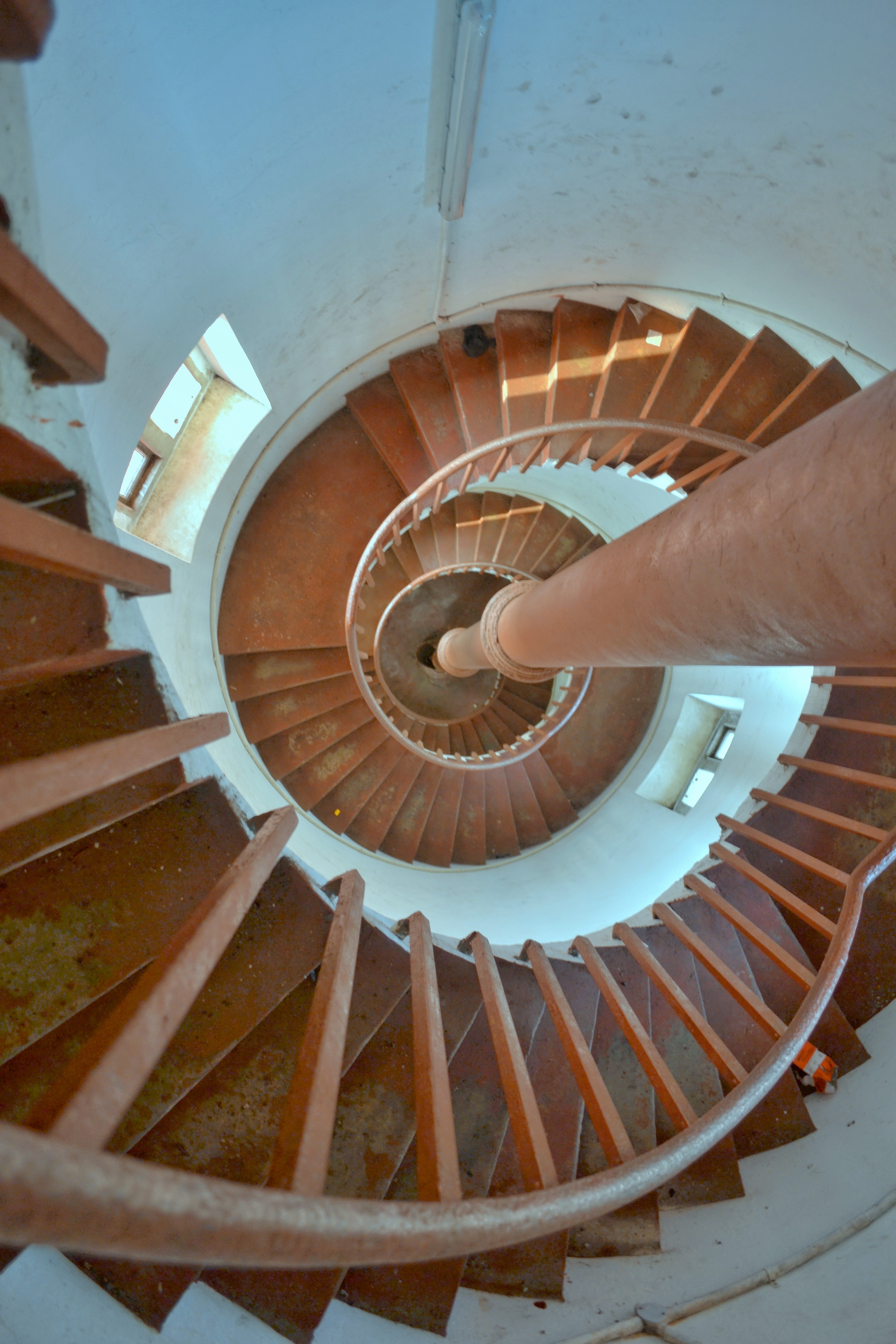
Interior of the lighthouse

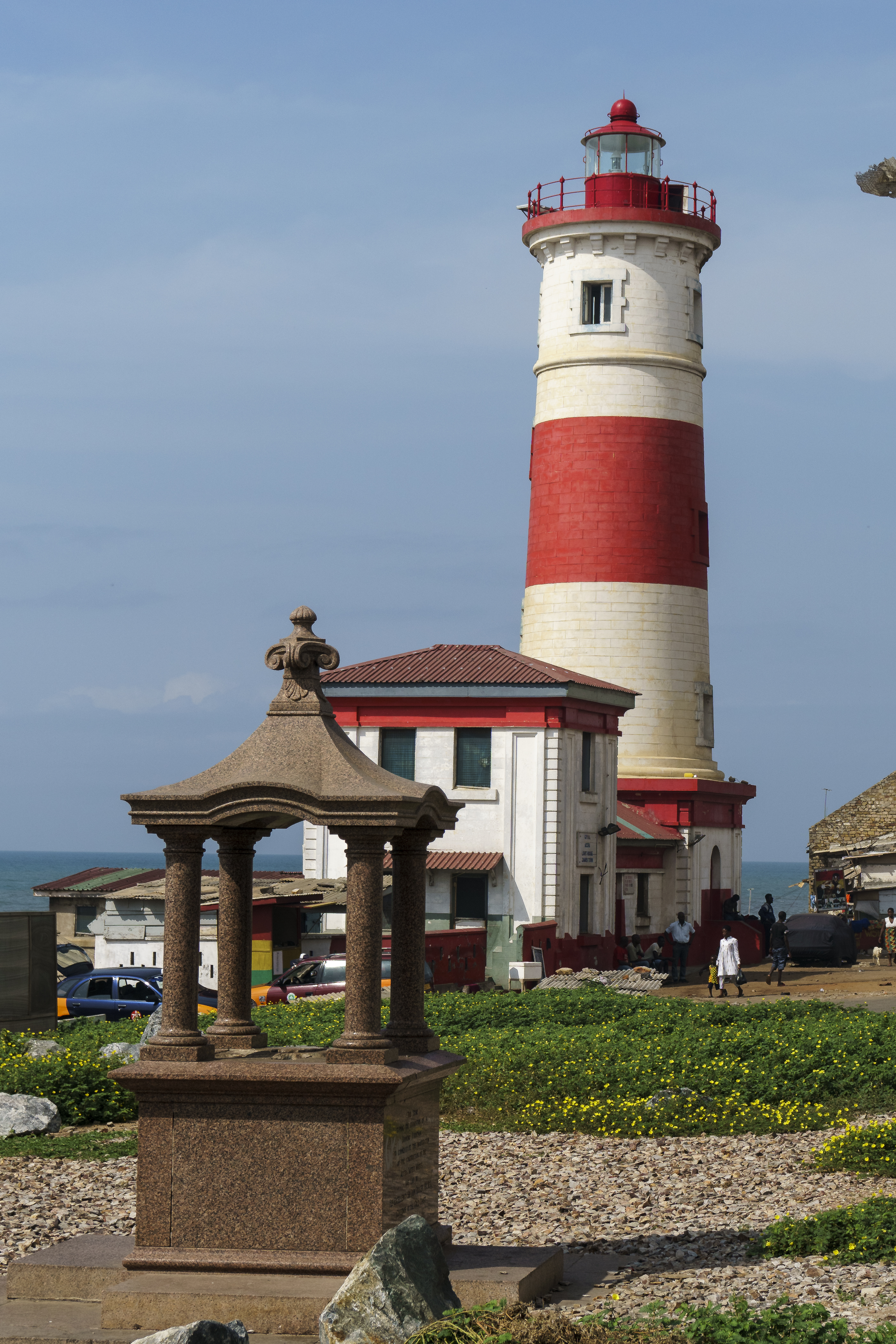
General perspective of the lighthouse in 2017

== See also ==
- List of lighthouses in Ghana
