= Jamestown/Usshertown, Accra =

Suburb of Accra

Jamestown/Usshertown Districts (Old Accra)
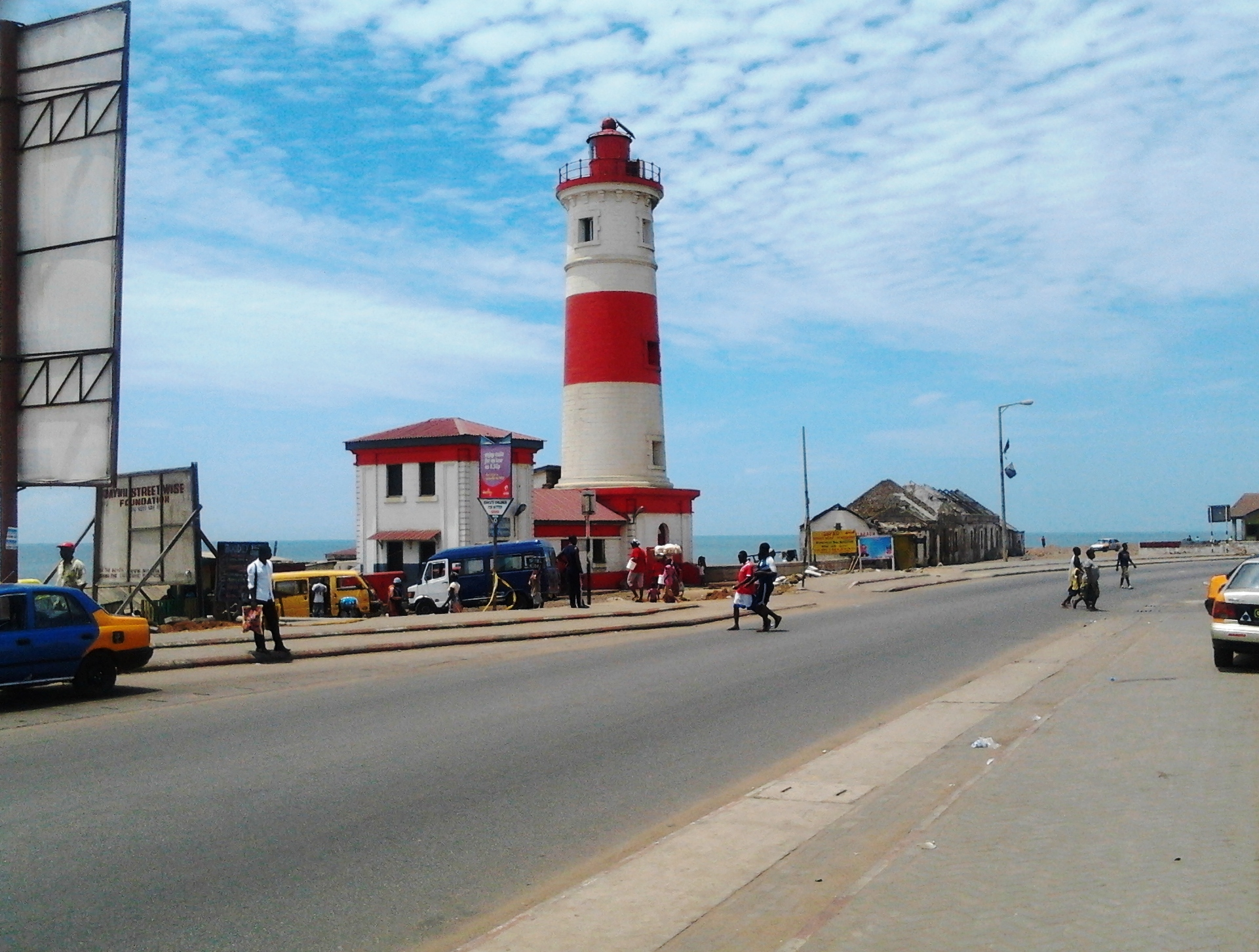
- Location: Jamestown; Roughly: W: Korle Lagoon; E: Kwame Nkrumah Avenue; N: Accra Railway Station; S: Gulf of Guinea Usshertown; Roughly: W: Kwame Nkrumah Avenue; N: Kinbu Road; E: Kojo Thompson Road; S: Gulf of Guinea

Site notes
- Governing body: Accra Metropolitan Assembly

Located directly east of the Korle Lagoon, Jamestown and Usshertown are the oldest districts of Accra, Ghana and emerged as communities around the 17th century British James Fort and Dutch Ussher Fort on the Gulf of Guinea coast. These districts were developed at the end of the 19th century, and following the rapid growth of the city during the 20th century, they became areas of a dense mixture of commercial and residential use.

== History ==
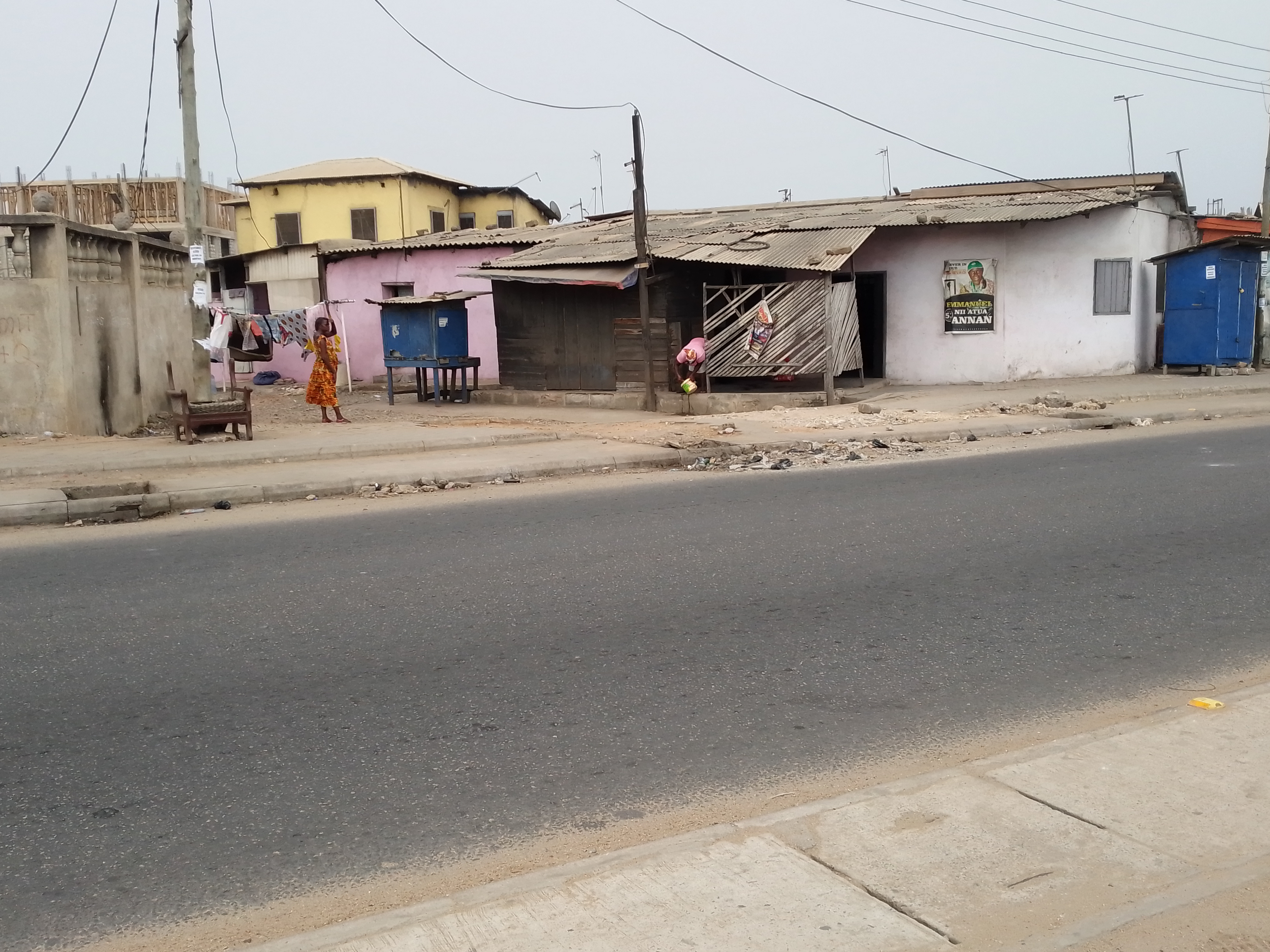
Houses in Jamestown

Today, both Jamestown and Usshertown remain fishing communities inhabited primarily by the Ga. Although in a state of decay, the districts are significant in the history of Accra, which replaced Cape Coast as the capital of Gold Coast (British colony) in 1876. The original lighthouse, built at James Fort in 1871, was replaced in the 1930s by the current tower, which is 28 m (92 ft) tall. The lighthouse, which is 34 metres (112 ft) above sea level, has a visibility of 16 nautical miles (30 km), it overlooks the harbour, James Fort, the Bukom district and Ussher Fort.

Since World War II, a succession of plans to enhance the capital city have come with changes in government, some seeing improvements in Jamestown as a necessary part of the overall plan, and some treating such improvements as competing with the efforts to develop the central business district of Accra farther north. Currently, plans are afoot to re-develop the districts of Jamestown and Usshertown, referred to as "Ga-Mashie" with the inauguration of the 2015 Old Accra Strategy. The popular Azonto dance originated from Jamestown. The local language "Ga" is often spoken by the natives.

Areas of Jamestown and Usshertown include Bukom, known for its boxing gyms; Adedainkpo, former home of the wealthiest African residents of Accra; Swalaba; Korle Woko (formerly also known as Ripponville); and Akoto Lante.

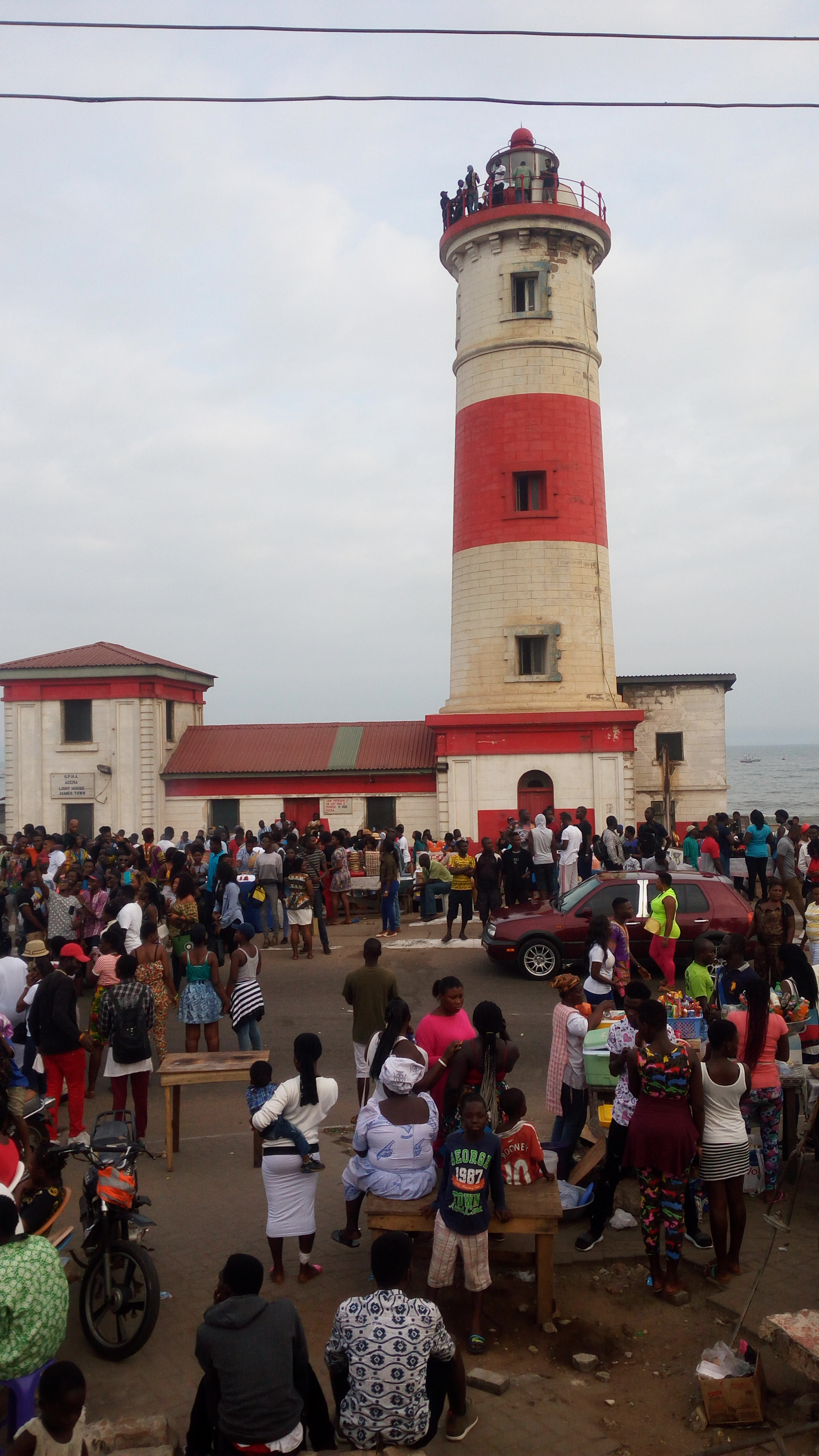
People around Jamestown lighthouse tower during Chale Wote festival

Jamestown hosts the annual Chale Wote Street Art Festival.

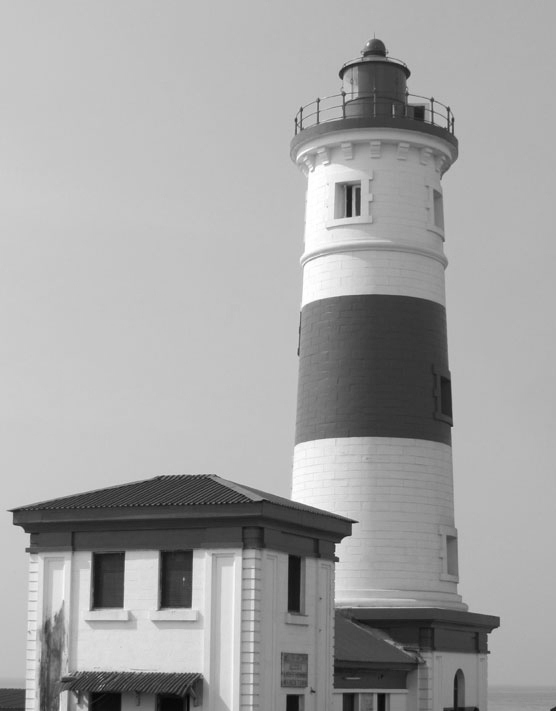
Jamestown lighthouse in Accra's Jamestown

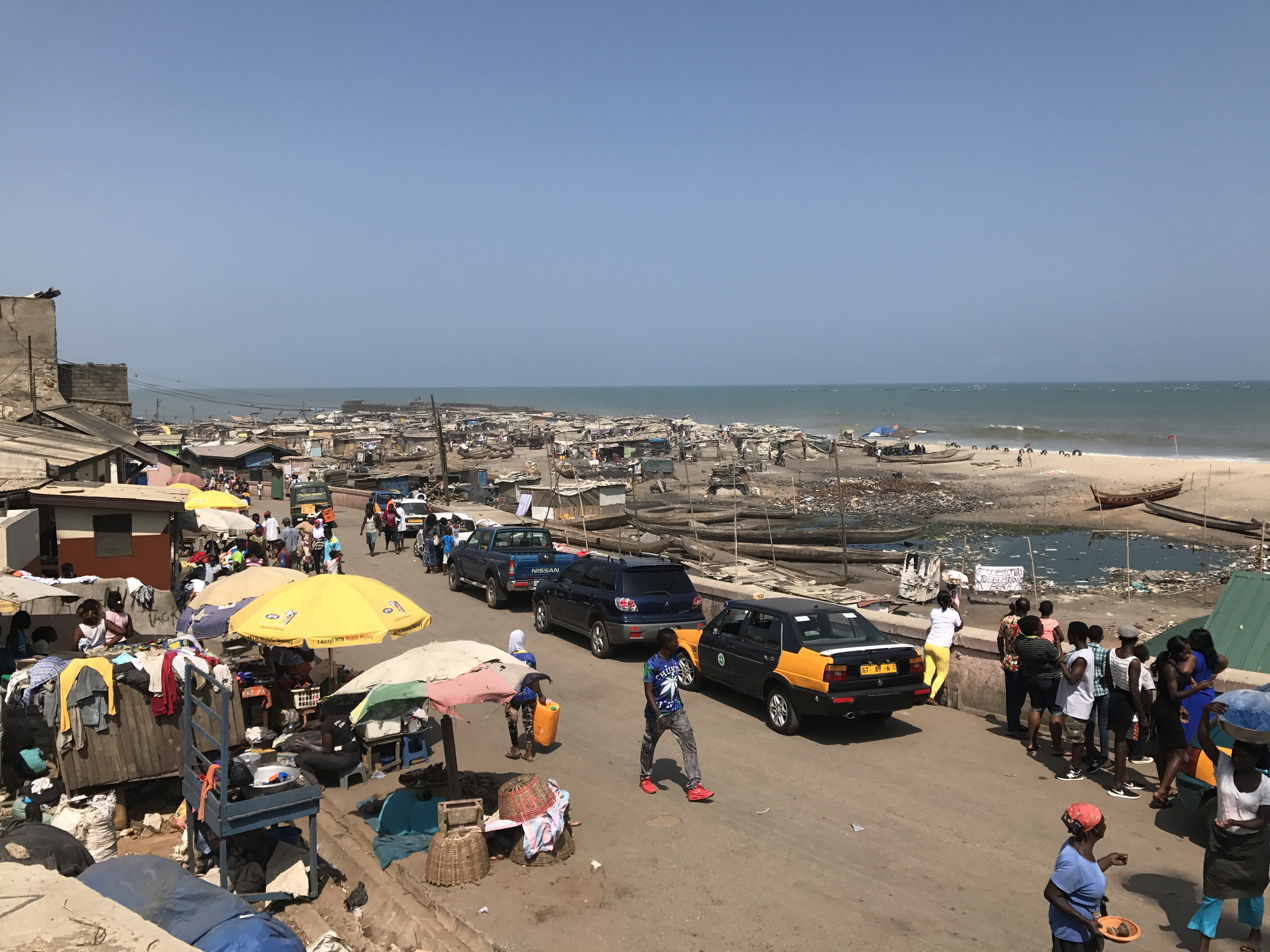
Jamestown Beach

== Chieftaincy ==
The previous chief Oblempong Nii Kojo Ababio V had been chief for thirty-nine years. His death was officially announced in February 2018.

== Landmarks/Places of Interest ==
- James Fort
- Jamestown Lighthouse
- Ussher Fort
- Accra Central Station
- Accra Central Post Office
- Rawlings Park
- Makola Market #2
- High Street
- Construction of the Jamestown Fishing Harbor, Ghana
