= Asebu =

- Village
- Location of Asebu in Central Region, South Ghana
- Coordinates: 5°12′53″N 1°12′36″W
- Country: Ghana
- Region: Central Region
- District: Abura-Asebu-Kwamankese District
- Elevation: 13 m (43 ft)
- Time zone: GMT
  - Summer (DST): GMT

Asebu (also known as Sabou) is a town and a former Fante chiefdom in the Abura/Asebu/Kwamankese District, Central Region, Ghana. In the history of the Gold Coast, Asebu is notable for being the first Fante chiefdom to sign a treaty with the Dutch Republic.

== History ==
Asebu Amanfi, also known as The Giant of Asebu. was a Warrior King and the founder of Asebu Kingdom.

The Treaty of Asebu, signed in 1612, allowed the Dutch to establish Fort Nassau at Mouri, now known as Moree. This was the beginning of the Dutch presence on the coast. In the mid-17th century, Asebu fought a series of wars against the Fante Confederacy, eventually falling into their sphere of influence by the 1680s and becoming permanently integrated into Fante by the 1720s.

== Festivals ==
Apayam is celebrated in all settlements. Its main features are remembrance of the dead and the training of the youth to defend the towns, using toy guns fashioned from bamboo branches and bullets from ‘abrober’ seeds.

Apayamkese festival is aimed at uniting all the people of the traditional area and also to take stock of their activities in the past year. Apayamkese festival is a new observance initiated by the reigning paramount chief. In 2010, the festival will run from 14 to 21 November in Asebu.

'Kae Ako' Festival is also celebrated in the northern parts of the traditional area. It is observed with Asafo drumming and musketry to remember a past hero (Ako) who gave his life to save the Asebus. It assures the people of their capability to defend themselves should they be attacked.
