= Ussher Fort =

Fort in Ghana

- Fort Crèvecoeur
- Part of Dutch Gold Coast
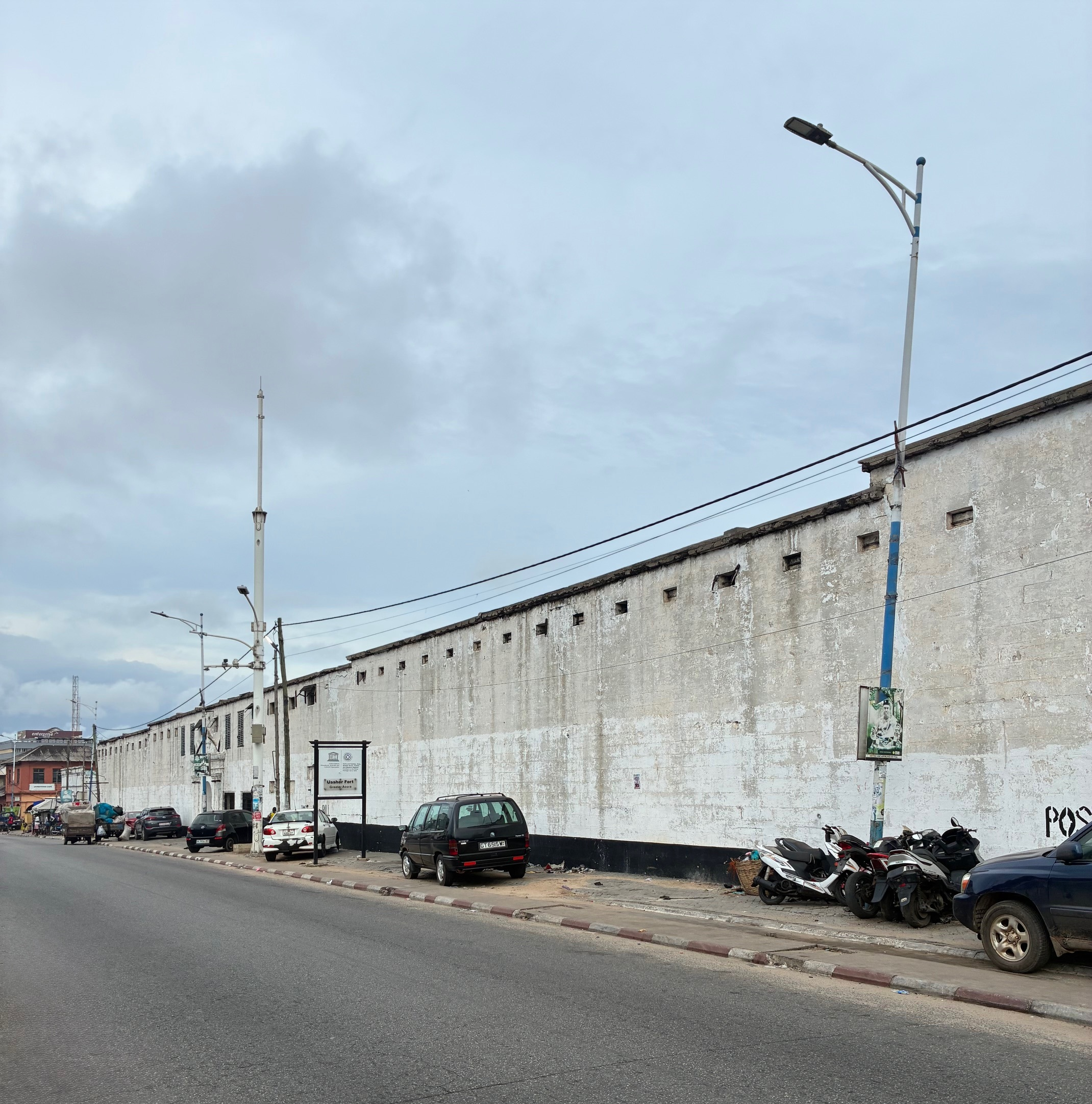
- Ussher Fort in 2026

Location
- Coordinates: 5.5385°N 0.2082°W

Site history
- Built: 1649

Garrison information
- Occupants: Netherlands (1649-1868)

UNESCO World Heritage Site
- Part of: Forts and Castles, Volta, Greater Accra, Central and Western Regions
- Criteria: Cultural: (vi)
- Reference: 34
- Inscription: 1979 (3rd Session)

Ussher Fort is a fort in Accra, Ghana. It was built by the Dutch in 1649 as Fort Crèvecœur, and is two days' march from Elmina and to the west of Accra on a rocky point between two lagoons. It was one of three forts that Europeans built in the region during the middle of the 17th century. (Note: The other two were Osu Castle (Fort Christiansborg; Danish, 1659) and Jamestown, Ghana (Fort James; British, 1673).) Fort Crèvecœur was part of the Dutch Gold Coast. The Anglo-Dutch Gold Coast Treaty (1867), which defined areas of influence on the Gold Coast, transferred it to the British in 1868. Because of its significance in the history of European colonial trade and exploitation in Africa, the fort was inscribed on the UNESCO World Heritage List in 1979 (along with several other castles and forts in Ghana).

== History ==
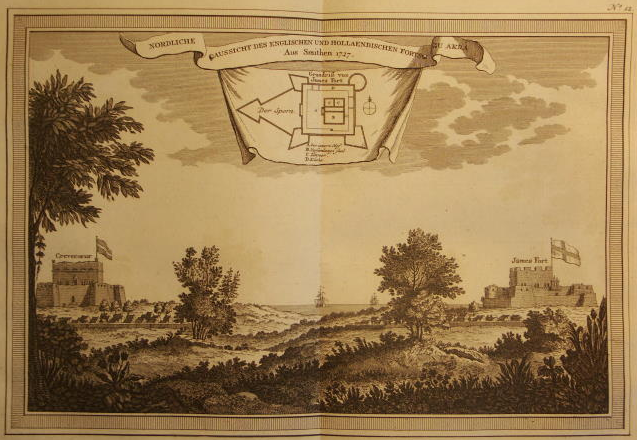
Fort Crèvecœur (left) and Fort James (right) in 1727.

Negotiations to build a Dutch fort on the site began in 1610, but did not bear fruit until much later. Fort Crèvecœur was built in 1642 as a simple factory and then enlarged in 1649 by the Dutch West India Company. It was named after Fort Crèvecœur in 's-Hertogenbosch in the Dutch Republic, which had played a crucial role in the Siege of 's-Hertogenbosch. One of the Dutch representatives, Henry Caerlof, developed good relations with the Dey of Fetu, who gave Caerlof permission to build Osu Castle in 1652 for the Swedish Africa company.

Fort Crèvecœur and Fort James were neither as imposing nor as important from the political point of view as Elmina or Cape Coast Castle, built 150 kilometers further west. Still, they brought their owners significant revenue.

At the end of 1781 Captain Thomas Shirley in the frigate HMS Leander, together with the sloop-of-war Alligator, sailed for the Dutch Gold Coast with a convoy consisting of a few merchant-vessels and transports. Britain was at war with the Dutch Republic and Shirley launched an unsuccessful attack on 17 February on the Dutch outpost at Elmina, which the Dutch repulsed four days later. Leander and Shirley then went on to capture the small Dutch forts at Mouri (Fort Nassau - 20 guns), Kormantine (Courmantyne or Fort Amsterdam - 32 guns), Apam (Fort Lijdzaamheid or Fort Patience - 22 guns), Senya Beraku (Berricoe, Berku, Fort Barracco or Fort Goede Hoop - 18 guns), and Accra (Fort Crèvecœur - 32 guns). Shirley garrisoned those facilities with personnel from Cape Coast Castle. Fort Crèvecoeur was completely destroyed, and rebuilt in 1839 by Dutch master of works Hubertus Varlet.

Fort Crèvecœur, which lies to the east of the present port, became known in time as Ussher Fort in honour of the then Administrator of the Gold Coast, Herbert Taylor Ussher.

== Currently ==
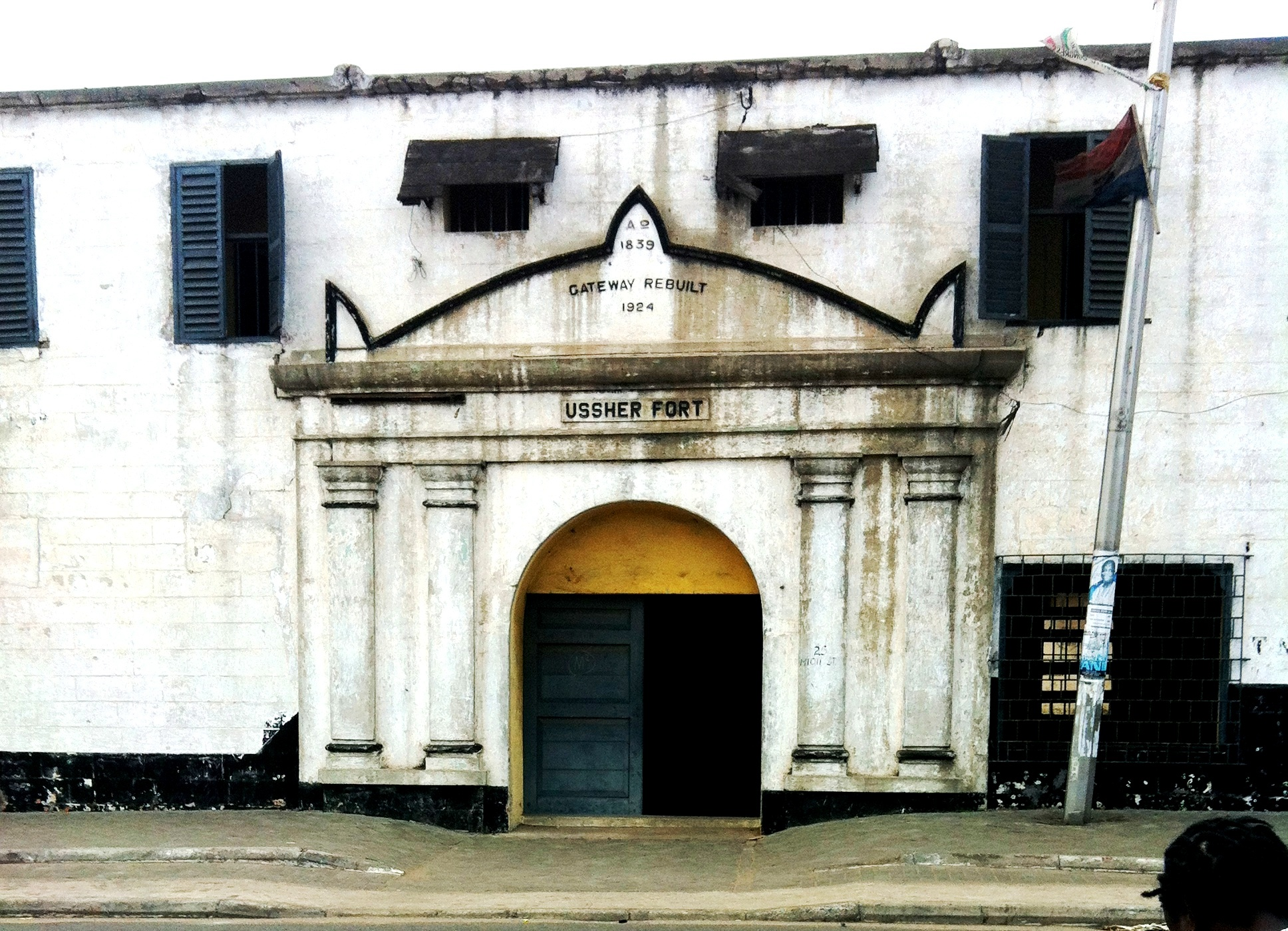
Ussher Fort today.

In all, Europeans built 27 forts on the coast of Ghana. The Dutch captured two forts from the Portuguese, and themselves built nine others. The British built ten, all before 1660. Today, only 11 of these forts are in good shape. Ussher Fort is currently being restored with funds from the European Commission and UNESCO. The purpose is to convert it to a museum and International Documentation Centre.

The fort opening hours are 9:00am to 4:30pm from Mondays to Saturdays including public holidays.

Chale Wote is hosted virtually in the premises of the fort.

== Gallery ==
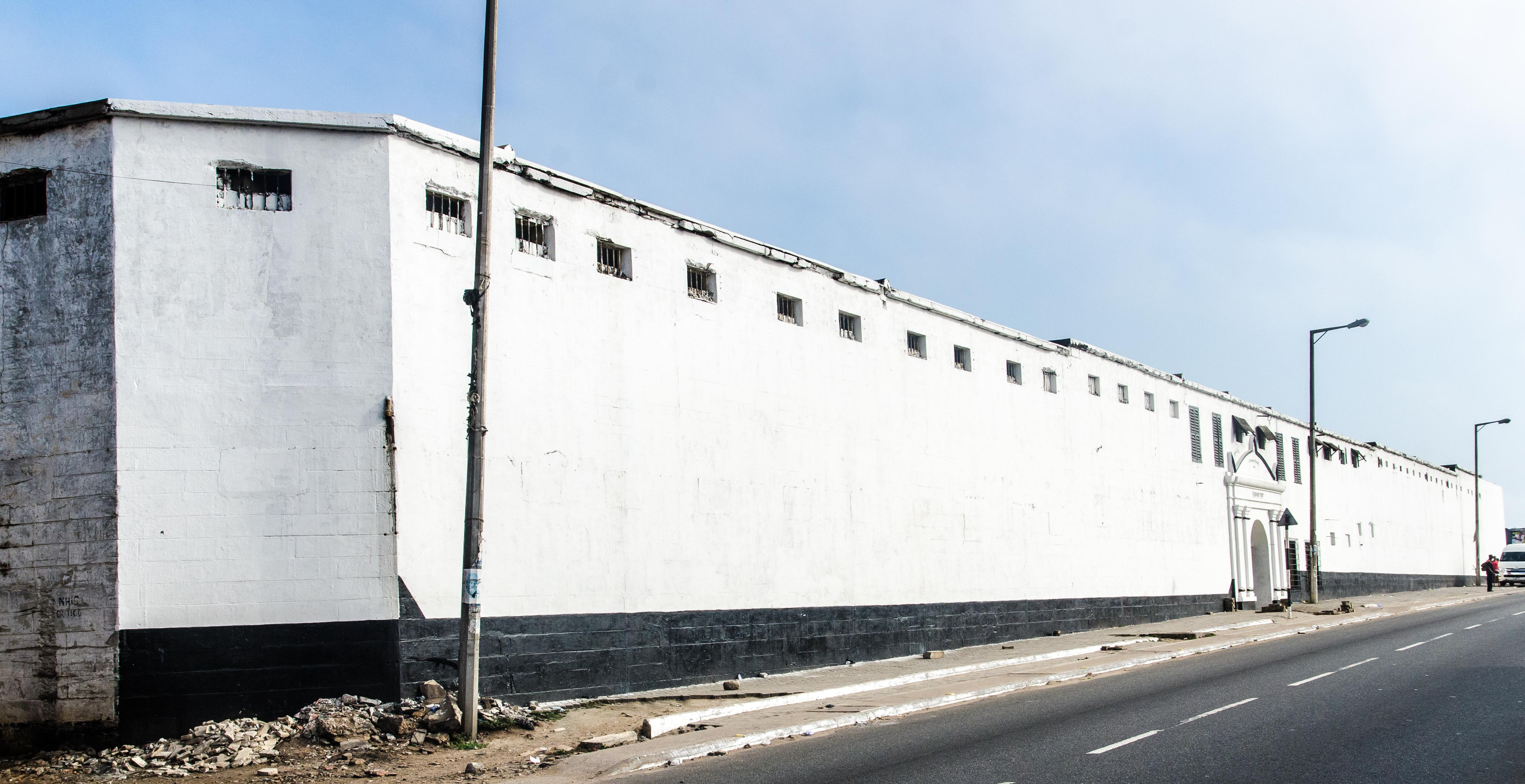
Ussher Fort built in 1649 and located in Ussher Town in the Greater Accra Region of Ghana,

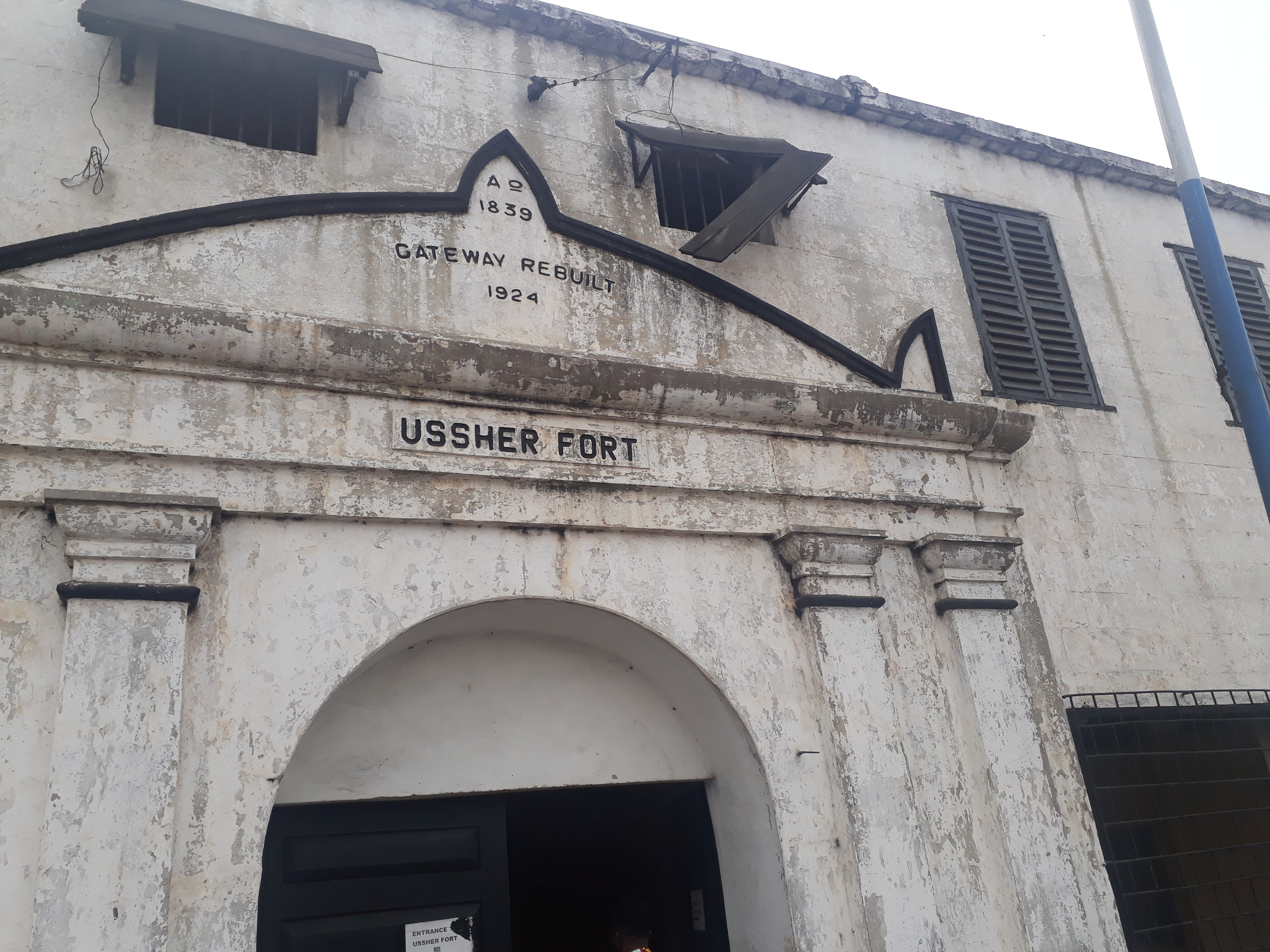
One of the entrances of Ussher Fort at Jamestown

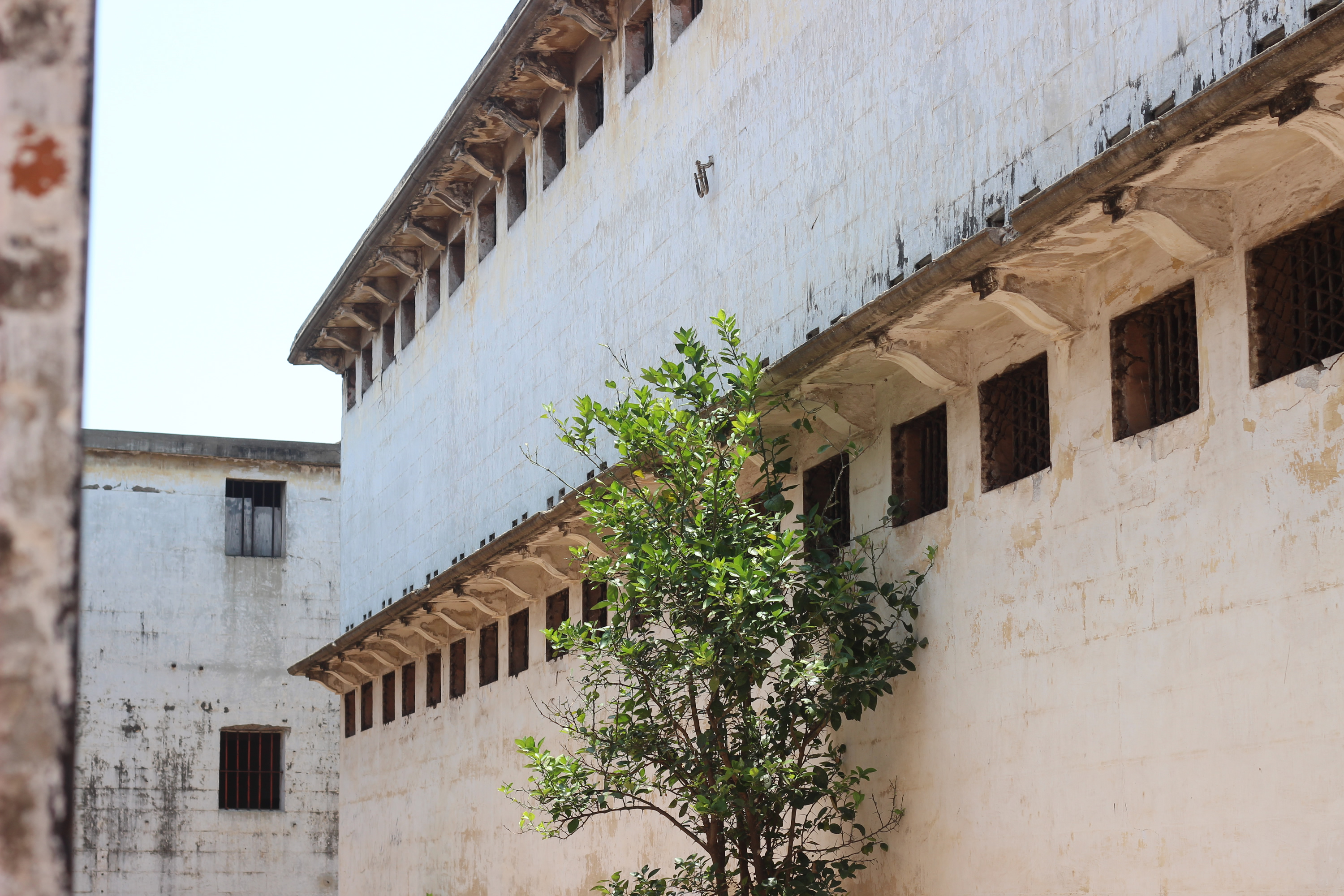
Ussher Fort at Jamestown

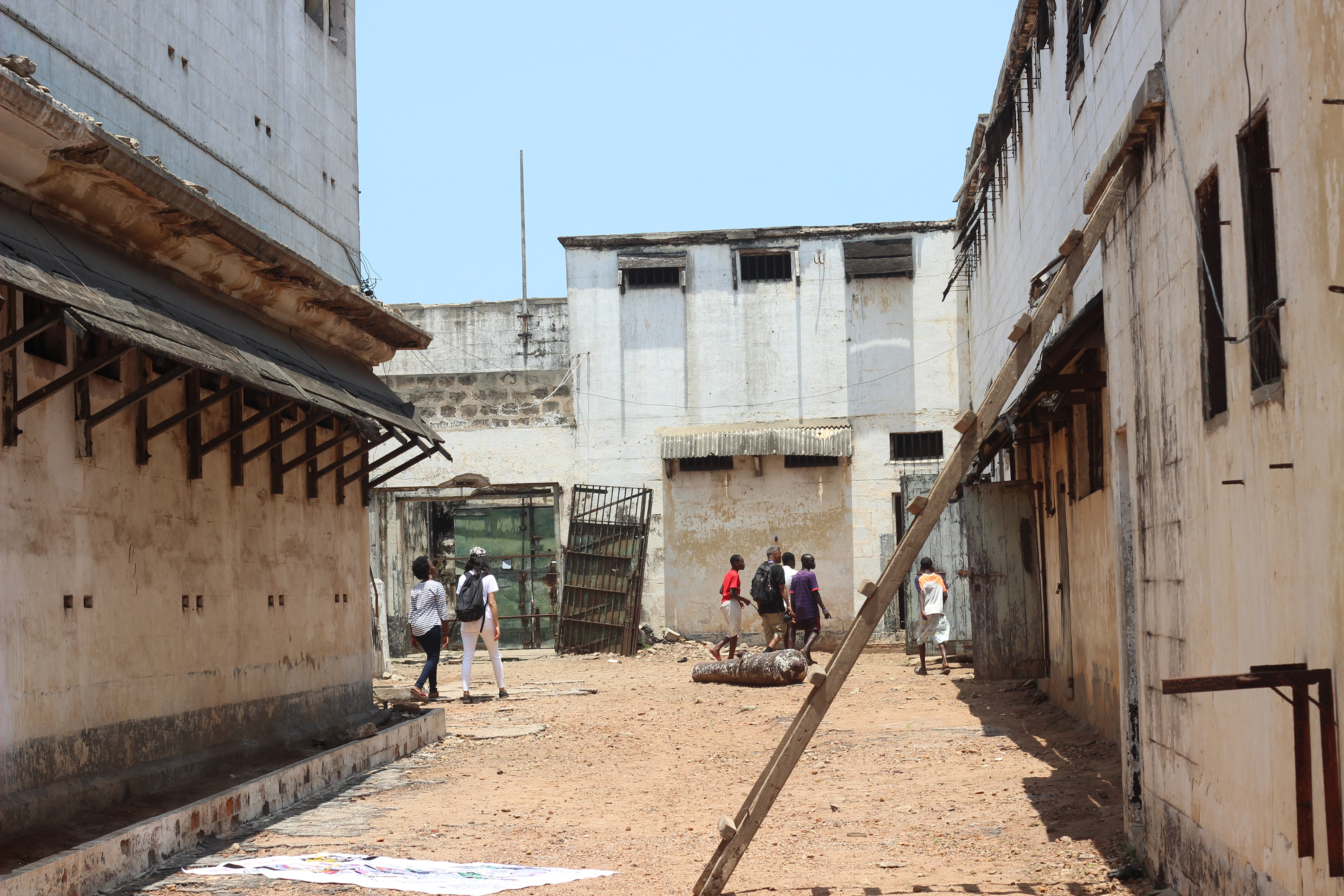
Ussher Fort at Jamestown

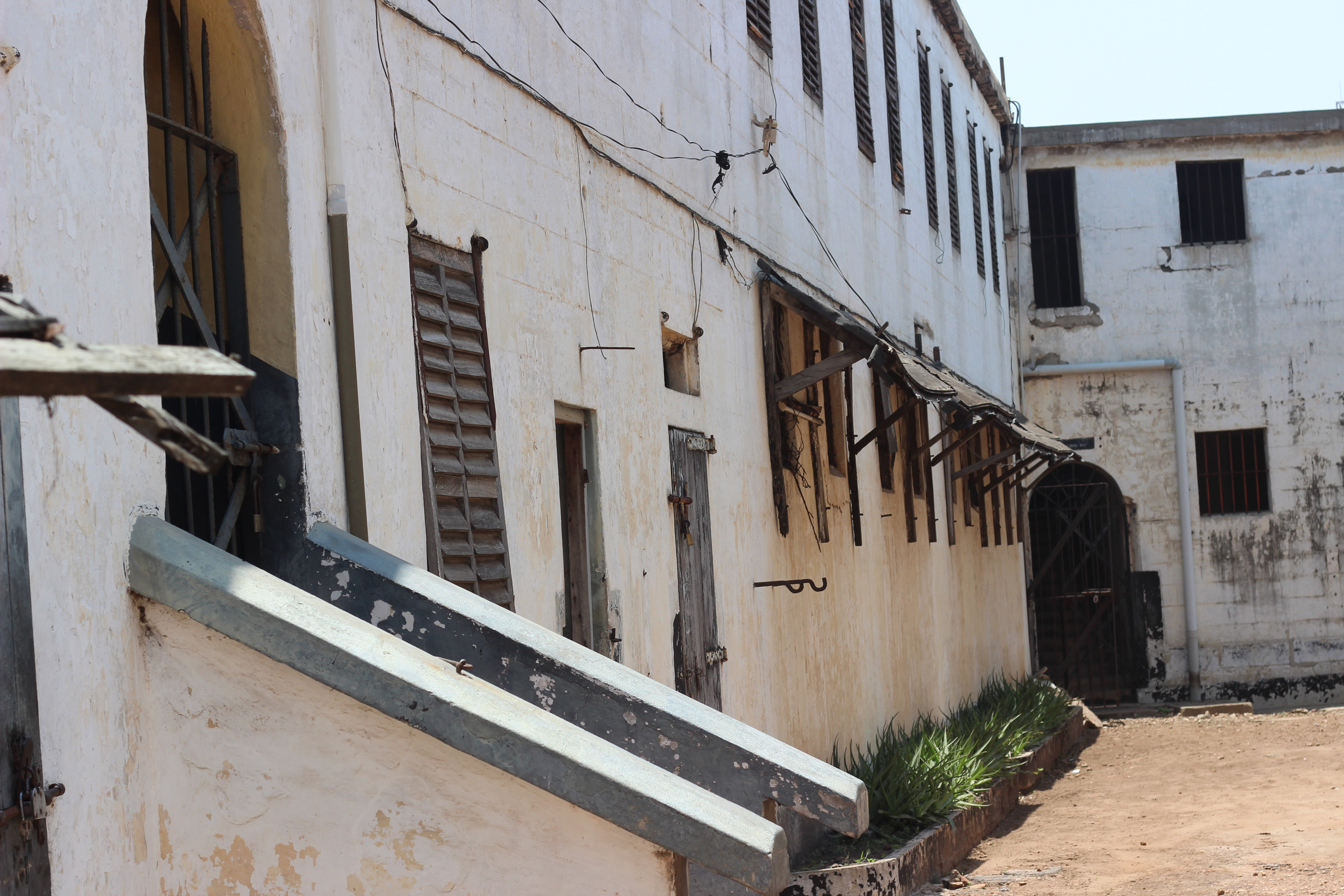
Ussher Fort at Jamestown

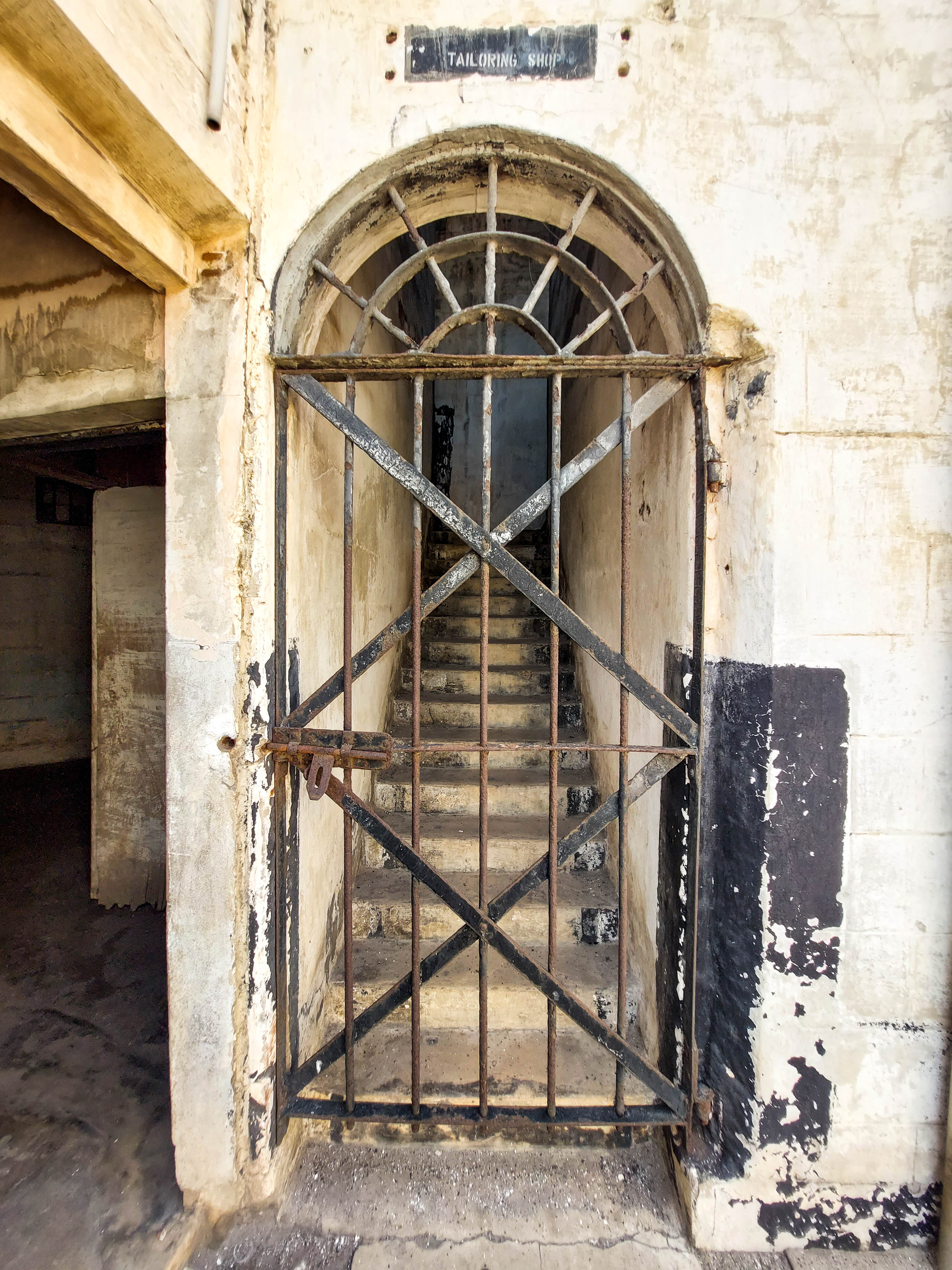
Ussher Fort in Accra, Ghana

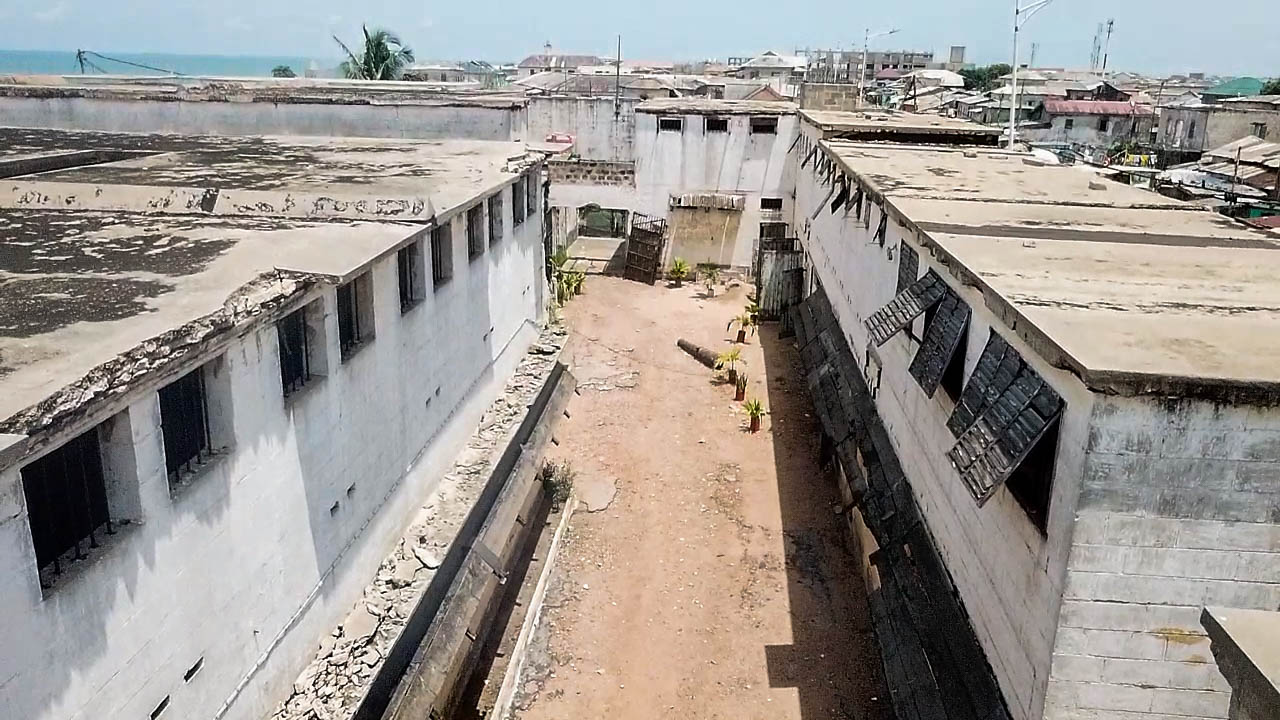
Ussher Fort in Accra, Ghana

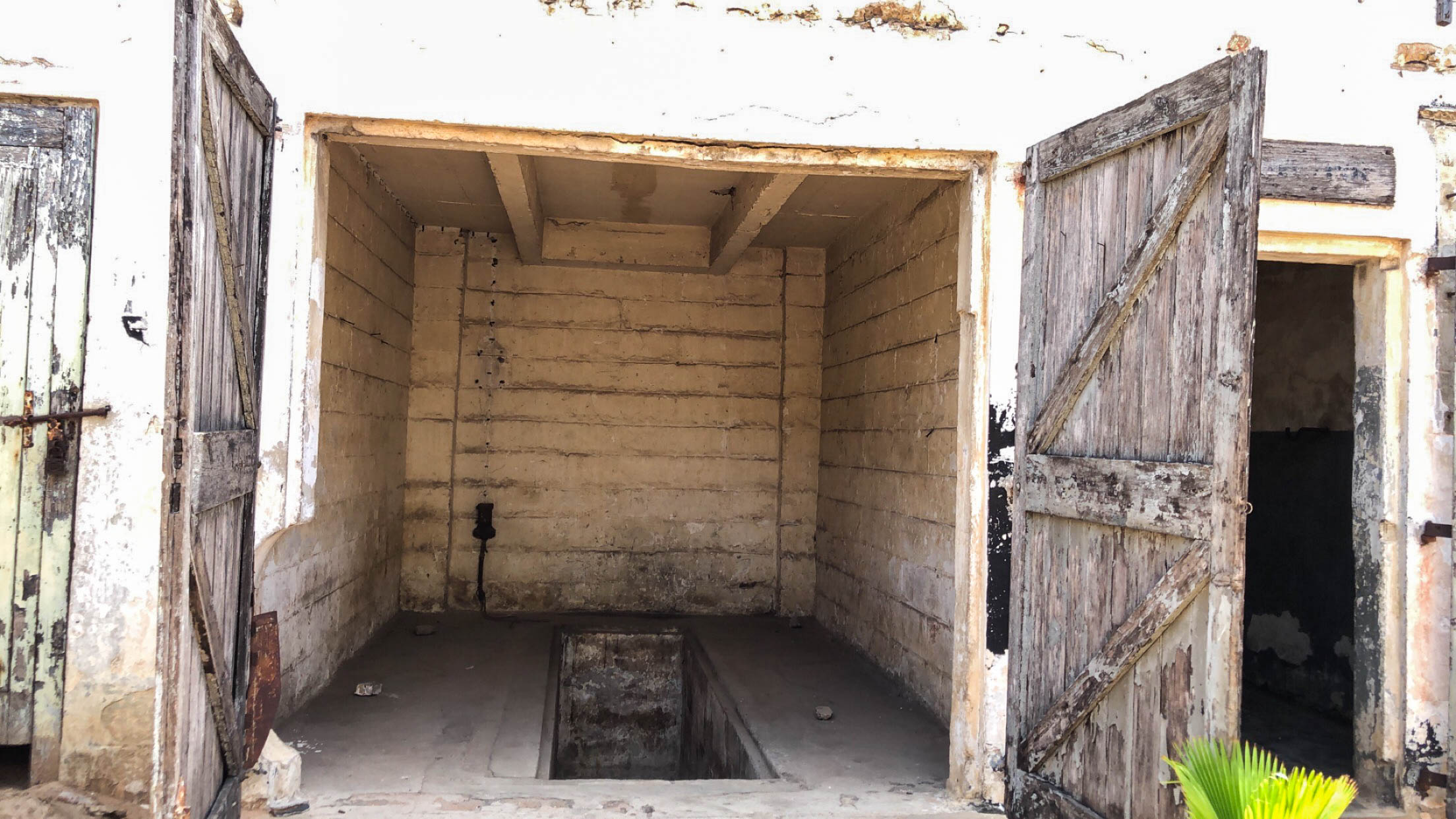
Ussher Fort in Accra, Ghana

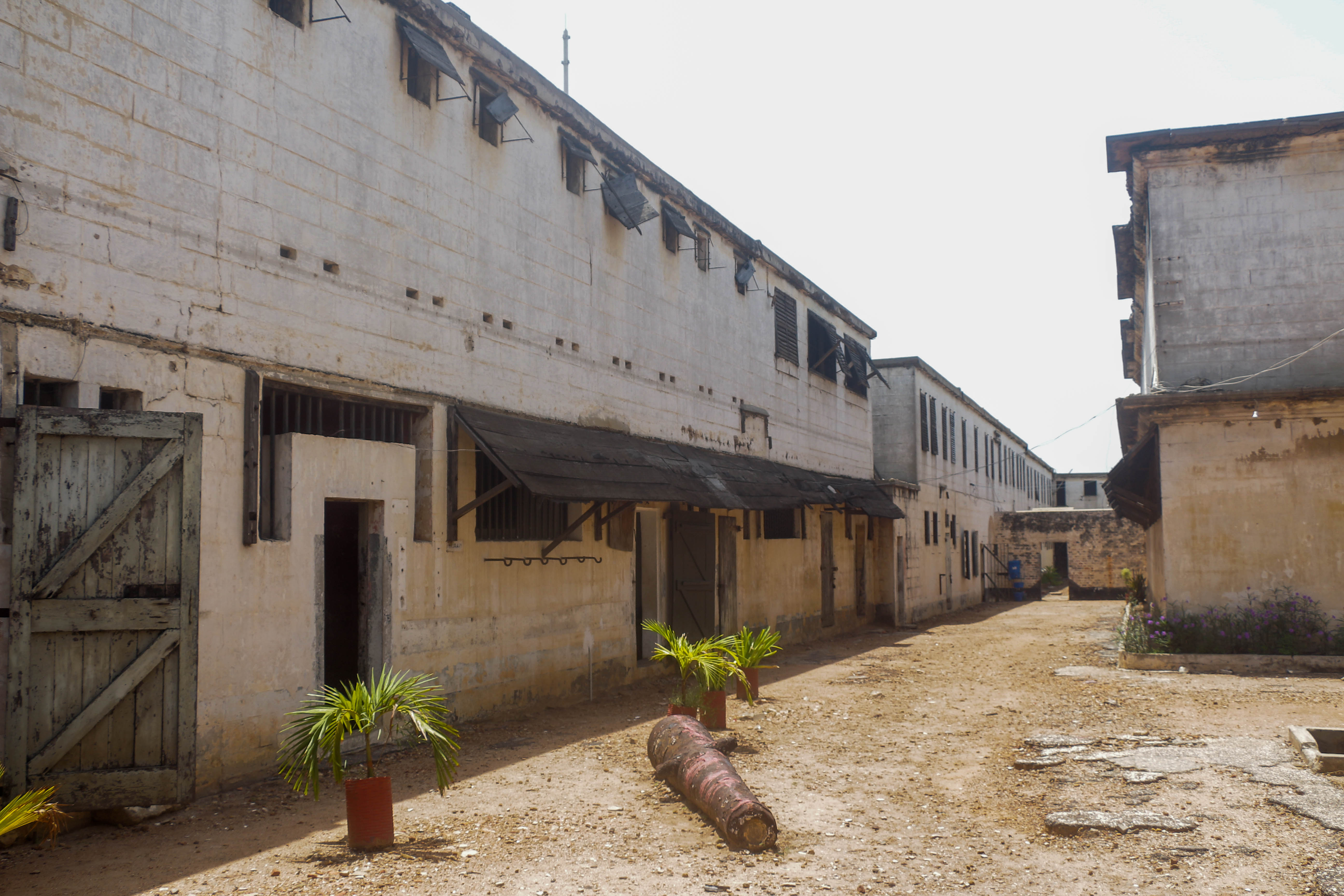
Ussher Fort

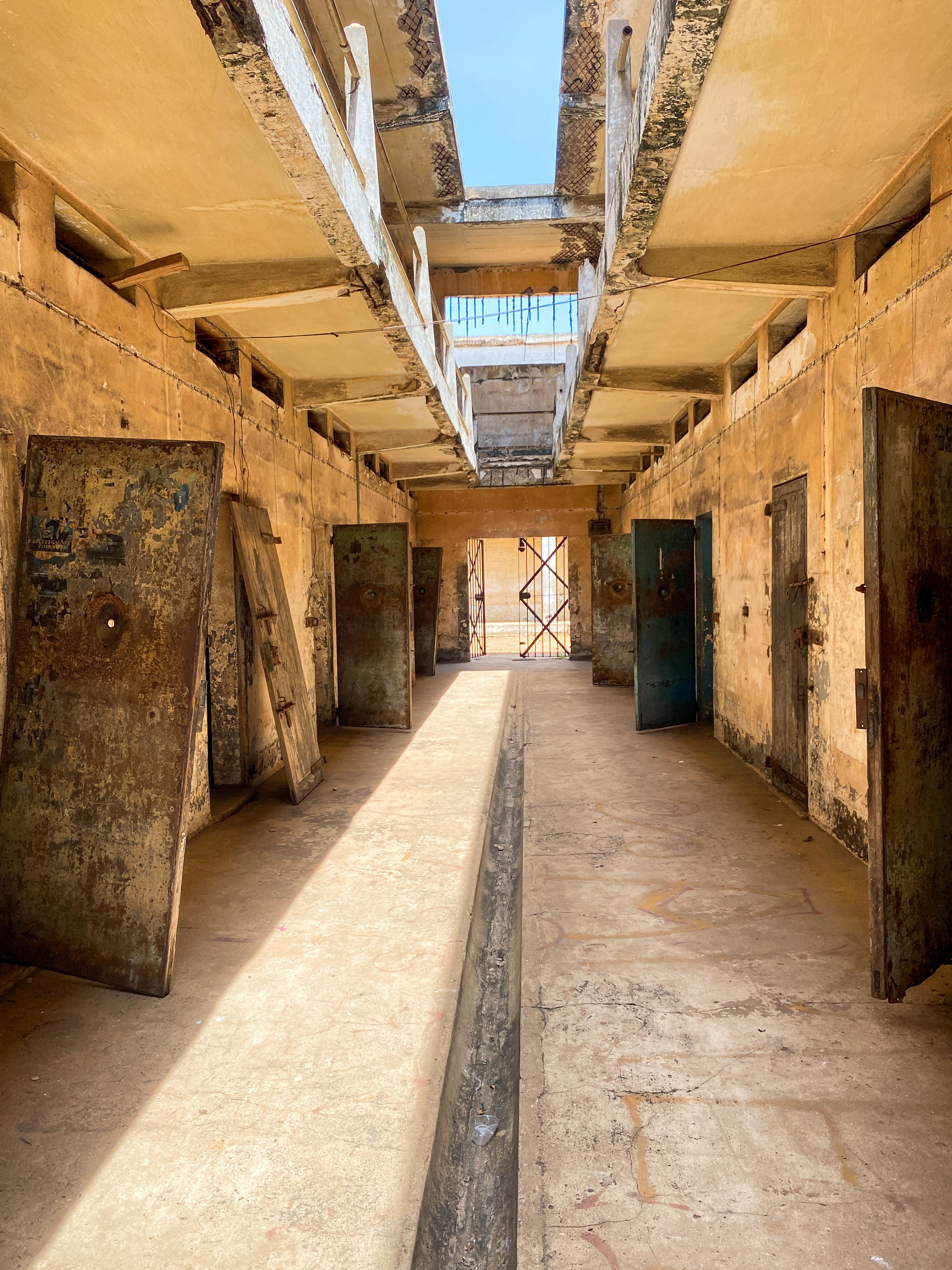
Ussher Fort

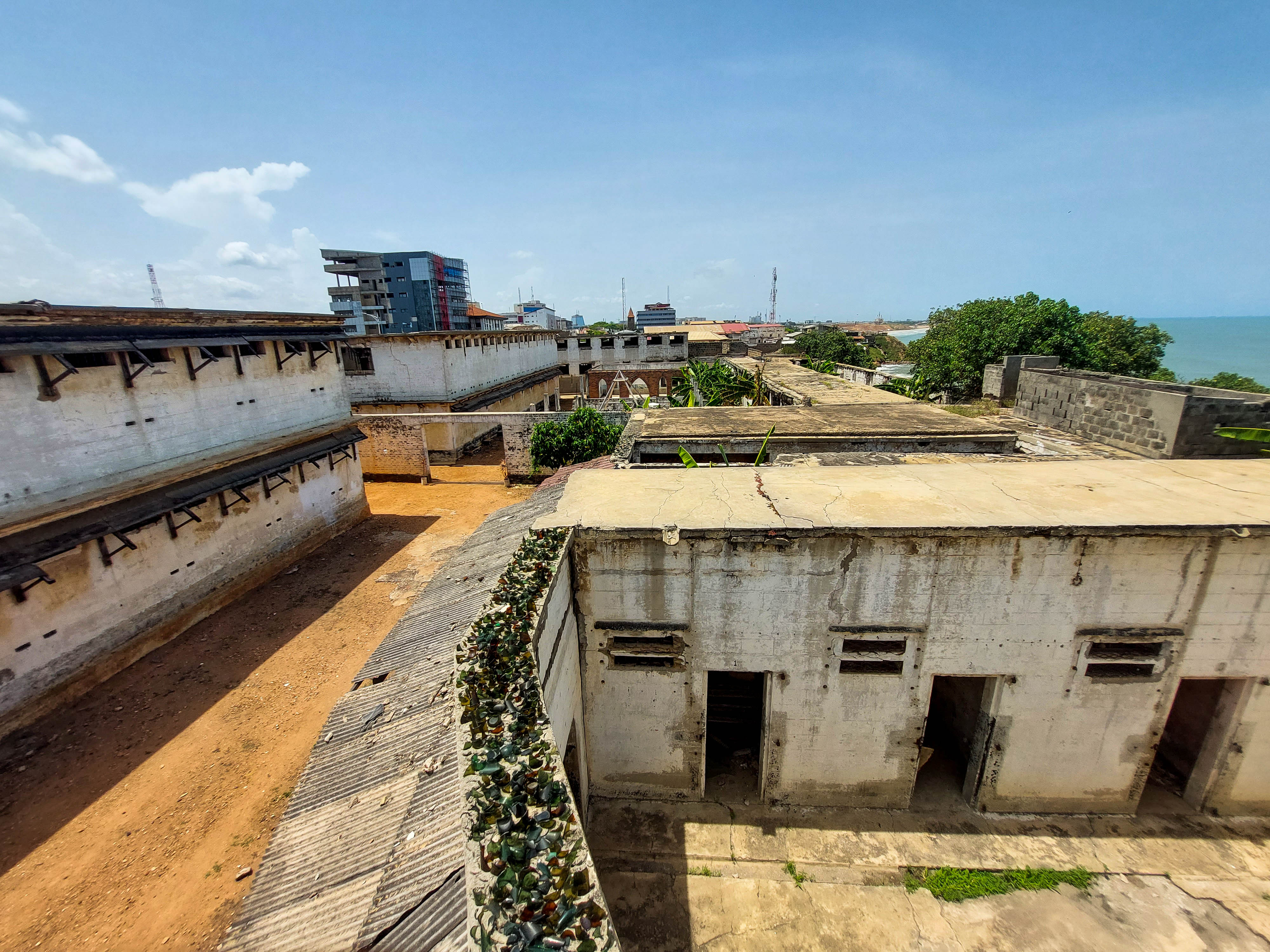
Ussher Fort

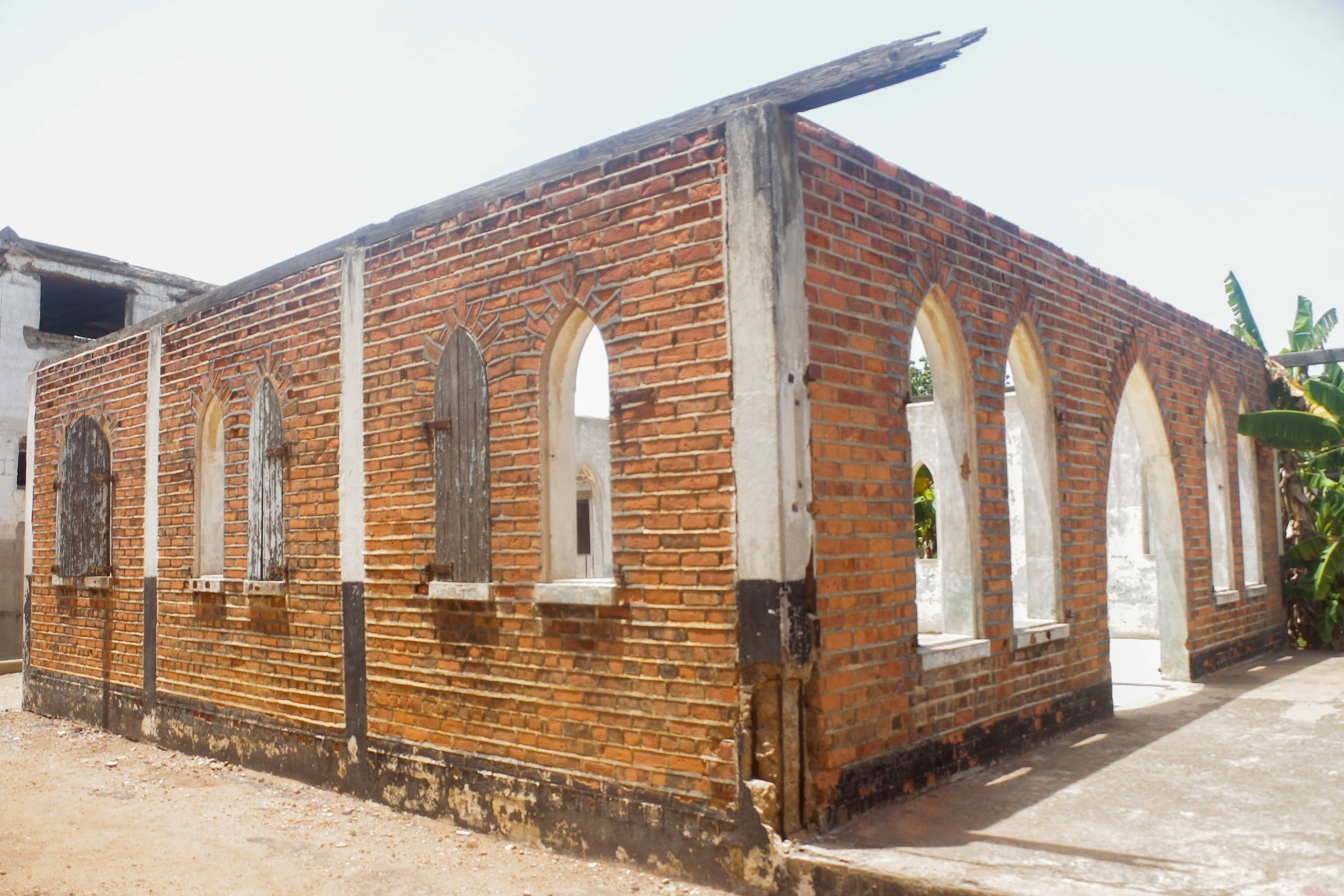
Ussher Fort

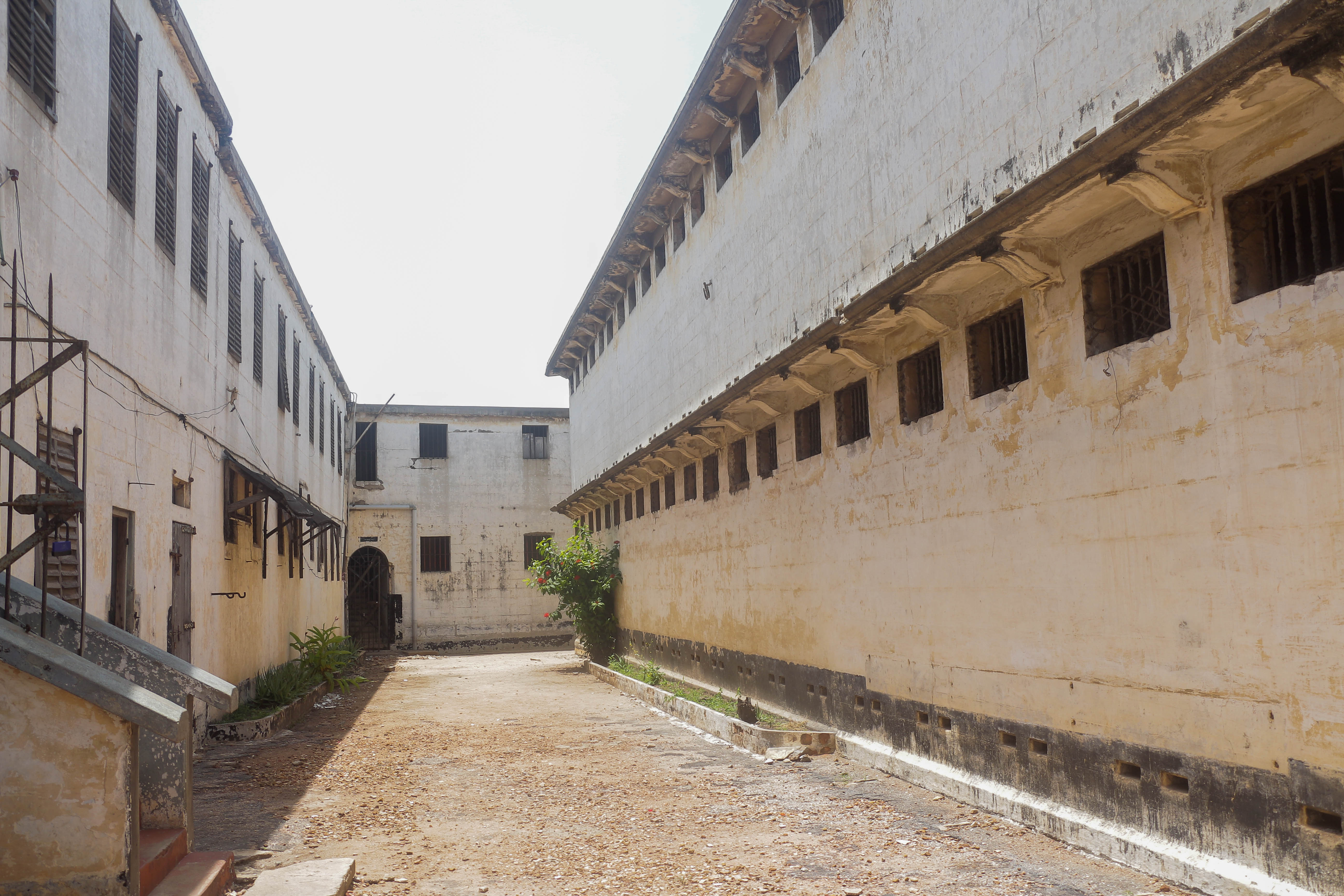
Ussher Fort at Ghana

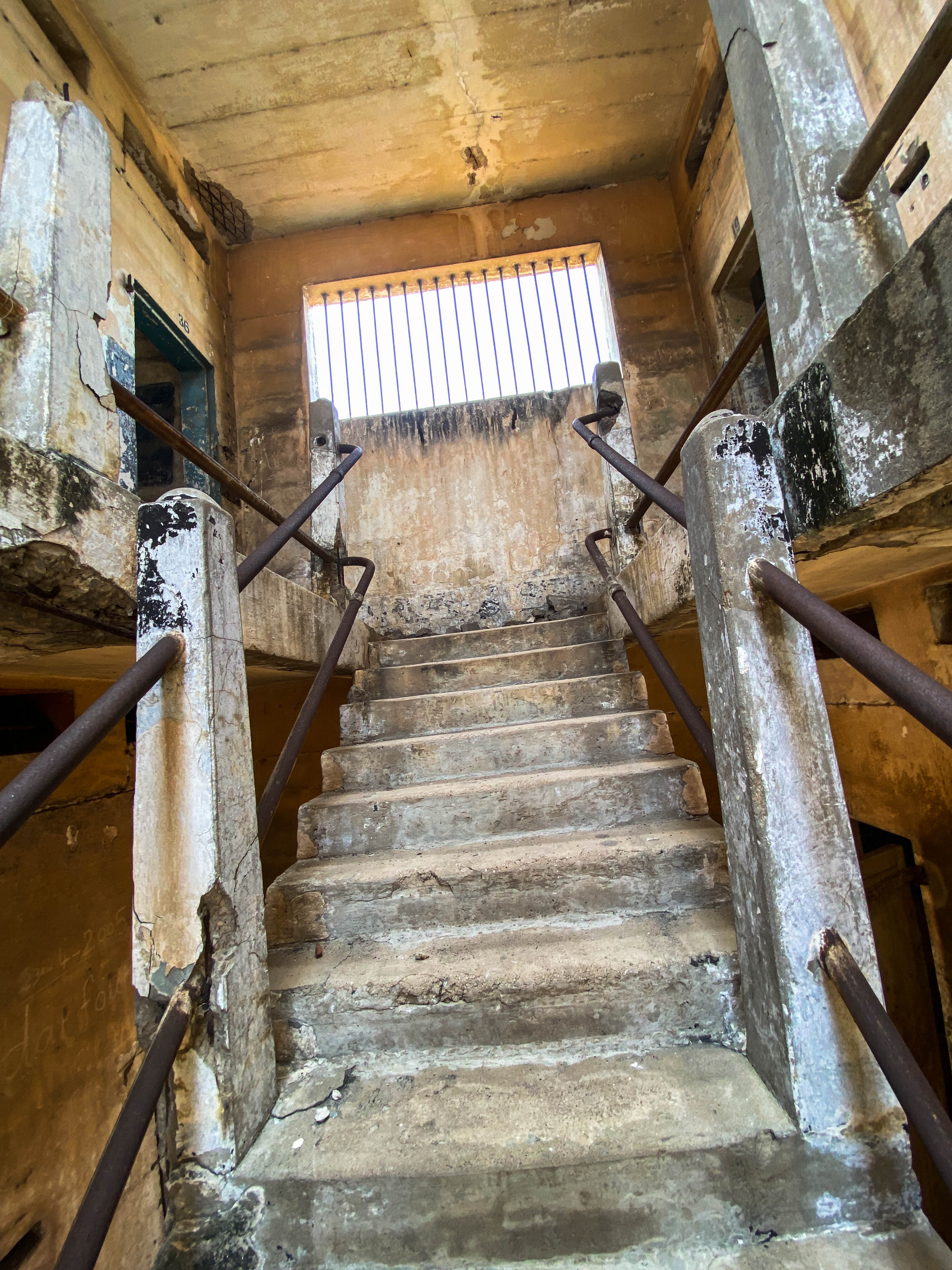
Ussher Fort at Ghana

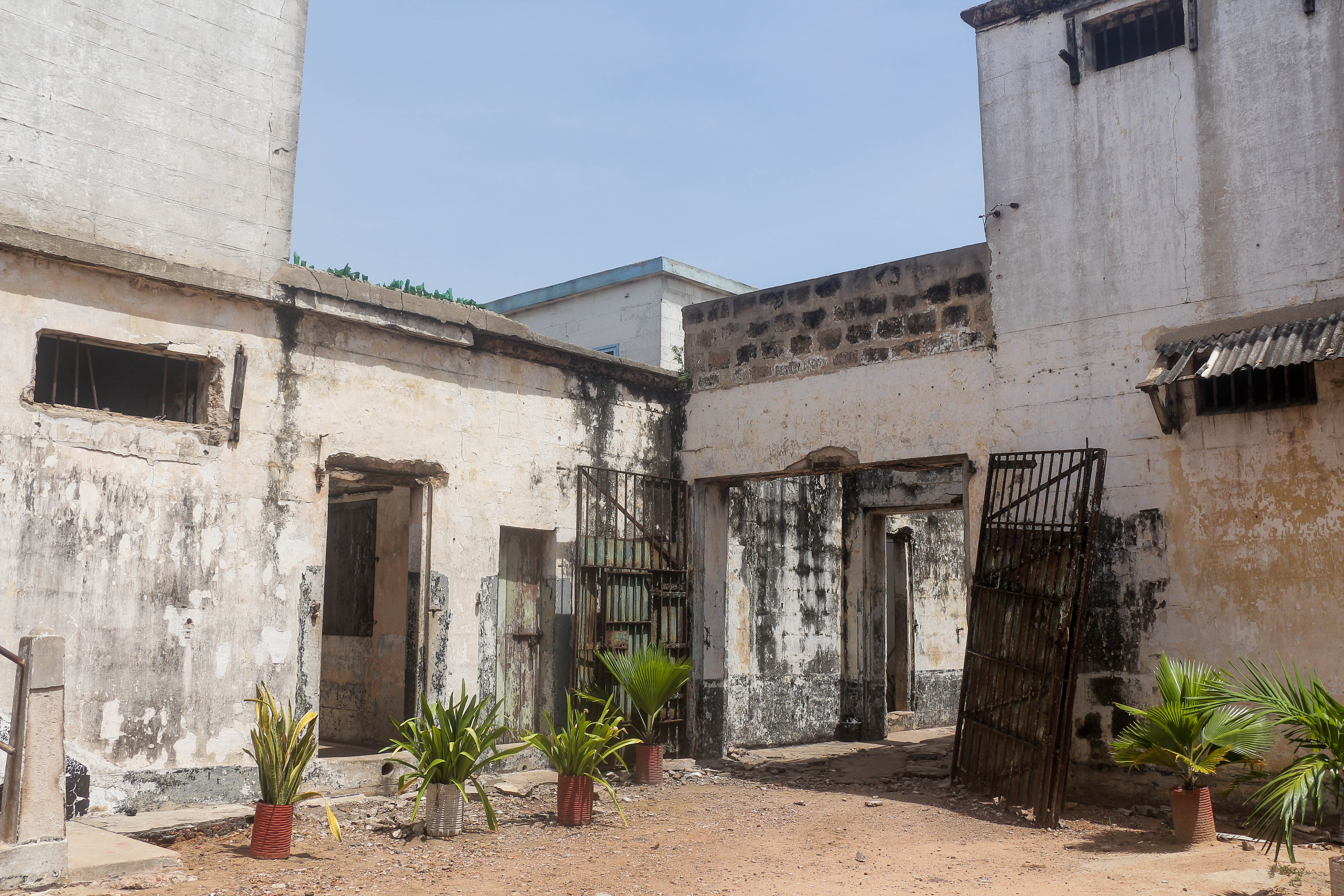
Ussher Fort at Ghana

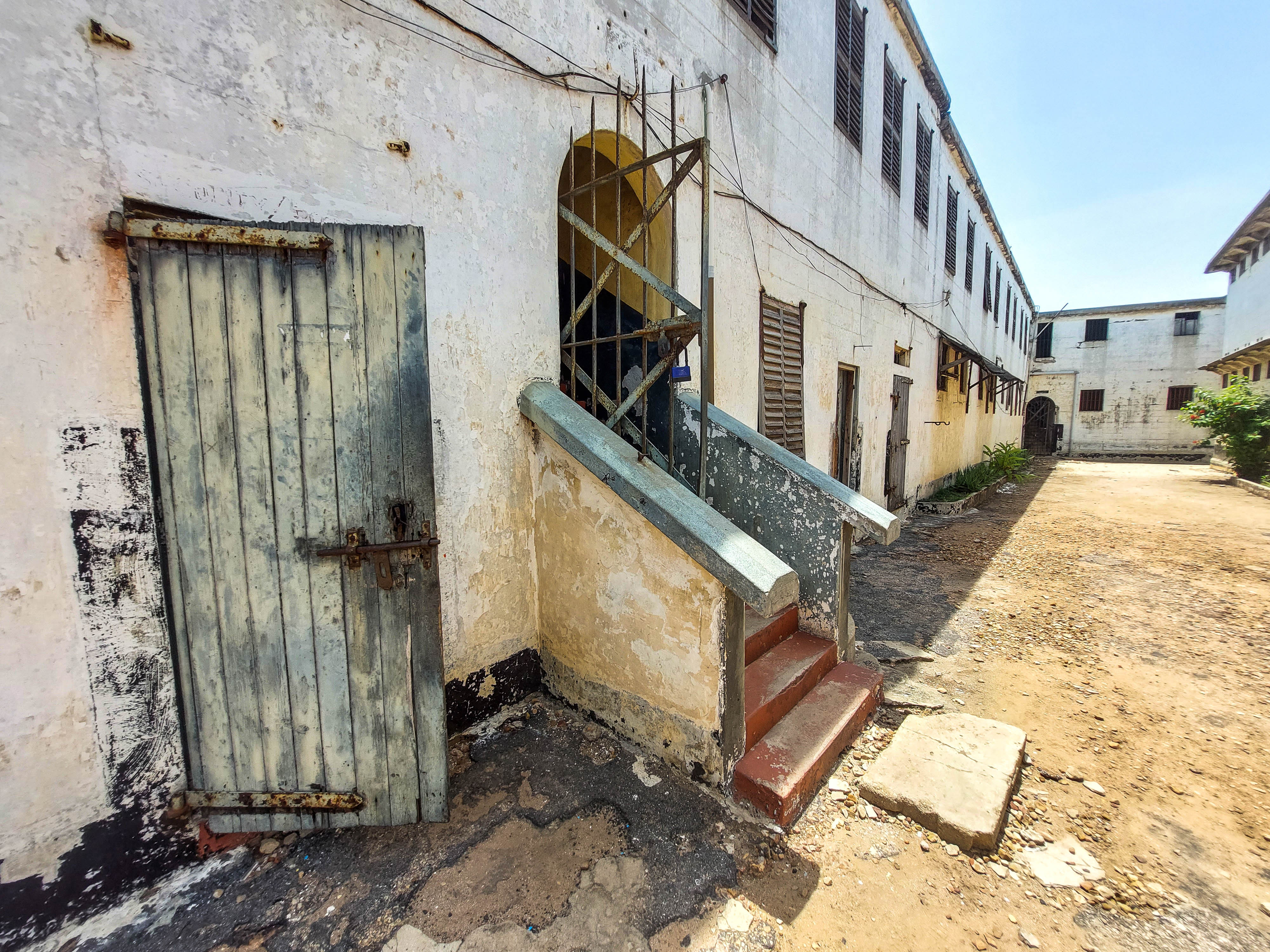
Ussher Fort at Ghana

== Notes, citations and references ==
Notes

Citations

References

- Crooks, John Joseph (1973). Records Relating to the Gold Coast Settlements from 1750 To 1874. London: Taylor & Francis. ISBN 978-0-7146-1647-6.
- Doortmont, Michel R.; Smit, Jinna (2007). Sources for the mutual history of Ghana and the Netherlands. An annotated guide to the Dutch archives relating to Ghana and West Africa in the Nationaal Archief, 1593-1960s. Leiden: Brill. ISBN 978-90-04-15850-4.
- Kropp Dakubu, Mary Esther (1997), Korle Meets the Sea: a sociolinguistic history of Accra
- Soulillou, Jacques; Salvaing, Françoise Doutreuwe (1993). Rives coloniales: architectures, de Saint-Louis à Douala. Paris: Editions de l'Orstom. ISBN 9782863640562.
- Van Dantzig, Albert (1999). Forts and Castles of Ghana. Accra: Sedco Publishing. ISBN 9964-72-010-6.
