= Abakrampa Senior High Technical School =

Location
- New Ebu Junction, Abakrampa; Abakrampa; Central Region; Abakrampa; Ghana
- Coordinates: 5°15′N 1°14′W

Information
- School type: Public Senior High Technical School Senior High Technical School
- Motto: Edwumaden wie Nkuyimzi
- Established: 1991
- Status: Active
- School district: Abura/Asebu/Kwamankese District
- Oversight: Ghana Education Service
- Head of school: Esi Sekyeraa Obeng
- Head teacher: Esi Sekyeraa Obeng
- Grades: Forms 1–3 (SHS 1–3)
- Gender: Mixed Gender
- Age: 14 to 18
- Classes offered: Agricultural Science, Business, Home Economics, Visual Arts, Technical, General Arts, and General Science
- Language: English
- Campus size: 25 acres
- Campus type: Day & Boarding
- Nickname: ABASS

Abakrampa Senior High Technical School is a public senior high technical school in Abakrampa in Ghana's Central Region. The Ghana Education Service lists it as a Category C senior high school and records it as a mixed day‑and‑boarding institution.

== History ==
The school was established in January 1991 as part of Ghana's educational reforms under the Provisional National Defence Council (PNDC). It initially operated from a disused citrus‑processing factory. A 25‑acre site at New Ebu Junction was later donated by the Nsona royal family of the Abura State for a permanent campus.

The school's motto, Edwumaden wie Nkuyimzi, encourages diligence and perseverance.

== Programmes ==
ABASS offers several academic and technical programmes, including agricultural science, business, home economics, visual arts, technical, general arts and general science. The school offers extracurricular activities in sports and other school clubs and societies.

== Facilities and development ==
The school's facilities include standard classroom blocks, an administration block, an ICT laboratory, a library, dining hall, staff housing, dormitories and sports and recreational spaces.

In August 2023, Voltic (GH) Ltd installed boreholes that supply water to the Abakrampa community, providing safe water to about 16,000 people, including pupils of ABASS.

In August 2024, the Campaign for Female Education (CAMFED) refurbished the science laboratories with equipment, including microscopes, burettes, pipettes, magnifying glasses, electrical equipment and anatomical models.

On 24 June 2024, parliamentary candidate Felix Ofosu Kwakye donated sports equipment, including poles, nets, sports balls and jerseys, training vests, and table-tennis equipment.

== Community and alumni ==
Abakrampa Senior High Technical School has produced more than 1,000 graduates working in various sectors. The alumni association organised its maiden home‑coming in February 2024 to raise funds for infrastructure and academic support; the event included health walks, panel discussions and a fund‑raising durbar.

== See also ==
- Abakrampa
- Abura/Asebu/Kwamankese District
- Education in Ghana
