= Treaty of Asebu =

1612 treaty between the Dutch Republic and the Asebu

- Type: Agreement confirming mutual jurisdictions and regulating mutual obligations
- Signed: 1612
- Location: Asebu (now Ghana)
- Effective: 1612
- Signatories: General of the Dutch Gold Coast; Chiefs of Asebu
- Parties: States General of the Netherlands; Dutch West India Company; Government of Asebu
- Language: Dutch

The Treaty of Asebu was concluded in 1612 between the Dutch Republic and the chiefs of Asebu on the Gold Coast of Africa. The treaty was the first among several concluded between the Dutch and the peoples of the Gold Coast, and marked the beginning of a 260-year period of Dutch presence on the Gold Coast.

== History ==
Although no copy of the treaty survived, it likely allowed for the establishment of Fort Nassau near Mouri. The story goes that the king of Asebu sent two envoys by the names of Carvalho and Marinho to the Dutch Republic to confirm the treaty. The fact that both men had Portuguese names suggests that they were local Christian Luso-Africans. Evidence for this early African embassy to the Dutch Republic is only circumstantial, however. No hard proof exists of these men visiting Europe.

The conclusion of this treaty should be seen in the light of the Twelve Years' Truce (1609-1621) between Portugal-Spain and the Dutch Republic. Under the terms of the treaty, the Dutch were forbidden to trade in areas occupied by either Spain or Portugal. The Portuguese claimed the entire Gold Coast as theirs; by concluding this treaty, the Dutch, who had been trading on the Gold Coast since the 1590s, laid their claim on a part of the coast as well.

== See also ==
- Treaty of Axim (1642)
- Treaty of Butre (1656)
