= Shirley's Gold Coast expedition =

British operation in the Fourth Anglo-Dutch War (1781)

- Part of the Fourth Anglo-Dutch War
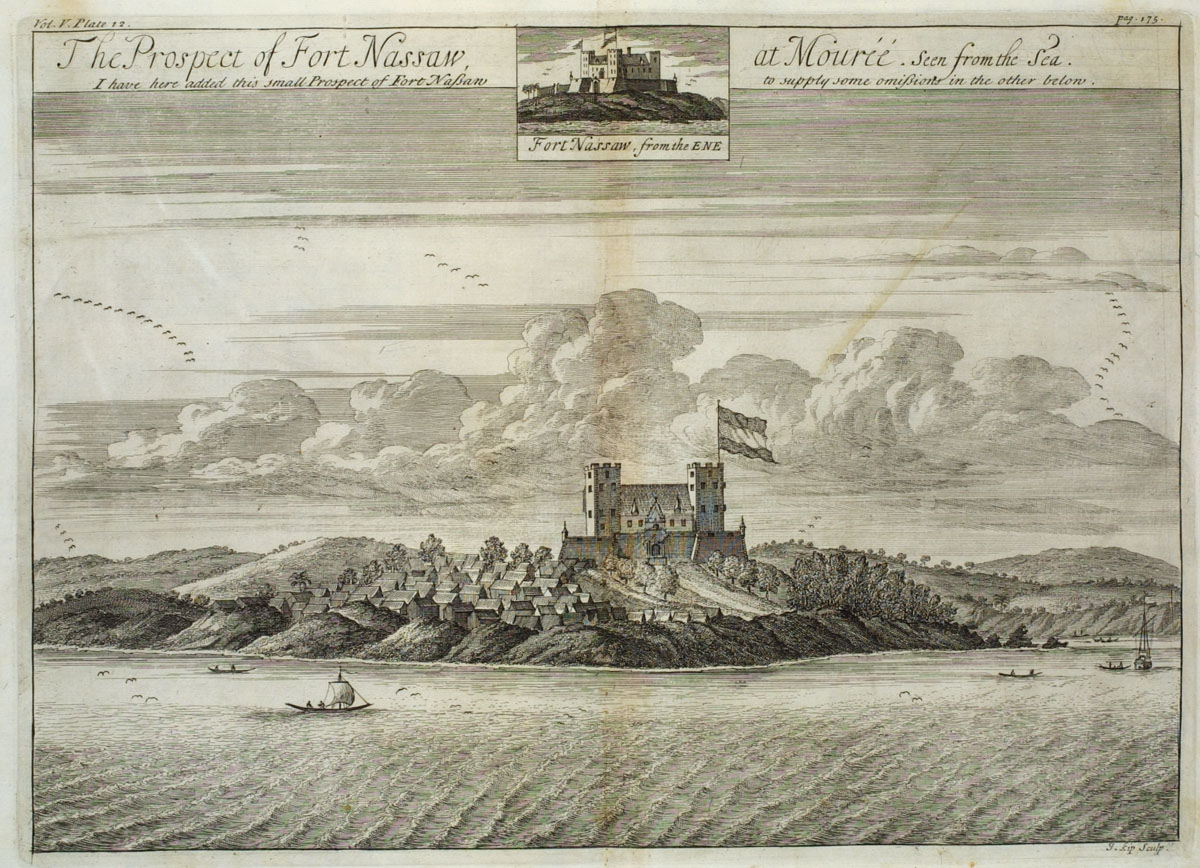
- 1704 engraved plate of Fort Nassau at Moree on the Dutch Gold Coast which was captured during the expedition
Date	January to November 1781
Location	West African coast
Result	British victory

Belligerents
Great Britain	Dutch Republic; France

Commanders and leaders
(Kingdom of Great Britain) Adam Mackenzie (Kingdom of Great Britain) Thomas Shirley	(Dutch Republic) Pieter Volkmar

Strength
4 Warships: 500–600 Soldiers	2,000

Casualties and losses
Unknown	4 forts captured 1 store ship captured

Shirley's Gold Coast expedition was British expedition sent out to capture the Dutch forts on the Dutch Gold Coast during the Fourth Anglo-Dutch War in early 1781. By the end of the year, the expedition was mostly a success - all of the Dutch forts were seized with the exception of Fort Elmina.

== Background ==
In 1780, Great Britain declared war on the Dutch Republic, opening the Fourth Anglo-Dutch War. As part of its offensive strategy, the British organized an expedition against Dutch colonial outposts on the Gold Coast of Africa (present-day Ghana). Captain Thomas Shirley led the expedition, commanding HMS Leander together with the sloop-of-war Alligator with a small convoy consisting of a few merchant-vessels, several transports carrying two small regiments of independently raised troops under the command of Captain Kenneth Mackenzie of the 78th Foot.

== Expedition ==
The expedition sailed late in 1780, and arrived off the coast of Africa in January 1781. Pursuant to orders, Shirley first stopped at the primary British outpost of Cape Coast Castle on 5 February, where plans were developed to take the principal Dutch castle at Elmina by land while Leander made a diversionary attack on the nearby St. Jago castle. The expedition arrived at Elmina on 15 February, but an attack on the fort failed.

Over the next several weeks the expedition seized, with minimal resistance, four small Dutch forts: Moree (Fort Nassau - 20 guns), Kormantin (Courmantyne or Fort Amsterdam - 32 guns), Apam (Fort Lijdzaamheid or Fort Patience - 22 guns), Senya Beraku (Fort Goede Hoop - 18 guns), and Accra (Fort Crêvecoeur - 32 guns).

Leaving those facilities garrisoned with personnel from Cape Coast, Shirley then sailed for the West Indies. In November near the African coast Senegal, he captured and destroyed the French store-ship Officeuse, supposed to be worth £30,000. before crossing the Atlantic to join the British West Indies fleet.

== Aftermath ==
Shirley sent two sets of dispatches back to Britain. One set went in the transport sloop Ulysses, which was under the command of Captain Frodsham. The French frigate Fée captured Ulysses and took her into Brest, but not before her captain had weighted the dispatches and thrown them overboard. Shirley's first lieutenant, Mr. Van court, took the second set in the transport cartel Mackerel, which also carried the Dutch governors of the forts to Europe.
