= Abura-Dunkwa =

- Town
- Location of Dunkwa-On-Offin in Central Region, South Ghana
- Coordinates: 5°20′16″N 1°10′16″W
- Country: Ghana
- Region: Central Region
- District: Abura-Asebu-Kwamankese District
- Elevation: 80 m (260 ft)
- Time zone: GMT
  - Summer (DST): GMT

Abura-Dunkwa is a small town and the capital of Abura-Asebu-Kwamankese District, a district in the Central Region of south Ghana.

== Geography ==
=== Topography ===
Abura-Dunkwa is low-lying with loose quaternary sands and it rises up to 80 metres above sea level. The town is drained by a number of rivers and streams, .

== Education ==
Abura-Dunkwa is known for the Aburaman Senior High Sch, Methodist Basic and Junior High School and Baiden Walker Basic and Junior High School

== Transport ==
Abura-Dunkwa is on the N8 road the Yamoransa Kumasi road. Abura Dunkwa has a bus station at the junction of the town. Buses and taxis operate at this bus station, connecting to other smaller towns within the district.
