= Gyabankrom =

Community in Central region, Ghana

- Country: Ghana
- Region: Central Region
- District: Abura/Asebu/Kwamankese District

Gyabankrom is a community in the Abura/Asebu/Kwamankese District in the Central Region of Ghana. Garri is produced and oil palm is processed in Gyabankrom.

== Institutions ==
- Afrangua District Assembly Basic School
- Mpeseduadze Bob Beadle JHS
- Betsingua District Assembly Basic School

== Notable native ==
- Lawyer Obo Kofi Imbeah (died 2018)
