= Abakrampa =

- Town
- Location of Abakrampa in Ghana
- Coordinates: 5°15′N 1°14′W
- Country: Ghana
- Region: GH-CP
- Founded: 1366

Government
  - Paramount Chief (Omanhene): Nana Otu XI
- Elevation: 76 m (249 ft)

Population (2021)
  - Total: 7,593

Abakrampa (also spelled Abankrampa) is a town in the Central Region of Ghana. Locally nick‑named ABK, it lies about 15 km north‑east of Cape Coast at 5°15′N 1°14′W and an elevation of roughly 76 m. Abakrampa is the traditional capital of the Abura/Asebu/Kwamankese District and serves as the seat of the Omanhene (paramount chief) of the Abura State.

== History ==
The settlement was originally known as Abramboe. Oral tradition says it was founded in 1366 and became the principal seat of the Abura paramountcy during the reign of Kwesi Idun Panyin in 1666. According to legend, a hunter named Okormansa Amoa met an Etsi farmer, Edu‑Afor, near Akrampa Panyin (site of today's senior high school). Edu‑Afor showed him a palm tree being devoured by vultures and a nearby alligator hole, signs of water, prompting a settlement there.

Another explanation derives the name Abakrampa from the Fante words abɛ (palm nut) and krampa (vulture), meaning "the place where vultures eat palm nuts," or from two Fante palm‑wine tappers, Abakah and Ampah; the place was called Abakah‑Ampah, later corrupted to Abakrampa. The town's appellation Ngyedum ("fire quenchers") reflects its spiritual potency.

=== Conflict and the Abakrampa War ===
During the Second Anglo-Ashanti War (also called the Sagrenti War) of 1873–1874, Asantehene Kofi Karikari demanded more tribute from the Fante. When Fante merchant Kate Efua Ketse Dawson refused, he ordered an attack on Cape Coast.

British and Fante forces confronted the Asante army at Abakrampa, and the Asante suffered heavy losses, accounts mention over 20,000 casualties, forcing them to retreat. A second offensive was also repulsed after the Fante mobilised support from the British. The engagement, known locally as the Abakrampa War, proved decisive in the British campaign against Asante.

== Geography and demographics ==
Abakrampa sits in the forest belt of the Central Region and stands about 76 m above sea level. Census projections show its population rising from approximately 4,771 in 2000 to 7,593 in 2021. The 2010 Population and Housing Census ranked Abakrampa as the third largest urban settlement in the Abura/Asebu/Kwamankese District after Moree and Abura‑Dunkwa.

== Administration ==
As the seat of the Abura Traditional Council, Abakrampa hosts the palace of the Omanhene. The current paramount chief, Nana Otu XI, was installed at Abakrampa in 2024.

== Education ==
Abakrampa Senior High Technical School (ABASS) is a co‑educational public senior high/technical institution founded in January 1991. Initially located in an abandoned citrus factory, it moved to a 25‑acre site at New Ebu Junction donated by the Nsona royal family.

Programmes offered include agricultural science, business, home economics, visual arts, technical, general arts and general science. In 2024, it held its first alumni homecoming with more than 1,000 graduates participating.

== Notable people ==
- Nana Otu XI – current Omanhene (paramount chief) of Abura State.
- Kate Efua Ketse Dawson – Fante businesswoman credited with financing military resistance against the Asante in 1873.

== See also ==
- Abura/Asebu/Kwamankese District
- Second Anglo-Ashanti War
