= Asebu Amanfi =

Founder of the Asebu Kingdom

Amanfi also known as The Giant of Asebu was a Warrior King and the founder of Asebu Kingdom in the Central Region of Ghana.

== History ==
According to oral tradition, Asebu was a giant with an unusual physical appearance and possessed spiritual powers. It is believed that he founded the Asebu Kingdom with his brother Farnyi Kwegya after they fled Egypt. Legend has it that, Asebu the giant led an army that chased the children of Israel during the Exodus. They crossed Lake Chad and went further down to Benin City and finally settled in Moore. After his men drowned, he could not return to Pharaoh around the coastal region of Southern Ghana. He derived his name from the Memphis along the southern part of River Nile, They lived by the side of the river in the Chad territory called Sabou. It is believed that he derived his name Asebu from the river Sabou. After he arrived in Southern Ghana, he established the kingdom together with his brother and a prolific hunter, Nana Adzekase. Asebu became the first King of Asebu Kingdom and the prolific hunter became the first Chief of Moore. They took some of the river and worshiped it as their god. When they arrived they deposited the water in the middle of their object of worship, which has become the object of worship till date. He had a sister who was called Amanfiwaa.

Asebu Amenfi's brother, Farnyi Kwegya, took advantage of the incredible abundance of fish in the waters in the region and became the first chief fisherman.

== Cultural Legacies ==
He was the first King of the Asebus; Amenfi I.

Asebu Amenfi was actually the person who fought, and expanded the Asebu chiefdom and Abakrampa all in the central region of Ghana.

An annual festival, Apayemkese (passover) is done in his memory.

His staff which he used for his various conquests also exists today and serves as a heritage object which accounts for his might

His finger prints left on rocks in Asebu is testament and still exist today and serve as a sacred heritage site.

His staff which he used for his various conquests also exists today and serves as a heritage object which accounts for his might.
