= Fort Nassau, Ghana =

UNESCO World Heritage Site in Ghana

Fort Nassau
- Part of Dutch Gold Coast
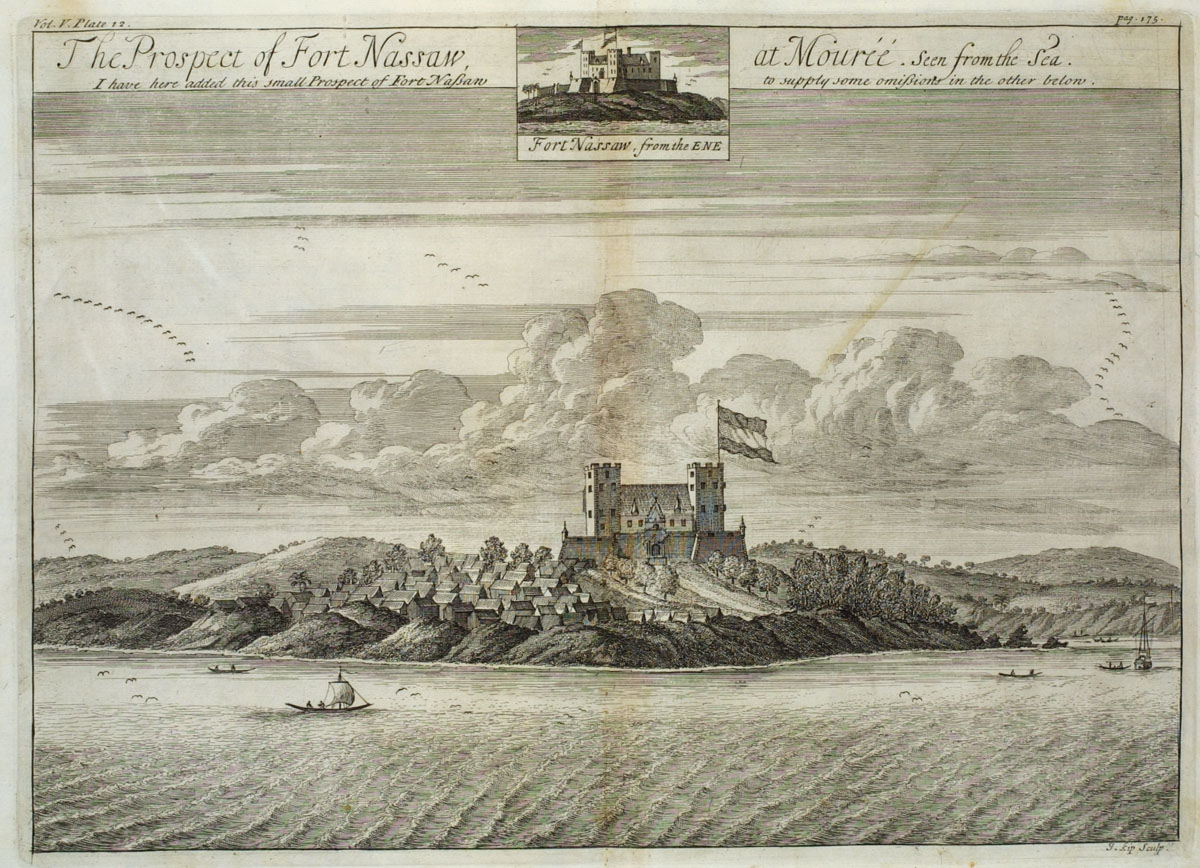
- Fort Nassau

Location
- Coordinates: 5.133333°N 1.2°W

Site history
- Built: 1612

Garrison information
- Occupants: Netherlands (1612-1868)

UNESCO World Heritage Site
- Part of: Forts and Castles, Volta, Greater Accra, Central and Western Regions
- Criteria: Cultural: (vi)
- Reference: 34
- Inscription: 1979 (3rd Session)

Fort Nassau, near Moree, Ghana, was the first fort that the Dutch established on what would become the Dutch Gold Coast. Because of its importance during the early European colonial period in West Africa and its testimony to the African gold trade and the Atlantic slave trade, the fort was inscribed on the UNESCO World Heritage list in 1979 (along with several other castles and forts in Ghana).

== Background ==
From 1598 onward, Dutch merchants traded on the Gold Coast of Africa. Although the Gold Coast was already settled by Portuguese, there was little effort to evict the Dutch, as the military resources were committed to the war in Europe.

This changed after the signing of the Twelve Years' Truce between Portugal-Spain and the Dutch Republic in 1609. The Portuguese now had sufficient resources to protect their trade monopoly, and began attacking the (from the Portuguese viewpoint, illegitimate) Dutch factories on the coast. The factory at Mouri was burned to the ground in 1610. Dutch traders then petitioned the States-General of the Dutch Republic to build a fort on the coast. The States-General was receptive of their demands, and sent Jacob Clantius, who was to become the first General on the Coast, to the Gold Coast in 1611. In 1612, the Treaty of Asebu was signed between the Dutch and the chief of Asebu, which allowed for the establishment of Fort Nassau at Mouri.

== History ==
In 1612, Clantius built a reinforced fort at Mouri, which, due to the unfamiliarity of the Dutch with building in the tropics, was notorious for its unhealthy conditions. In 1624, the Dutch considerably expanded the fort, after the ownership was transferred from the Admiralty of Amsterdam to the Dutch West India Company. Fort Nassau served as the capital of the Dutch Gold Coast from its establishment until 1637, when the Dutch captured Fort Elmina from the Portuguese.

At the end of 1781 Captain Thomas Shirley in the frigate HMS Leander, together with the sloop-of-war Alligator, sailed for the Dutch Gold Coast with a convoy consisting of a few merchant-vessels and transports. Britain was at war with the Dutch Republic and Shirley launched an unsuccessful attack on 17 February on the Dutch outpost at Elmina, being repulsed four days later. Leander and Shirley then went on to capture four small Dutch forts: Fort Nassau (20 guns), Fort Amsterdam (32 guns) at Kormantine (Courmantyne or Apam, Fort Lijdzaamheid or Fort Patience (22 guns)), Fort Goede Hoop (18 guns) at Senya Beraku (Berricoe, Berku, Fort Barracco), and Fort Crèvecœur (32 guns), at Accra. Shirley then garrisoned those facilities with personnel from Cape Coast Castle.

== Gallery ==
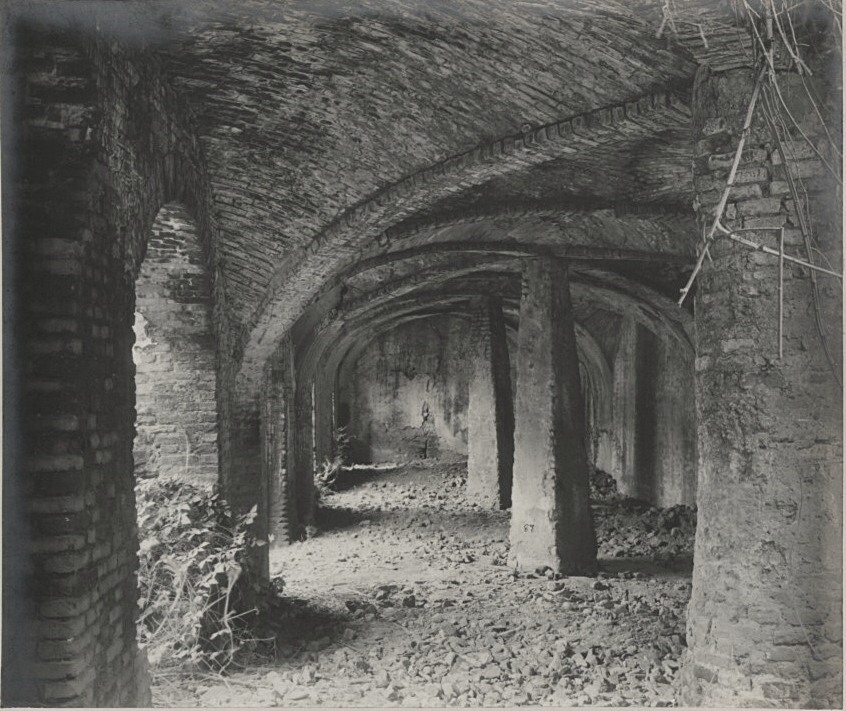
Guard Room, Fort Nassau, 1890s

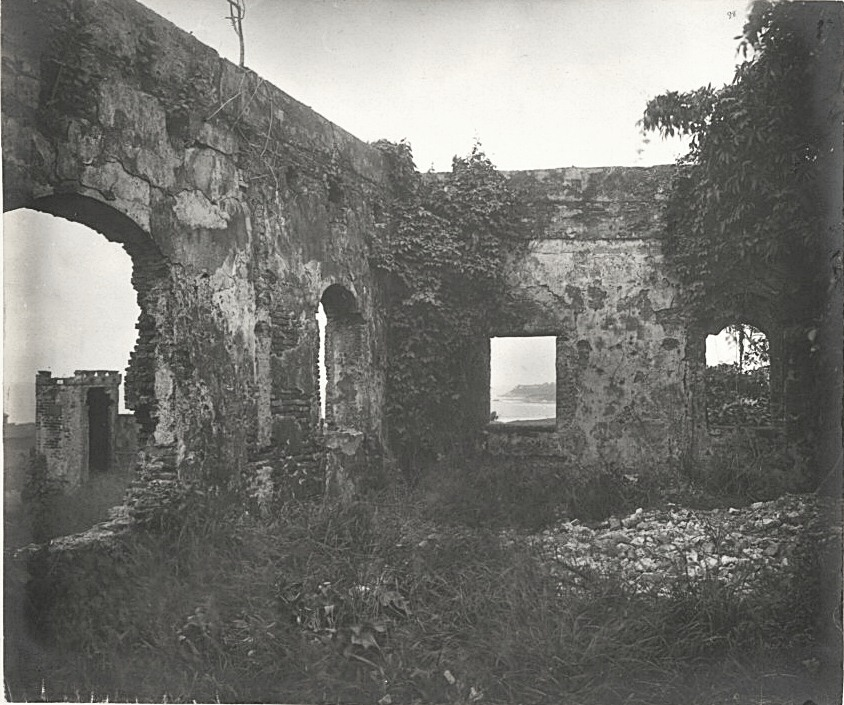
Quarters once inhabited by Willem Bosman, Fort Nassau, 1890s

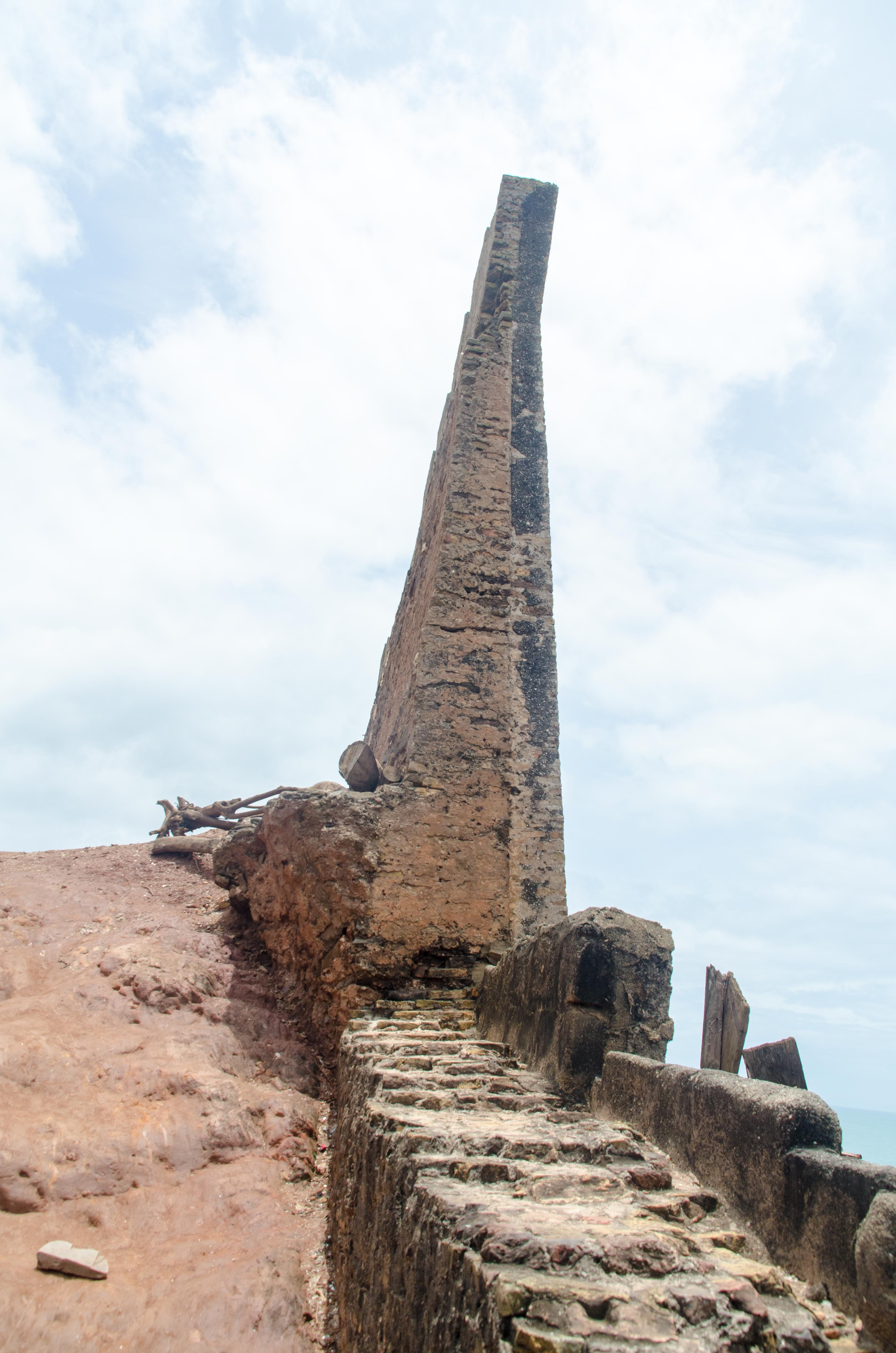
Remains of Fort Nassau

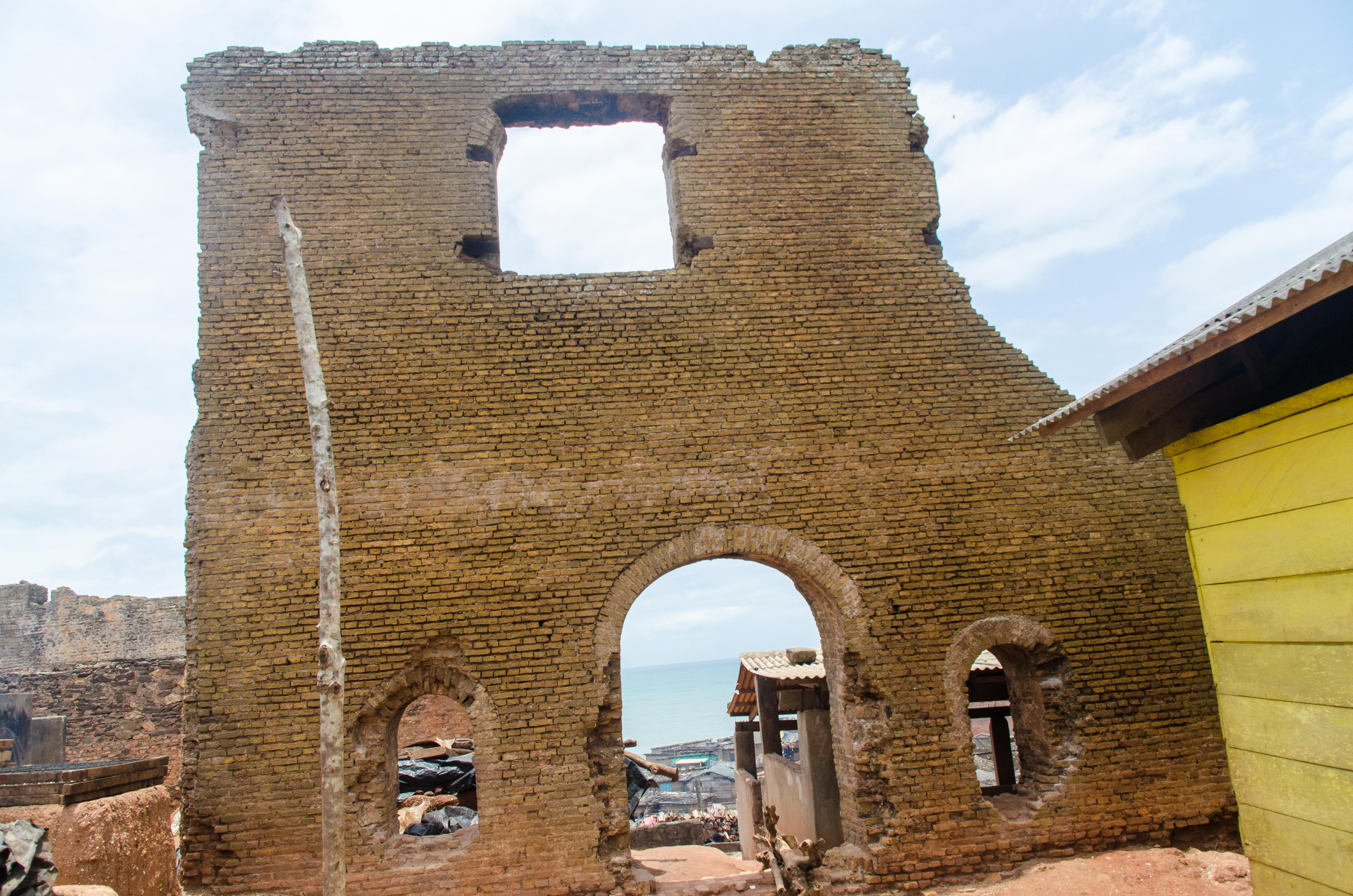
Ruins of Fort Nassau

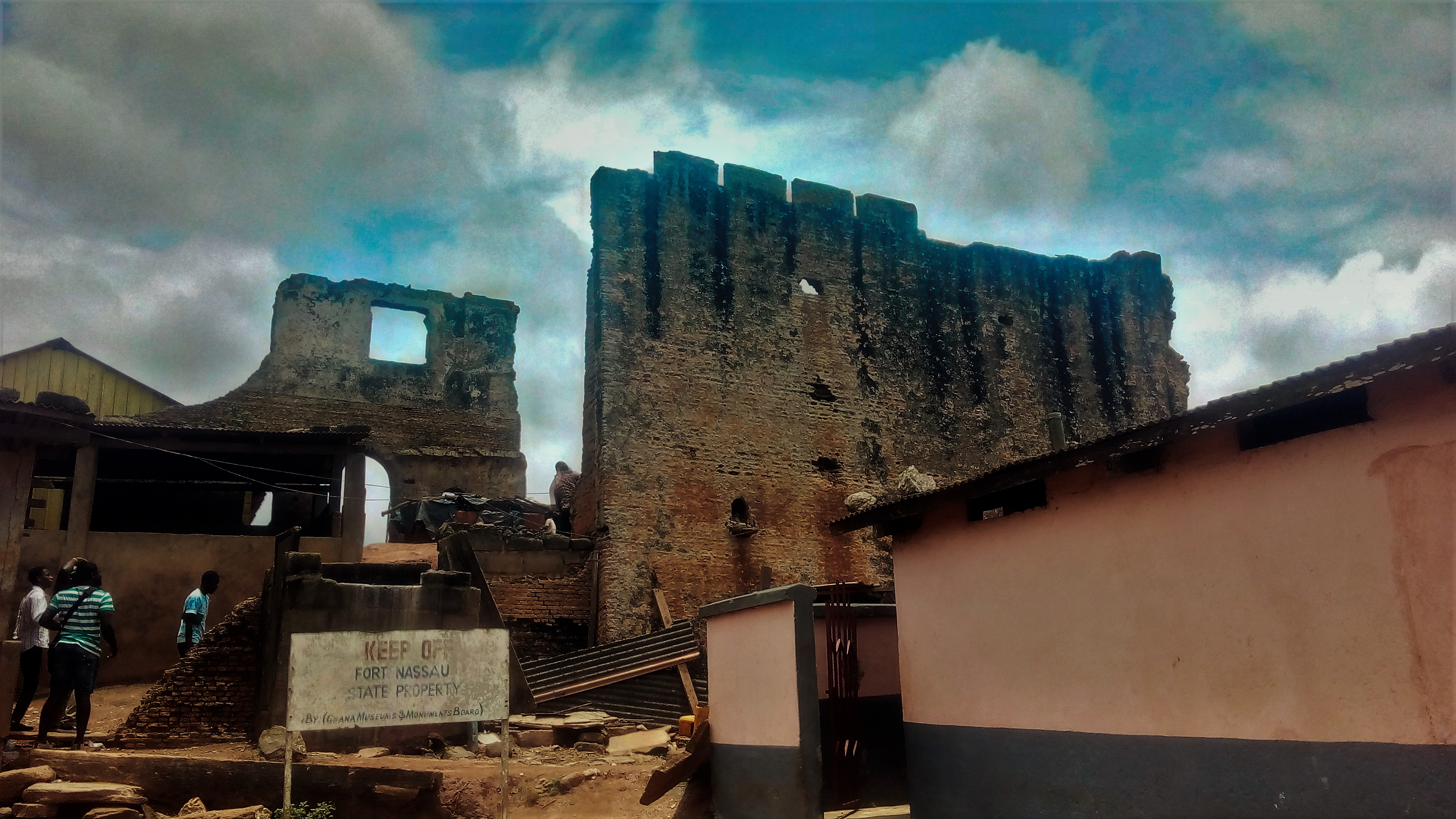
Ruins of Fort Nassau

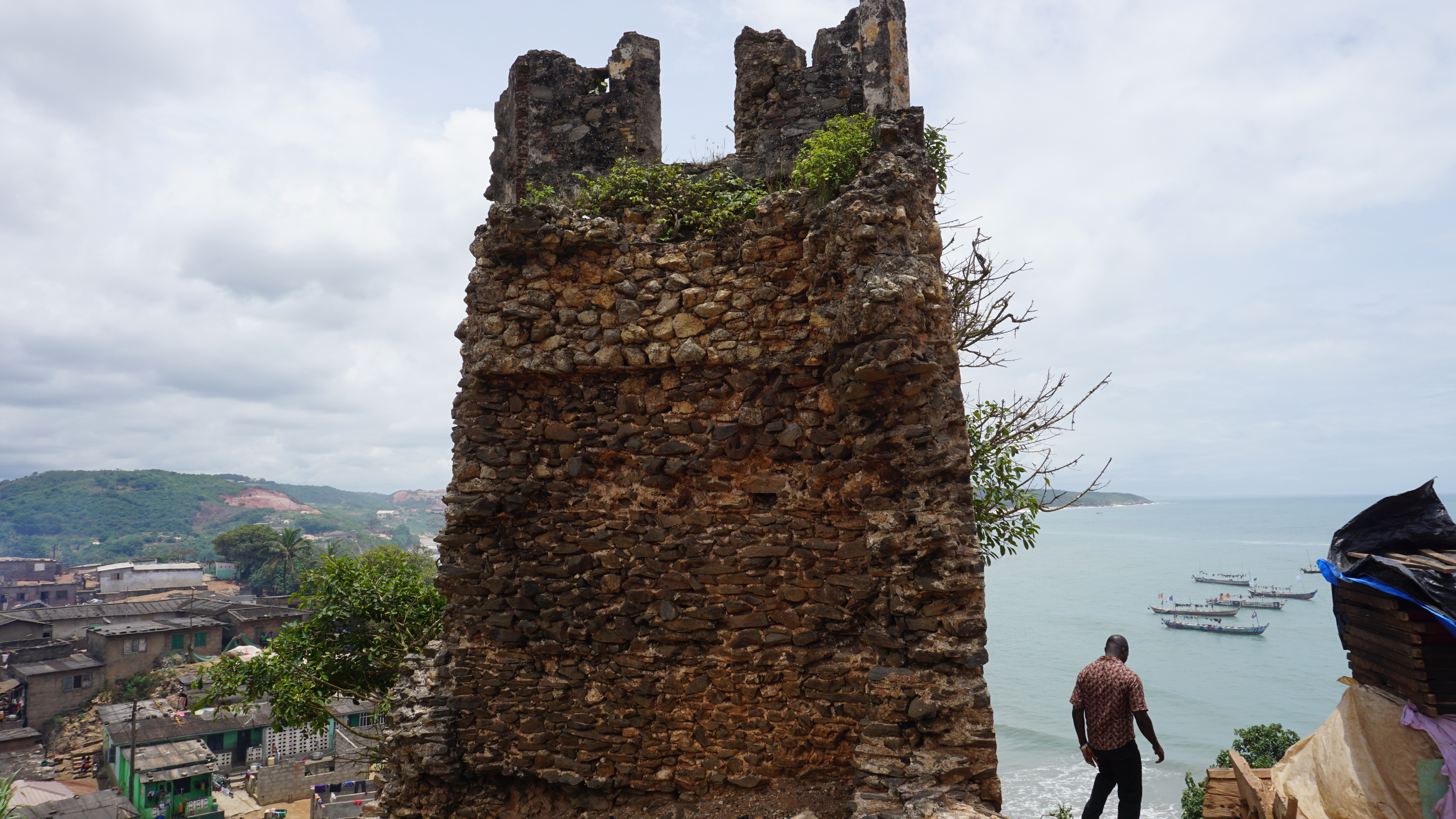
Ruins of Fort Nassau
