= Abura/Asebu/Kwamankese District =

- District
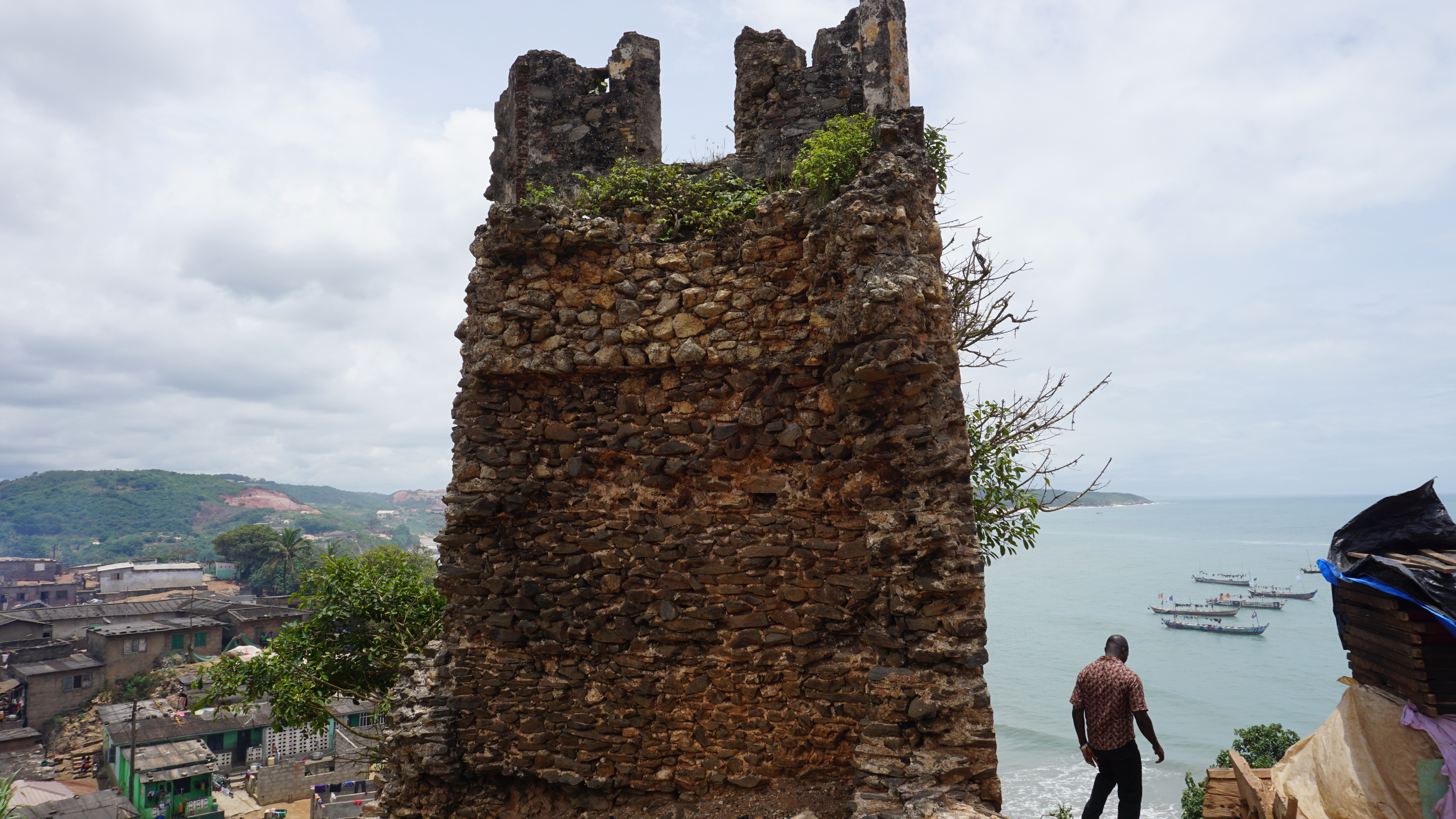
- Fort Nassau in Moree, Ghana

- Districts of Central Region

- Location of Abura/Asebu/Kwamankese District within Central
- Coordinates: 5°18′N 1°13′W
- Country: Ghana
- Region: Central
- Capital: Abura-Dunkwa

Government
  - District Executive: William Atta-Mends

Area
  - Total: 324 km^{2} (125 sq mi)

Population (2021)
  - Total: 124,465
  - Density: 384/km^{2} (995/sq mi)
- Time zone: UTC+0 (GMT)
- ISO 3166 code: GH-CP-AB

Abura/Asebu/Kwamankese District is one of the twenty-two districts in Central Region, Ghana. Originally created as an ordinary district assembly in 1988, which was created from the former Mfantsiman District Council. The district assembly is located in the southwest part of Central Region and has Essakyir as its capital town.

== History ==
The ancient Akan Asebu Kingdom was also situated in this District.

== Demographics ==
As of the 2021 Ghana census, Abura-Asebu-Kwamankese District had a population of 124,465.

== List of settlements ==
List of major settlements in the district:

Settlements of Abura/Asebu/Kwamankese District
No.	Settlement	Population	Population year
1	Abakrampa		
2	Aboenu		
3	Abura-Dunkwa		
4	Akonoma		
5	Amosima		
6	Asebu		
7	Asebu Ekroful		
8	Asuansi		
9	Ayeldu		
10	Batanyaa		
11	Brafoyaw		
12	Edumfa		
13	Katayiase		
14	Obohen/Odumasi		
15	Obokor		
16	New Ebu		
17	New Odonase		
18	Nyanfeku-Ekrofur		
19	Nyamedome		
20	Moree		
21	Abura Gyabankrom		
22	Abura Tayedo		
23	Abura Tuakwa		
24	Amoanda		
25	Kobina Ansa		
26	Odonase		
27	Abura Egotsia Kokodo		
28	Egotsia Bonmu		
29	Abora Aboase		
