= Moree, Ghana =

Moree Mori
- Village
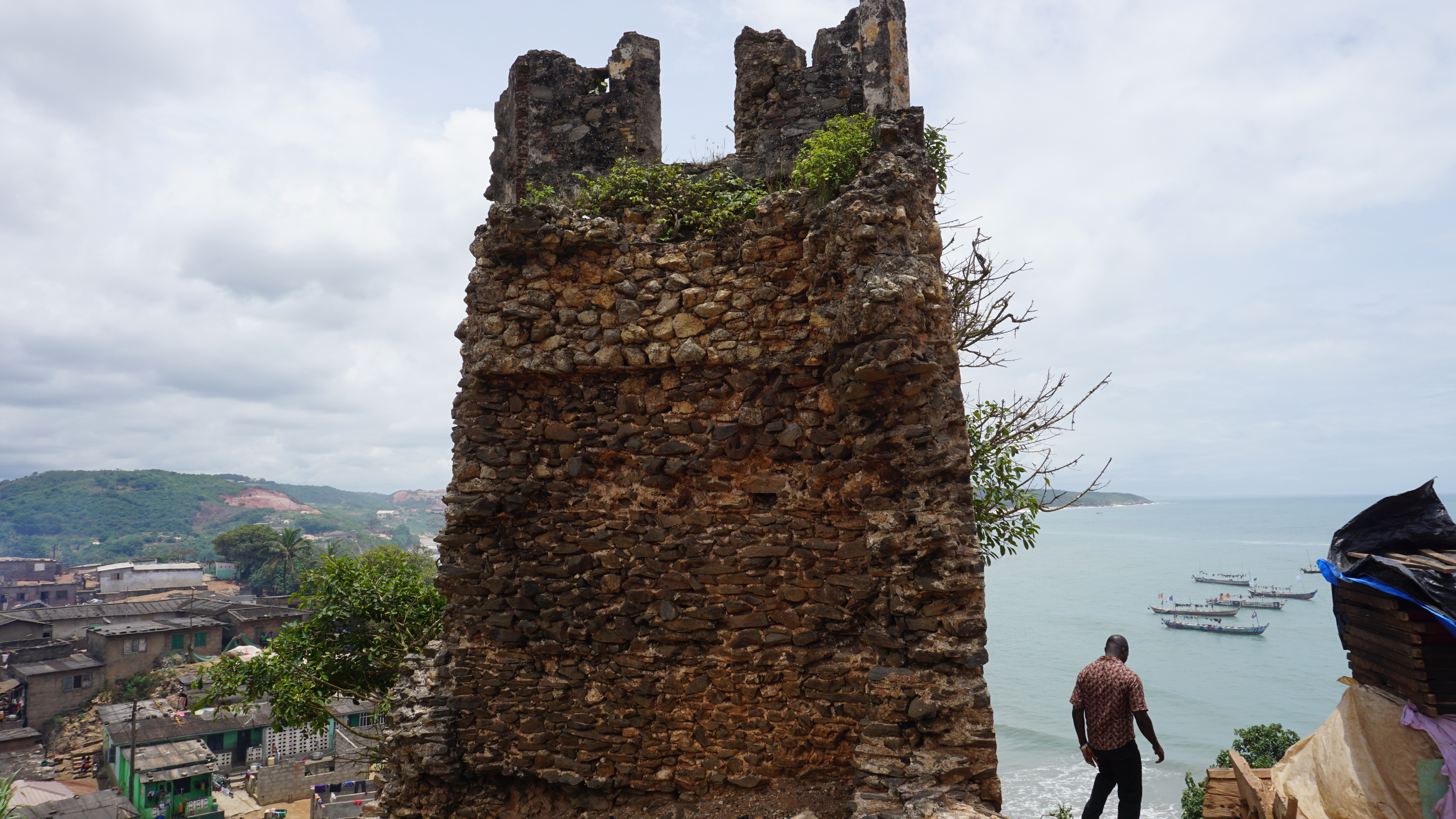
- Fort Nassau in Moree

- Location of Moree in Central Region, South Ghana
- Coordinates: 5°8′N 1°12′W
- Country: Ghana
- Region: Central Region
- District: Abura-Asebu-Kwamankese District
- Elevation: 13 m (43 ft)
- Time zone: GMT
  - Summer (DST): GMT

Moree (formerly also known as Mouri) is a town with small seaside resort in Abura-Asebu-Kwamankese district, a district in the Central Region of south Ghana. Moree was founded by giants Asebu Amanfi and his brother Farnyi Kwegya, and prolific hunter called Adzekese. Asebu Amanfi and Farnyi Kwegya were believed to have led an army that chased Israelites during the exodus. When their men drowned in the sea, they could not return to Pharaoh but fled Egypt with their family across Lake Chad to Nigeria and finally settled in Moree, then a village and small seaside resort in Ghana. Upon arrival in Moree, the Egyptian giants established their kingdom with prolific hunter, Adzekese. Asebu Amanfi was made the first King of the Asebu kingdom while Nana Adzekese became the first Chief of Moree. Moree developed around Fort Nassau, which was the original fort on their Gold Coast taken over by the Dutch West India Company when this was founded in 1621.
