= Angelina Baiden-Amissah =

Ghanaian educationist and politician

Former Mp for Shama (Ghana parliament constituency)
- In office 7 January 2001 – 6 January 2009
- President: John Aygekum Kufuor
- Preceded by: Richard Dornu Nartey
- Succeeded by: Gabriel Kodwo Essilfie

Former Deputy Minister of Education, Youth and Sports
- In office March 2006 – January 2009
- Succeeded by: Samuel Okudzeto Ablakwa

Personal details
- Born: 8 February 1958
- Died: 26 January 2025 (aged 66)
- Party: New Patriotic Party
- Children: 3
- Education: University of Education, Winneba; Ghana Institute of Management and Public Administration
- Occupation: Politician and Educationist

Angelina Baiden-Amissah (born 8 February 1954) is a Ghanaian politician and a former member of parliament for the Shama constituency in the Western Region of Ghana.

== Early life and education ==
Baiden-Amissah was born in Shama, Ghana in the Western Region (Ghana) and attended Mfantsiman Girls' Senior High School for her high school diploma.

In 1991, she earned a Bachelor of Education Degree with focus on Home Economics & Integrated Science, from the University College of Education. She later obtained a Post Graduate Certificate in "Leaders in Development: Managing Political & Economic Change" from the Harvard University.

Baiden-Amissah also obtained an Executive Master in Business Administration (EMBA) from the Ghana Institute of Management and Public Administration and other certifications in Pedagogy and Early Childhood Development.

== Politics ==
Baiden-Amissah was a member of the 4th parliament of the 4th republic as a representative of the Shama constituency. She was also a member of the 3rd parliament of the 4th republic of Ghana.

Her Political Career begun in 2000 when she contested in the 2000 Ghanaian General elections as a parliamentary candidate on the ticket of the New Patriotic Party. She won the seat in the 2000 Ghanaian General elections with a total of 8,284 votes making 31% of the total votes cast. She contested again during the 2004 General elections and retained her seat with a total of 14,782 votes. She contested again in the 2008 elections and lost her seat to Gabriel Kodwo Essilfie of the National Democratic congress.

Between 2001 and 2005, she was appointed as Deputy Minister of Education, Youth and Sports under the John Kufuor's government.

== Ambassadorial role ==
In 2021, Baiden-Amissah was appointed as Ghana's ambassador to Holy See

In 2023, Baiden-Amissah was appointed as Ghana's ambassador to the Republic of Republic of Croatia, with residence in Vatican City.

== Personal life ==
Baiden-Amissah is a Christian and married with three kids.

== Career ==
Baiden-Amissah was also a board member of the Ghana Cylinder manufacturing Company. She was also an educationist and a Deputy minister of Education, Science and Sports.
