= Richard Dornu Nartey =

Ghanaian politician

Hon. Richard Dornu Nartey

Mp for Shama
- In office 7 January 1992 – 6 January 2000
- President: John Jerry Rawlings
- Preceded by: Ernest Nii Tachie-Otoo
- Succeeded by: Angelina Baiden-Amissah

Personal details
- Born: 26 April 1949 (age 77)
- Party: National Democratic Congress
- Education: University of Ghana GIMPA
- Occupation: Politician
- Profession: administrator

Richard Dornu Nartey (born 26 April 1949) is a Ghanaian politician and member of parliament for the first and second parliament of the fourth republic of Ghana. He represented Shama in the Western region of Ghana.

== Early life and education ==
Nartey was born in 1949 at Shama, Ghana. He studied at the University of Ghana and the Ghana Institute of Management and Public Administration where he gained his Bachelors of Arts degree in English, Russian and linguistics and postgraduate diploma in public administration respectively.

== Politics ==
Nartey was first voted into Ghanaian parliament during the 1992 Ghanaian general elections. He was a member of the first parliament of the fourth republic of Ghana.Shama constituency was holding by Ernest Nii Tachie-Otoo of the Action Congress Party (ACP) in 1979. He was voted into power on the ticket of the National Democratic Congress. In 1992, some major political parties in Ghana boycotted the general elections making most of the candidates of the National Democratic Congress the majority in parliament. During the 1996 Ghanaian general elections, he won with 12,756 votes representing 39.70% out of the total votes cast. He won the seat against Ernest Nii Tackie-Otoo of the Convention Peoples Party with 6,648 votes representing 20.70%, Angelina Baiden Amissah of the New Patriotic Party with 5,934 votes representing 18.50% and Paul Kingsley Awotwi of the Peoples National Convention with 527 votes representing 1.60% of the total votes cast. He was the majority chief whip in parliament of the first parliament of the fourth republic of Ghana. Consequently, during the 2000 Ghanaian general elections he lost the Shama seat to Angelina Baiden Amissah of the New Patriotic Party.

He called on stakeholders in the democratic process to adopt consensus building to further the country's development in 1997. He spoke at a symposium organized by the National Commission for Civic Education (NCCE) on the theme, ''Practicalising Democratic Culture - Current Issues'' in Sekondi.

== Career ==
He is a former member of parliament from 7 January 1993 to 7 January 2001 for Shama constituency, a former Deputy minister for Lands and Forestry. He is also an Administrator.

== Personal life ==
Nartey is married and a Christian.

== See also ==
- List of Mps elected in the 1992 Ghanaian parliamentary elections
- List of Mps elected in the 1996 Ghanaian parliamentary elections
