= Fort Gross Fredericksburg =

Ghanaian fortification

Coordinates: 4.7911°N 2.1339°W

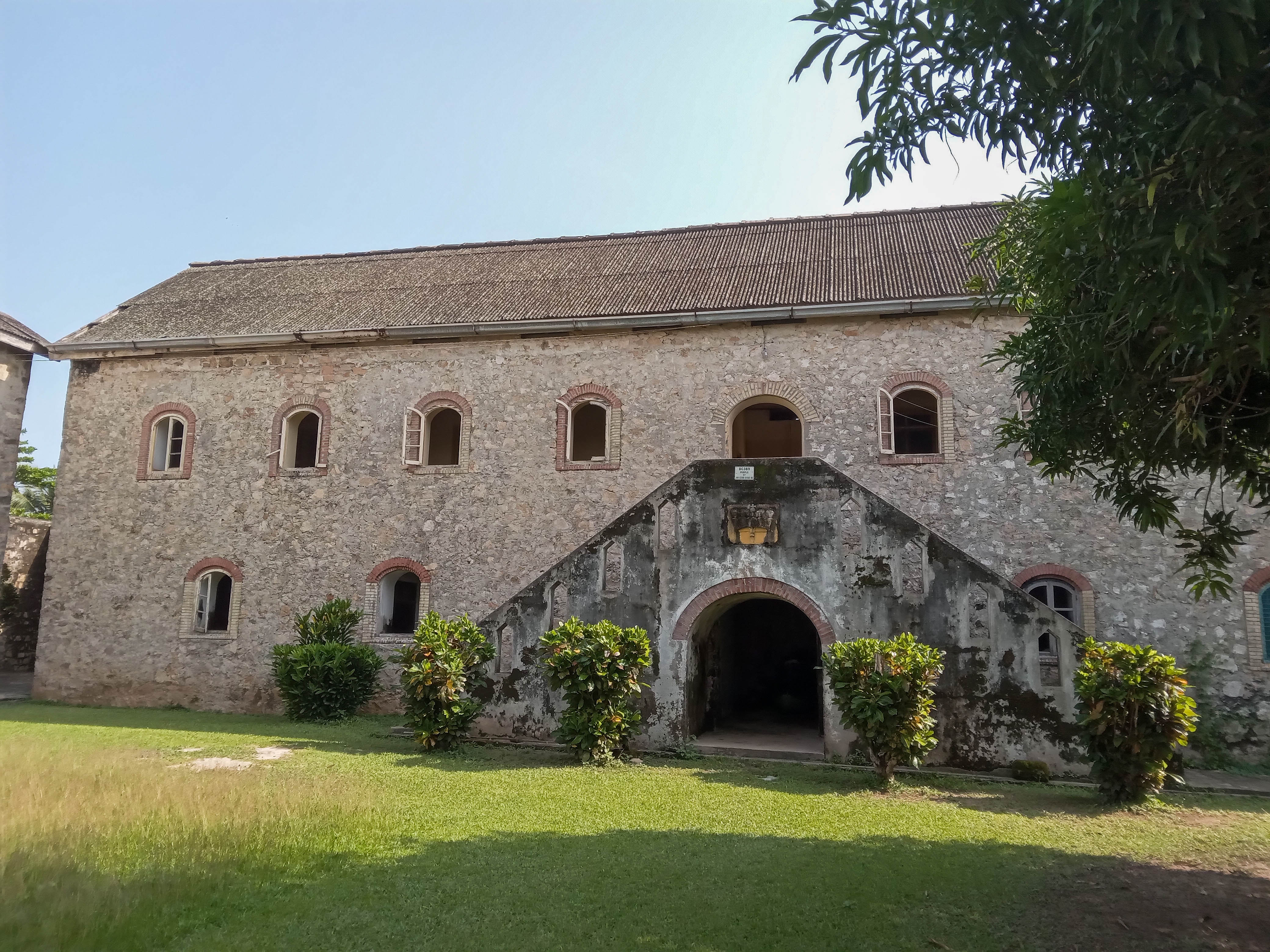
Fort Gross Fredericksburg at Princestown

Fort Gross Fredericksburg, is a fortification located in Princestown, in the Western Region of Ghana. The Brandenburg Africa Company, led by Benjamin Raule, under the patronage of Frederick William of Brandenburg (for whom the fort was named), built Fort Gross Fredericksburg in 1683–1684 as their headquarters. The fort is the only fort in Ghana of German construction.

== History ==
John Canoe, an Akan merchant, learned in 1708 that the Germans planned to sell the fort to the Dutch. In protest, he organized a resistance that lasted nearly 20 years and repelled battleship fleets. Eventually the Dutch seized the fort in 1725 and called it “Hollandia.” Residents saw John Canoe as a hero since he was successful in holding possession of the fort. The Dutch gave the fort to Britain in 1872, and it became part of Ghana’s newly independent country in 1957.

Fort Gross Fredericksburg was one of two German forts built in Ghana, the other being Fort Dorothea, and was made of stone imported by sea from Prussia between 1681 and 1683. It is believed that around 300,000 Africans have been transported through this fort. John Canoe’s whereabouts are unknown. Some claim he was captured after losing the fight of the fort, while others claim his remains are buried in Kumasi’s Tafo Cemetery.

== Gallery ==
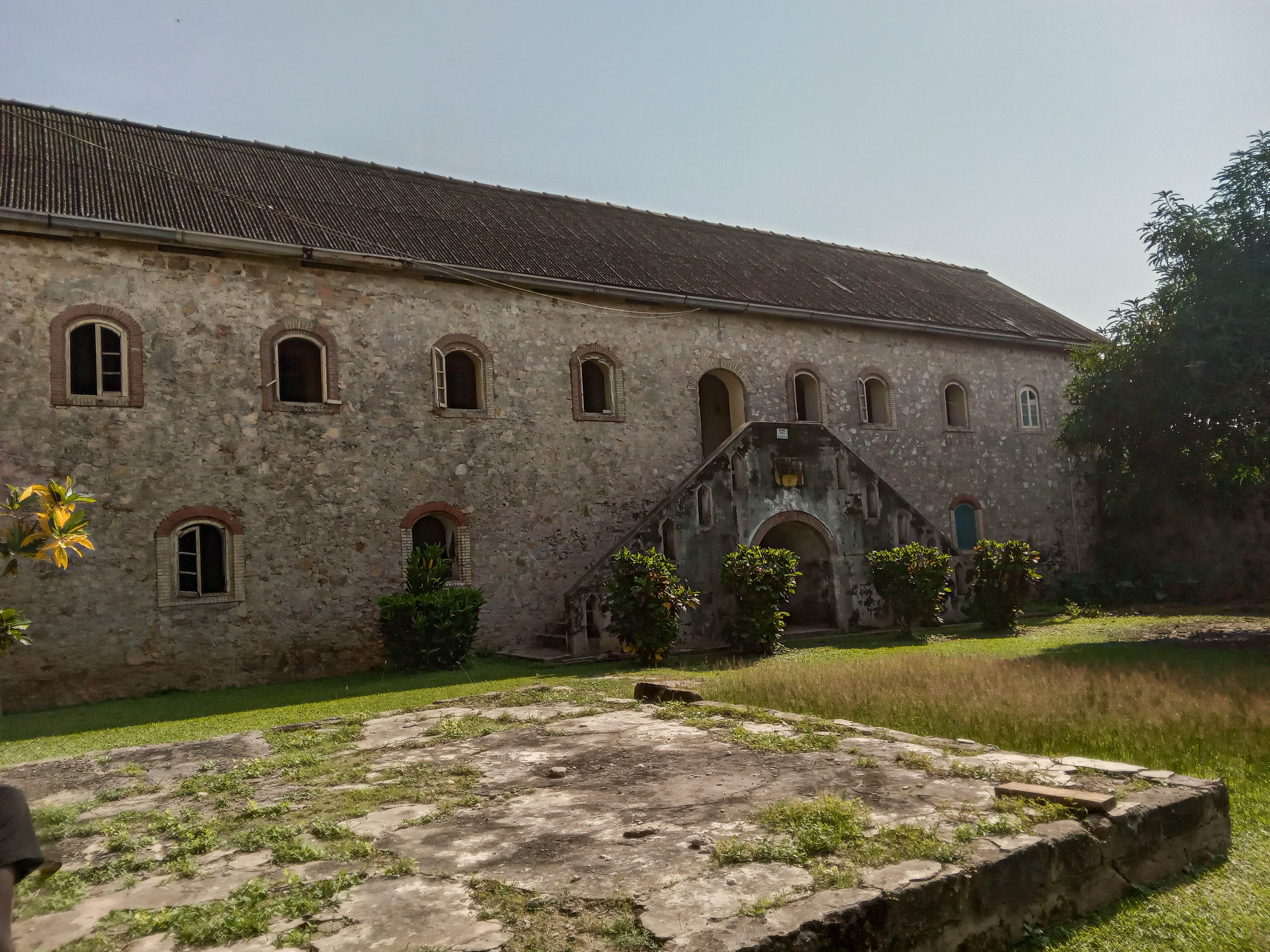
Fort Gross Fredericksburg at Princestown

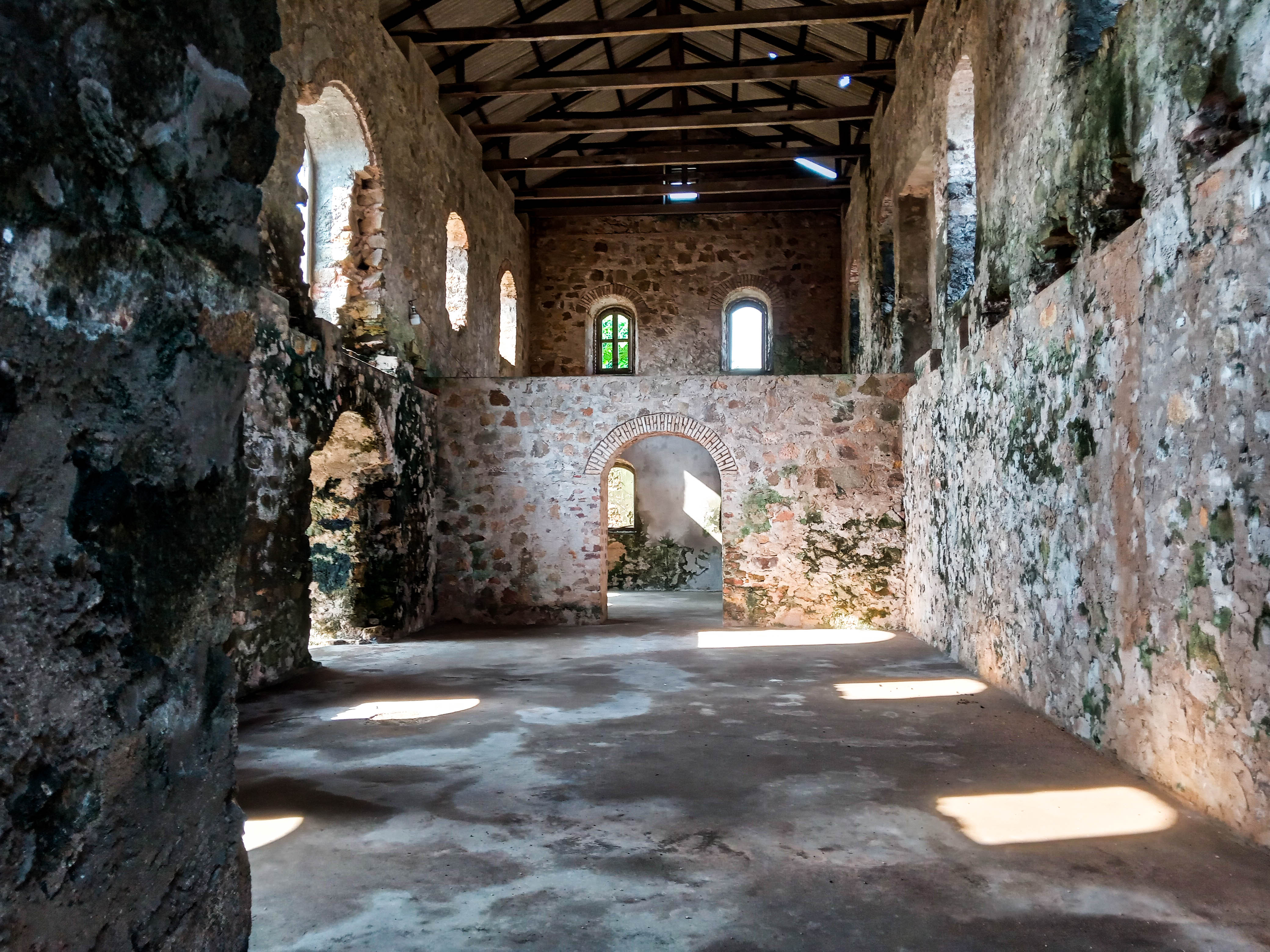
Inside Fort Gross Fredericksburg

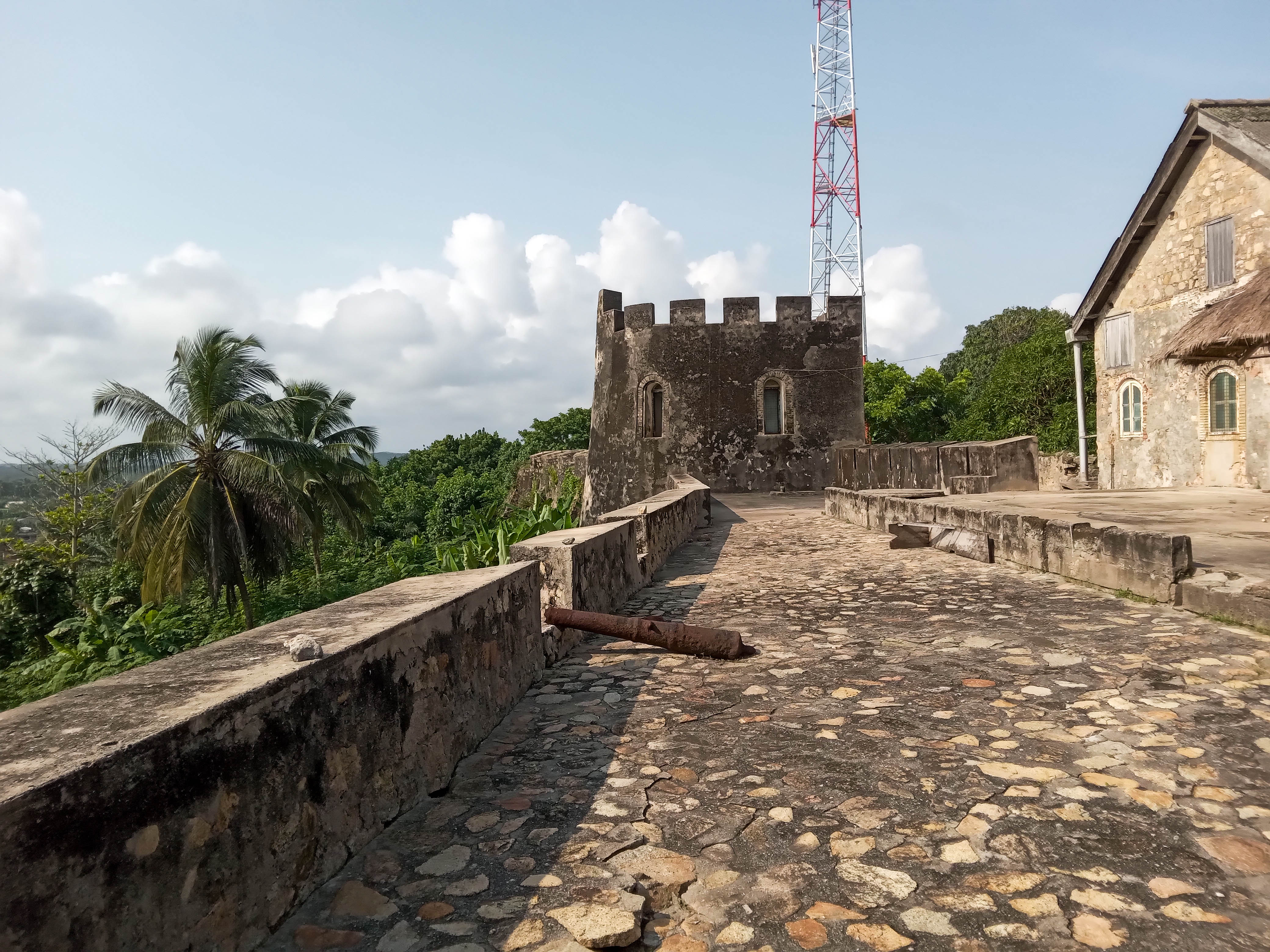
Fort Gross Fredericksburg

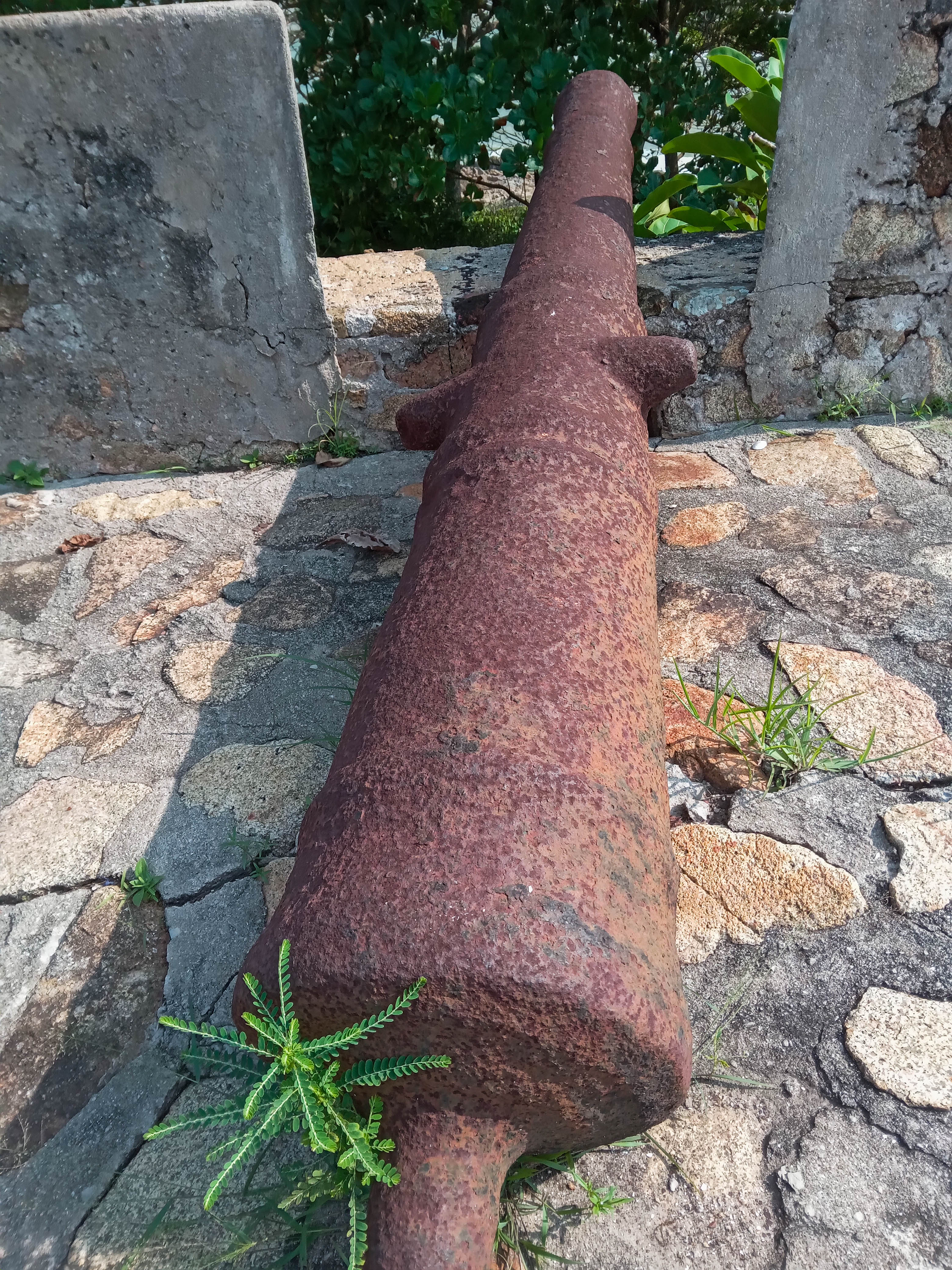
Cannon ball at Fort Fredericksburg
