= Shama Senior High School =

Location
- P. O. Box 30 Shama W/R; Shama; Western Region; Shama; Ghana

Information
- School type: Public High School High School
- Motto: Dzin Pa Sen Ahonya
- Established: 1990
- Status: active
- School district: Shama District
- Oversight: Ministry of Education
- School number: +233 20 815 0083
- Head of school: Eugenia Elsie Dodoo
- Head teacher: Eugenia Elsie Dodoo
- Gender: Mixed Gender
- Age: 14 to 18
- Classes offered: General Science, General Arts, Business, Visual Arts, Agricultural Science, and Home Economics
- Houses: 4
- Slogan: Icons of Excellence.
- Alumni: Reuben Griffiths Bekoe

Shama High School is a coeducational senior high school at Shama in the Shama District of the Western Region of Ghana.

== History ==
The School was founded in 1990 as a result of the 1988 Educational Reforms in the Shama District Assembly, Shama.
