= Ernest Nii Tachie-Otoo =

Ghanaian politician

Hon. Ernest Nii Tackie-Otoo Dr.

Member of Parliament for Shama Constituency 1979–81
- President: Hilla Limann
- Preceded by: Benjamin Edwin Quansah
- Succeeded by: Richard Dornu Nartey

Personal details
- Died: 2 December 1999
- Party: People's Convention Party, Action Congress Party, Convention People's Party
- Occupation: Banker / politician
- Profession: Lawyer

Safohen Dr. Ernest Nii Tackie-Otoo (affectionately known as Uncle Nii), was a Ghanaian politician and Member of Parliament in the 3rd Republic of Ghana representing the Shama Constituency.

== Career ==
Tachie-Otoo was a lawyer by profession. He was also the President of the Western and Central Chapters of the Association for Rural Banks. He was also former board chairman of the Lower Pra Rural Bank Limited.

== Politics ==
Tachie-Otoo was a member of the People's Convention Party. He was also a member of Action Congress Party. He was the Member of Parliament for the Shama Constituency. He was also a former Western Regional Chairman of the People's Convention Party. In 1996, he again contested for the Shama Constituency parliamentary seat on the ticket of Convention People's Party and lost to Richard Dornu Nartey.

== Personal life ==
Tachie-Otoo was married to Matilda Tachie-Otoo. They had 36 children, 48 grandchildren and 3 great-grandchildren.

== Death ==
Tachie-Otoo died on 2 December 1999 and was buried on 19 February 2000 at the Nyakrom Royal Cemetery in Shama.
