= Ngyerasia =

Community in Western Region, Ghana

Ngyerasia Ngyirasia
- Town
- Country: Ghana
- Region: Western Region
- District: Sekondi-Takoradi Metropolis
- Time zone: UTC0 (GMT)

Ngyerasia (also known as Ngyirasia) is a community in the Sekondi-Takoradi Metropolis in the Western Region of Ghana. As of 2024, the Assembly member of the community was Gabriel Ato Mensah.

== Explosion ==
On 19 May 2024, there was an explosion of premix fuel in the community which injured about sixteen people. Two people later died after succumbing to their injuries.
