= Brandenburger Gold Coast =

Prussian colony located in modern Ghana, 1683–1721

Coordinates: 4°45′13″N 2°04′01″W

Brandenburger Gold Coast (1682–1701) Prussian Gold Coast (1701–1721)
- 1682–1721
- Flag

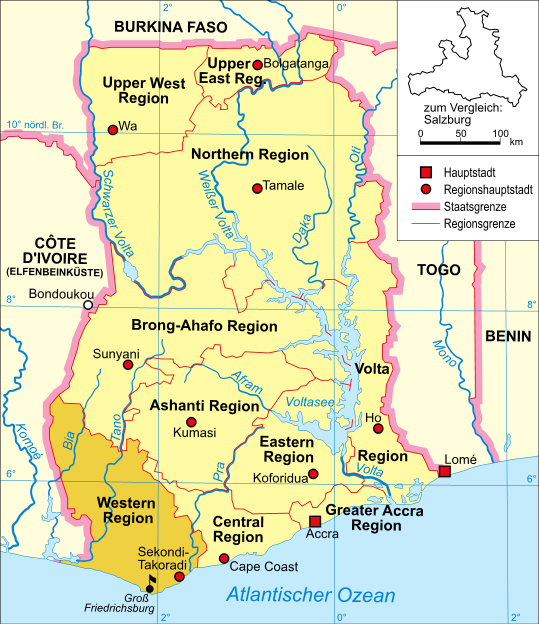
- Location of Groß-Friedrichsburg within Gold Coast, modern-day Ghana, marked by the black dot and flag.

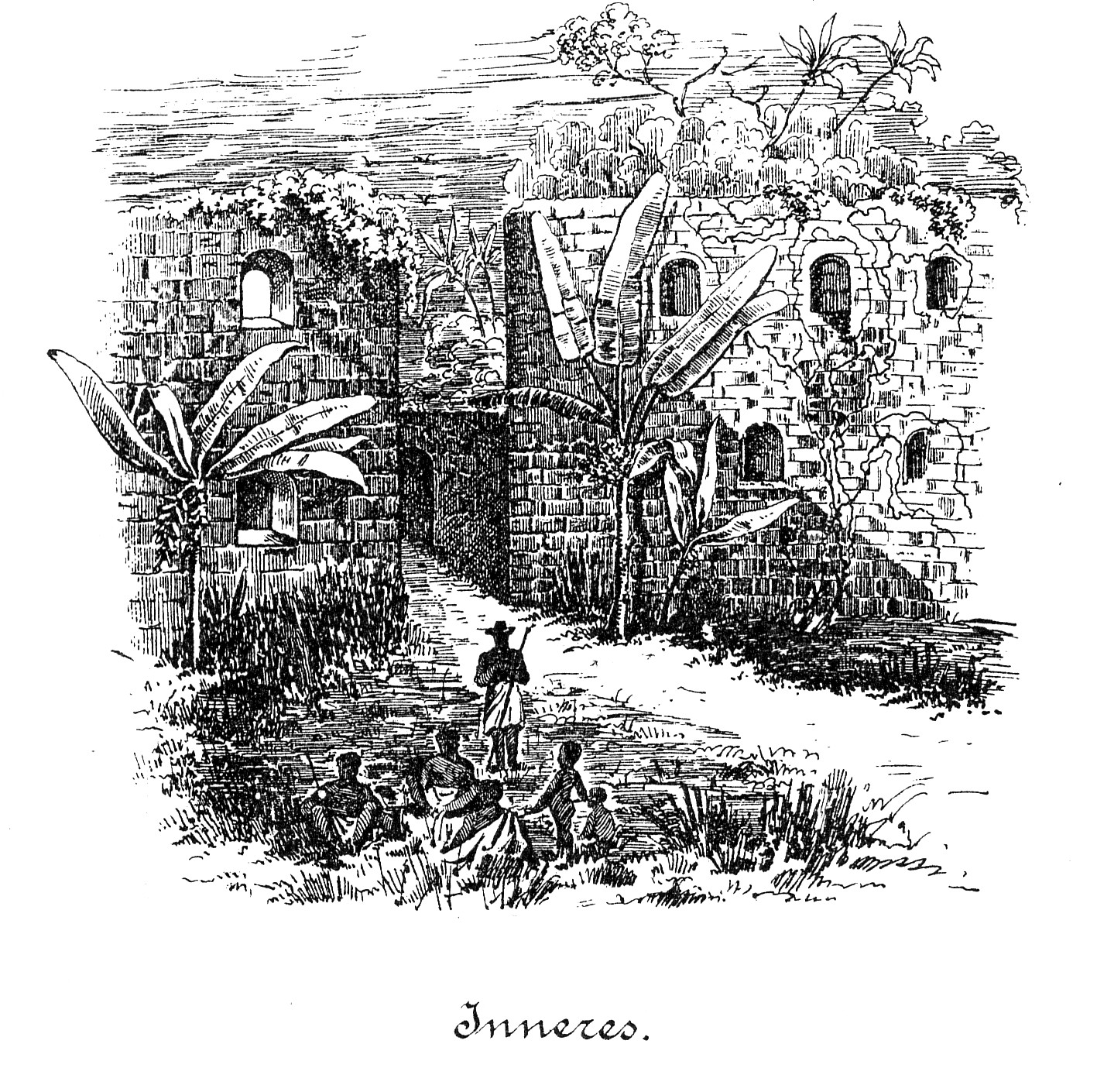
- Inside Groß-Friedrichsburg. View in February 1884.
- Status: Brandenburger colony (1682–1701); Prussian colony (1701–1721)
- Capital: Groß Friedrichsburg
- Common languages: German, Akan
- Religion: Protestantism, Roman Catholicism, Akan religion
- Elector of Brandenburg, later King of Prussia
  - 1640–1688 (Founded colony in 1682): Frederick William
  - 1688–1713: Frederick I
  - 1713–1740 (Sold colony to Dutch in 1721): Frederick William I
- History
  - Foundation of Brandenburg African Company: May 1682
  - Renamed Prussian Gold Coast Settlements: 15 January 1701
  - Sold to Netherlands: 1721
Succeeded by
Dutch Gold Coast
- Today part of: Ghana

The Brandenburger Gold Coast, later Prussian Gold Coast, was a colony of Brandenburg-Prussia, later the Kingdom of Prussia, on the Gold Coast. The Brandenburg colony existed from 1682 to 1701, after which it became a Prussian colony from 1701 to 1721. In 1721, King Frederick William I of Prussia sold it for 7,200 ducats and 12 slaves to the Dutch West India Company.

== Brandenburger Gold Coast ==
In May 1682, the German colonization of Africa began when the newly founded Brandenburg African Company (BAC, in German Brandenburgisch-Afrikanische Compagnie), a company that administered the colony, which had been granted a charter by Frederick William, Elector of Brandenburg (core of the later Kingdom of Prussia), established a small West African colony consisting of two Gold Coast settlements on the Gulf of Guinea, around Cape Three Points in present Ghana:

- Groß Friedrichsburg, also called Hollandia, now Pokesu: (1682–1717), which became the capital
- Fort Dorothea, also called Accada, now Akwida: (April 1684 – 1687, 1698–1711, April 1712 – 1717), which from 1687 to 1698 and 1711–April 1712 the Dutch occupied

=== Governors during the Brandenburger era ===
- May 1682 – 1683 – Philip Peterson Blonck
- 1683–1684 – Nathaniel Dillinger
- 1684–1686 – Karl Konstantin von Schnitter
- 1686–1691 – Johann Niemann

== Prussian Gold Coast ==
On 15 January 1701, the small colony was renamed Prussian Gold Coast Settlements, in connection with the founding of the Kingdom of Prussia, which formally took place three days later, when Frederick III, Elector of Brandenburg and Duke of Prussia, crowned himself King in Prussia (after which he became known as Frederick I of Prussia).

From 1711 to April 1712, the Dutch occupied Fort Dorothea. In 1717, the Prussian Gold Coast colony was physically abandoned by Prussia; from then until 1724, John Konny (in Dutch Jan Conny) occupied Groß Friedrichsburg, despite the sale of the colony to the Dutch in 1721.

=== Governors during the Prussian era ===
- 1701–1704 – Adriaan Grobbe
- 1704–1706 – Johann Münz
- 1706–1709 – Heinrich Lamy
- 1709–1710 – Frans de Lange
- 1710–1716 – Nicholas Dubois
- 1716–1717 – Anton Günther van der Menden

== Ambitions of the colony ==
Prussia was the last major European power, and first German state, to enter transatlantic trade. It was relatively isolated from major European trade hubs at the time, so the incentive existed to enter transatlantic trade and fortify the Prussian economy.

The colony was founded for many reasons, mainly: for Prussia to increase its gold reserves, to supply slaves for Prussia's entry in the Atlantic slave trade, and to engage in gum arabic and ostrich feathers trade. Yet shortly after its founding, it was soon realized that the greatest profits could only be made from human cargo trade as gold had eventually run scarce in the area, so the focus of the colony was put almost exclusively on trading slaves.

Prussia also leased part of the island Saint Thomas in the Caribbean (present-day part of the U.S. Virgin Islands) from the Kingdom of Denmark as a colony to which it could transport slaves, and thus a transatlantic trade between the Prussian Gold Coast and the Caribbean was born.

== Sale to the Dutch ==
In 1721, after 39 years of Prussian rule, Frederick William I of Prussia sold the colony to the Dutch West India Company for 7,200 ducats and 12 enslaved boys in gold chains. Frederick William I had no personal ties to the colony and saw it as a drain on his kingdom's resources. The Dutch West India Company subsequently renamed the colony "Hollandia" and integrated it into the Dutch Gold Coast. By this time the Brandenburg African Company had lost all but one of its ships at the colony due to Dutch and French seizures, and competition primarily with a growing Dutch presence in the area lowered Prussian revenues. Prussia's slave output was, at its peak, less than a quarter of their Dutch counterparts. Resources going into the colony were restricted as it neared its end.

== See also ==
- Princes Town, Ghana
- German colonial projects before 1871
