= Emelia Arthur =

Ghanaian politician

Hon. Emelia Arthur

Minister for Fisheries and Aquaculture
- Incumbent
- Assumed office January 2025
- President: John Dramani Mahama

Member of Parliament for Shama
- Incumbent
- Assumed office 7 January 2025

Deputy Western Regional Minister
- In office 2009 – January 2013
- President: John Evans Atta Mills

Personal details
- Party: National Democratic Congress
- Occupation: Politician

Emelia Arthur (born 1 October 1966) is a Ghanaian politician and development specialist.

Emelia Arthur is a consultant and former Advisor to the President of Ghana from 2013 to 2017 where she assisted presidential appointees in aligning manifesto objectives with presidential objectives and specific sector policy goals.

She is currently serving as the Minister for Fisheries and Aquaculture and the Member of Parliament (MP) for the Shama constituency.

She is a member of the National Democratic Congress (NDC). She previously served as the Deputy Western Regional Minister and as the District Chief Executive for Shama. Arthur is passionate about inclusive governance, strengthening institutional capacity, and youth empowerment. This passion has enabled her to facilitate trainings for international organizations on leadership, gender policies, and inclusion.

== Early life and education ==
Emelia Arthur was born in Shama in the Western Region of Ghana. She is a Yale World Fellow (2002) and holds a Master’s degree in Public Administration. Her academic and professional background is rooted in natural resource governance, gender inclusion, and sustainable development. Arthur is recognized as a prominent voice in revolutionizing Ghana’s fisheries sector, applying community-centered leadership skills in her role.

== Political career ==
Emelia Arthur began her career in local governance, notably serving as the District Chief Executive (DCE) for the Shama District.

In January 2025, President John Dramani Mahama appointed Arthur as the Minister for Fisheries and Aquaculture. During her vetting and subsequent assumption of office, she outlined a "Blue Economy Initiative" aimed at sustainably managing Ghana's marine and freshwater resources.

She was appointed by President John Evans Atta Mills to serve as the Deputy Western Regional Minister, a role she held until the end of the administration's first term in January 2013. Following this, she served as a Presidential Staffer and Advisor to the President from 2013 to 2017, focusing on policy alignment and manifesto implementation.

In the December 2024 general elections, Emelia Arthur contested the Shama constituency seat on the ticket of the National Democratic Congress. She won the election with 57% of the total votes cast, defeating the incumbent to represent the constituency in the 9th Parliament of the Fourth Republic.

== Policy and advocacy ==
As Minister, Emelia Arthur has focused on several critical areas within Ghana's maritime sector:

- EU "Yellow Card": She has pledged to expedite reforms to address the European Union's concerns regarding Illegal, Unreported, and Unregulated (IUU) fishing. This includes a major review of the Fisheries Act (Act 625) to strengthen sanctions and improve transparency.
- Aquaculture Development: Arthur has emphasized aquaculture as a sustainable alternative to declining marine stocks, launching initiatives such as the "Tilapia and Catfish Friday" to promote local consumption and support small-scale fish farmers.
- Sustainability: She has advocated for the use of Electronic Monitoring Systems (EMS) on industrial trawlers and the establishment of Marine Protected Areas (MPAs) to restore fish populations.
