= Benjamin Edwin Quansah =

Ghanaian politician

Member of the Ghana Parliament for Shama
- In office 1969–1972
- Preceded by: Christiana Wilmot
- Succeeded by: Ernest Nii Tachie-Otoo

Personal details
- Born: Gold Coast
- Citizenship: Ghana
- Occupation: Politician

Benjamin Edwin Quansah is a Ghanaian politician and member of the first parliament of the second republic of Ghana representing the Shama Constituency under the membership of the Progress Party (PP).

== Politics ==
Quansah entered parliament in 1969, after winning the Shama parliamentary seat during the 1969 parliamentary election on the ticket of the Progress Party (PP). During the election, Quansah polled 5,616 votes, against Ghapson Kwesi of the National Alliance of Liberals (NAL) who polled 1,503 votes, and Kodwo Effirim Nunoo of the People's Action Party (PAP) who polled 343 votes. After being pronounced winner at the 1969 Ghanaian parliamentary election held on 26 August 1969, he was sworn into the First Parliament of the Second Republic of Ghana on 1 October 1969. He served as a member of parliament until 13 January 1972 when the Busia government was overthrown.
