= Agona Nkwanta =

- District Capital
- Location in Ghana
- Coordinates: 4.8883°N 1.9658°W
- Country: Ghana
- Region: Western Region
- District: Ahanta West District

Population (2010)
  - Total: 14,104

Agona Nkwanta is the capital of Ahanta West District in Ghana.

== Details ==
Agona, also known as Agona Junction or Agona Nkwanta, is 7 km inland and along the Takoradi and Tarkwa road, with a branch road off to Dixcove, Achowa, Akwidaa and Busua. According to the Ghana Statistical Service's 2010 Population and Housing Census, the population of Agona Nkwanta was 14,104.

Agona is one of the fastest growing towns in the Western Region according to studies.

The only senior high school in Agona is Baidoo Bonsoe Senior High Technical School.
