= Gabriel Kodwo Essilfie =

Ghanaian politician (born 1950)

- Preceded by: Angelina Baiden Amissah
- Succeeded by: Ato Panford

MP for Shama
- In office 7 January 2009 – 6 January 2017

Personal details
- Born: 10 January 1950 (age 76)
- Party: National Democratic Congress
- Children: 4
- Education: Glassboro State College (Rowan University)
- Occupation: Politician
- Profession: Accountant

Gabriel Kodwo Essilfie (born 10 January 1950) is a Ghanaian politician and member of the Sixth Parliament of the Fourth Republic of Ghana representing the Shama Constituency in the Western Region on the ticket of the National Democratic Congress.

== Personal life ==
Essilfie is a Christian and fellowship at Methodist church. He is married (with four children).

== Early life ==
Essilfie was born on 10 January 1950. He hails from Abuesi, a town in the Western Region of Ghana. He entered the Glassboro State College (Rowan University), New Jersey, in US, and obtained his bachelor's degree in accounting.

== Politics ==
Essilfie is a member of the National Democratic Congress (NDC). In 2012, he contested for the Shama seat on the ticket of the NDC sixth parliament of the fourth republic and won. In parliament he has served on various committees, including Committee member of Finance, Food, Agriculture and Cocoa Affairs.

== Career ==
He is an accountant. He is the founder and chief executive officer of Gabdor Consultants Inc. in Pennsauken Township, New Jersey.
