= Princes Town, Ghana =

Princes Town Pokesu
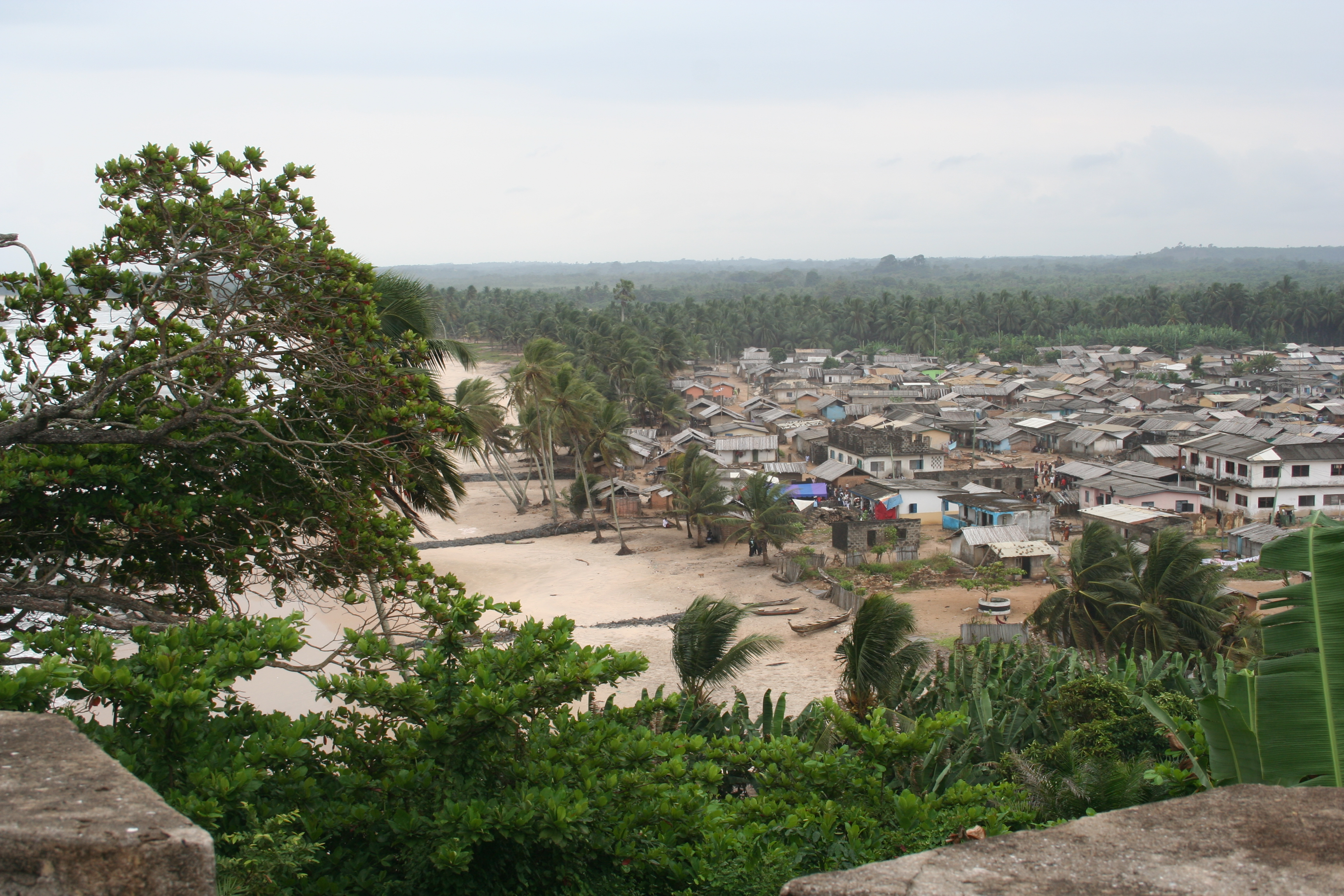

- Location of Princes Town in Western Region
- Coordinates: 4°47′37″N 2°8′5″W
- Country: Ghana
- Region: Western Region
- District: Ahanta West District
- Elevation: 0 m (0 ft)
- Time zone: GMT
  - Summer (DST): GMT
- Ghana Post GPS: WH-2286
- Area code: 03121

Princes Town or Pokesu is located 5 km east of Fort Saint Antonio on Manfro Hill in the Ahanta West District of the Western Region of south Ghana, Africa. It lies between Axim to the west and Sekondi-Takoradi to the east.

It was originally developed by Germans as a colonial fort in the late 17th century. On 1 January 1681, a Brandenburger expedition of two ships commanded by Otto Friedrich von der Groeben arrived in the Gold Coast and began to build a strong fort between Axim and the Cape of Three Points. The fort was completed in 1683 and was named Fort Fredericksburg (German: Groß Friedrichsburg, Groß-Friedrichsburg, Großfriedrichsburg) in honour of Prince Frederick William I, Elector of Brandenburg. Because the fort was named after a prince, it has been referred to as Princes Town. The fort was to be the headquarters of the Brandenburgers in Africa.

Fort Fredericksburg was a part of the Brandenburger Gold Coast colony during its years from 1682-1721.

== History ==
By 1717, an Akan merchant, John Canoe, learned that the Prussians were going to sell the fort, part of the Brandenburger Gold Coast colony, to the Dutch. In protest, he began a resistance that managed to stave off fleets of warships for approximately seven years. The fort was eventually captured in 1724 by the Dutch and renamed "Hollandia". Because John Canoe was successful in retaining control of the fort, inhabitants looked upon him as a hero. In 1872, the Dutch ceded the fort to Britain and in 1957, the fort became part of the newly independent country of Ghana.

"Junkanoo" dancing/parade festivals, named after John Canoe, are held annually in the coastal outlines of North Carolina, in Jamaica and the Bahamas.

== Fort Fredericksburg ==
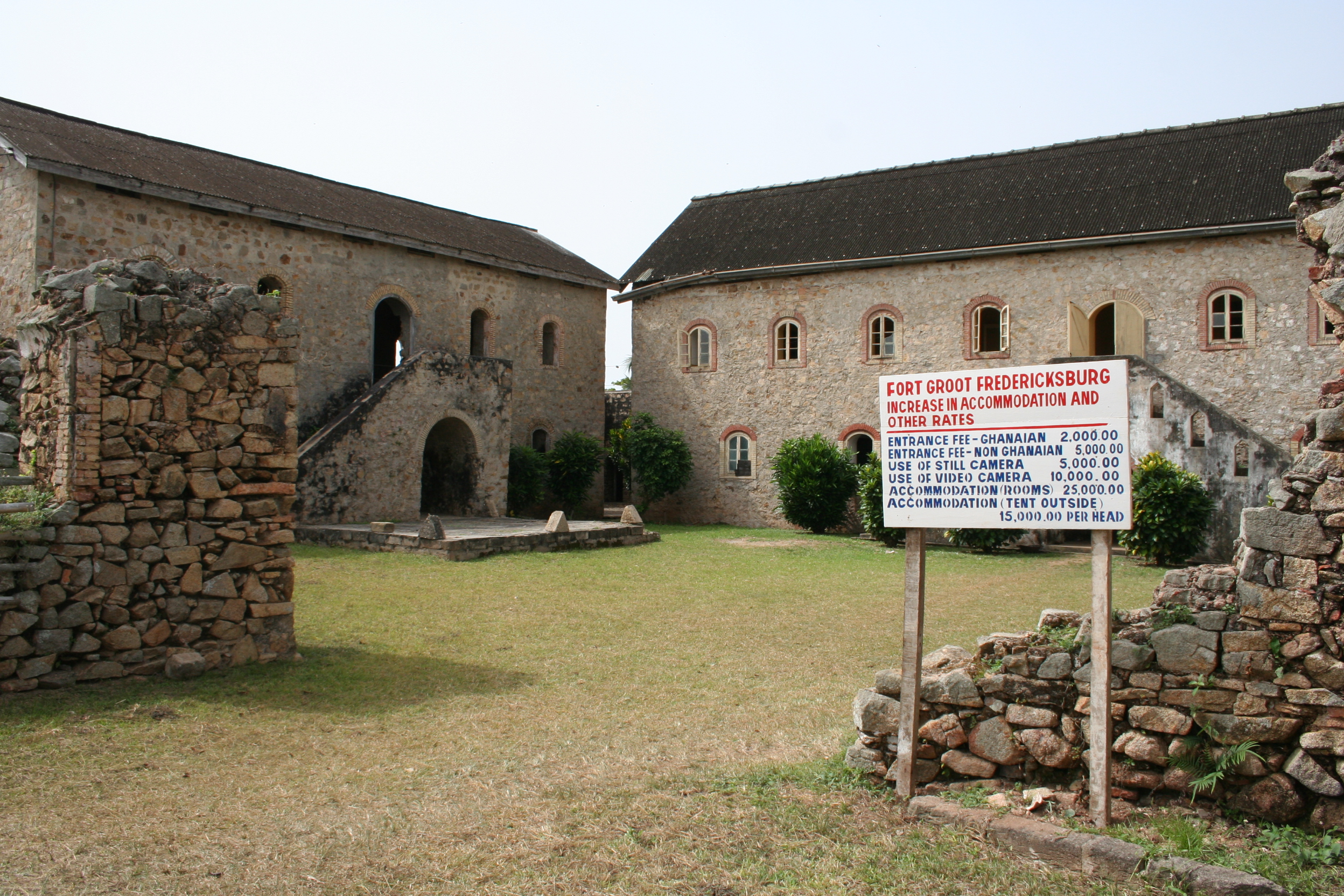
Forts Groot Friedrichsburg

Fort Fredericksburg was built of stone transported by sea between 1681 and 1683 from Prussia and is one of two German forts built in Ghana, the other being Fort Dorothea. It is estimated that some 300,000 Africans were transported through this fort. The remains of John Canoe are a mystery. Some have said he was captured after having lost the battle of the fort while others have said his remains are in the Tafo Cemetery in Kumasi. Because of its testimony to the Atlantic slave trade and the history of European colonial trade and exploitation, the fort was inscribed on the UNESCO World Heritage List in 1979 along with several other castles and forts in Ghana.

== Gallery ==
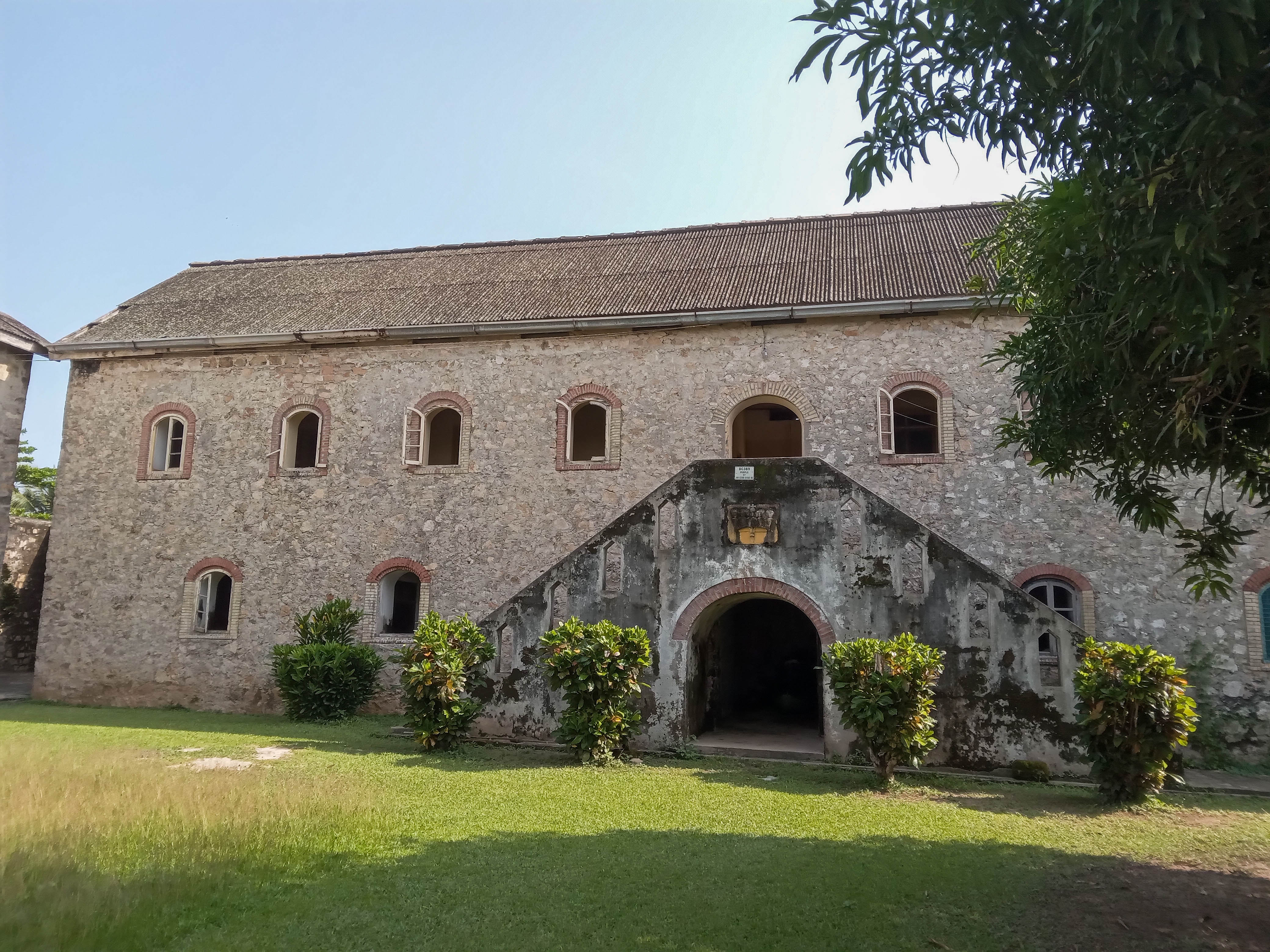
Fort Gross Fredericksburg at Princes town in the Western Region of Ghana

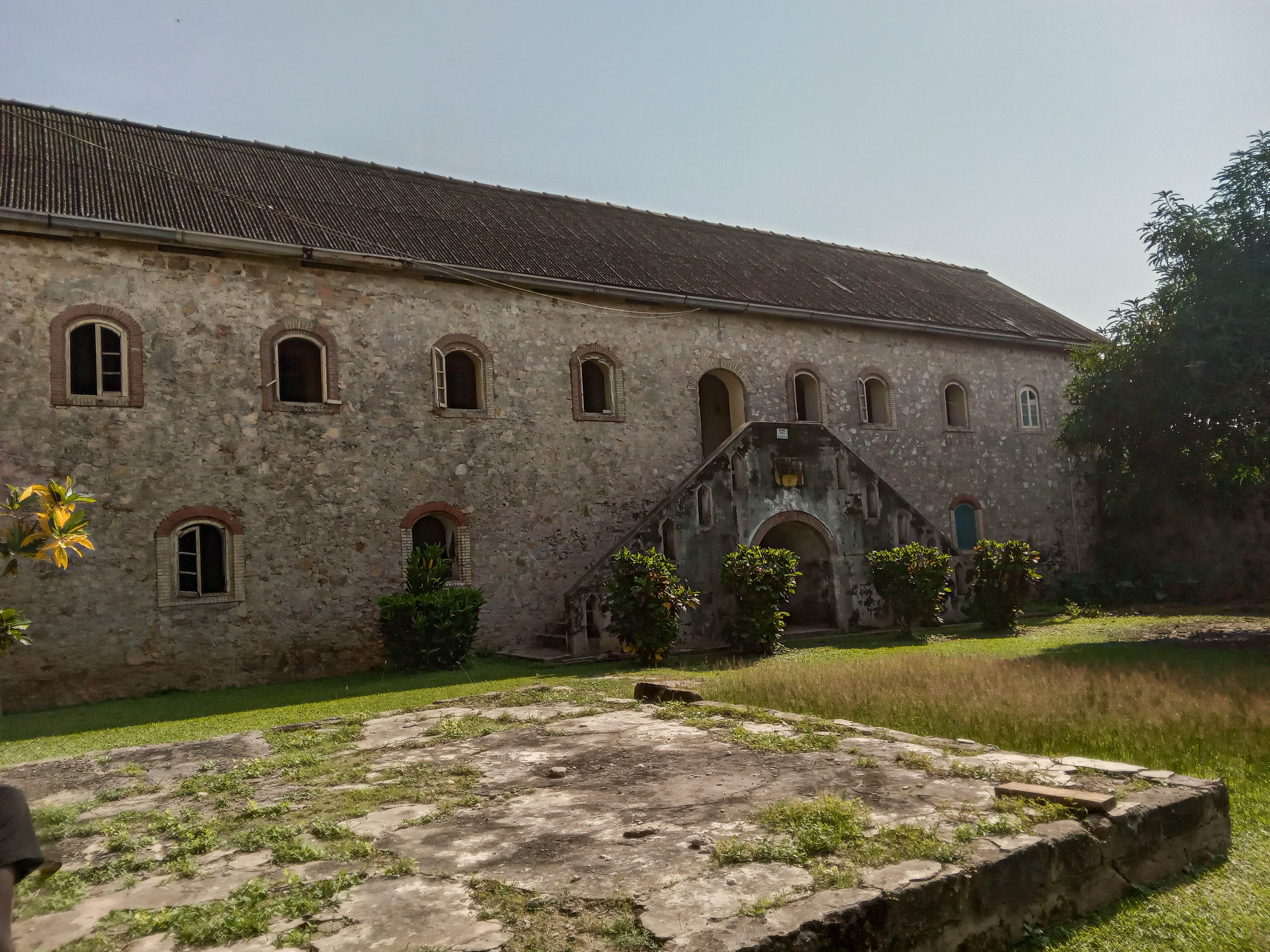
Fort Gross Fredericksburg at Princes town in the Western Region of Ghana

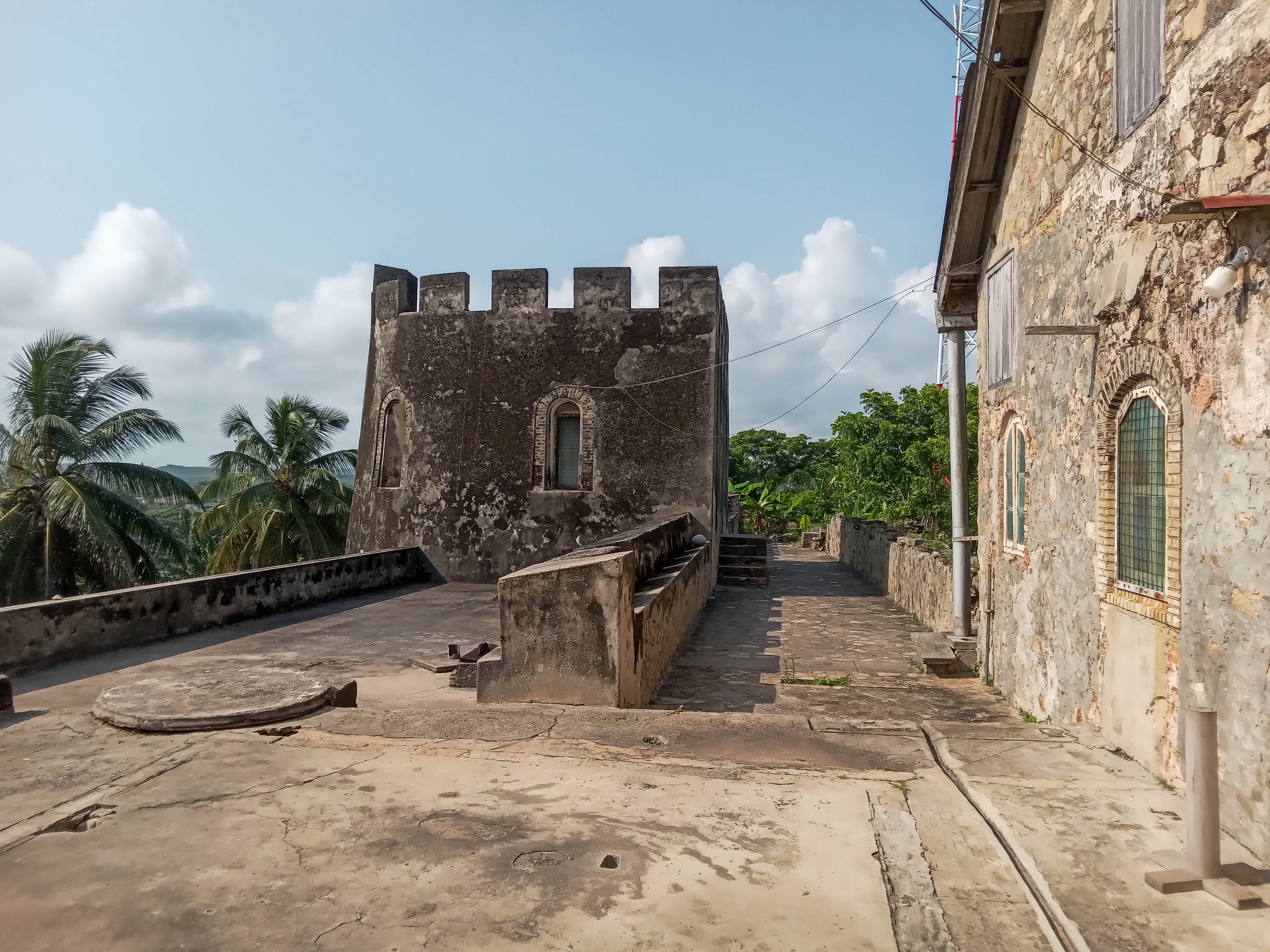
Fort Gross Fredericksburg at Princes town in the Western Region of Ghana

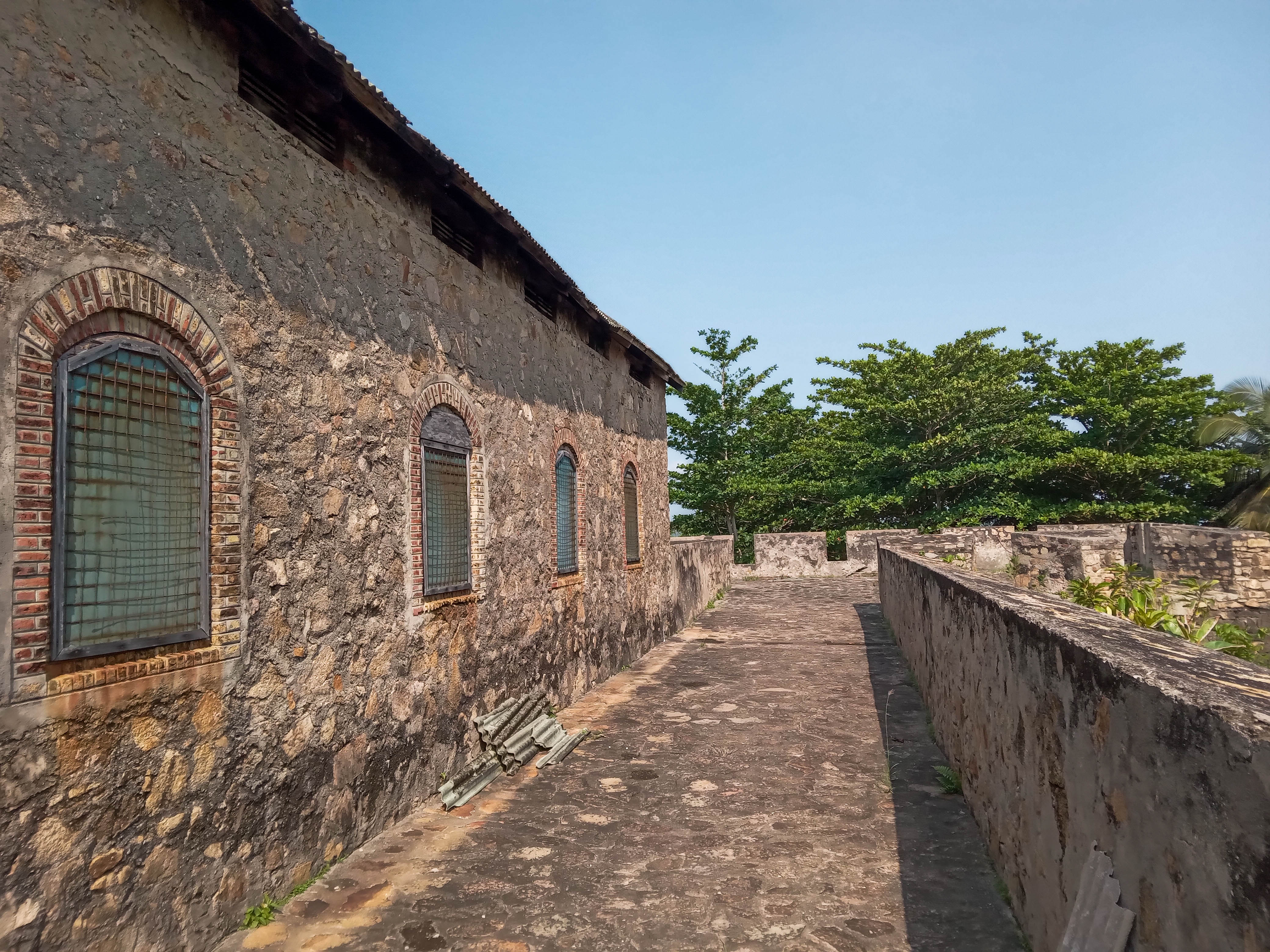
Fort Gross Fredericksburg at Princes town in the Western Region of Ghana

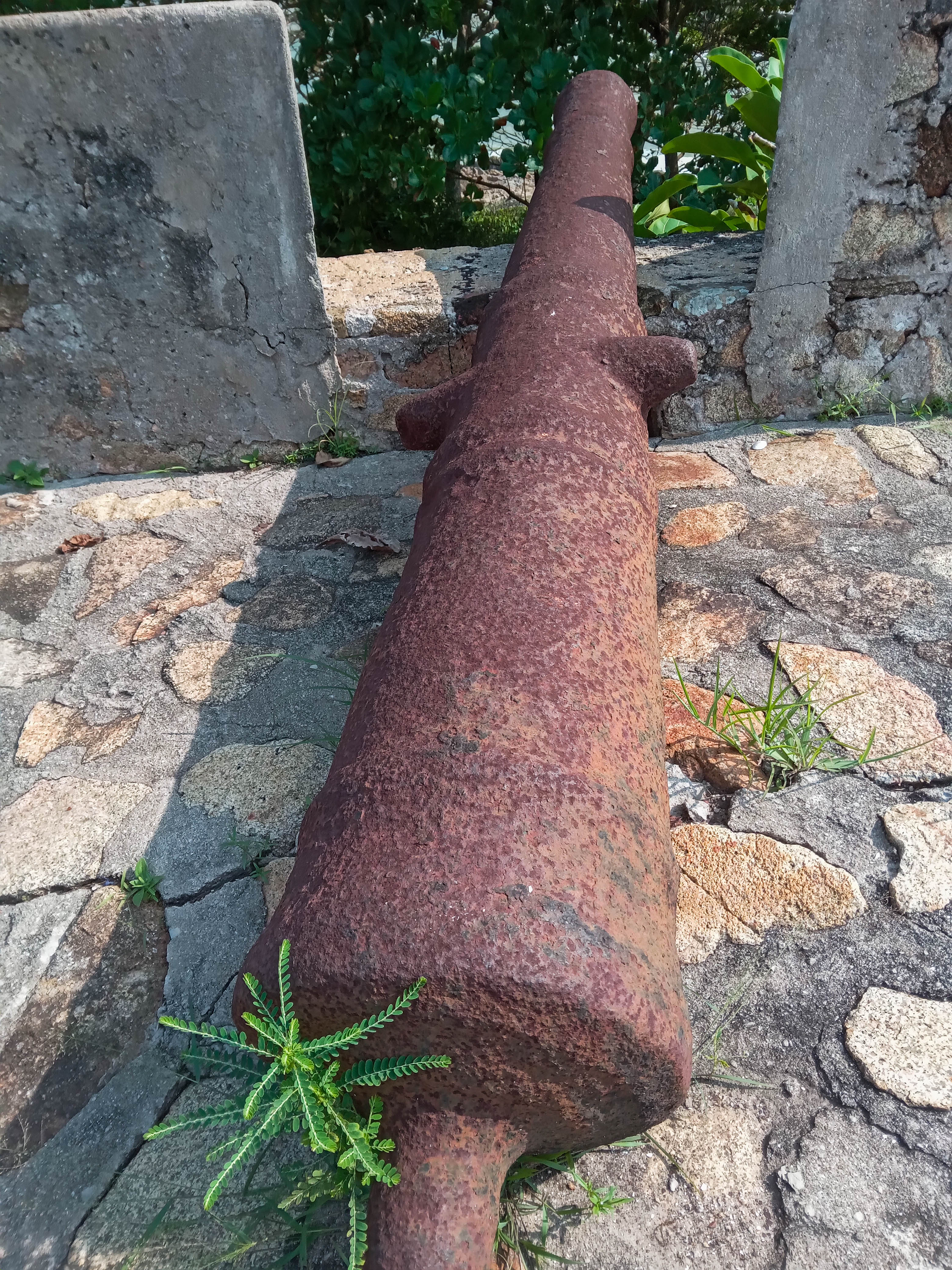
Cannon in Fort Gross Fredericksburg at Princes town in the Western Region of Ghana

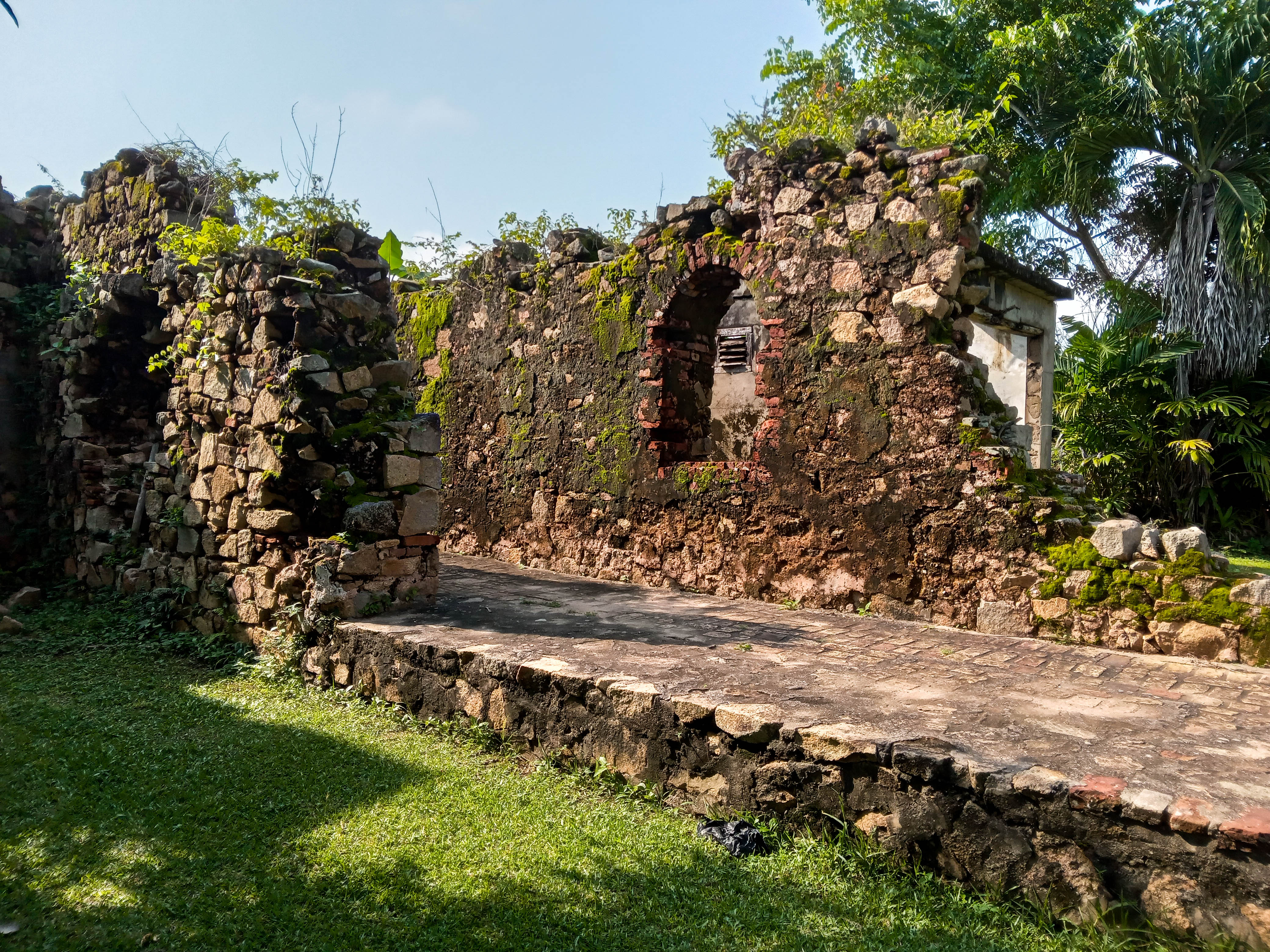
Part of the Fort Gross Fredericksburg at Princes town was damage as a result of battle in the fort.

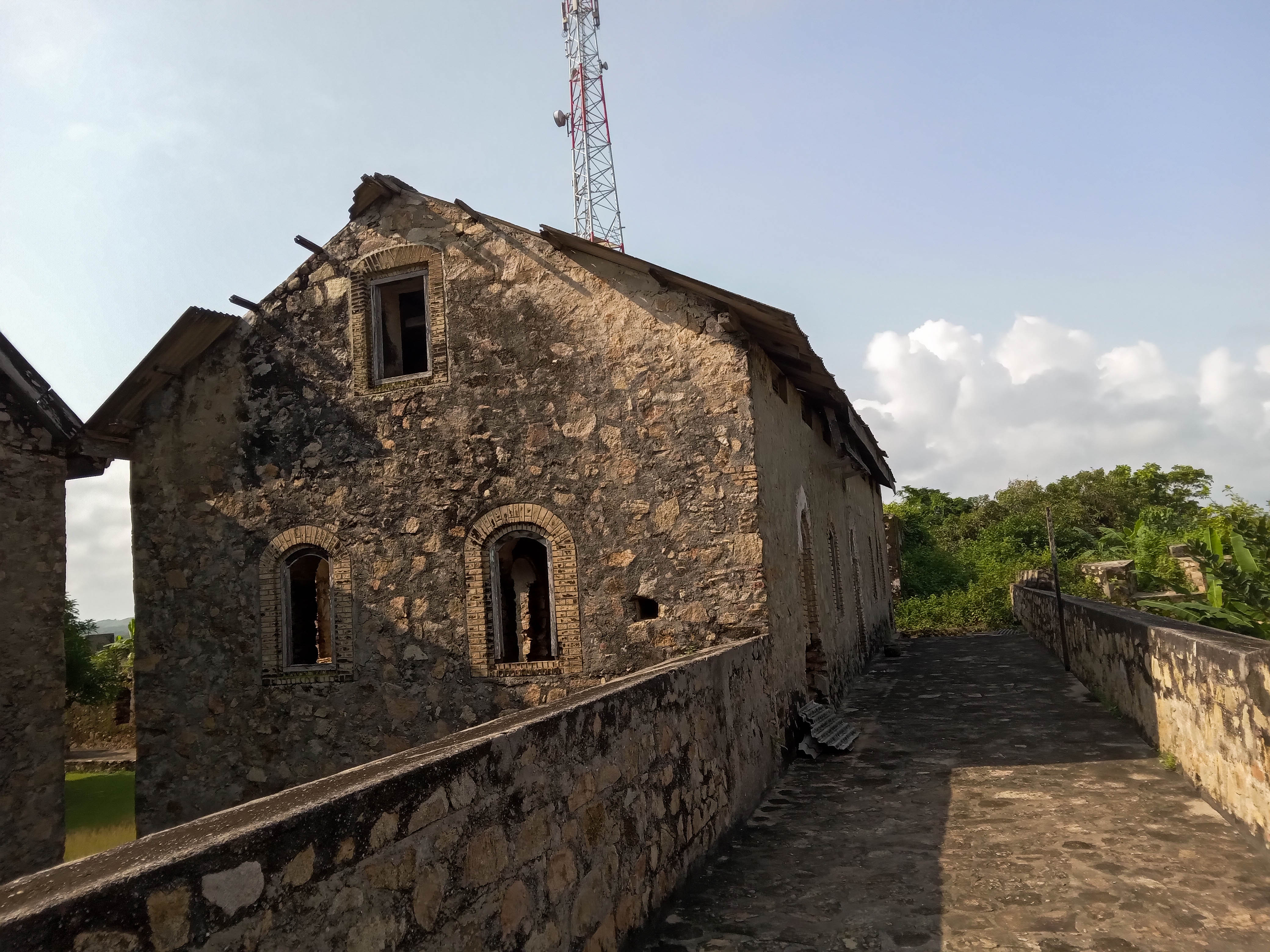
Fort Gross Fredericksburg at Princes town in the Western Region of Ghana

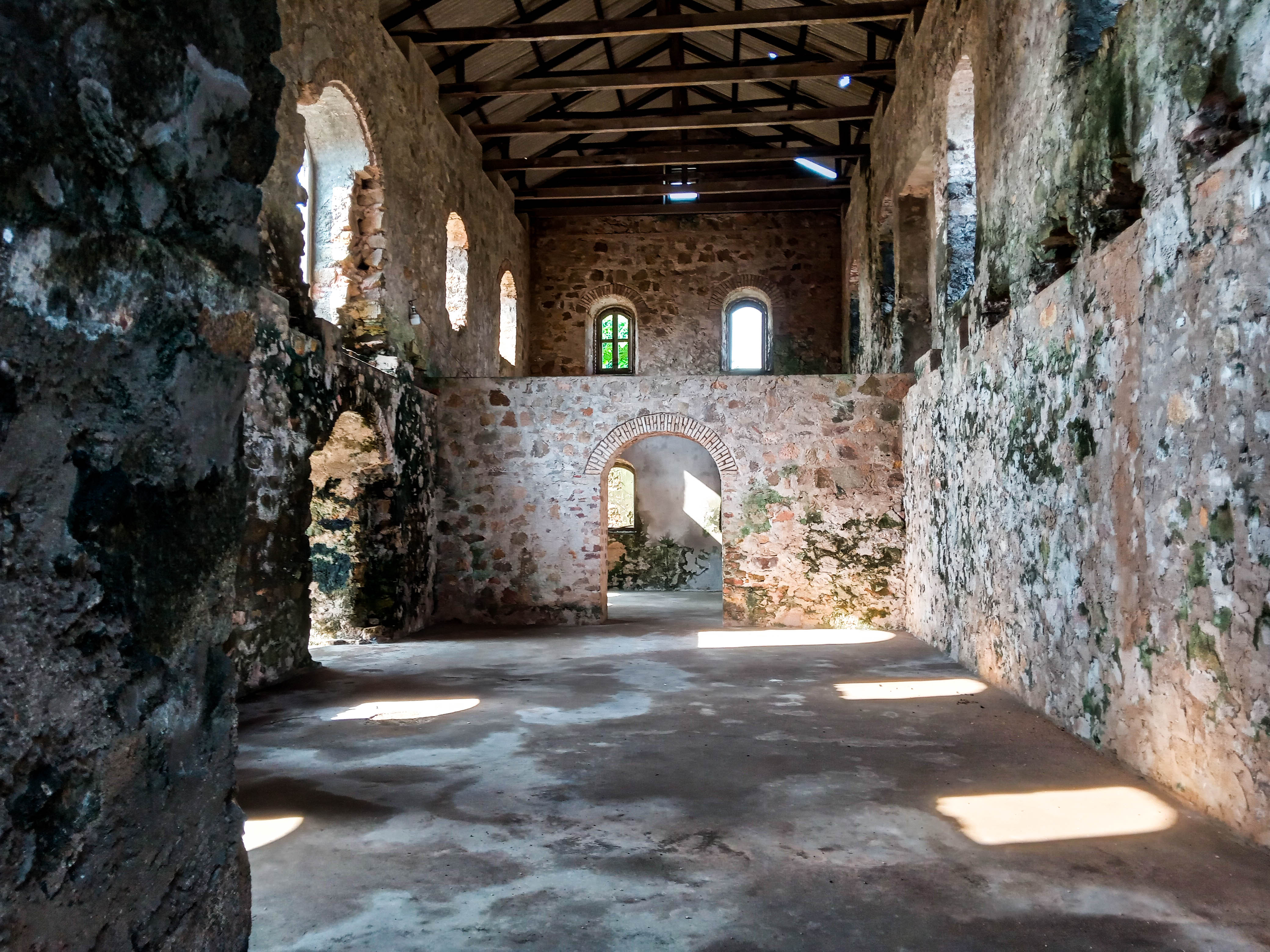
Fort Gross Fredericksburg at Princes town in the Western Region of Ghana

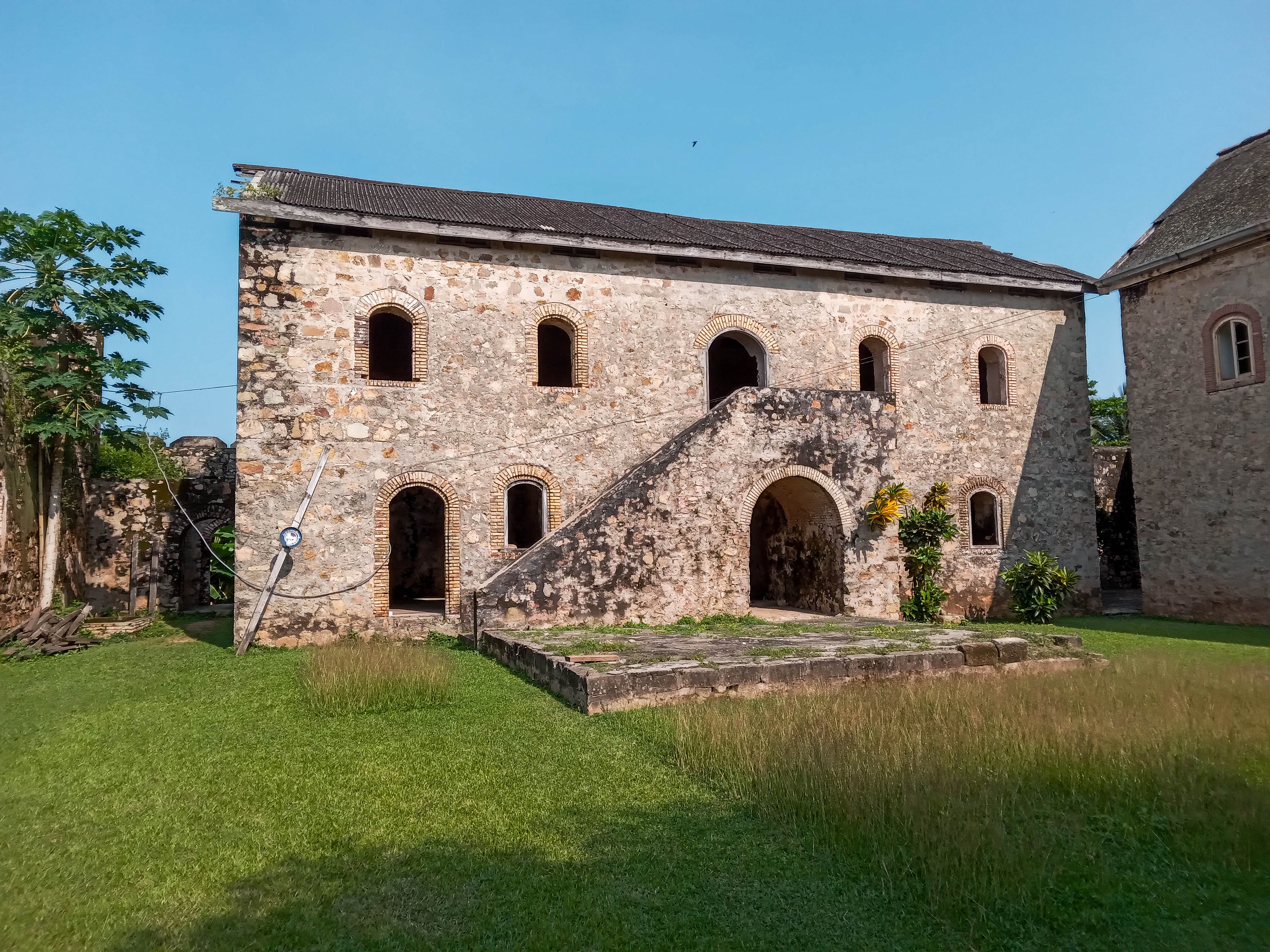
Fort Gross Fredericksburg at Princes town in the Western Region of Ghana

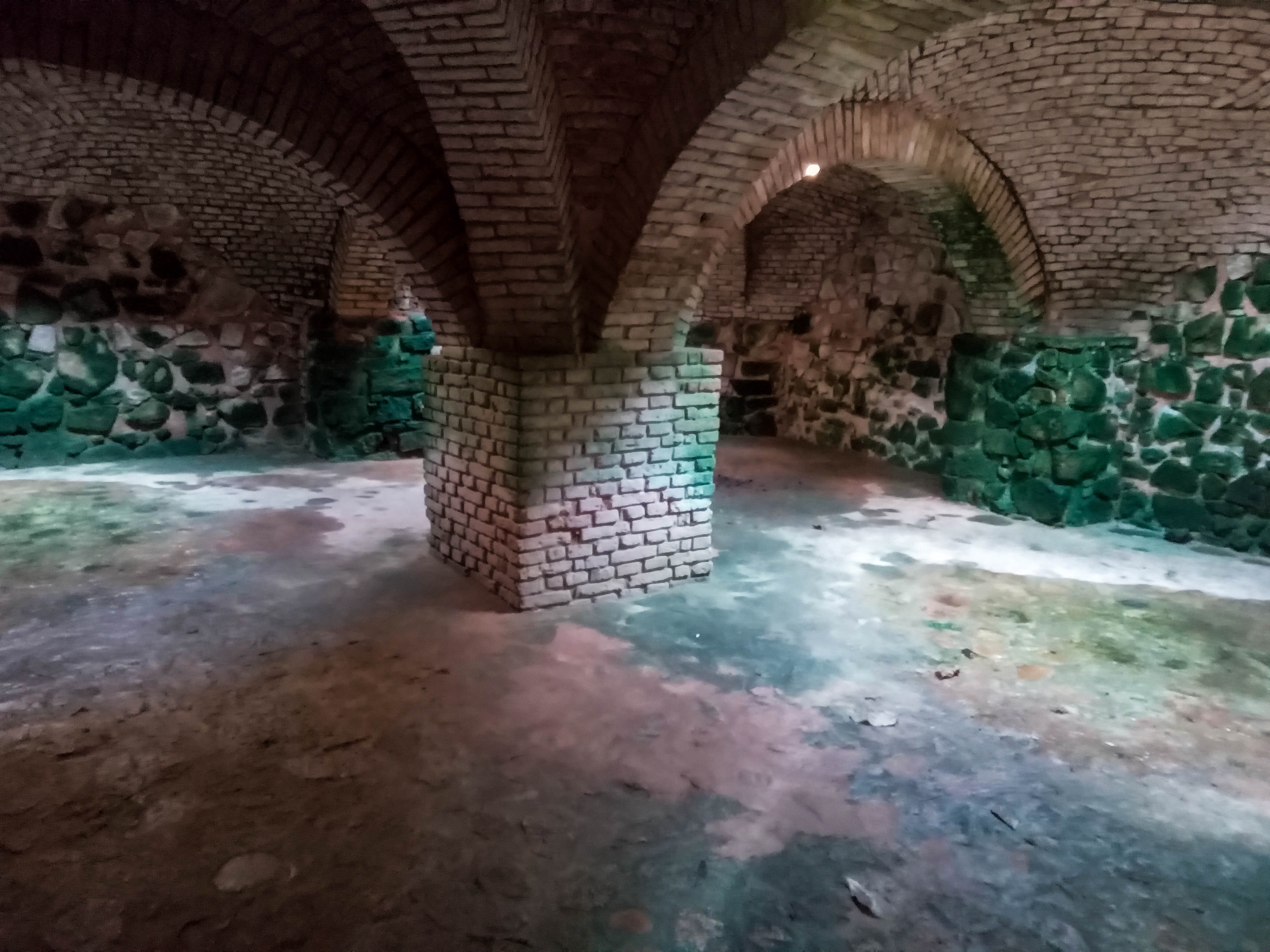
Fort Gross Fredericksburg at Princes town in the Western Region of Ghana

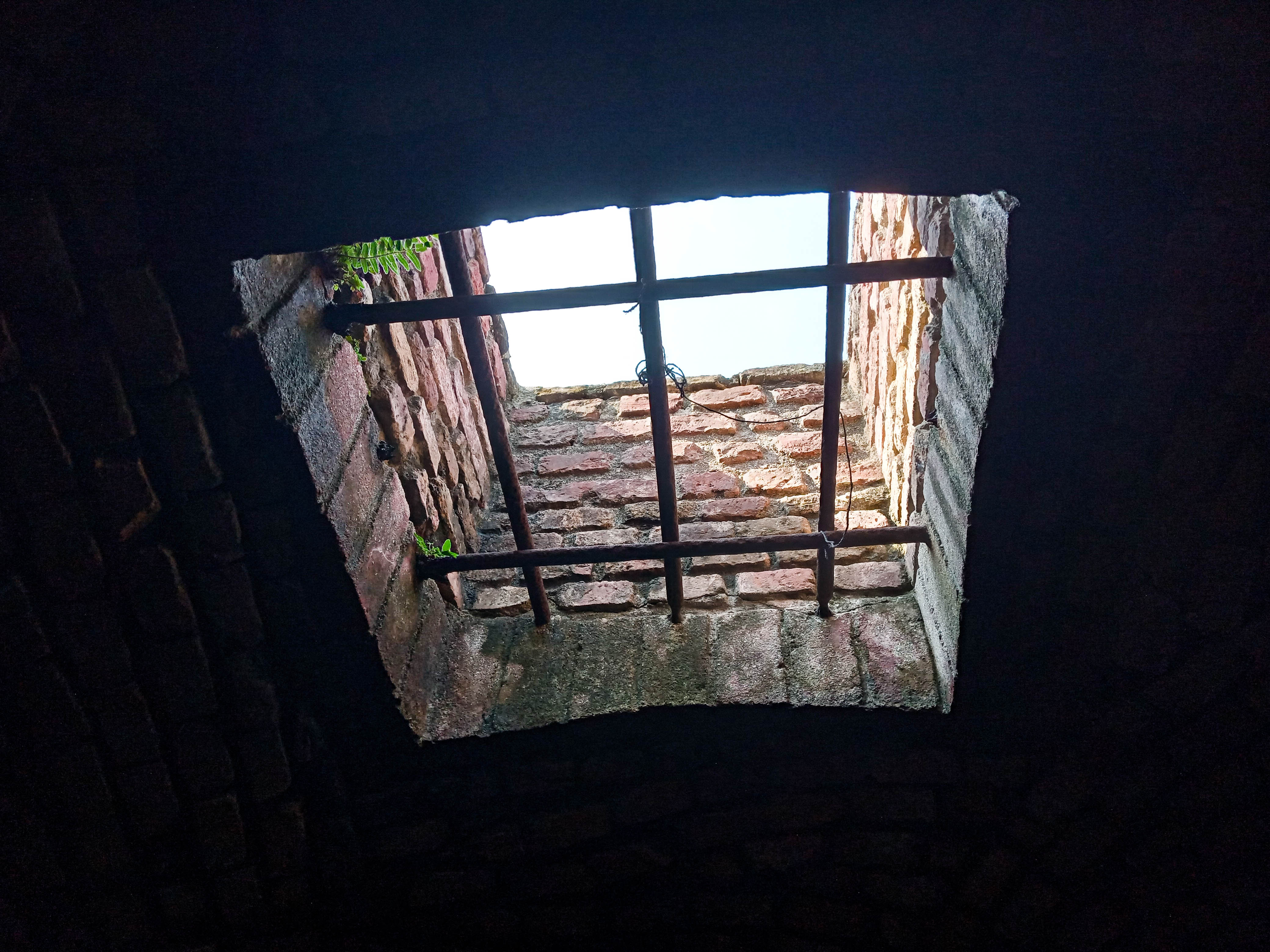
Top of prison cell at Fort Gross Fredericksburg at Princes town in the Western Region of Ghana

== Sister cities ==
List of sister cities of Princes Town, designated by Sister Cities International:

	Country	City	County / District / Region / State	Date
(United States)	USA	Fredericksburg, VA	Virginia	
