= Cape Three Points =

Peninsula forming the southernmost tip of Ghana

Coordinates: 4.744°N 2.089°W

Cape Three Points is a small peninsula and a fishing village in the Ahanta West Municipal, Western Region of Ghana on the Atlantic Ocean. It forms the southernmost tip of Ghana. The part of the town is near the Gulf of Guinea, and is known as a place for Ghana's Oil discovery.

== Location ==
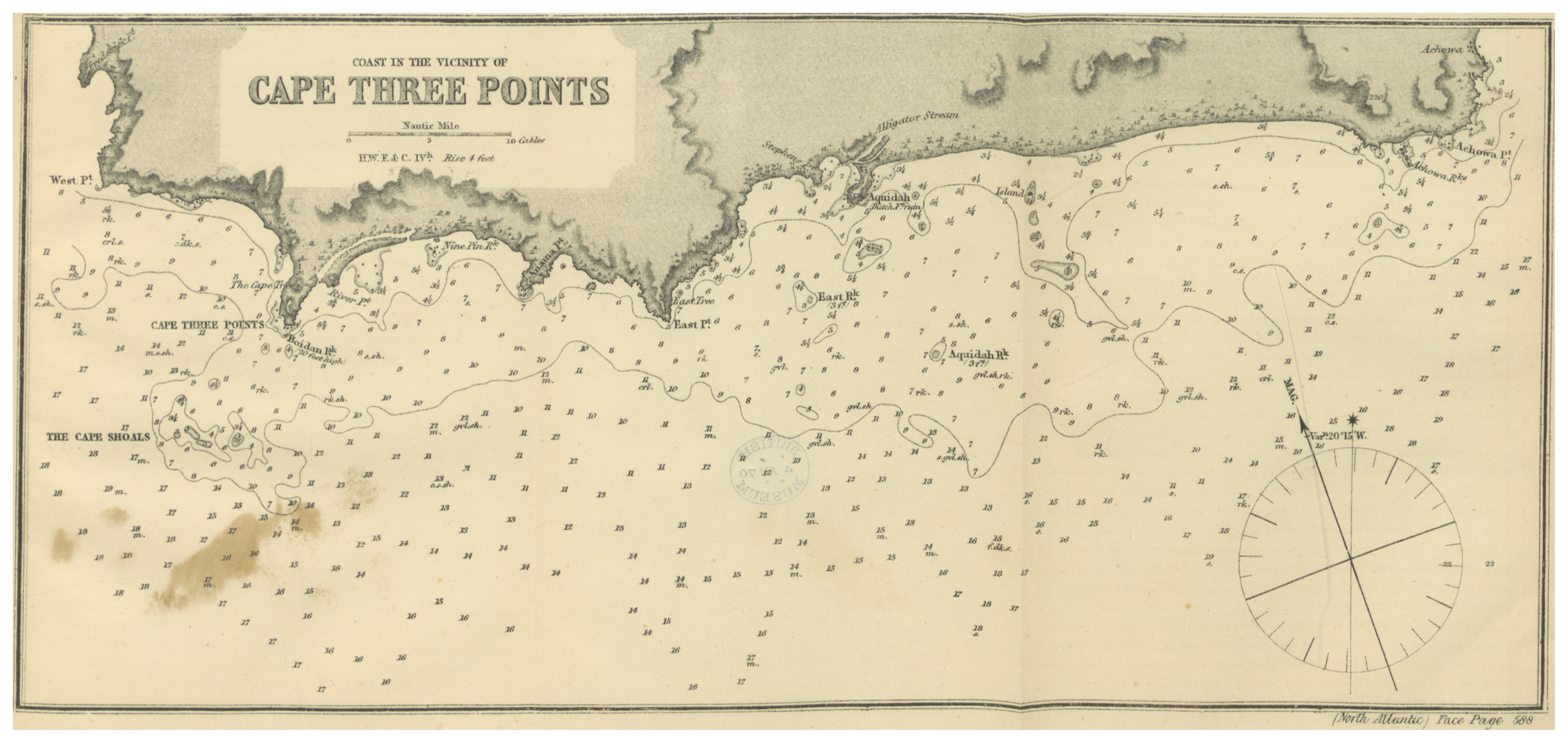
Nautical chart of Cape Three Points (1869)

Cape Three Points is located between the coastal village of Akwidaa and town of Princes Town, Ghana. Cape Three Points is known as the "land nearest nowhere" because it is the land nearest to a location in the sea known as Null Island, which is at 0 latitude and 0 longitude (the distance is about 570 km).

== Lighthouse ==
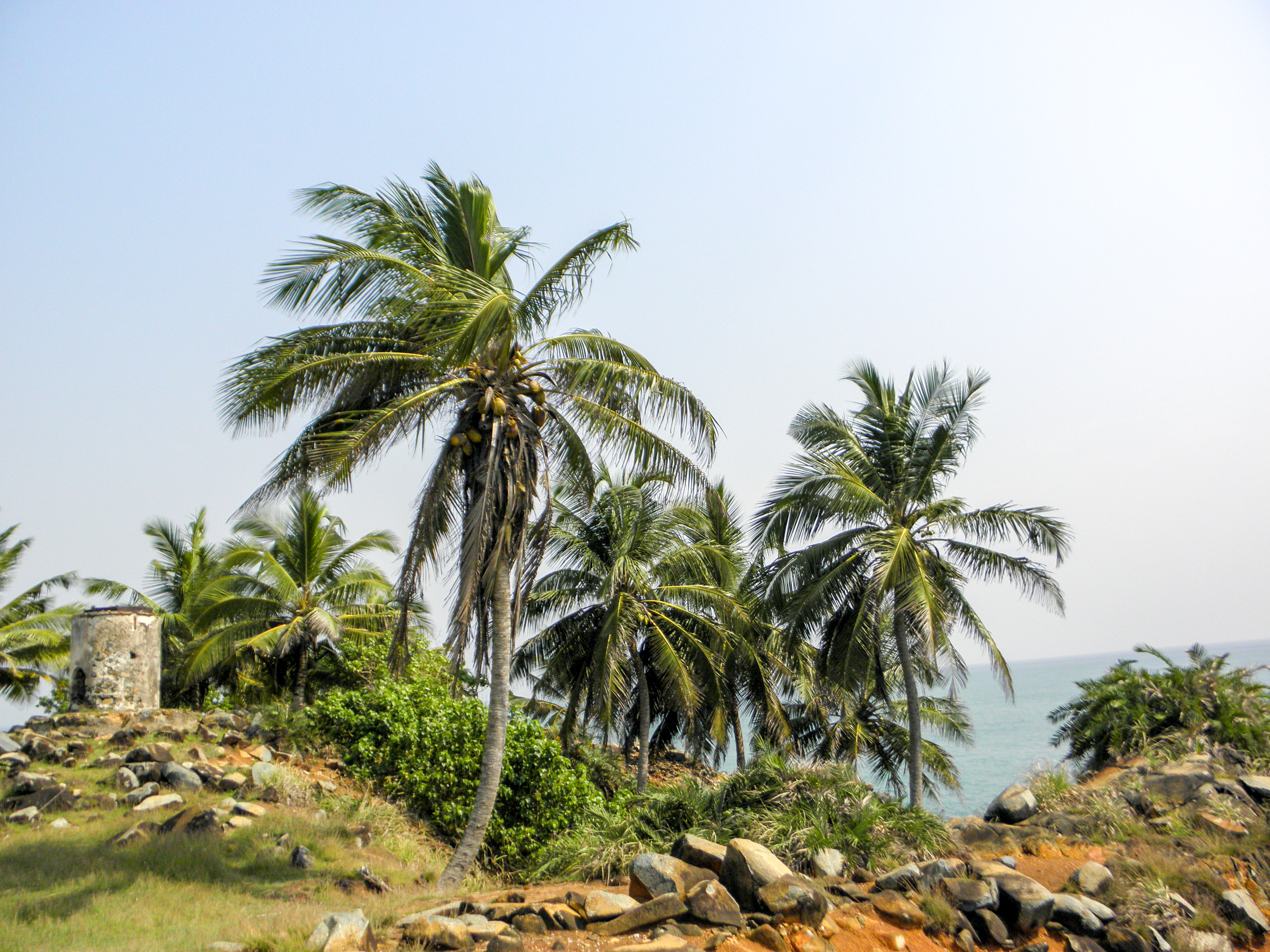
Cape Three Points and ruin of the old lighthouse.

Cape Three Points is best known for its lighthouses, the first of which was constructed in 1875 by the British as a navigational aid for trading vessels sailing through the Gulf of Guinea. The original structure has since become a ruin; however a larger and improved lighthouse was completed in 1925, and is still functioning today.
