= Shama Ahanta East Metropolitan District =

District in Western Region of Ghana

Shama-Ahanta East Metropolitan District
- Former Metropolitan District
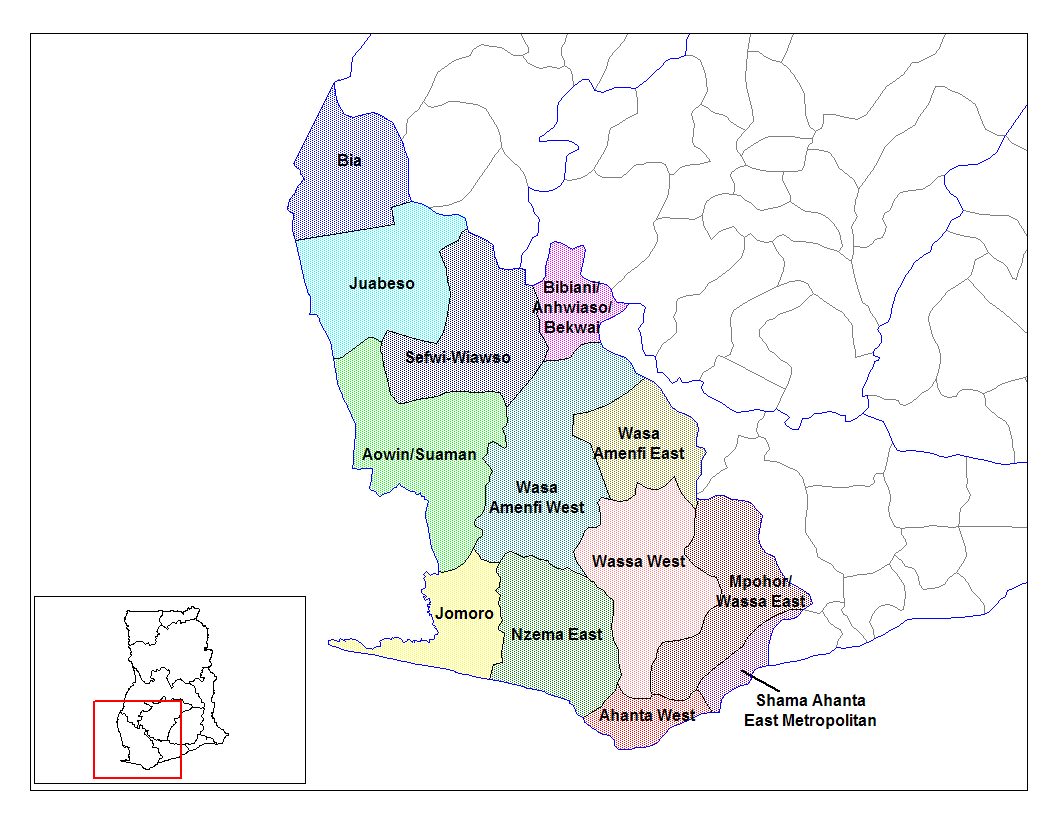
- Districts of Western Region

- Location of Shama-Ahanta East Metropolitan District within Western
- Coordinates: 4°55′12″N 1°44′24″W
- Country: Ghana
- Region: Western
- Capital: Sekondi-Takoradi

Government
  - Metropolitan Chief Executive: Kwesi Nkrumah

Area
  - Total: 384 km^{2} (148 sq mi)

Population (2002)
  - Total: 366,579
- Time zone: UTC+0 (GMT)
- ISO 3166 code: GH-WP-SA

Shama Ahanta East Metropolitan District is a former district that was located in Western Region, Ghana. Originally created as a metropolitan district assembly in 1988 when it was known as Sekondi Takoradi Metropolitan Authority Council; which was later renamed as Shama Ahanta East Metropolitan District in 1994. However, on 29 February 2008, it was split off into two new districts: Sekondi Takoradi Metropolitan District (capital: Sekondi-Takoradi) and Shama District (capital: Shama). The metropolis was located in the southeast part of Western Region and had Sekondi-Takoradi as its capital town.

== Sources ==
- "Districts of Ghana". Statoids.
- GhanaDistricts.com
