= Sekondi Takoradi Metropolitan Assembly =

District in Western Region of Ghana

Sekondi-Takoradi Metropolitan Assembly
- Metropolitan District
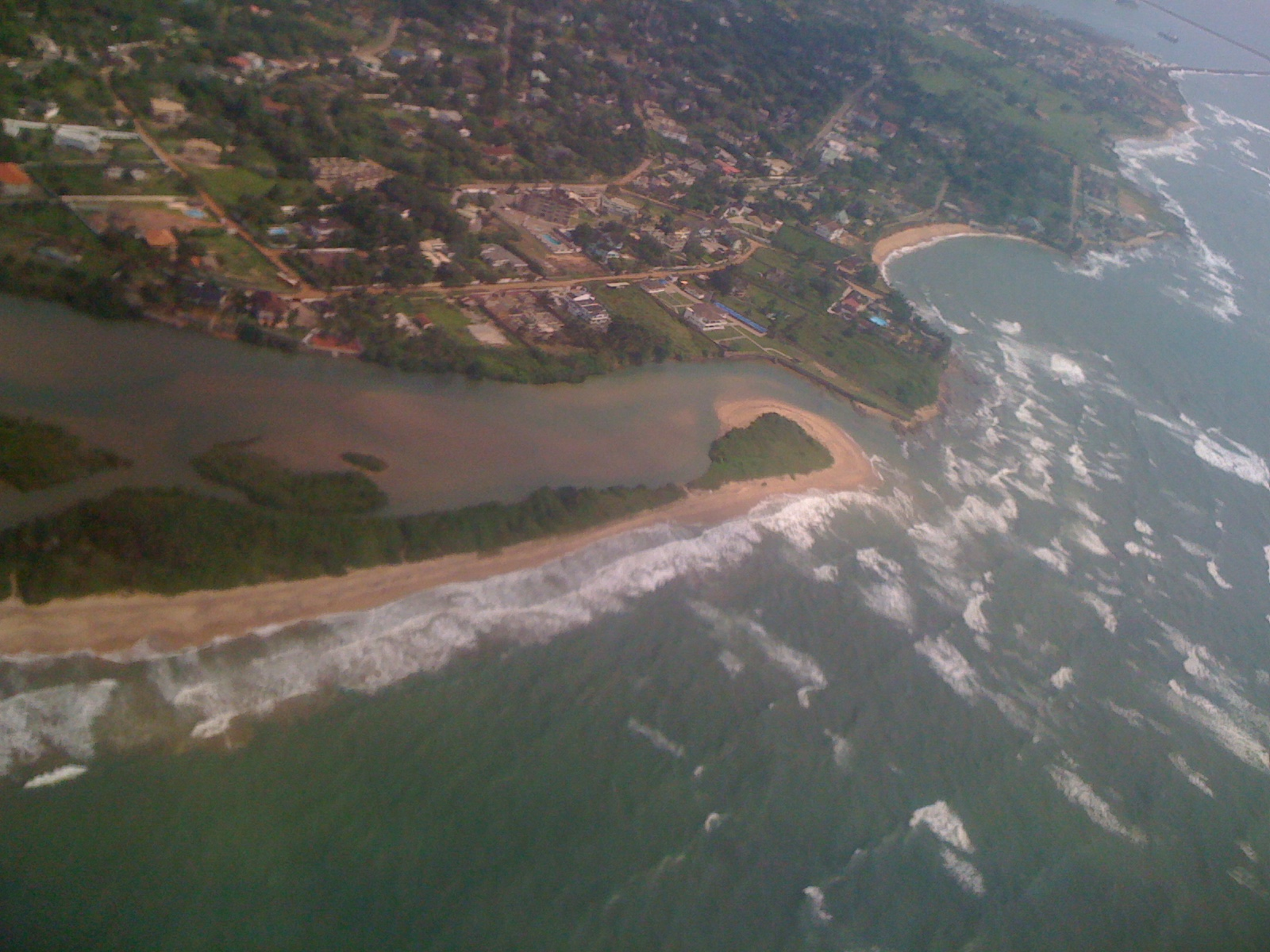
- View of Virgin Island in Sekondi-Takoradi

- Seal

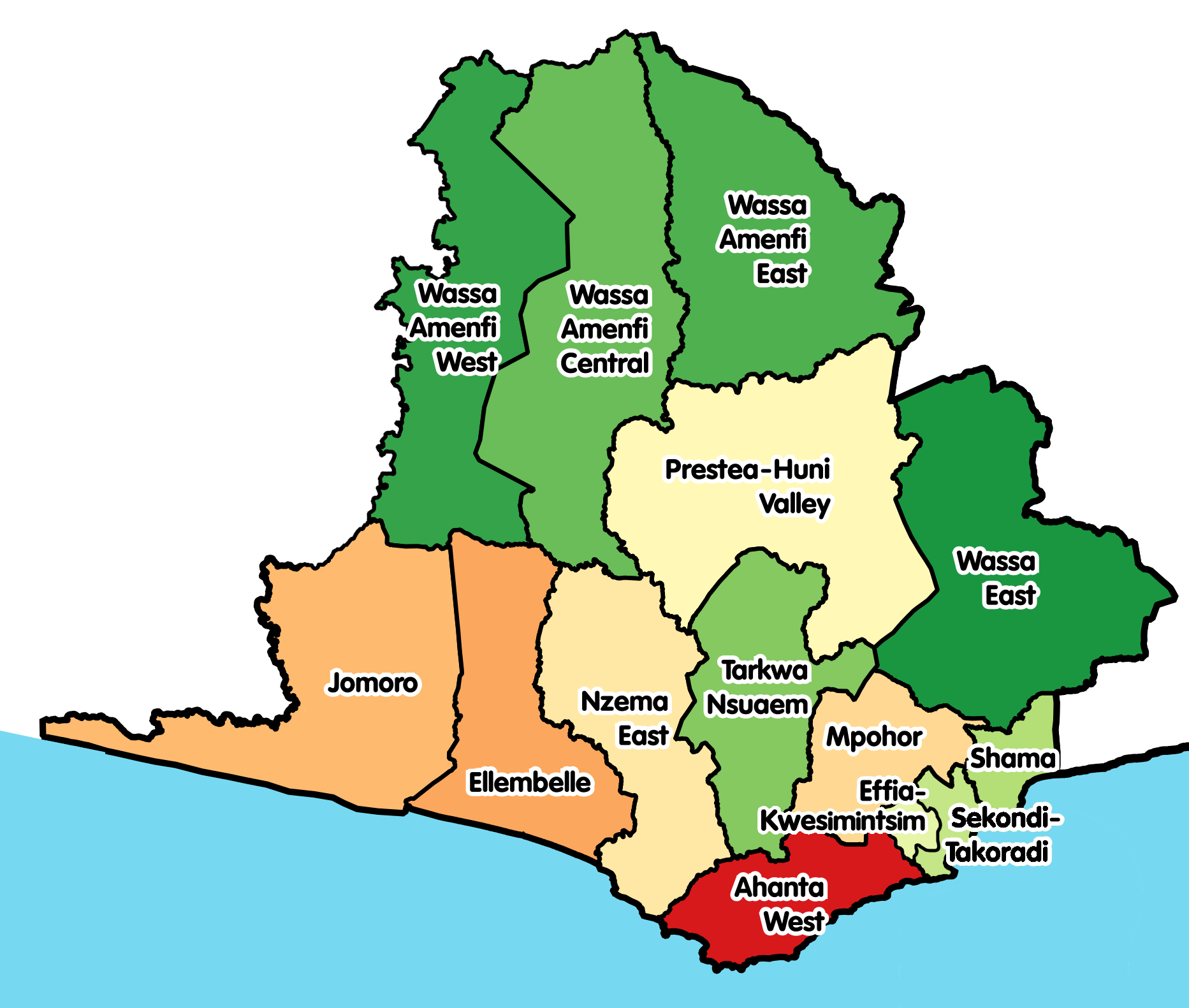
- Districts of Western Region

- Location of Sekondi-Takoradi Metropolitan Assembly within Western
- Coordinates: 4°55′12″N 1°44′24″W
- Country: Ghana
- Region: Western
- Capital: Sekondi-Takoradi

Government
  - Metropolitan Chief Executive: Captain Anthony R. Cudjoe

Area
  - Total: 66.44 km^{2} (25.65 sq mi)

Population (2021)
  - Total: 245,382
  - Density: 3,693/km^{2} (9,566/sq mi)
- Time zone: UTC+0 (GMT)
- ISO 3166 code: GH-WP-ST

Sekondi Takoradi Metropolitan Assembly is one of the fourteen districts in Western Region, Ghana. It was formerly part of the then-larger Shama Ahanta East Metropolitan District in 1988, which was created from the former Sekondi Takoradi Metropolitan Authority Council, until the eastern part of the district was split off to create Shama District on 29 February 2008. The remaining part has been renamed as Sekondi Takoradi Metropolitan District. On 15 March 2018, the western part of the district was split off to become Effia Kwesimintsim Municipal District; thus, the remaining part has been retained as Sekondi Takoradi Metropolitan District. The metropolis is located in the southeast part of Western Region and has Sekondi-Takoradi as its capital town.

The Sekondi Takoradi Metropolitan District has a Political and Administrative structure. The Political Structure is composed of the General Assembly of fifty-seven (57) members, comprising thirty-six (36) elected members and Seventeen (17) appointed members, the Metropolitan Chief Executive and three (3) Members of Parliament as members of the Assembly.

== List of settlements ==
Settlements of Sekondi Takoradi Metropolitan Assembly
No.	Settlement	Population	Population year
1	Sekondi	144,570	2012
2	Takoradi	260,635	2012
3	Sekondi-Takoradi	405,205	2012

== Sources ==
- "Districts of Ghana". Statoids.
- GhanaDistricts.com
