= Akwidaa =

Town in Western Region, Ghana

Akwidaa: Akwidaa New Town; Akwidaa Old Town
- Town
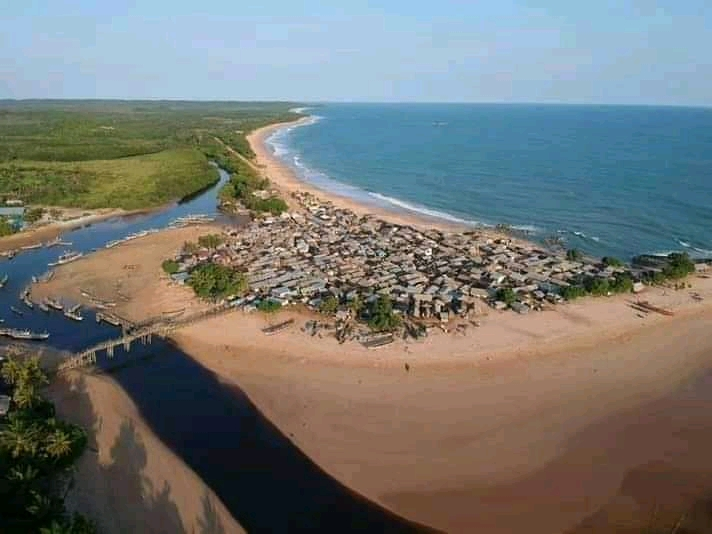
- View of Akwidaa and the Gulf of Guinea

- Location of Akwidaa in Western Region, Ghana
- Coordinates: 4°45′N 2°1′W
- Country: Ghana
- Region: Western Region
- District: Ahanta West District

Population
  - Demonym: Akwidan
- Time zone: UTC+0 (Greenwich Mean Time)
  - Summer (DST): GMT
- postal code: WH

Akwidaa is a small town and fishing village in Ahanta West district, Western Region of Ghana. It is one of the southernmost places in Ghana.

The part of town near the Gulf of Guinea, known as Akiwidaa Old Town, suffers from flooding and erosion as a result of climate change. This is due to its location in a low-lying area adjacent to a wetland and river mouth. This resulted in most of the residents evacuating inland, which would become Akiwidaa New Town.

== Etymology ==
Akwidaa is a Twi word meaning 'old man'. It is believe to be named after a man who transported people over the Ezile River during Dutch colonial times. The town was originally named after the river.

== History ==
The town has been settled for centuries by the Ahanta people.

=== Fort Dorothea ===
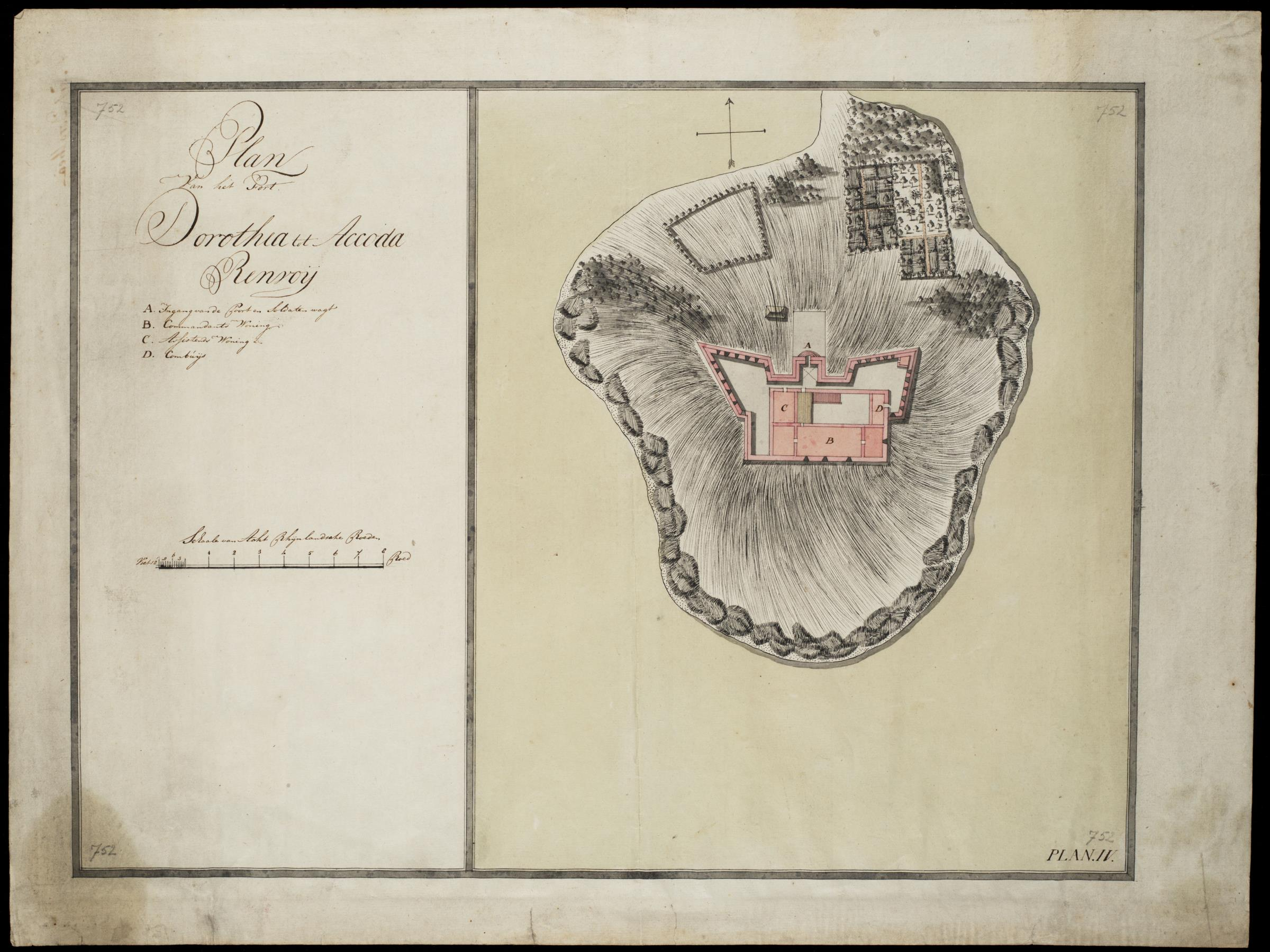
Plan of Fort Dorothea (1786)

In the late 17th and early 18th Century, Akwidaa, then known as Fort Dorothea, was the smaller of the two forts which constituted a German colony, the Brandenburger Gold Coast. After being captured by the Dutch, they occupied the fort from 1687 to 1698 from whom the Brandenburgers sold it in 1718. The ruins of the fort were inscribed on the UNESCO World Heritage List in 1979 along with other forts in the region.

== Economy ==
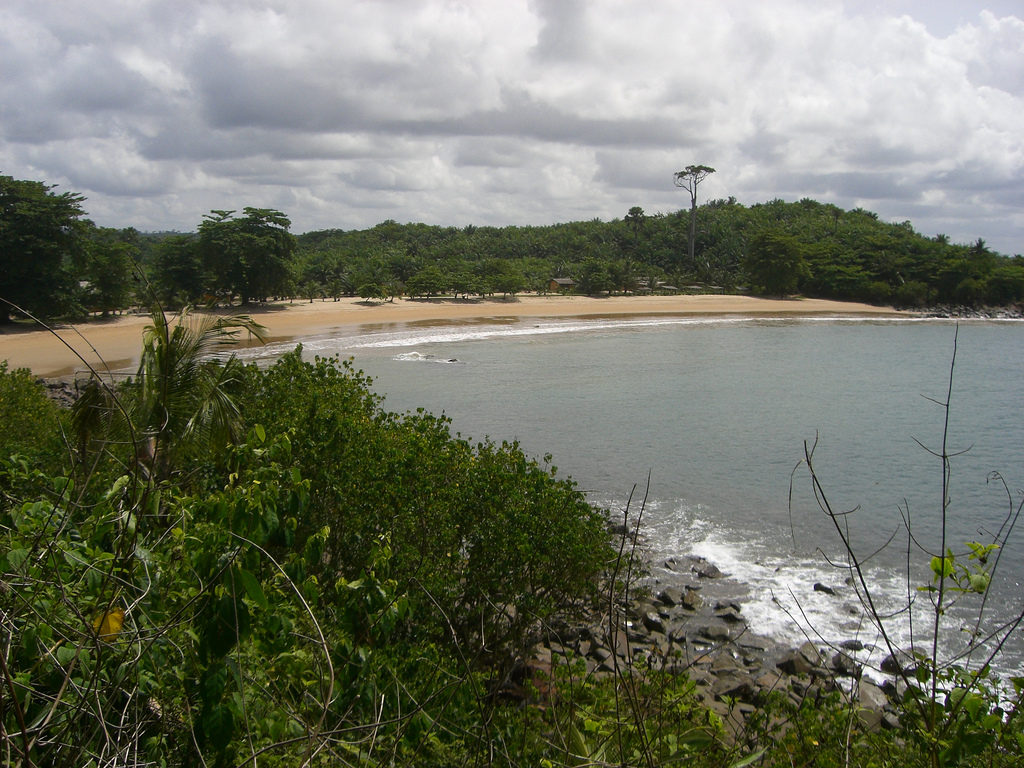
View of Ezile Bay Beach in Akwidaa

The economy is primarily based upon fishing, with many fishing boats lining the shoreline. Agriculture is also a major sector in the town. It is a tourist spot in the region, being the location of many popular beaches.

With the discovery of oil in the district, Akwidaa have been a point of interest for investment.

== Beaches ==
- Ezile-Bay Ecolodge
- Akwidaa Inn
- Safari beach

== See also ==
- Princes Town, Ghana
- Cape Three Points
