= Sekondi Takoradi Metropolitan Authority =

Former district council in Western Region of Ghana

Sekondi-Takoradi Metropolitan Authority
- Former District Council
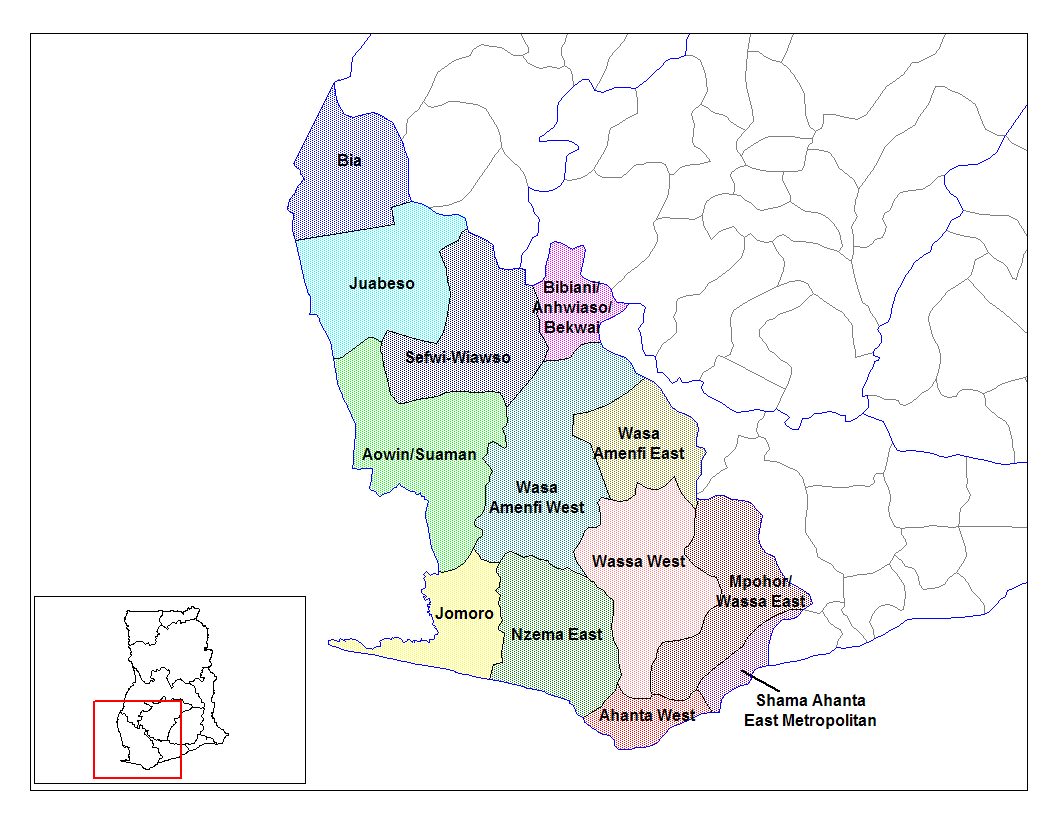
- Districts of Western Region

- Location of Sekondi-Takoradi Metropolitan Authority within Western
- Coordinates: 4°55′12″N 1°44′24″W
- Country: Ghana
- Region: Western
- Capital: Sekondi-Takoradi
- Time zone: UTC+0 (GMT)
- ISO 3166 code: GH-WP-ST

Sekondi-Takoradi Metropolitan Authority is a former district council that was located in Western Region, Ghana. Originally created as a district council in 1975. However, on 1988, it was split off into two new district assemblies: Shama Ahanta East Metropolitan District (capital: Sekondi-Takoradi) and Ahanta West District (capital: Agona Nkwanta). The district council was located in the southeast part of Western Region and had Sekondi-Takoradi as its capital town.
