= Ahanta West Municipal District =

District in Western Region of Ghana

- Municipal district
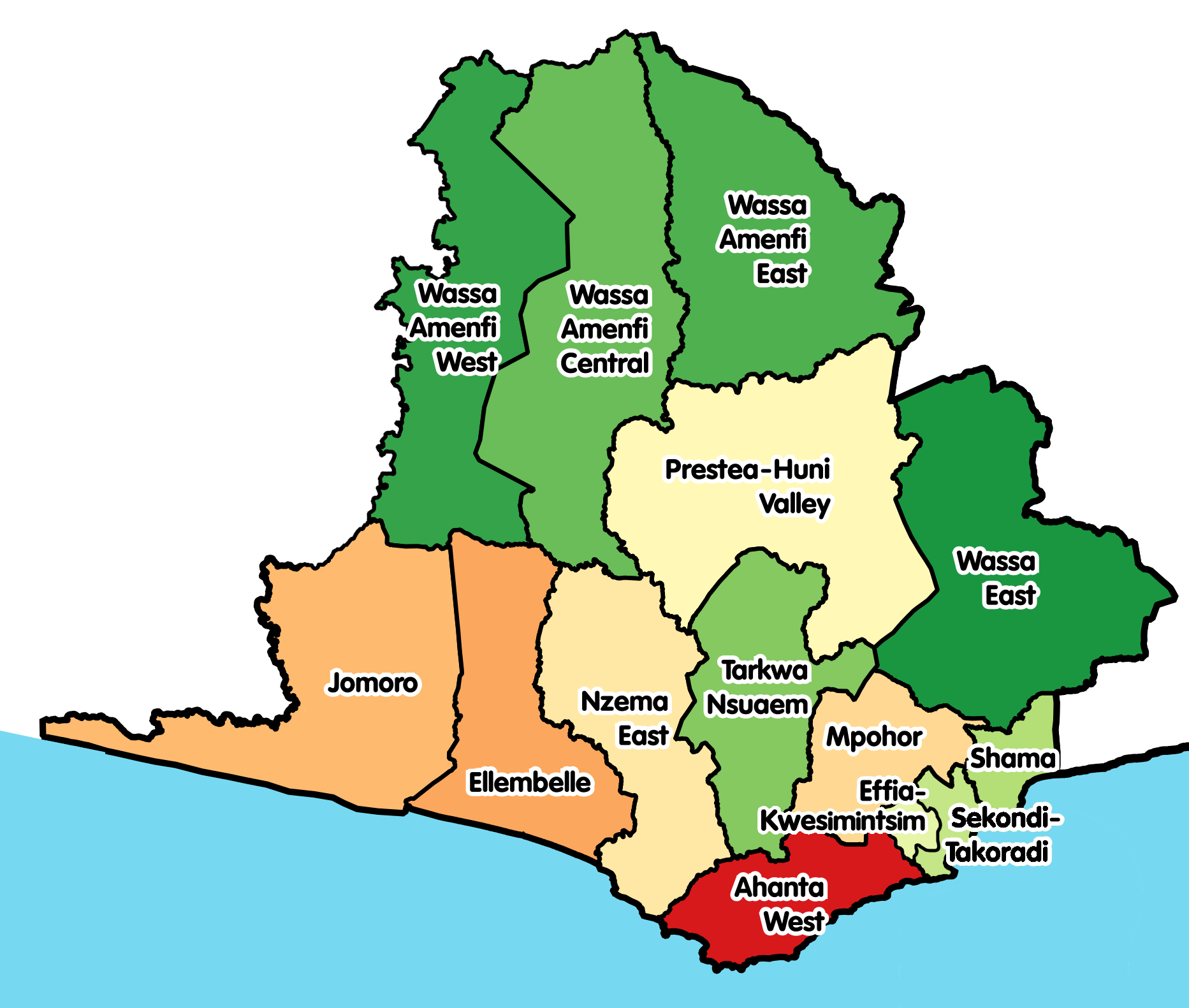
- Districts of Western Region

- Location of Ahanta West Municipal District within Western
- Coordinates: 4°52′55.2″N 1°58′8.4″W
- Country: Ghana
- Region: Western
- Capital: Agona Nkwanta

Government
  - Municipal Chief Executive: Henrietta Mary Eyison

Area
  - Total: 636 km^{2} (246 sq mi)

Population (2021 census)
  - Total: 153,140
  - Density: 241/km^{2} (624/sq mi)
- Time zone: UTC+0 (GMT)
- ISO 3166 code: GH-WP-AW

Ahanta West Municipal District is one of the fourteen districts in Western Region, Ghana. It was originally Ahanta West District, a district assembly created from the former Sekondi Takoradi Metropolitan Authority Council in 1998. It was elevated to municipal district assembly status on 15 March 2018 to become Ahanta West Municipal District. The municipality is located in the southeast part of Western Region, and has Agona Nkwanta as its capital town.

Geographically, it is the closest land region to Null Island (0°N 0°E).

== Sources ==
- "Districts of Ghana". Statoids.
- GhanaDistricts.com
