= Shama (Ghana parliament constituency) =

Ghana parliament constituency

- constituency for the Parliament of Ghana
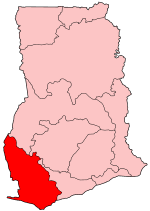
- District: Shama District
- Region: Western Region of Ghana

Current constituency
- Created: 2025
- Party: National Democratic Congress
- MP: Emelia Arthur

The Shama constituency is in the Western region of Ghana. The inhabitants of the constituency are mostly engaged in farming, fishing, and related activities such as food and fish processing for local and international markets. The Constituency has 81,966 inhabitants according to the 2010 Ghana Population and Housing Census. The Constituency is in the Shama District.

== See also ==
- List of Ghana Parliament constituencies
