= Shama District =

District in Western Region of Ghana

- District
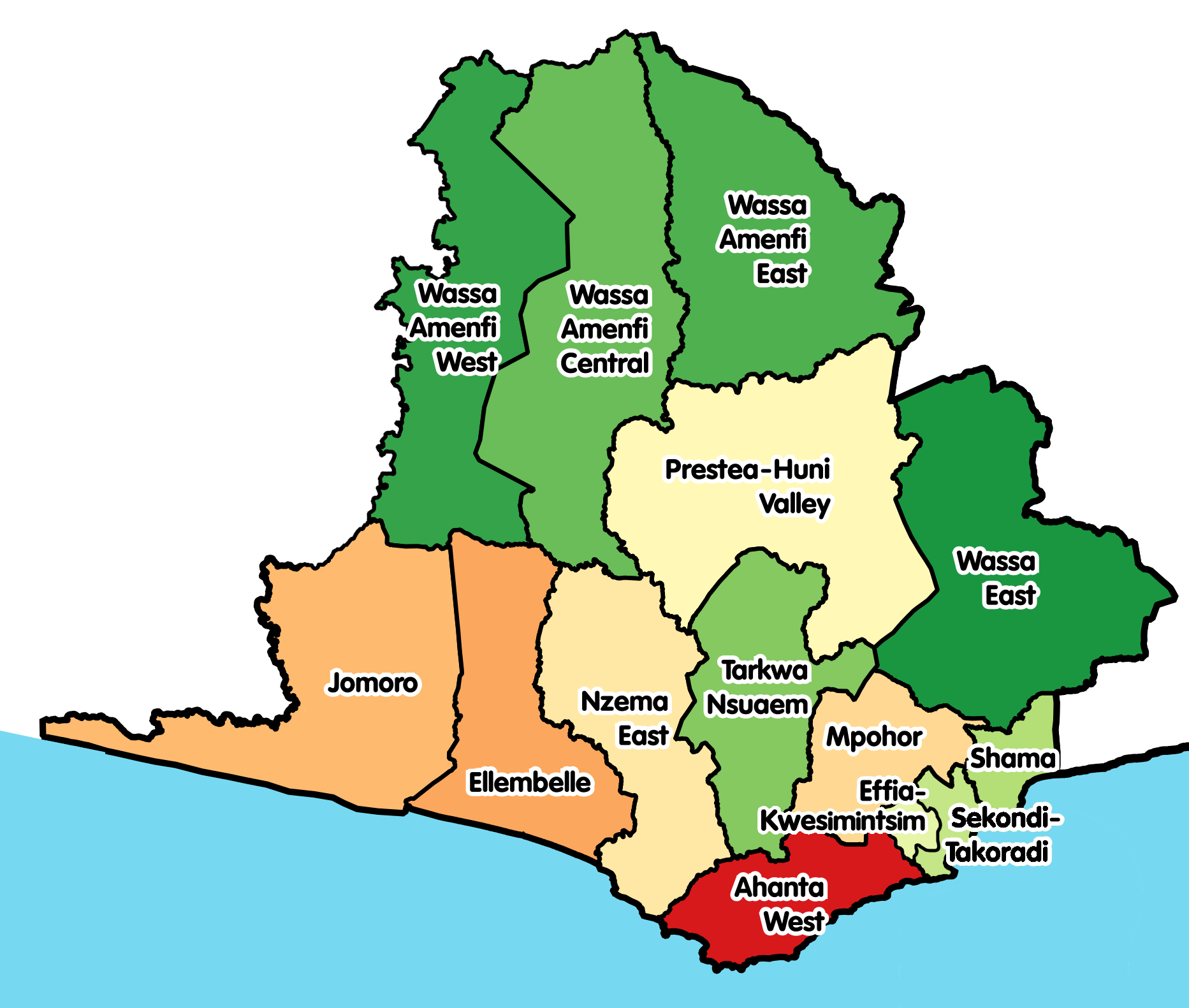
- Districts of Western Region

- Location of Shama District within Western
- Coordinates: 5°0′34.2″N 1°37′52.32″W
- Country: Ghana
- Region: Western
- Capital: Shama

Government
  - District Executive: Hon. Enoch Kojo Appiah
  - Succeeded: Hon. Joseph Amoah

Area
  - Total: 199.5 km^{2} (77.0 sq mi)

Population (2021)
  - Total: 117,224
  - Density: 587.6/km^{2} (1,522/sq mi)
- Time zone: UTC+0 (GMT)
- ISO 3166 code: GH-WP-SH

Shama District is one of the fourteen districts in Western Region, Ghana. "Originally, it was part of the then-larger Shama Ahanta East Metropolitan District in 1988, which was created from the former Sekondi Takoradi Metropolitan Authority Council" until the eastern part of the district was split off to create Shama District on 29 February 2008; thus the remaining part has been renamed as Sekondi Takoradi Metropolitan District. The district assembly is located in the southeast part of Western Region and has Shama as its capital town.

== Demographics ==
Shama District has a population of about 88,314 people and shares a border with the Gulf of Guinea. It has 42% of the active labor force of the population involved in fishing and farming. It also houses Fort San Sebastian, one of the former slaves fort in Ghana where slaves from all over Africa were kept before they were sent to the New World in the 1600s.

Pra Nye-Eyi Afahye, the festival of the people of Shama Traditional Area, is celebrated in every second week of November. It is a weeklong event and usually commences on Saturday and ends on Sunday of the following week.

== Sources ==
- "Districts of Ghana". Statoids.
- GhanaDistricts.com
