= Shama, Ghana =

Shama Esima Shema
- Town & District Capital
- Location of Shama in Western Region
- Coordinates: 5°1′N 1°38′W
- Country: Ghana
- Region: Western Region
- District: Shama Ahanta East Metropolitan District

Population (2013)
  - Total: 23,699
- Ranked 60th in Ghana
- Time zone: Greenwich Mean Time
  - Summer (DST): GMT

Shama or Esima is a fishing community, and it is the capital of Shama district, a district in the Western Region of Ghana. The town lies about 20 km east of Sekondi-Takoradi, on the mouth of the Pra River. The town is home to Fort San Sebastian, in whose graveyard philosopher Anton Wilhelm Amo, the first African known to have attended a European university, is interred.

The town is situated in the Shama Ahanta East Metropolitan district and Shama constituency of the Western region of Ghana. The people of the town are mostly engaged in fishing and its related activities such as fish processing for local markets. Shama is the sixtieth most populous settlement in Ghana, in terms of population, with a population of 117,224 people.
