= Leticia Quaye =

Ghanaian politician and trade union activist

Leticia Quaye was a member of the Convention People's Party (C.P.P) in the Gold Coast, a British colony in West Africa. She participated in Positive Action, a series of protests and strikes organised by the C.P.P and Gold Coast Trade Union Congress (T.U.C) in January 1950, as part of the campaign for self-government. Quaye along with several others, including Kwame Nkrumah, was arrested and charged with incitement. In a handwritten statement following her arrest Quaye outlined her involvement in Positive Action as follows:

On the 8th Jan 1950 a meeting was scheduled to be held at the West End Arena in the morning which afterwards was postponed till the afternoon.

I was present at about 3.45pm. When I was there the leaders of the C.P.P. had not arrived and the meeting not started. Mr. Provencal made an announcement to the effect that he noticed certain people were misbehaving as he was coming at the gate, and that he was appealing to all who had gather to behave and not to rough the whitemen who had come to enjoy the lecture. He spoke in English and after he had finished I translated into the GA language. That was all I did on 8th Jan 1950. I never uttered any word to incite anybody.

Nonetheless Quaye was convicted by the Magistrate's Court on 22 May 1950 for inciting others to take part in an illegal strike on 8 January 1950. Quaye appealed her conviction to the Supreme Court of the Gold Coast.

Henry Sonnie Torgbor Provencal, who Quaye mentioned in her statement, was convicted two months prior to Quaye, on 22 February 1950, for the same offence. Provencal also appealed his conviction to the Supreme Court of the Gold Coast.

In May 1951 Quaye was appointed as a propaganda secretary of the C.P.P along with several other women including Hannah Kudjoe, Alice Appiah, Ama Nkrumah and Sophia Doku. On 6 March 1957, the Gold Coast gained independence and the modern state of Ghana was born.
