= John Johnson (Ohio state representative) =

American politician (born 1937)

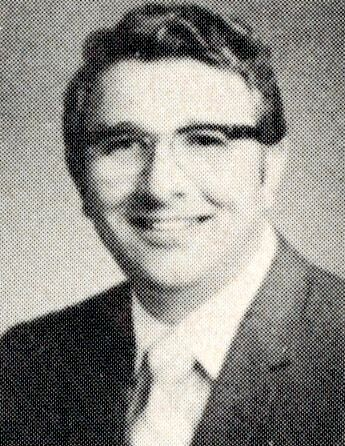

Member of the Ohio House of Representatives from the 68th district
- In office January 3, 1971 – December 31, 1980
- Preceded by: Ralph Fisher
- Succeeded by: Ron Amstutz

Personal details
- Born: October 26, 1937 (age 88) Monroe, Indiana, U.S.
- Party: Democratic

John Edward Johnson Jr. (born October 26, 1937) is an American politician who is a former member of the Ohio House of Representatives
