= Greater Cape Three Points Marine Protected Area =

Greater Cape Three Points Marine Protected Area is Ghana's first Marine Protected Area located at Greater Cape Three Points area in the Western Region. It was announced on the 14 April 2026. The area is known to have a variety of marine life like pelagic fish, turtles, dolphins and reef habitats. There are also mangroves and coastal ecosystems nearby which provide grounds for breeding and nursing fishes.

== Location and extent ==
The area spans about 700 square kilometres of both marine and nearshore coastal areas in Greater Cape Three Points at the southernmost tip of Ghana in the Western Region The MPA is home to about 21 coastal communities which have experienced declines in catch for years, making it harder for fishers to sustain livelihoods.

== Opening ==
Greater Cape Three Points Area was declared as Ghana's first ever MPA by the country's Vice President Professor Naana Jane Opoku-Agyemang on 14 April 2026 in a ceremony at Busua in the Western Region. This was after 15–20 years of preliminary work ahead of the formal recognition.

== Purpose ==
The MPA is deemed as a key ground for spawning and nursing pelagic fish and is believed to have the potential to restoring fish populations. The creation of the MPA helps Ghana's work to meet its commitment to the Kunming-Montreal Global Biodiversity Framework Target 3, which says 30% of the ocean is to be protected by 2030.

The protected area has a core zone where fishing is prohibited and multiple-use zones where fishing and some other activities will be strictly regulated, although permitted.
