= Ama Nkrumah =

Ghanaian female political activist

- Born: Ama Nkrumah

Ama Nkrumah was a Ghanaian female political activist during and after Ghana's independence struggle.

== Politics ==
Ama Nkrumah was one of the female political activists who was with Ghana's first president Dr. Kwame Nkrumah through the independence struggle and later served in various political capacities. In his autobiography, Kwame Nkrumah mentions how he heard of Ama Nkrumah, Ama being the female equivalent of his first name, when she got up on a platform at a rally and slashed her face with a blade, and smearing blood over her body. This gesture and her speech was noted as her way of challenging men to do likewise to show how no sacrifice was too great in the struggle for an independent Ghana.

== In popular culture ==
Ama Nkrumah is the eponymous subject of the opening poem in Woman, Eat Me Whole, Ghanaian author and spoken-word artist Ama Asantewa Diaka's first poetry collection.

== See also ==
- Sophia Oboshie Doku
- Hannah Cudjoe
- Susanna Al-Hassan
