= Sophia Oboshie Doku =

Ghanaian politician

- Born: Sophia Oboshie Doku; Ghana (Accra)
- Occupation: politician
- Known for: Member of Parliament

Sophia Margaret Oboshie Doku was a Ghanaian politician and one of the first female parliamentarians in the First Parliament of the First Republic of Ghana under Ghana's first President Dr Kwame Nkrumah.

== Education ==
Doku was trained as a teacher.

on==Politics== Doku was a political activist who served in various capacities and was one of the activists in the independence struggle.

She was also the first woman to serve in the First Republic's first parliament, which was led by President Kwame Nkrumah. However, she did not start her political career with the CPP. She became a founding member of the United Gold Coast Convention (UGCC) and one of the first executive members of the Accra chapter of the party. She was named the Department of Social Welfare's assistant welfare officer in 1953. She then became the first female camp superintendent of the Builders Brigade in 1958.

== See also ==
- Ama Nkrumah
- Hannah Cudjoe
- Susanna Al-Hassan
