= Ralph Fisher =

Ralph Fisher (1746–1803) was an English slave trader based in Liverpool who was responsible for over 100 slave voyages. He is said to have been the seventh-biggest slave trader in Liverpool.

== Slave trade ==
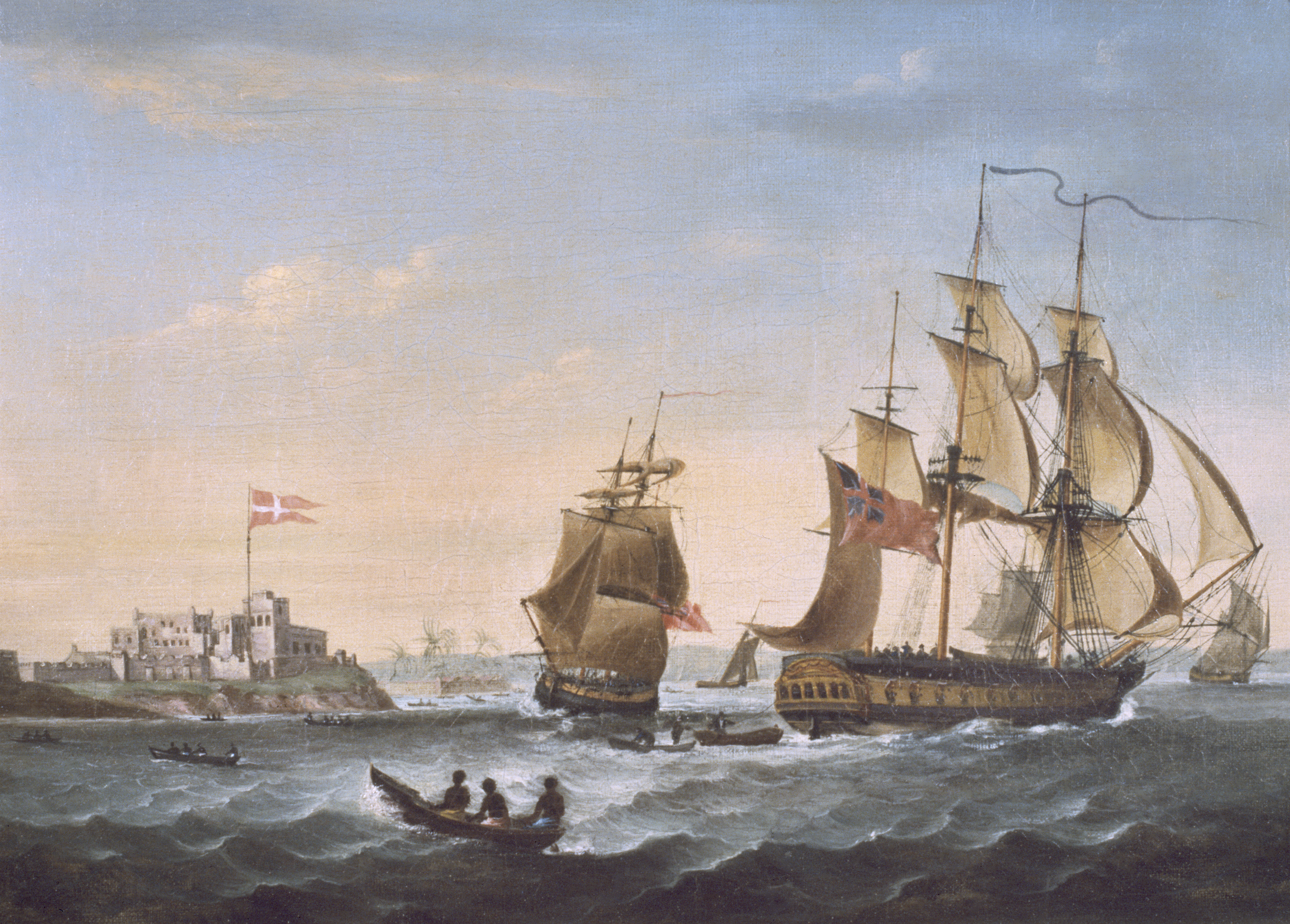
Two British slave ships off the coast of West Africa – painting by George Webster circa 1800

Ralph Fisher was born in Liverpool and operated out of the Port of Liverpool. In 1790, Fisher owned five slave ships and by the weight of those ships he was the seventh-largest slave trader in Liverpool.

Fisher employed Richard Kendall, one of Liverpool's leading slave-ship captains between 1783 and 1798. Kendall worked aboard Fisher's ships Brothers, Matty and Betty and Fisher (built in 1786). Kendall's first command was aboard Brothers. Richard Kendall met a Miss Dobson later in his life, they became acquaintances and she recorded her conversations with him. She described one event that involved his 16-year-old son John Kendall. Father and son left Liverpool on board Brothers bound for West Africa on a slave voyage. John Kendall angered his father, who threw him into the Irish Sea as the ship passed Perch Rock. The ship sailed on and it was not until its return, a year later, that Richard Kendall discovered his son was still alive. She wrote, "Captain Kendall was a specimen of what the frightful traffic in human creatures can make a man, but it left him the virtues of uprightness and truthfulness. Tho', I believe, had needs been, he would have cared little for taking the life of a man".

Fisher re-employed Richard Kendall upon his return to Liverpool and later Kendall moved from being a captain to become a slave trader himself. John Kendall also became a slave ship Captain, Fisher gave him his very first command, on a slave ship called Swift. Later John Kendall became the captain of his father's slave ship Manchester. Richard Kendall retired to Caton in Lancashire and lived until he was 80 years old, John Kendall died on a slave voyage in 1804 while on board William in West Africa.

Fisher was known to buy African enslaved people with brass. In 1792, unusually, two of Fisher's ships Echo and Philip Steven returned to Liverpool without a cargo. Echo had been away from port for 364 days and Philip Steven for 612 days. Drake writes that it is likely these ships were contracted by other slaver traders to travel the coast of West Africa buying enslaved people which were then transferred onto another slave ship for onward travel to the West Indies.

== Sources ==
- Richardson, David (2007). Liverpool and Transatlantic Slavery. UK: Liverpool University Press. ISBN 978-1-84631-066-9.
- Drake, B. K. "The Liverpool-African voyage c. 1790-1807" (PDF). The Historic Society of Lancashire and Cheshire.
- Inikori, J. E. (1981). "Market Structure and the Profits of the British African Trade in the Late Eighteenth Century". The Journal of Economic History. 41 (4): 745–776. doi:10.1017/S0022050700044880. S2CID 154206808.
