= Busua =

- Town
- Location of Busua in Western Region
- Coordinates: 4°48′0″N 1°56′0″W
- Country: Ghana
- Region: Western Region

Population (2012)
  - Total: 5,000
  - Ethnicity: Akan people
- Time zone: GMT
  - Summer (DST): GMT

Busua is a beach resort and fishing village in the Ahanta West District of the Western Region in Ghana, about 30 kilometers west of the regional capital, Sekondi-Takoradi in the Gulf of Guinea. Busua is classified in the category of towns with more than 5,000 inhabitants, with a paved road from Sekondi to reach the town. The inhabitants speak the Akan language dialect Ahanta. Busua fishing village is known for blue marlin and tuna fishery.

== History ==
Busua has until the 1960s been a town with a tradition as a being an seaside resort for wealthy locals from Sekondi-Takoradi. In the 1970s and 1980s, there were also a number of European tourists who visit Busua, although there was until the late 1990s, neither electricity nor running water. A small bungalow resort was the only tourist infrastructure, electricity in the town was occasionally available in the weekends by a generator.

In the early 1990s, the town was affected, as well as the whole of the surrounding coastal area of a palm disease which affected all the town's coconut trees, so all the town's coconut trees have now died. What remains is a long sandy beach, along a coastline that is free of dangerous currents.

=== 21st century ===
In recent years the town has not only obtained full electricity connection, but also restaurants and several cottages and bungalows and luxury real estate. From Busua can be reached on foot in about 25 minutes to the west the fishing village of Dixcove, the old original British stronghold Fort Metal Cross and to the east of the small town, the former Dutch fortress Fort Batenstein (in English, Fort Baten stone) can both be visited.

== Gallery ==
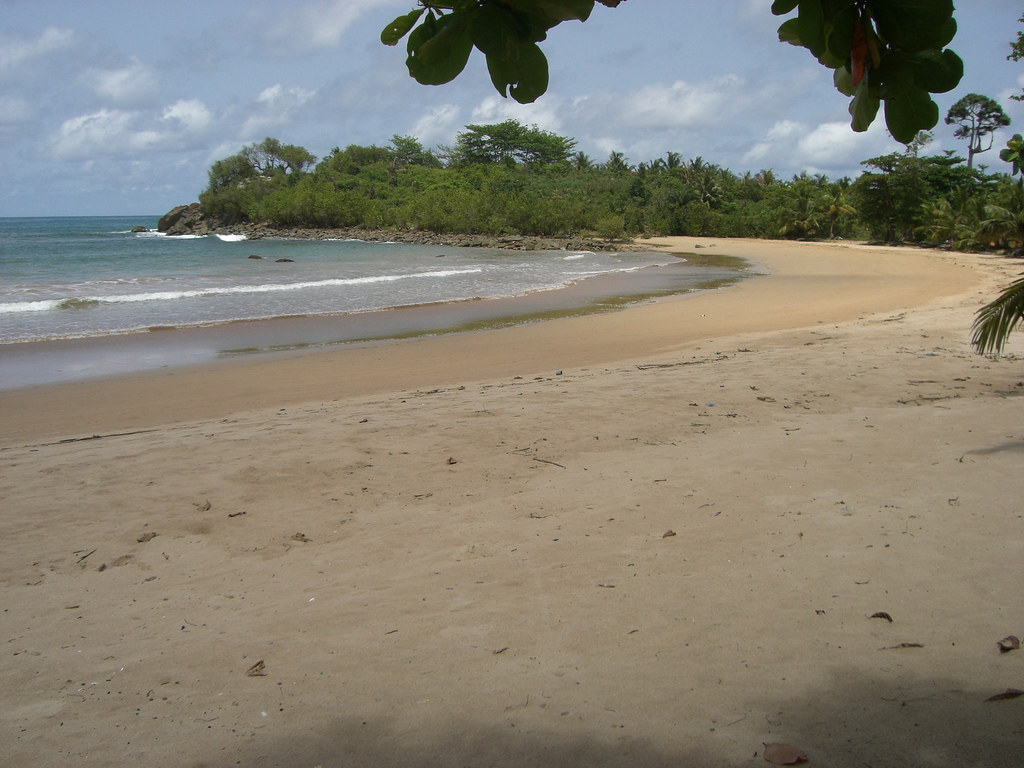
Busua Beach

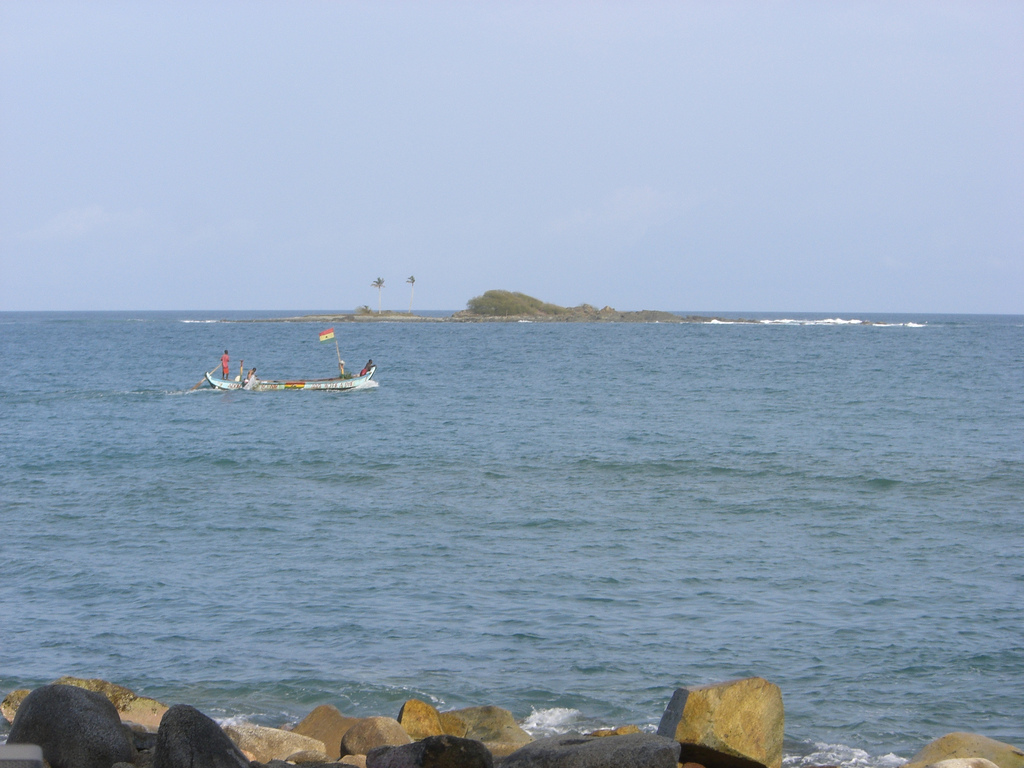
Coast of Busua

== Literature ==
- Jojo Cobbinah: Ghana, practical guidebook for the "Gold Coast" of West Africa, Frankfurt 2005.
