= Hannah Kudjoe =

Ghanaian activist (1918–1986)

- Picture of Hannah Kudjoe with unnamed great-niece, taken by her nephew, Peter Dadson.

Personal details
- Born: December 1918
- Died: 9 March 1986 (aged 67)
- Party: Convention People's Party
- Other political affiliations: United Gold Coast Convention

Hannah Esi Badu Kudjoe (née Hannah Dadson; December 1918 – 9 March 1986) was a prominent activist for Ghanaian independence in the 1940s and 1950s. She was one of the first high-profile female nationalists in the movement, and was the National Propaganda Secretary for the Convention People's Party. She was a political activist during the government of Dr. Kwame Nkrumah. She was also an active philanthropist and worked to improve women's lives in Northern Ghana. . She was able to convince others to support and fight for independence. She helped Kwame Nkrumah in bringing people to join the CPP and support it. She once helped the Big Six when they were arrested by bringing people together to call for their release by the colonial government.

== Early life ==
Born in Busua (near Dixcove), in the Ahanta District in the Western Region of the Gold Coast (now Ghana) in December 1918 to Mr. and Mrs. John Peter Dadson of Busua, Kudjoe was the youngest of 10 children. She was one of the privileged few girls that went to school in an era where few girls went to school. She started her elementary education at Busua Methodist School and completed at Sekondi Methodist School. After finishing school, she became a popular dressmaker in Tarkwa, where she married J. C. Kudjoe. He was a manager of Abontiako gold mines near Tarkwa. The marriage did not last, and she began living with her brother, E. K. Dadson, a prominent United Gold Coast Convention (UGCC) activist.

== Political career ==
=== Early political activism ===
In June 1947, she had the chance of meeting Kwame Nkrumah, when he lounged in their house when he made a trip to Tarkwa. This happened shortly after he had returned to Ghana in 1947 from studying abroad in the United States and Britain for over a decade in order to take up the position of general secretary of the United Gold Coast Convention, a political party formed by George Paa Grant to fight against British colonialists and grant Ghana its independence. Kwame Nkrumah convinced her of the importance of women in politics.

She described how she met Dr. Kwame Nkrumah and inspired her entry into politics at an International Women's Day symposium at the Accra Community Centre on 8 March 1986:

Somewhere in June 1947, we received a charming gentleman, he was introduced to me by my brother as Kwame Nkrumah, General-Secretary of the UGCC. During the day, my brother went out with Nkrumah to address various meetings of the local UGCC branch in town... One day, as they came back and I was serving Kwame Nkrumah, he asked me why I have not been attending the UGCC meetings in town. I was amazed by his question and I honestly told him I thought politics was only men’s business. For the next twenty or so minutes, Kwame Nkrumah explained to me all they were doing and the importance of everybody, especially

By the time Kwame Nkrumah left... my interest was aroused in politics. At work, I began explaining issues to my colleague seamstresses and customers. Whenever I was traveling to visit my dressmaking clients, I talked on trains about the need for our liberation and urging people to join the Tarkwa branch of the UGCC and summoning people together to hear news of the campaign for self-government.

After that encounter with Kwame Nkrumah, she subsequently become a key supporter of the United Gold Coast Convention (UGCC) began raising support for the UGCC, to the extent that when the Big Six were arrested, Kudjoe raised funds and led a campaign for their release. She was a founding member of the Committee of Youth Organization (CYO) within the UGCC and was one of the seven signatories who endorsed an April 1949 document that threatened a full split away from the UGCC if Kwame Nkrumah wasn't reinstated as the parties general secretary.

=== Convention People's Party ===
Unfortunately, Kwame Nkrumah was not reinstated so there was a split which brought to the formation of the Convention People's Party (CPP), as a keen supporter of his ideals she also moved along with Kwame Nkrumah after the split. She was the only woman present when the decision to split was made.

Kudjoe was also an active participant of the Positive Action, a campaign of mass civil disobedience coupled with political protests that eventually led to the end of colonial rule, Nkrumah's election victory and the formation of an independent nation.She inspired massive support for the CPP through this campaign.

Kudjoe rose to become the organizer and the National Propaganda Secretary of the CPP. In that role she toured the country advocating the need for independence and organizing rallies propagating the Nkrumah movement and the CPP. She was an extremely effective organizer, mobilizing many people, including women, to join the CPP. The CPP eventually won the 1951 elections and Kwame Nkrumah became the leader of Government business. After the 1951 elections she focused more on her role in the party by growing the party's base and building support.

==== After independence ====
After Ghana gained its independence from the British, Kudjoe founded the All-Africa Women's league in 1957 still focusing on the Pan African views, which later became the Ghana Women's League.

Whilst working in her official roles with the CPP in the 1950s and 1960s, Kudjoe was also undertaking social welfare works within the Northern regions of Ghana teaching both young women and adults basic life skills in hygiene, home keeping, dressing and how to raise children. She later on became the national organizer for the Ministry of Labor and Social protection whilst still undertaking her social welfare works in the north. In 1964, her social welfare programme in the north was placed under management of the National Committee Social Advancement under the ministry of Labor and social protection. Whilst working at the Ministry she also became secretary of Ghana Day Nurseries and worked to establish day nurseries and nursery schools throughout the country alongside recruiting workers and teachers and providing amenities for the establishments of all those schools.

She also championed an anti-nudity campaign in Northern Ghana. This included the free distribution of clothing donated from other countries. She taught women hygiene practices, such as how to boil water to bathe children. She undertook this work largely independently of the new government, leading to disapproval from the government, who minimized her role. She also helped distribute food in times of famine, and encouraged women to farm to grow their own food.

=== Aftermath of 1966 coup d'état ===
After Kwame Nkrumah was overthrown by the military on 24 February 1966, Kudjoe left the political scene like every CPP member and returned to her private life. She continued with her philanthropic works in the north through the 1970' and 1980's till she died in 1986. Her final scene in the public domain was when she addressed an International Women's Day symposium at the Accra Community Centre on 8 March 1986, a night before she died.

== Death ==
Hannah Kudjoe died on 9 March 1986. Her obituary published on 8 May 1986 ends: "She was a priceless gem who in no small measure contributed to the political emancipation of Ghana from the clutches of imperialism. The vacuum created by her demise in spiritual terms though temporary, will be difficult to fill." Her funeral took place at the Calvary Methodist Church in Accra on 6 July 1986.

== Sources ==
- Allman, Jean, ed. (2004). Fashioning Africa: Power and the Politics of Dress. Indiana University Press. ISBN 9780253111043.
- Allman, Jean (2009). "The Disappearing of Hannah Kudjoe". Journal of Women's History. 21 (3): 13–35. doi:10.1353/jowh.0.0096. S2CID 143920628.
- Little, Kenneth (1973). African Women in Towns: An Aspect of Africa's Social Revolution. CUP Archive. ISBN 9780521098199.
- Owusu-Ansah, David (2014). Historical Dictionary of Ghana. Rowman & Littlefield. ISBN 9780810875005.
