= Fort Metal Cross =

Ghanaian military structure

- Part of British Gold Coast
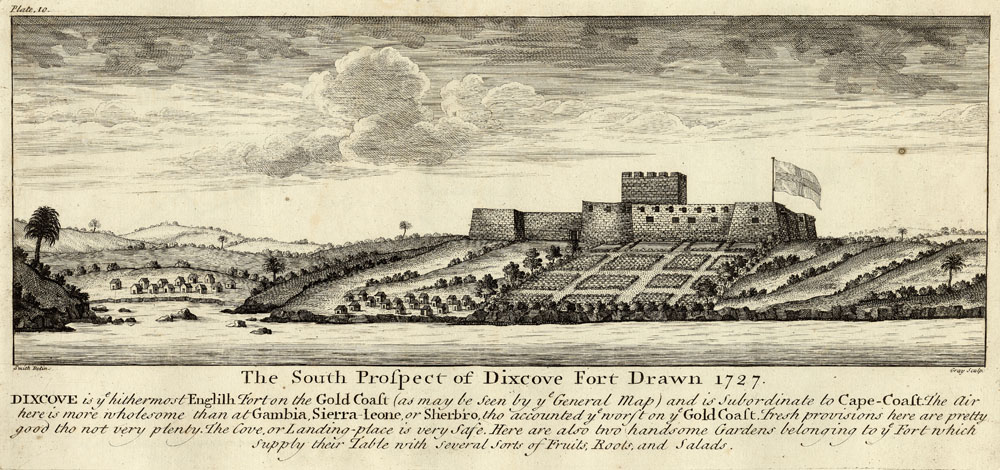
- Fort Metal Cross in 1727.

Location
- Coordinates: 4.79321°N 1.94484°W

Site history
- Built: 1683

Garrison information
- Occupants: Britain (1683-1868); Netherlands (1868-1872)

UNESCO World Heritage Site
- Location: Dixcove, Western Region, Ghana
- Part of: Forts and Castles, Volta, Greater Accra, Central and Western Regions
- Criteria: Cultural: (vi)
- Reference: 34-008
- Inscription: 1979 (3rd Session)

Fort Metal Cross, originally Fort Dixcove, is a military structure located on a promontory at the fishing community of Infuma in Dixcove, in the Western Region of Ghana. Because of its history in the Atlantic slave trade and its testimony to European-African trade, the Fort was included as one of the Forts and Castles of Volta, Greater Accra, Central and Western Regions that became a World Heritage Site in 1979.

== History ==
Brandenburg-Prussia started building Fort Groß Friedrichsburg about 15 kilometres (9.3 mi) west of Dixcove in 1683, (now Princes Town) in the colony of Brandenburger Gold Coast but it was not completed until the 1690s.

Fort Metal Cross was besieged twice in 1712 by John Kanu, a local ally of the Prussians, but the fort was defended successfully.

The fort was transferred to the Dutch as part of a large trade of forts between Britain and the Netherlands in 1868 under the Anglo-Dutch Gold Coast Treaty. It was renamed Fort Metalen Kruis. Four years later, however, on 6 April 1872, the fort was, with the entire Dutch Gold Coast, again transferred to the United Kingdom, as per the Gold Coast treaty of 1871. The Dutch name stuck, however, translated as Fort Metal Cross. It was known as ‘the fake mint of the Gold Coast’ by author Bosman because the gold that was mined was mostly impure gold. This led to the promise of gold never happened. The fort was a service station for the supply of timber from nearby forest and repairing of ships. It was also used as a slave prison during the slave trade. The British and Dutch had a fort exchange agreement in 1867 and the Dutch became the owners of the fort. The Dutch later sold their forts to the British.

== Current ==
The fort has been both a Police Station and a Postal station. It has been leased to a private institution by an English citizen, Robert Fidler, and his family, and is maintained as a tourist site and congregation point for churches.

== Gallery ==
=== Prints and drawings ===
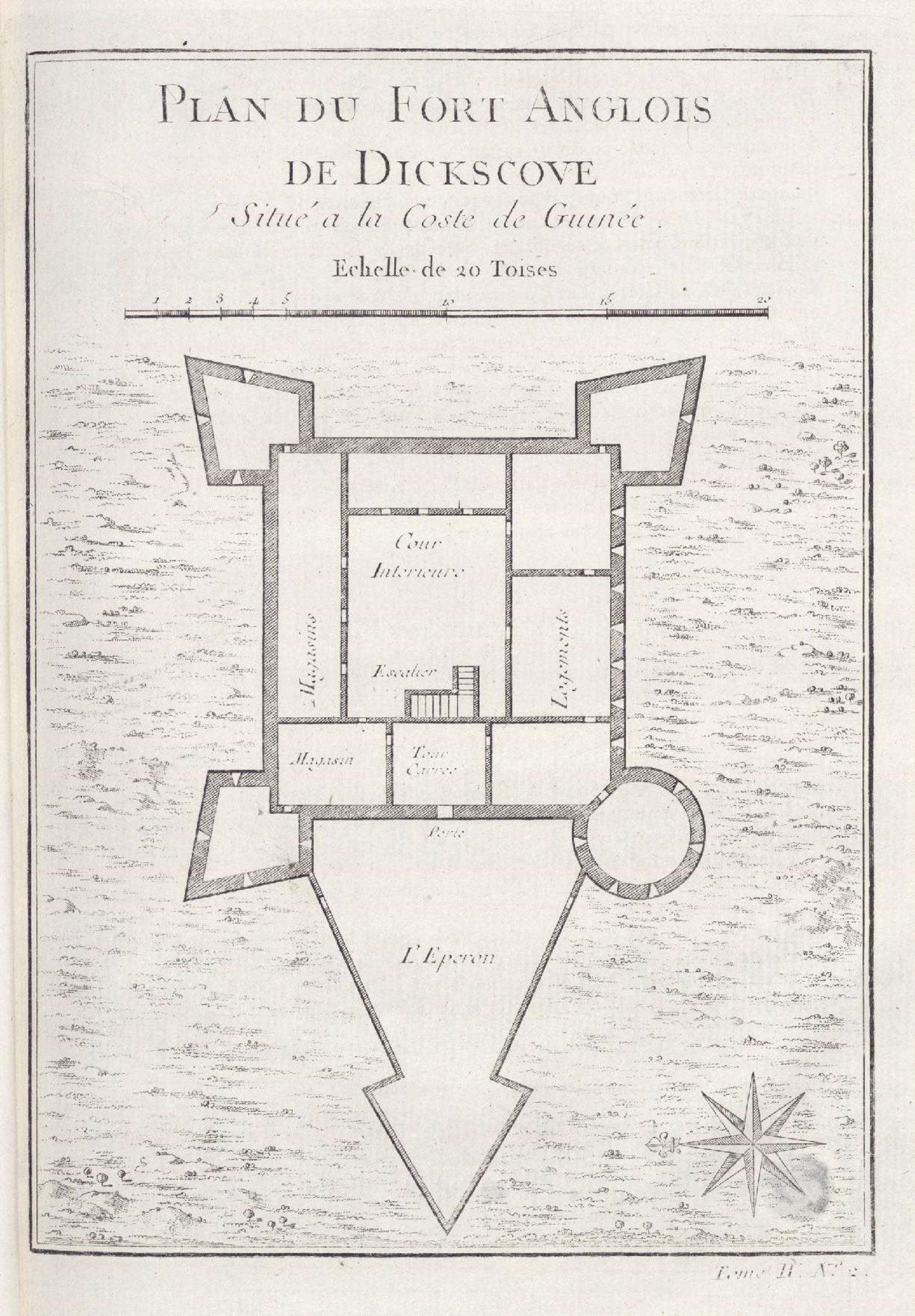
Map of fort, 1746

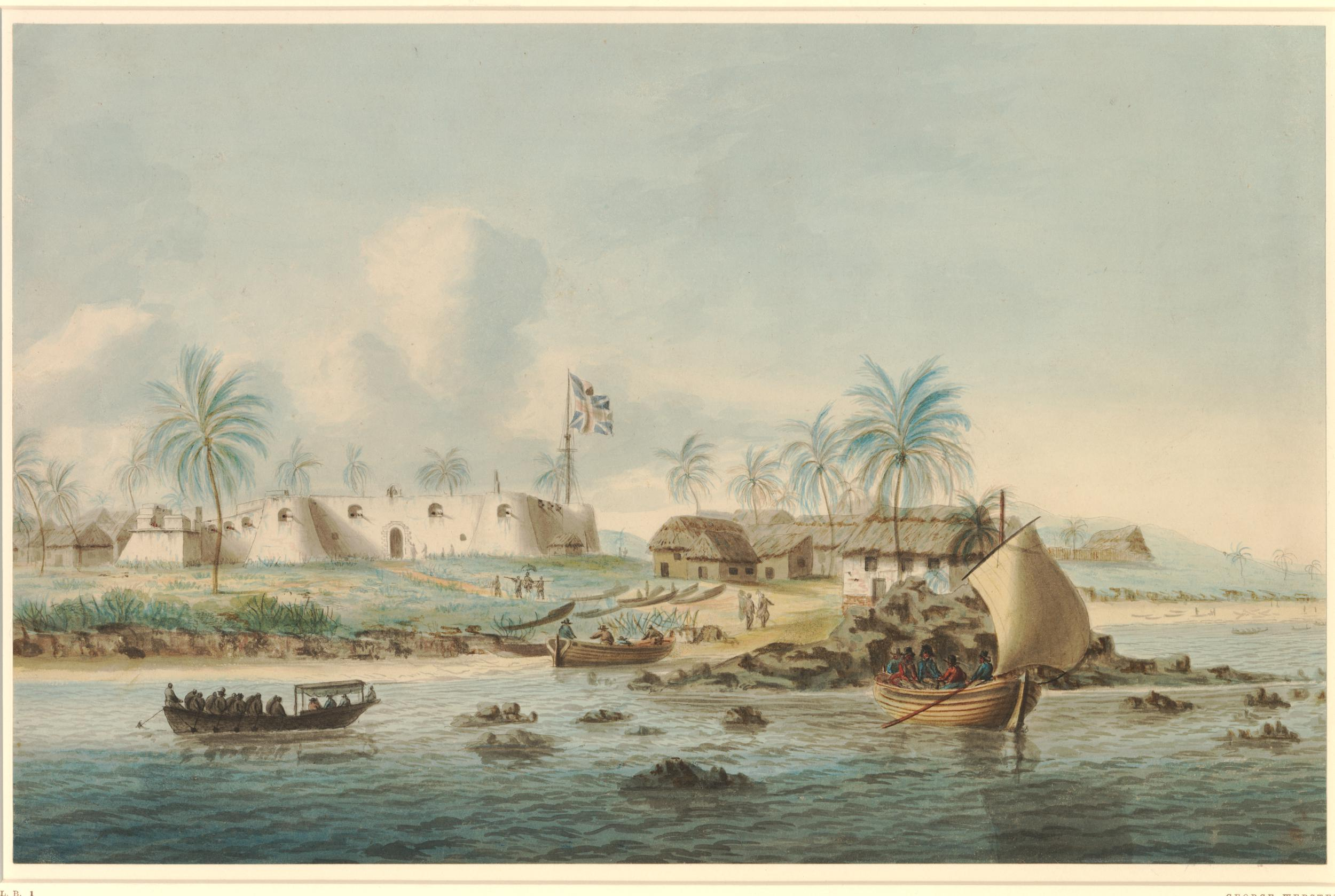
Drawing from 1806 by George Webster

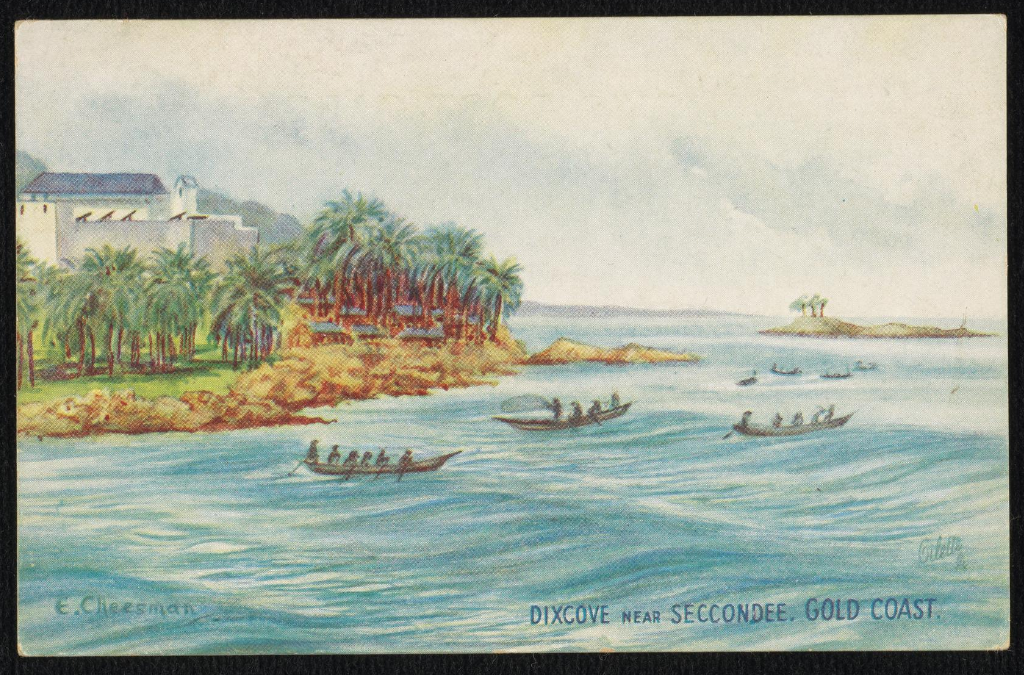
A painting by Edith Cheeseman from the 1920s, later published as a postcard. It depicts Fort Metal Cross as well as Alatakron, the village at the base of the fort which was inhabited by ancestors of migrants from Lagos, who worked as tradespeople maintaining the fort.

=== Photographs ===
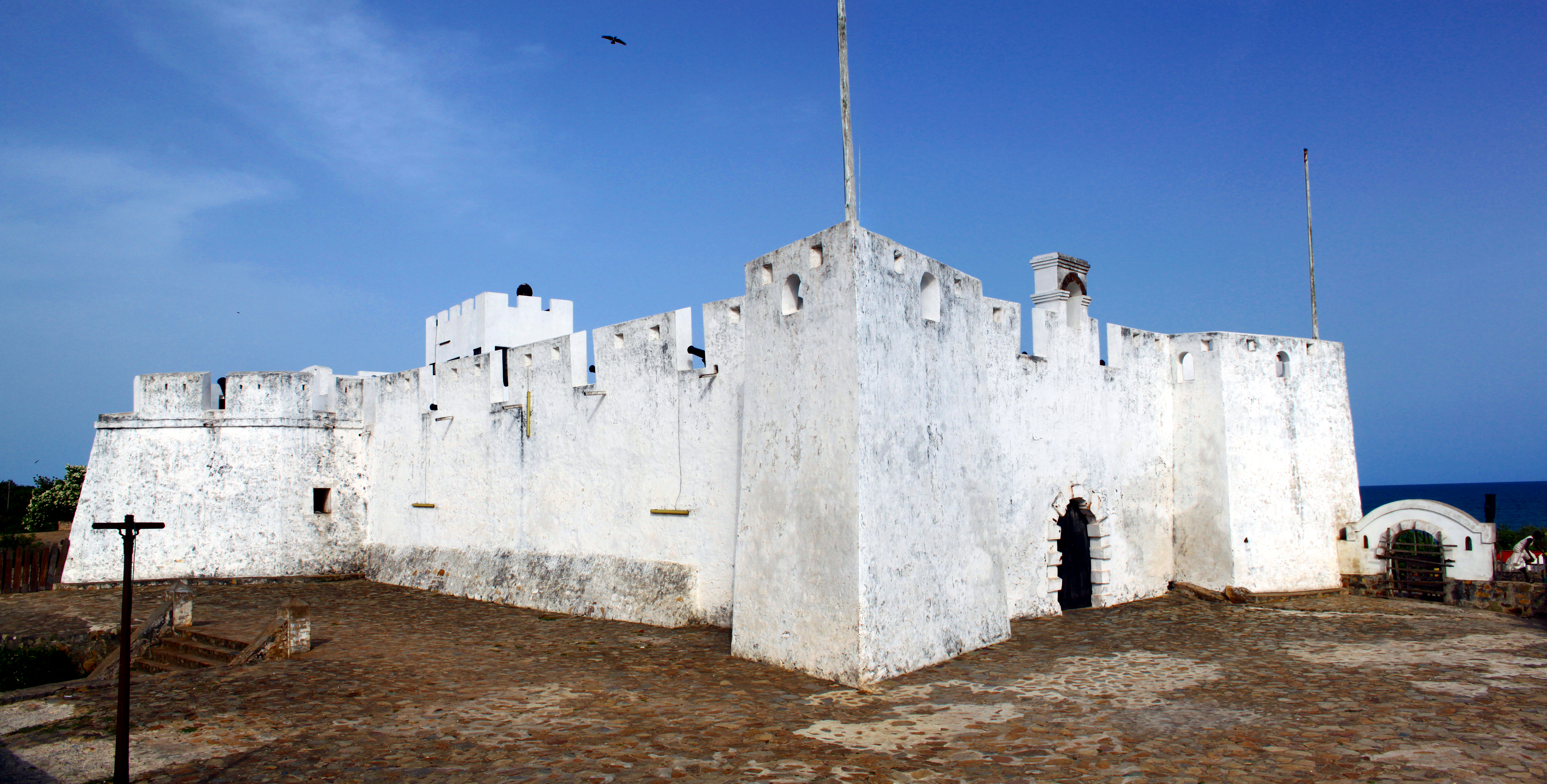
Exterior photograph of Fort Metal Cross, Dixcove, Western Region, Ghana. It is composed of two images stitched together taken from just outside

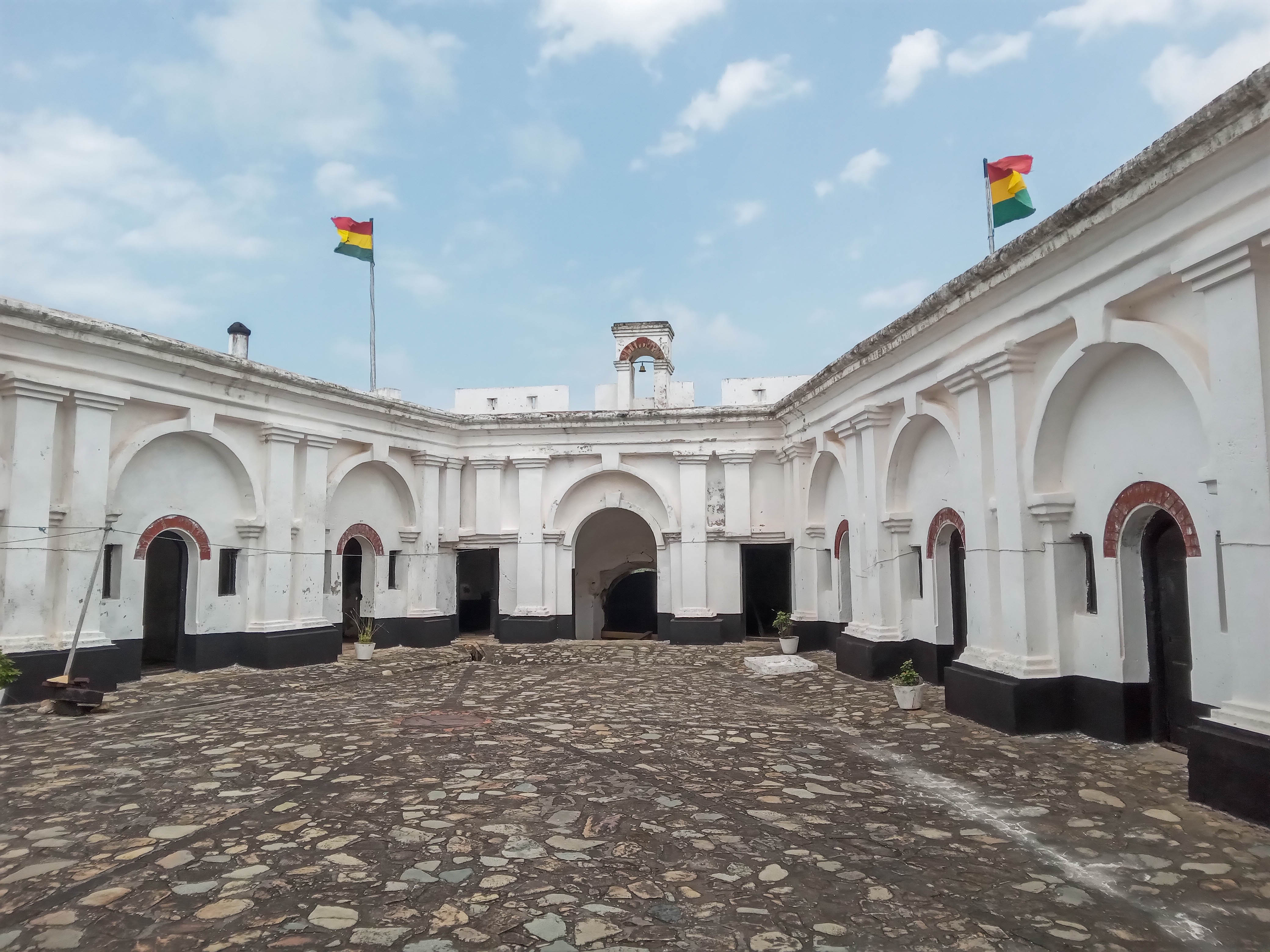
Fort metal cross in Ghana

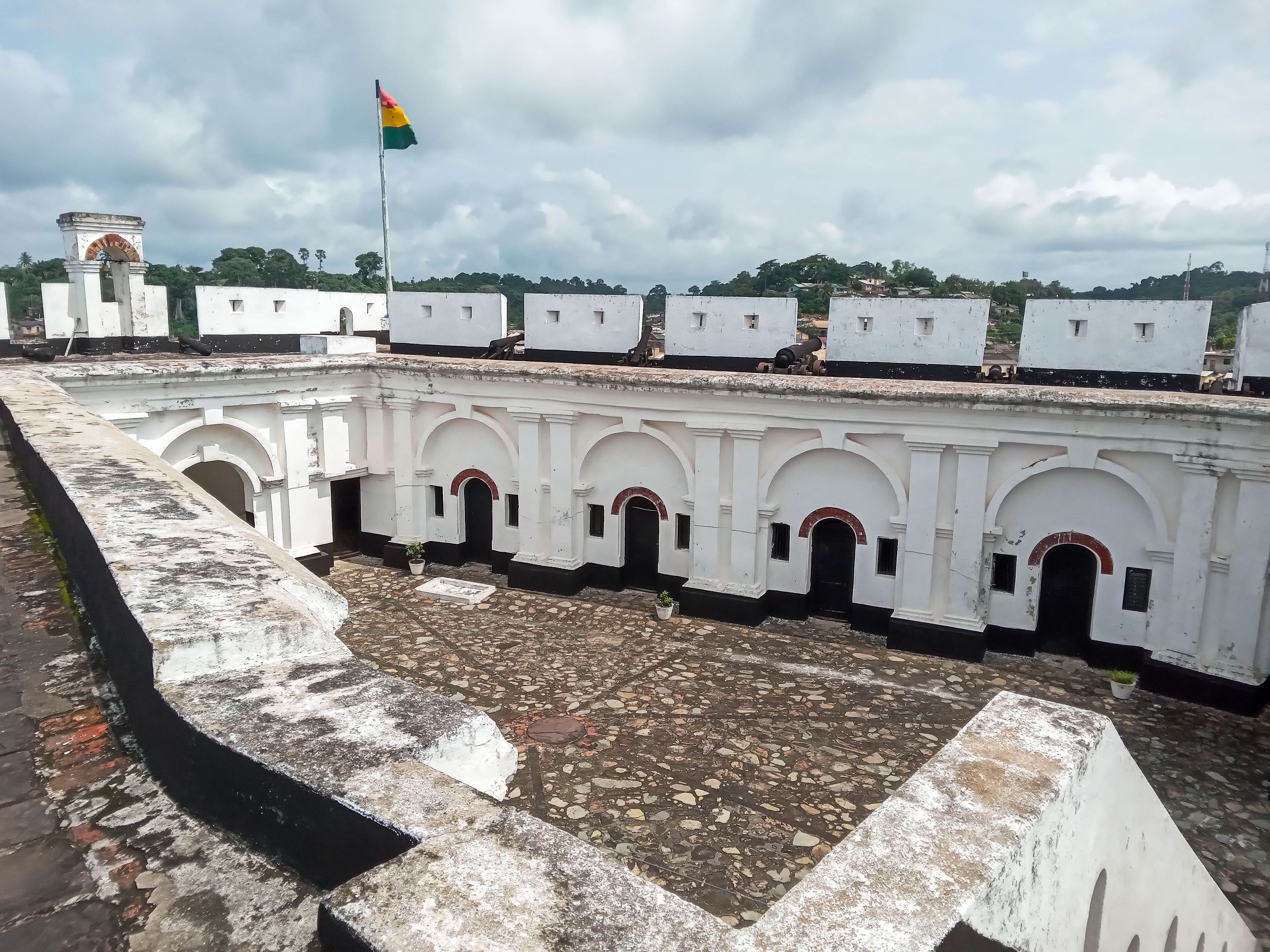
Fort Metal Cross in Ghana

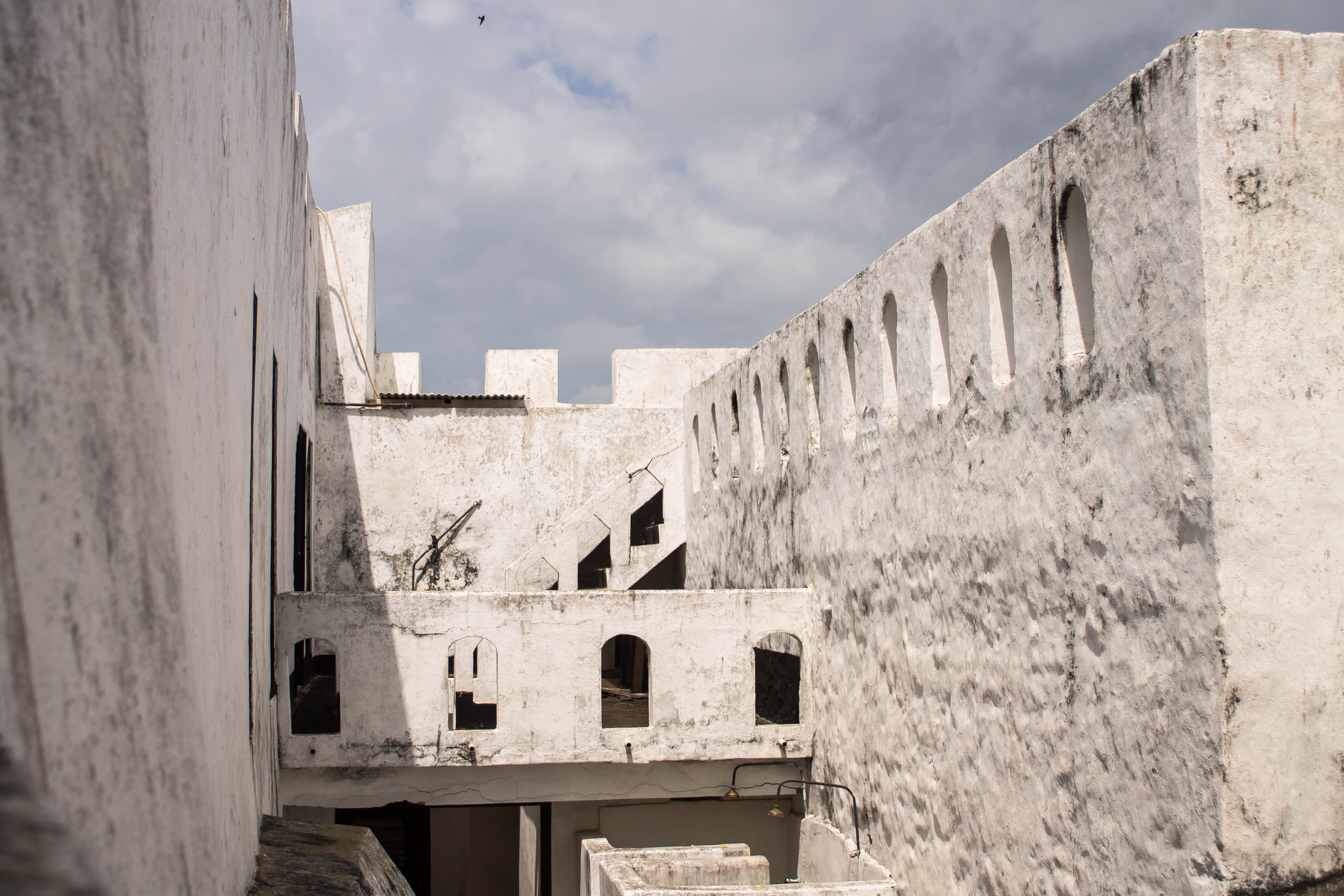
Fort Metal Cross

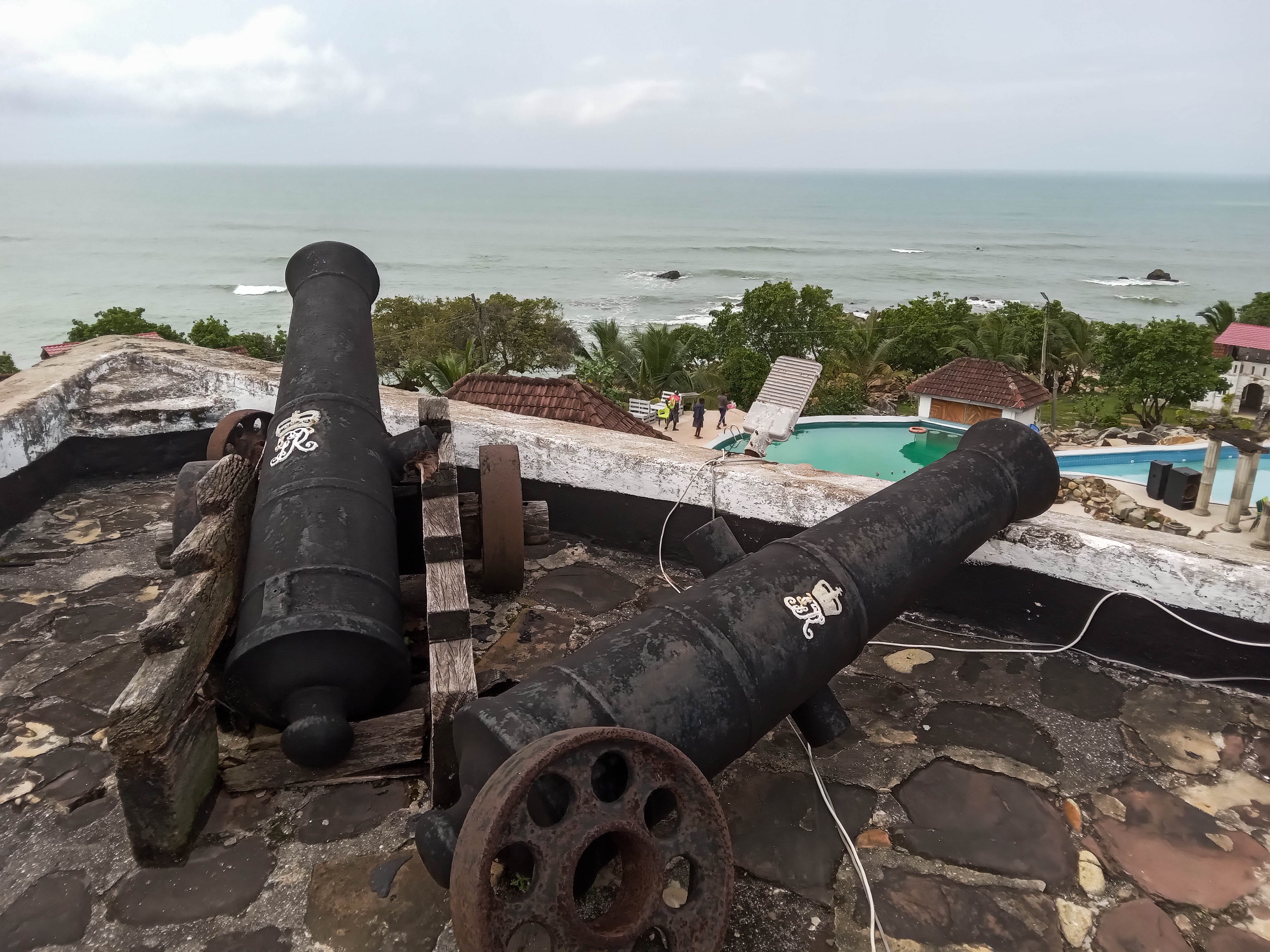
Cannon ball at Fort Metal Cross

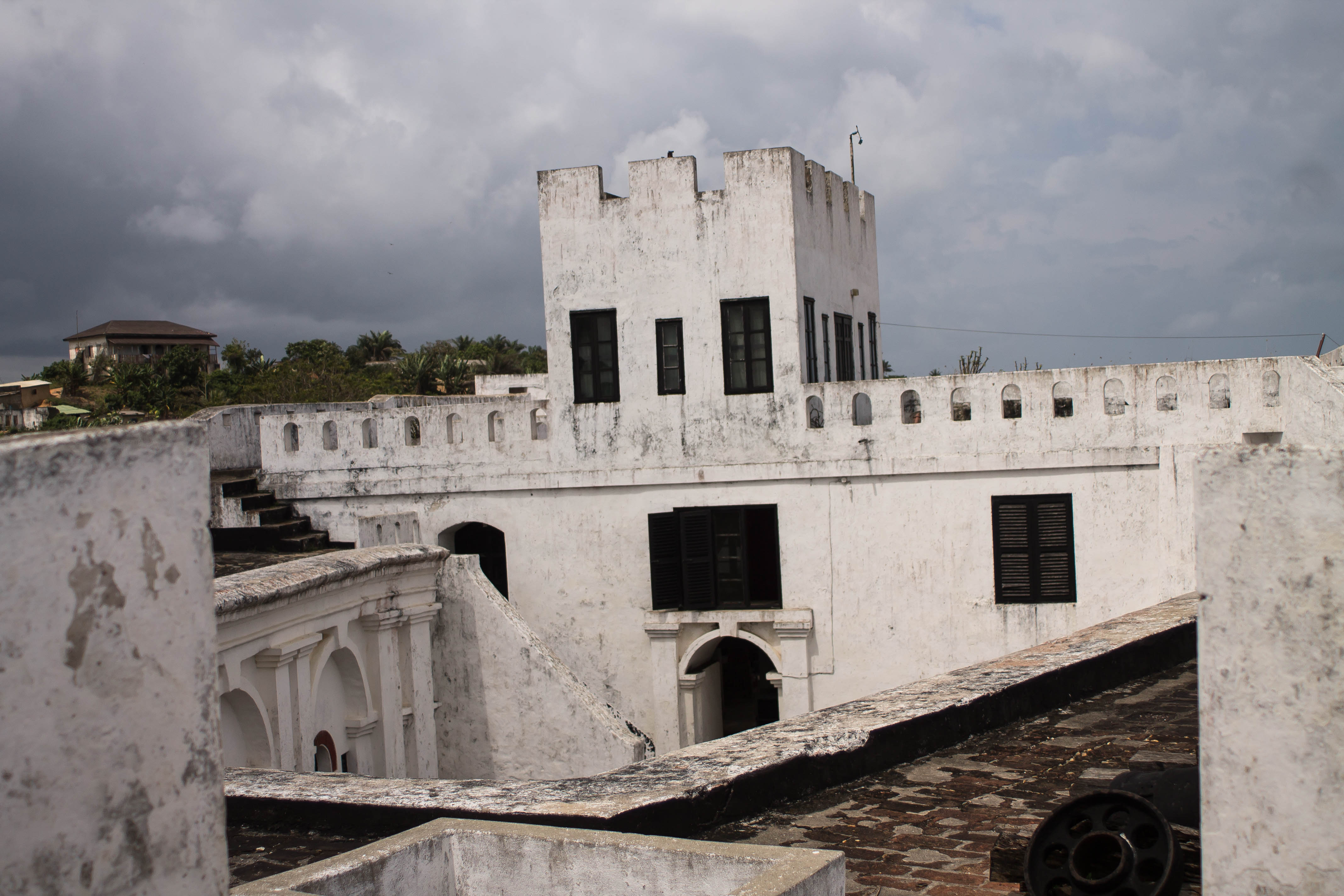
A view of Fort Metal Cross

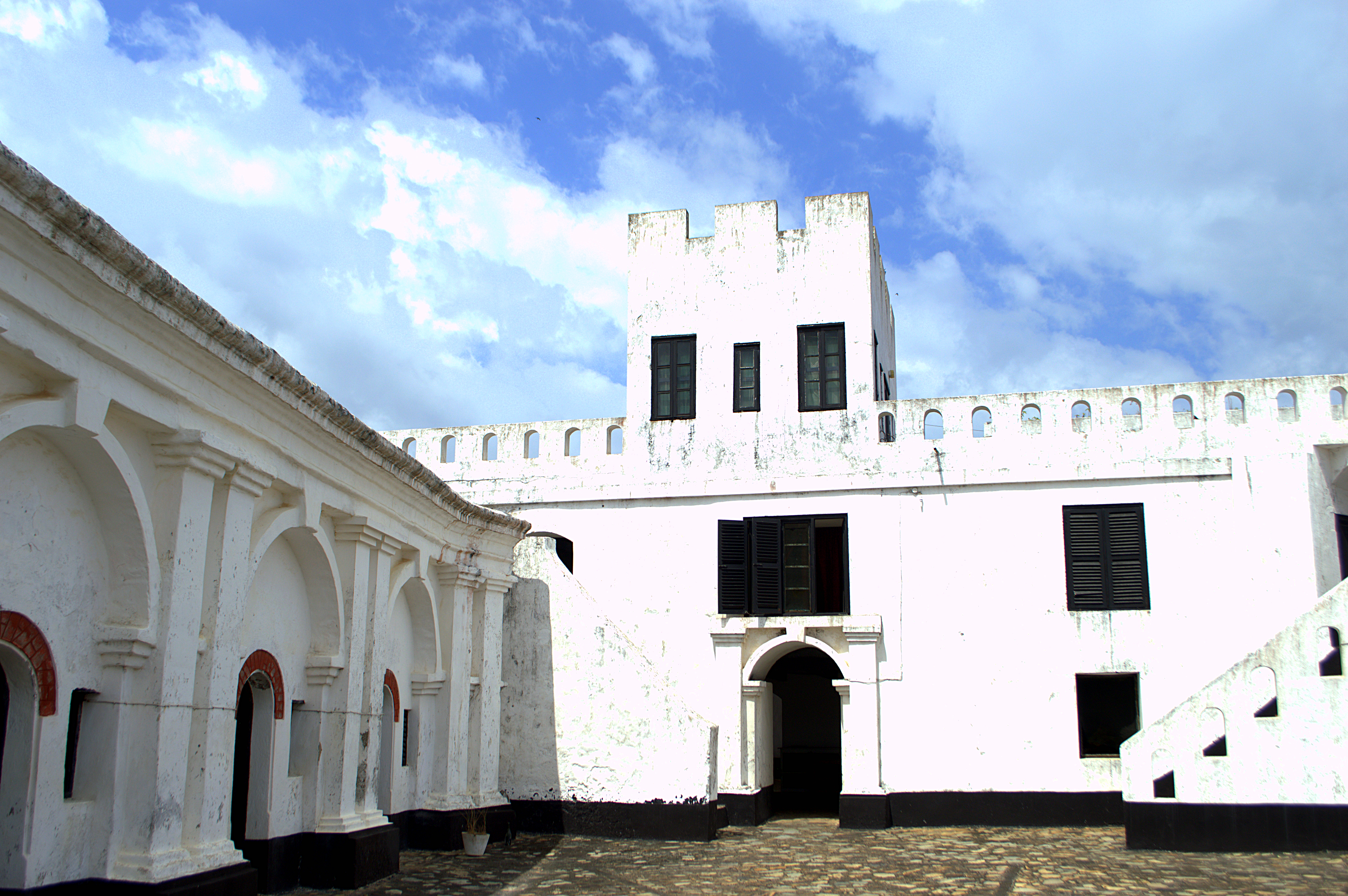
Fort Metal Cross

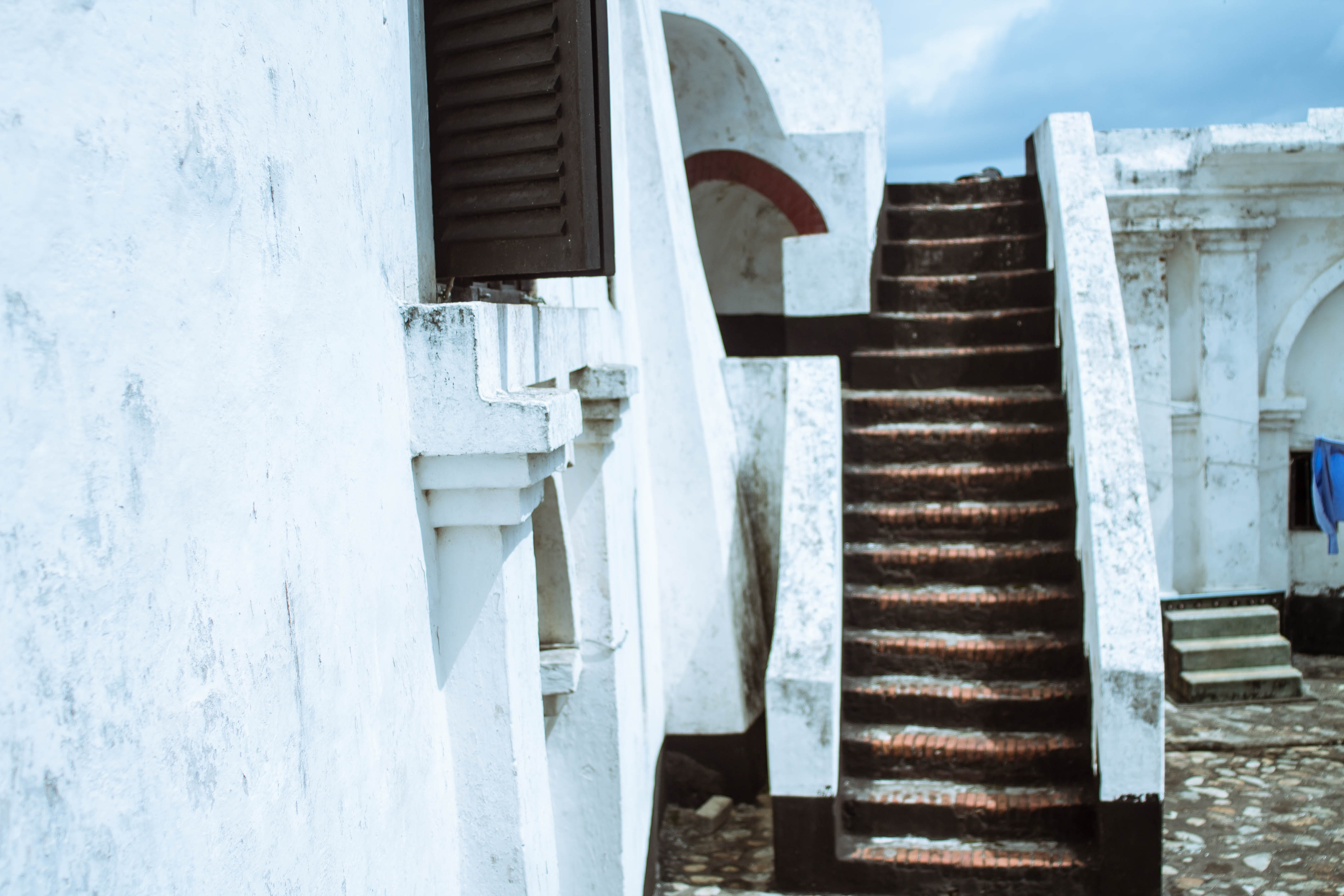
Fort Metal Cross

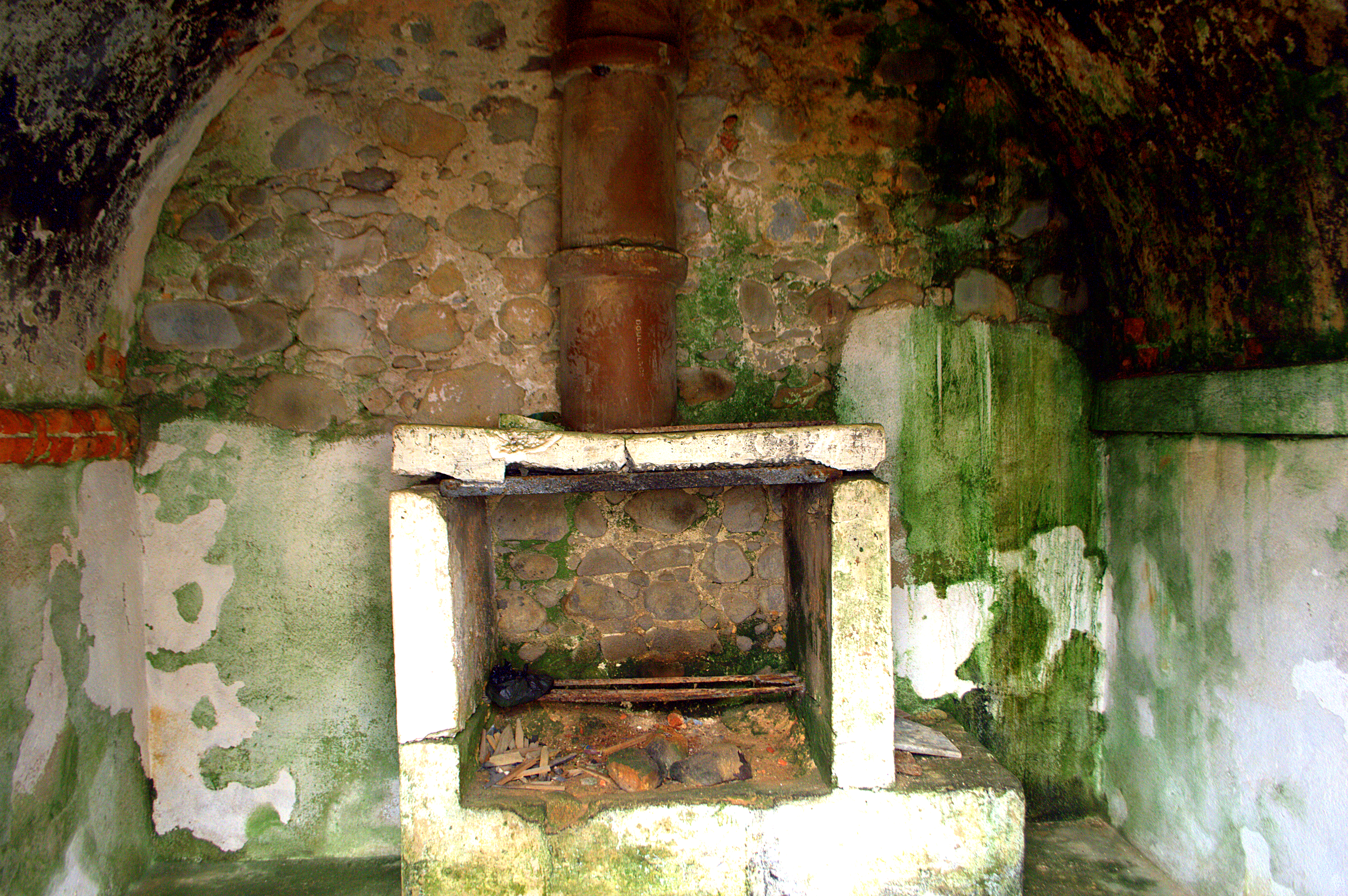
Fort Metal Cross

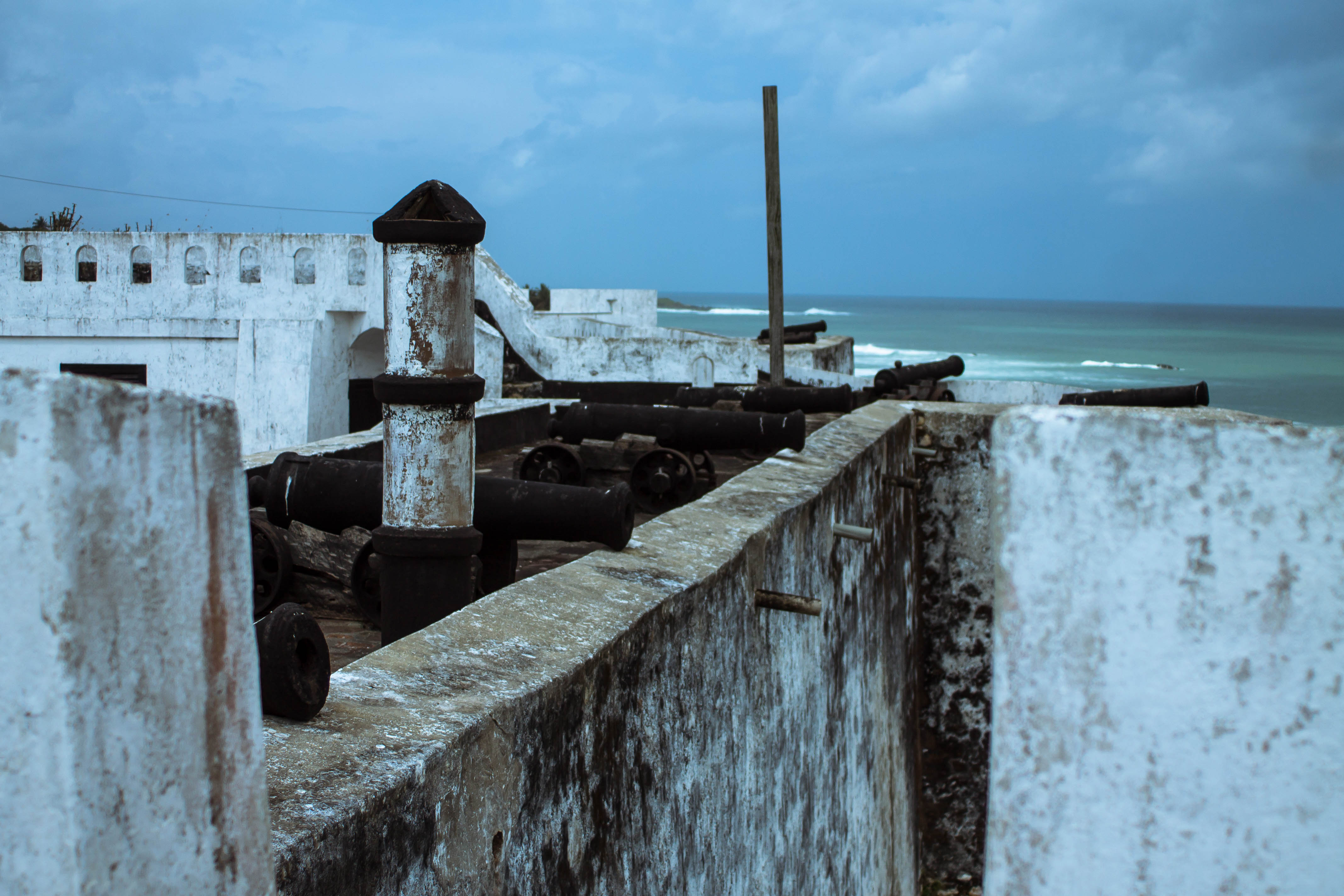
Fort Metal Cross

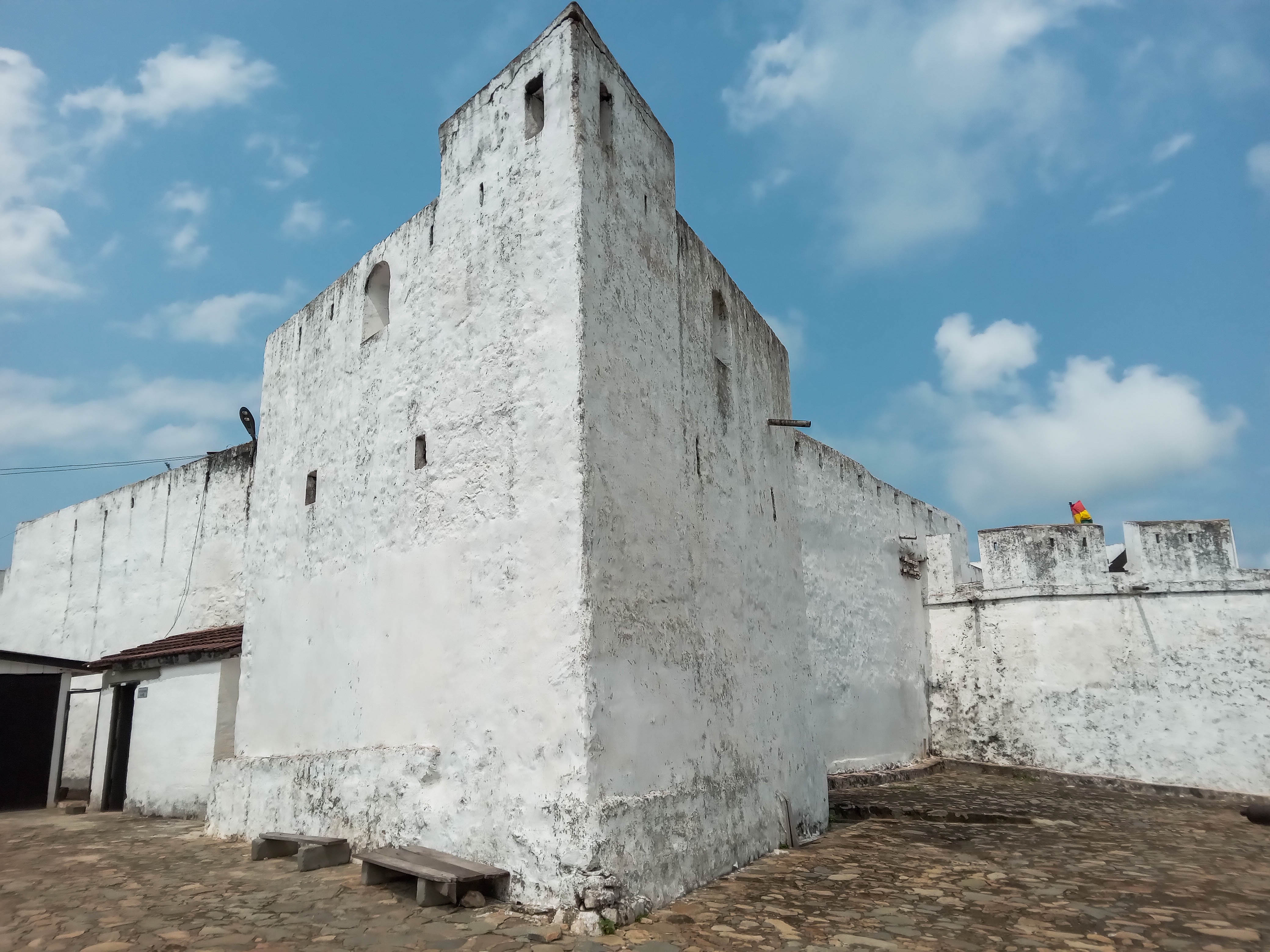
Fort Metal Cross in Ghana

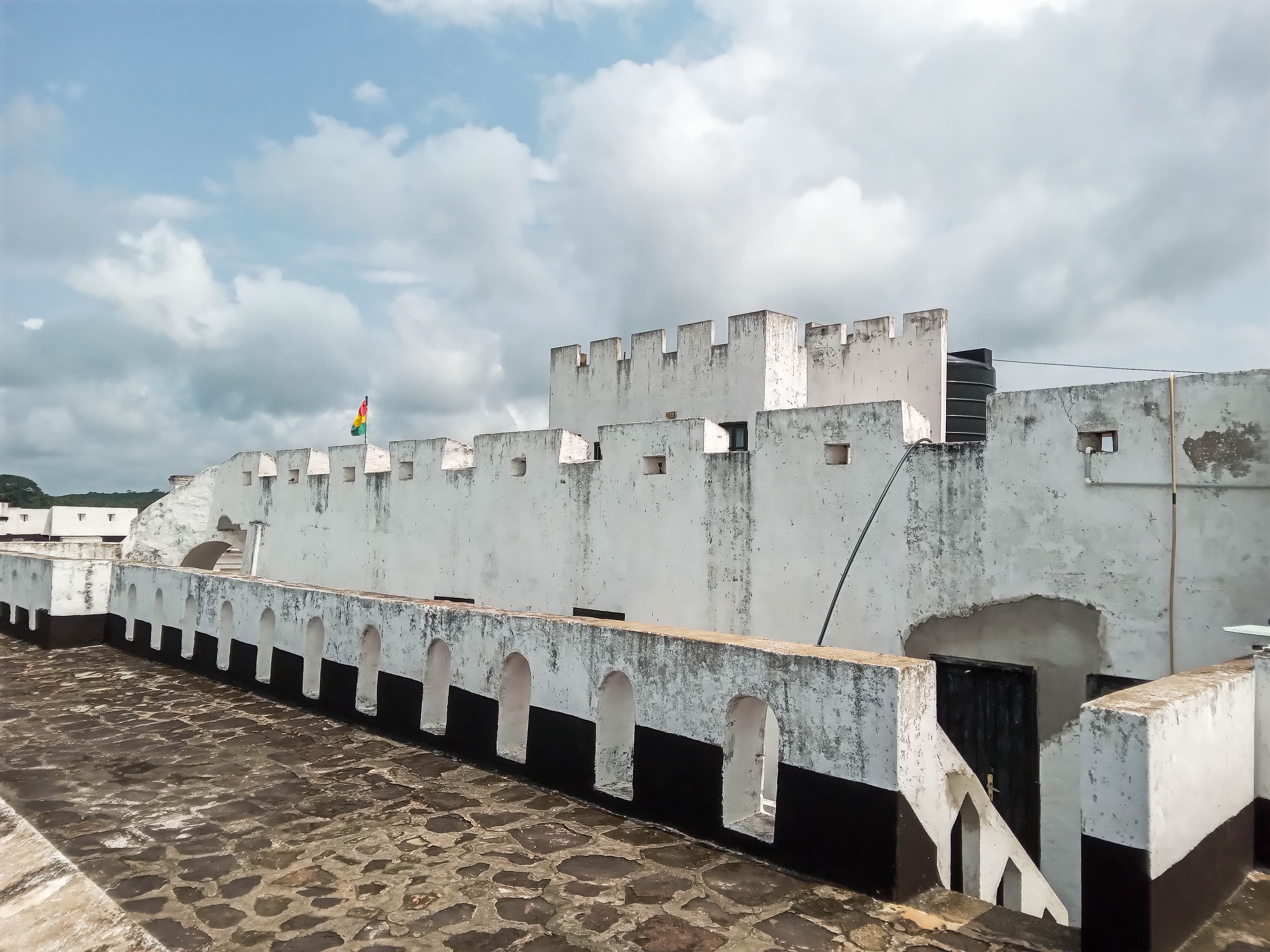
Fort Metal Cross in Ghana
