= George Webster (painter) =

English painter

George Webster was an English painter who specialised in marine art. He toured extensively and painted seascapes of the places he visited. His work was exhibited at the Royal Society of British Artists and the Royal Academy.

== Career ==
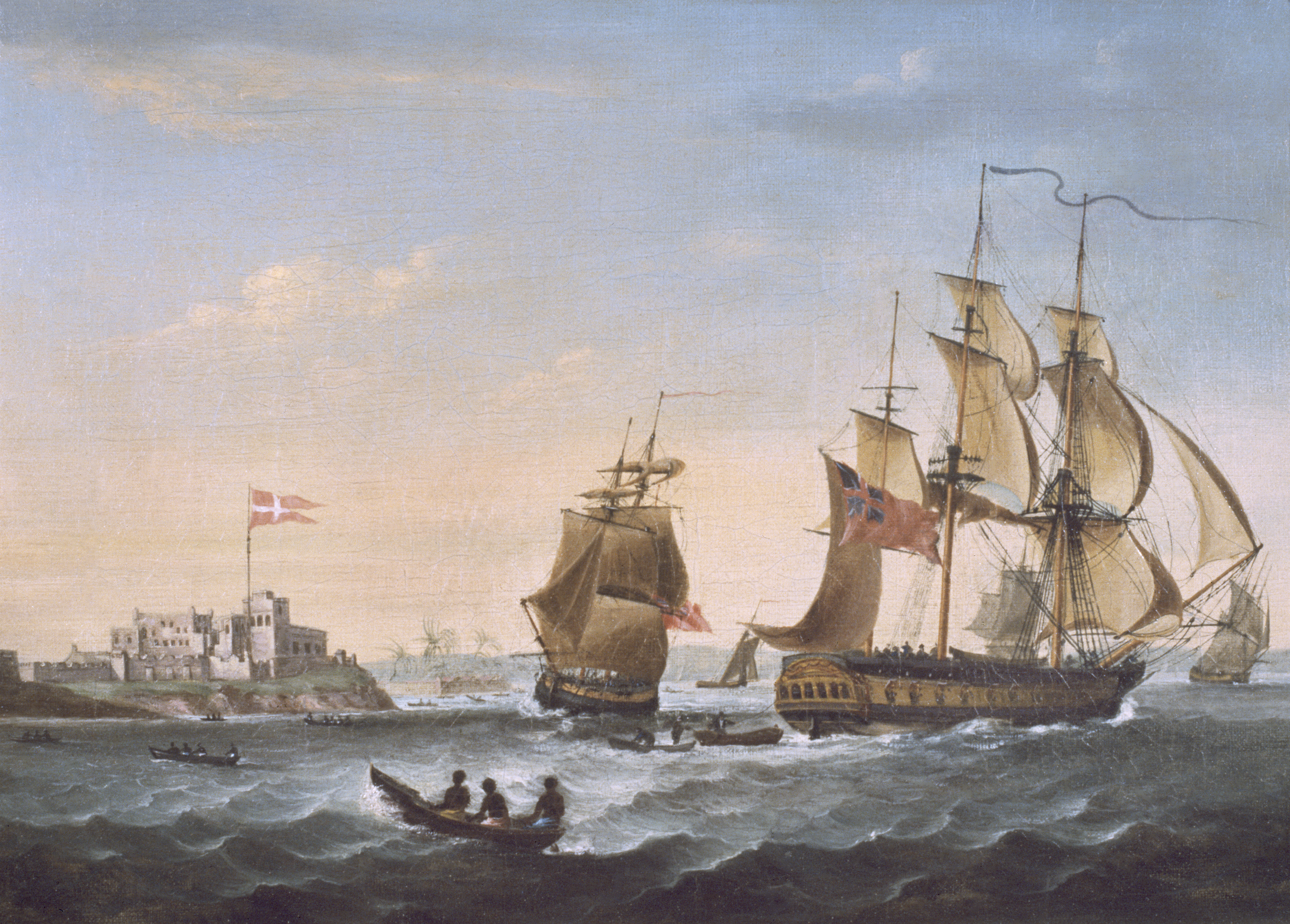
Painting by Webster of two British slave ships taking on board slaves off Fort Christiansborg

Webster was active between the years of 1797 and 1832.

=== Style ===
Webster was a 19th-century artist who painted in the British Marine art style. He painted seascapes and ship portraits with versatility allowing him to capture both rivers, such as the Thames, and calm or stormy open waters. His work was influenced by the Dutch style and stood in some cases as a historical record as well as attractive sea art.

=== Touring ===
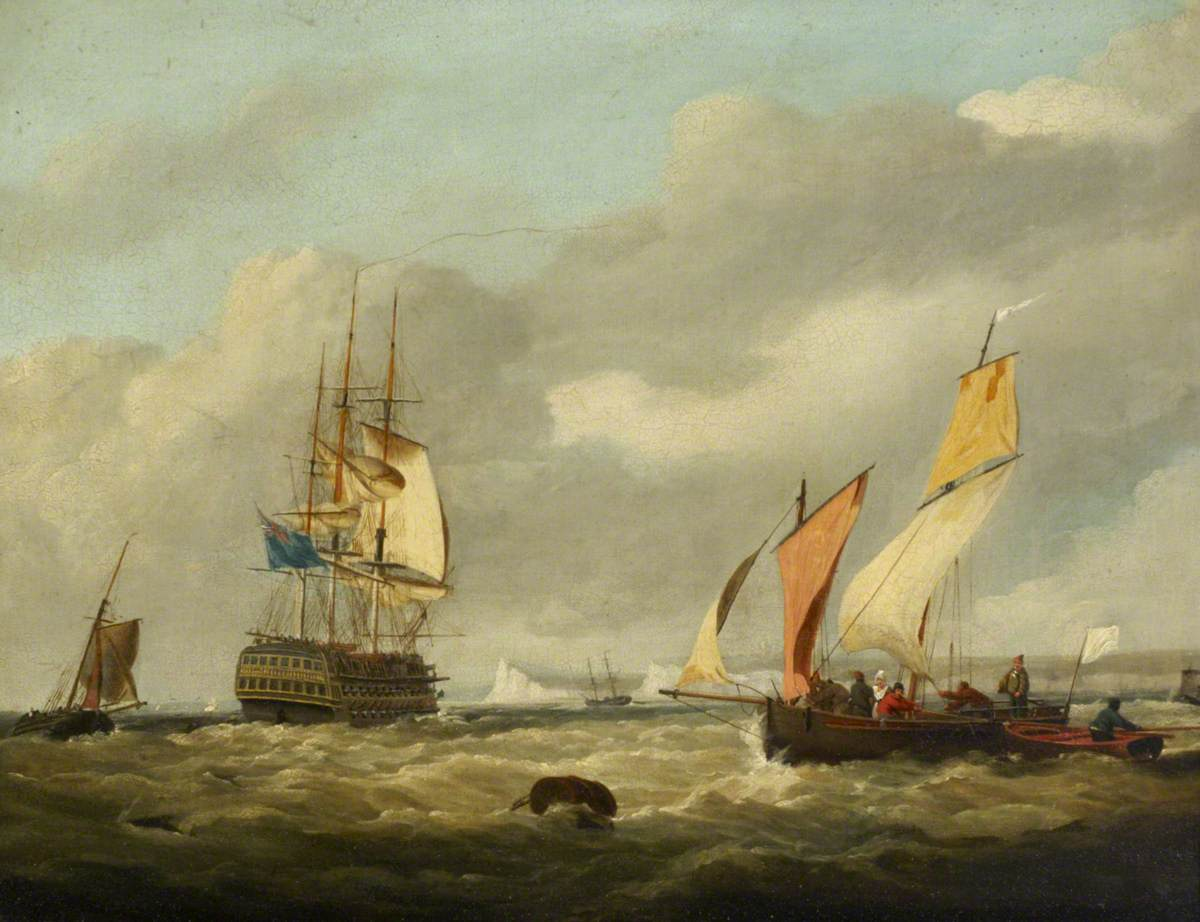
A French Lugger

In 1797, he started showing his paintings at galleries in London. His work was on show at the Royal Society of British Artists, the British Institution and the Royal Academy.

Webster toured extensively and painted the seascapes upon which he travelled. Between 1803 and 1806 he toured Africa. He visited the Slave Coast of West Africa and painted a seascape showing two British slave ships taking on board slaves at Fort Christiansborg. The painting is held by the Danish Maritime Museum. Webster drew a depiction of Fort Metal Cross in modern-day Ghana. It is not known whether Webster travelled to Africa in any official capacity.

=== Publisher ===
Webster also published engravings. These included one of Captain James Lawrence of the United States frigate Chesapeake who died while engaged with the British ship Shannon on the first of June 1813. Webster remarked, "This Print is respectfully dedicated to the British Nation whose philanthropy is such as to esteem the Brave and Virtuous even in an Enemy."

== Selected works ==
=== The Battle of Lissa ===
Webster painted at least two pictures of the Battle of Lissa (1811). Engravings of the pictures are held by the UK government at its British Embassy in Zagreb.

=== A Two Decker leaving Portsmouth ===
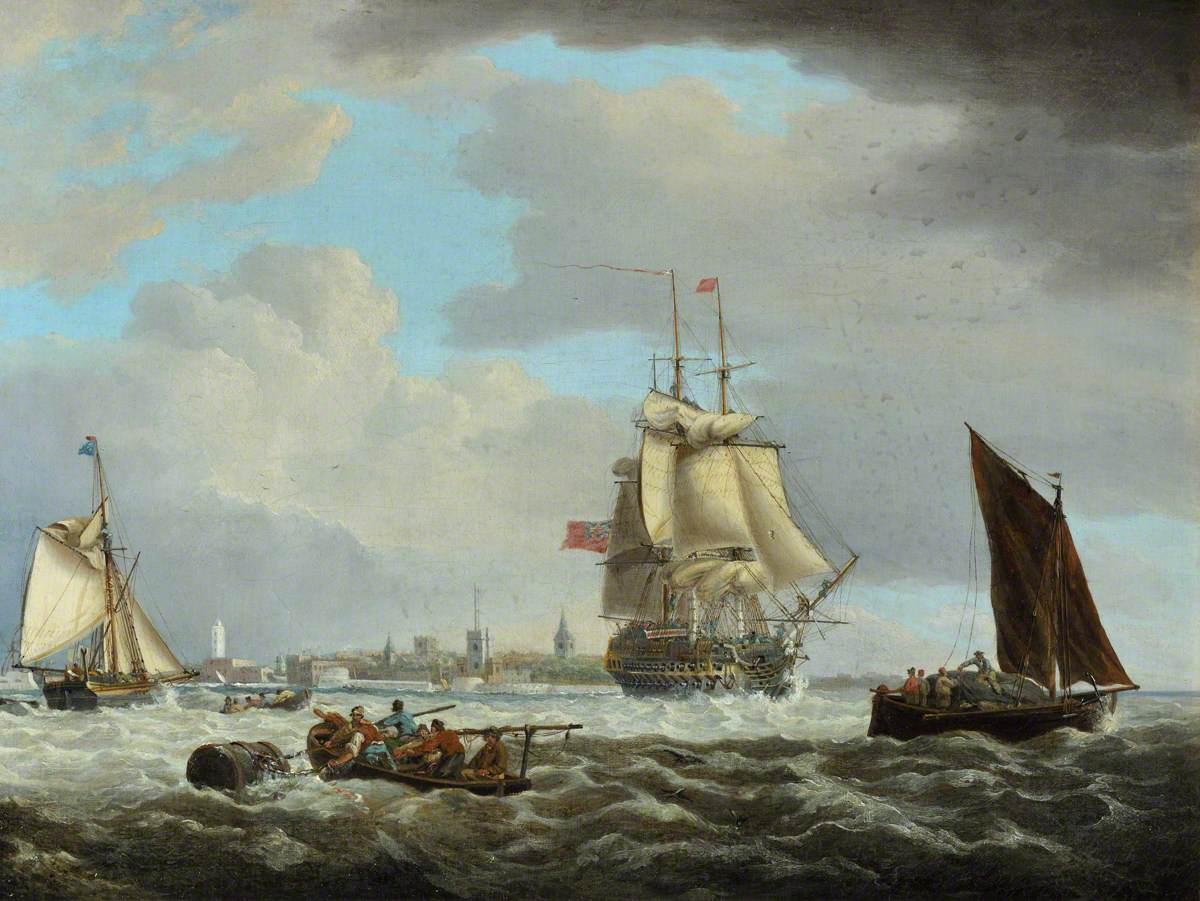
A Two Decker leaving Portsmouth

The painting is oil on canvas and framed, it is owned by the Royal Museum Greenwich.

=== A French Lugger ===
A French Lugger and a Ship in The Downs is owned by the National Maritime Museum in Greenwich, London.

=== HMS Bonne Citoyenne and Furieuse ===
A painting that depicts a ship battle taking place on 6 July 1809. Bonne Citoyenne is firing her cannons at Furieuse, whose mast is broken.

=== Old Portsmouth Harbour ===
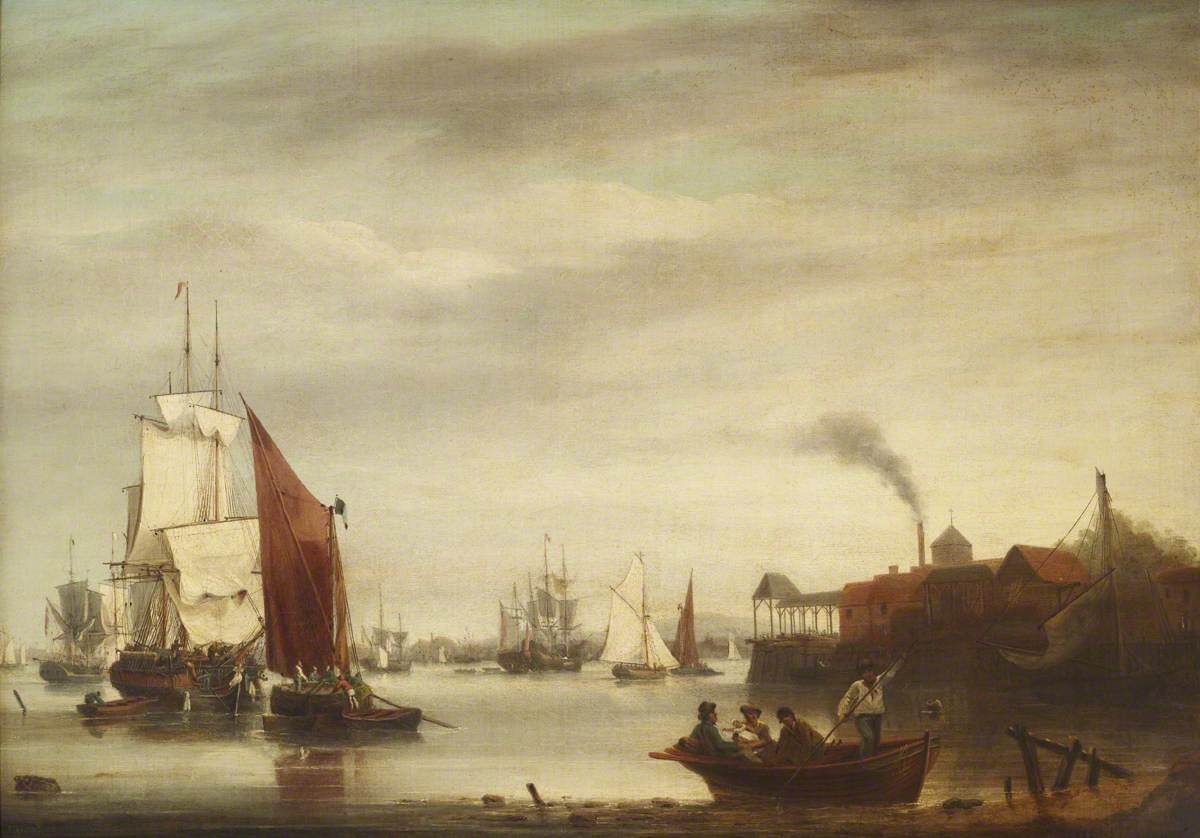
Old Portsmouth Harbour

This painting depicts the harbour at Portsmouth in England. It is held by The National Trust at Anglesey Abbey in Cambridgeshire.

=== A Frigate and other Vessels ===
This painting is held by The National Trust at Hanbury Hall in Worcestershire. The painting is oil on canvas and was bought from the estate of Frederick Horton who formerly lived at Shrawley Wood House in London.

== Sources ==
- Brook-Hart, Denys (1978). British 19th century marine painting. UK: Antique Collectors Club.
- Tracy, Nicholas (2007). Britannia's Palette. UK: McGill-Queen’s University Press.
