= Dixcove =

- Village
- Location of Dixcove in Western Region, Southern Ghana
- Coordinates: 4°48′N 1°57′W
- Country: Ghana
- Region: Western Region
- District: Ahanta West District
- Elevation: 15 m (49 ft)

Population (2013)
  - Total: —
- Time zone: GMT
  - Summer (DST): GMT

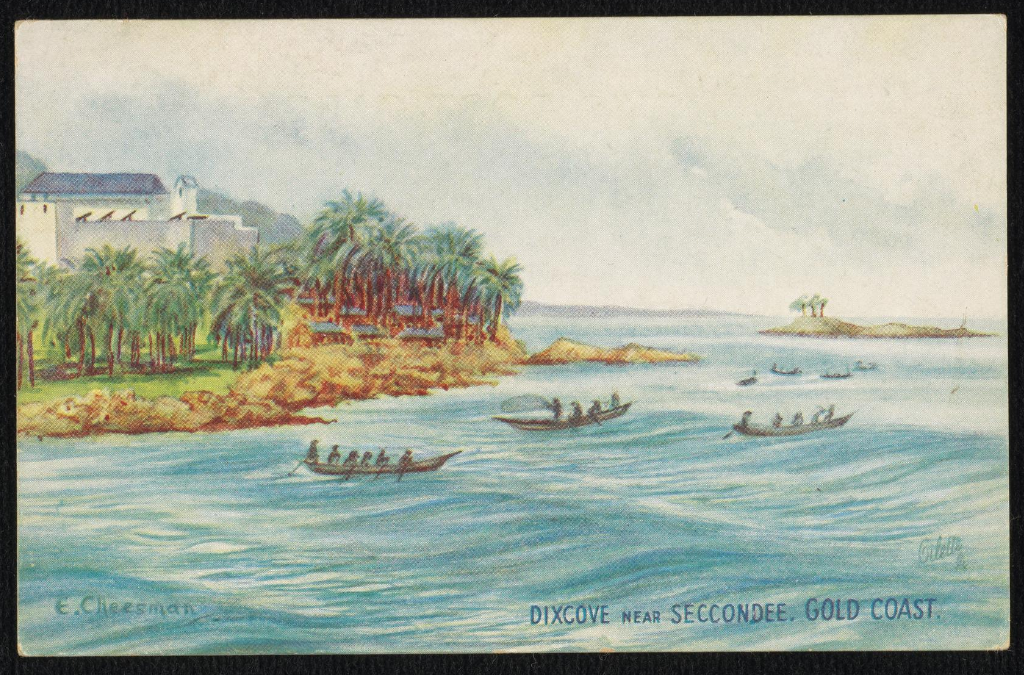
A painting by Edith Cheeseman from the 1920s, later printed as a postcard, including an image of Fort Metal Cross and the harbour of Dixcove.

Dixcove is a coastal village and a fishing community in the Ahanta West district, a district in the Western Region of South Ghana, located approximately 35 km west of the regional capital of Sekondi-Takoradi. The current Paramount Chief of Upper Dixcove is Obrempong Hima Dekyi XIV.

== History ==
Dixcove is the site of Fort Metal Cross, an English-built fort which was completed in 1698. The fort dominates the fishing village and town from a bluff located on the eastern side of the village. The fort was used mainly as a slave fort, but also served as a secure depot for the trade gold and palm oil, and later served as a prison, police station, and a post office. The fort is currently leased by an English citizen who operates it as a tourist site, and a congregation point for local churches.

The town was a center for trade during the Gold Coast era. From the early 17th to the 19th century, Dixcove was divided into two quarters known as Ntwarkro (Upper Dixcove) and Daazikessie (Lower Dixcove). Land disputes between rival chiefs led to violence between residents of Upper Dixcove and Lower Dixcove in 2020 and 2022.

Development of infrastructure in Upper and Lower Dixcove is funded by the sale of pre-mixed fuel sales to fishermen. In 2022, the Paramount Chief Obrempong Hima Dekyi XIV expressed concerns that a recent rise in crime could affect the availability of these funds and delay road and structure repairs.

== Sports ==
In 2024, Dixcove F.C. won the first Ahanta Sportyfest competition, a tournament designed to showcase youth sports talent in the Ahanta West district.

== Institutions ==
- Dixcove Government Hospital
- Dixcove Fort

== See also ==
- Kundum Festival
