= Lee Elementary School =

Lee Elementary School may refer to:

== Lee Elementary ==
- Lee Elementary School, Springdale Public Schools, Springdale, Arkansas, USA
- Lee Elementary School, Los Alamitos Unified School District, Los Alamitos, Orange County, California, USA
- Lee Elementary School of Technology / World Studies, Tampa, Florida, USA
- Lee Elementary School, Lee, Florida, USA; in Madison County Schools
- Lee Elementary School, Manhattan–Ogden USD 383, Riley County, Kansas, USA
- Lee Elementary School, Lee, Massachusetts, USA; in Berkshire County
- Lee Elementary School (Canby, Oregon), USA
- Lee Elementary School, Salem-Keizer School District, Marion County, Oregon, USA
- Lee Elementary School, Abilene Independent School District, Abilene, Texas, USA
- Lee Elementary School, Caddo Mills Independent School District, Caddo Mills, Texas, USA
- Lee Elementary School, Coppell, Texas, USA; a closed school whose building is now used for New Tech High School at Coppell
- Lee Elementary School, Cypress-Fairbanks Independent School District, Harris County, Texas, USA
- Lee Elementary School, El Paso Independent School District, El Paso, Texas, USA
- Lee Elementary School, Grand Prairie, Texas, USA; in Grand Prairie Independent School District
- Lee Elementary School, Irving Independent School District, Irving, Texas, USA

== Short form "Lee Elementary" ==
- Adelaide Lee Elementary School, Capitol Hill, Oklahoma City, Oklahoma, USA
- B D Lee Elementary School, Gaffney, South Carolina, USA; in Cherokee County School District
- C.C. Lee Elementary School, Aberdeen, South Dakota, USA; in Aberdeen School District
- George Lee Elementary School, Regina Public Schools, Regina, Saskatchewan, Canada
- James Lee Elementary School, Fairfax County Public Schools, Virginia, USA
- Jessie Lee Elementary School, Surrey School District, Surrey, British Columbia, Canada
- Richard Henry Lee Elementary School, Glen Burnie, Anne Arundel County, Maryland, USA; in Anne Arundel County Public Schools
- Robert Lee Elementary School, Robert Lee Independent School District, Robert Lee, Texas, USA
- Robert E. Lee Elementary School (disambiguation)
- Russell Lee Elementary School, Austin Independent School District, Austin, Texas, USA
- Seaborn Lee Elementary School, South Fulton, Georgia, USA; in Fulton County Public Schools
- Walter Lee Elementary School, Richmond School District, Richmond, British Columbia, Canada
- Will L. Lee Elementary School, Richmond Community Schools, Richmond, Michigan, USA

== See also ==
- Ashby-Lee Elementary School, Quicksburg, Shenandoah County, Virginia, USA
- Brunson-Lee Elementary School, Balsz Elementary School District, Phoenix, Arizona, USA
- Central Lee Elementary School, Central Lee Community School District, Lee County, Iowa, USA
- Fort Lee Elementary Schools 1/2/3/4, Fort Lee School District, Fort Lee, Bergen County, New Jersey, USA
- Newton-Lee Elementary School, Ashburn, Virginia, USA; in Loudoun County Public Schools
- North Lee Elementary School, Bradley County Schools, Bradley County, Tennessee, USA
- Upson-Lee Elementary School, Thomaston, Georgia, USA; in Upson County
- Lee School (disambiguation)
- Lee Middle School (disambiguation)
- Lee High School (disambiguation)
