= Jason Lee Middle School =

Jason Lee Middle School may refer to:

- Jason Lee Middle School (Vancouver), Washington, U.S.
- Jason Lee Middle School (Tacoma), Washington, U.S.

== See also ==
- Lee School (disambiguation)
- Lee Middle School (disambiguation)
