= List of Lee High School Mascots =

While there are several high schools in the United States named for, after, or similar to Robert E. Lee, the athletic mascots of these schools vary. Below is a list of the schools and their mascots.

== Robert E. Lee High Schools ==
- Robert E. Lee High School (Baytown, Texas) - Gander

=== Former ===
The following were all formerly named Robert E. Lee High School. Mascots may have changed since renaming occurred.

- Dr. Percy L. Julian High School (Montgomery, Alabama) - Formerly Generals, now Phoenix
- John R. Lewis High School (Springfield, Virginia) - Lancer
- Legacy High School (Midland, Texas) - Rebels
- Legacy of Educational Excellence High School (San Antonio, Texas) - Volunteers
- Margaret Long Wisdom High School (Houston, Texas) - Generals
- Riverside High School (Jacksonville, Florida) - Generals
- Staunton High School (Staunton, Virginia) - Formerly The Fighting Leemen, now the Staunton Storm
- Tyler Legacy High School (Tyler, Texas) - Red Raiders

== Robert Lee High Schools ==
- Robert Lee High School (Robert Lee, Texas) - Steers

== Lee High Schools ==
- Lee Academy (Bishopville, South Carolina), formerly Robert E. Lee Academy - Cavaliers
- Lee High School (Huntsville, Alabama) - Generals
- Lee High School (Lee County, Virginia) - Generals
- Upson-Lee High School (Thomaston, Georgia), formerly Robert E. Lee High School - Knights
- Lee High School (Wyoming, Michigan) - Former Rebels, now Legends

== Lee County High Schools ==
- Lee County High School (Leesburg, Georgia) - Trojans
