= Robert E. Lee High School =

Robert E. Lee High School may refer to:

== Schools currently named Robert E. Lee High School ==
- Robert E. Lee High School (Baytown, Texas)

== Schools formerly named Robert E. Lee High School ==
- John R. Lewis High School (Fairfax County, Virginia)
- Liberty Magnet High School (Baton Rouge, Louisiana)
- Legacy of Educational Excellence High School (San Antonio, Texas)
- Margaret Long Wisdom High School (Houston, Texas)
- Dr. Percy L. Julian High School (Montgomery, Alabama)
- Staunton High School (Staunton, Virginia)
- Legacy High School (Midland, Texas)
- Tyler Legacy High School (Tyler, Texas)
- Lee Academy (South Carolina) (Bishopville, South Carolina)
- Upson-Lee High School, (Thomaston, Georgia)
- Riverside High School (Florida) (Jacksonville, Florida)

== See also ==
- Lee High School (disambiguation)
- Lee County High School (disambiguation)
- Robert Lee High School, Robert Lee, Texas
