= Lee Middle School =

Lee Middle School may refer to:

== Long-form: Lee Middle School ==
- Lee Middle School (Woodland, California), in Woodland Joint Unified School District (California), USA
- Lee Middle School, School District of Lee County (Florida), USA
- Lee Middle School (Coweta County), Georgia, USA; in Sharpsburg in the Coweta County School System
- Lee Middle School campus of Hunt High School, Columbus, Mississippi, USA

== Short-form: Lee Middle School ==
- Cedar Lee Middle School, Fauquier County, Virginia, USA
- Colonel E. Brooke Lee Middle School, Montgomery County Public Schools; in Kemp Mill, Montgomery County, Maryland, USA
- Electa Arcott Lee Middle School, School District of Manatee County, Manatee County, Florida, USA
- Gordon Lee Middle School, Chickamauga City Schools, Chickamauga, Walker County, Georgia, USA
- Jason Lee Middle School (disambiguation)
- Robert E. Lee Middle School, several memorials to Robert E. Lee schools that have been renamed
  - Robert E. Lee Middle School, College Park (Orlando), Florida, USA
- Upson-Lee Middle School, Thomaston-Upson County School District; in Upson County, Georgia, USA

== See also ==
- West Lee Middle School, East Lee Middle School, SanLee Middle School; Lee County middle schools in Sanford, North Carolina. USA
- Central Lee Middle School, Central Lee Community School District, Lee County, Iowa, USA
- Fort Lee Middle School, Fort Lee School District, Fort Lee, Bergen County, New Jersey. USA
- Lee High School (disambiguation)
- Lee Elementary School (disambiguation)
- Lee School (disambiguation)
- Lee (disambiguation)
