= Fort Lee High School =

High school in Bergen County, New Jersey, US

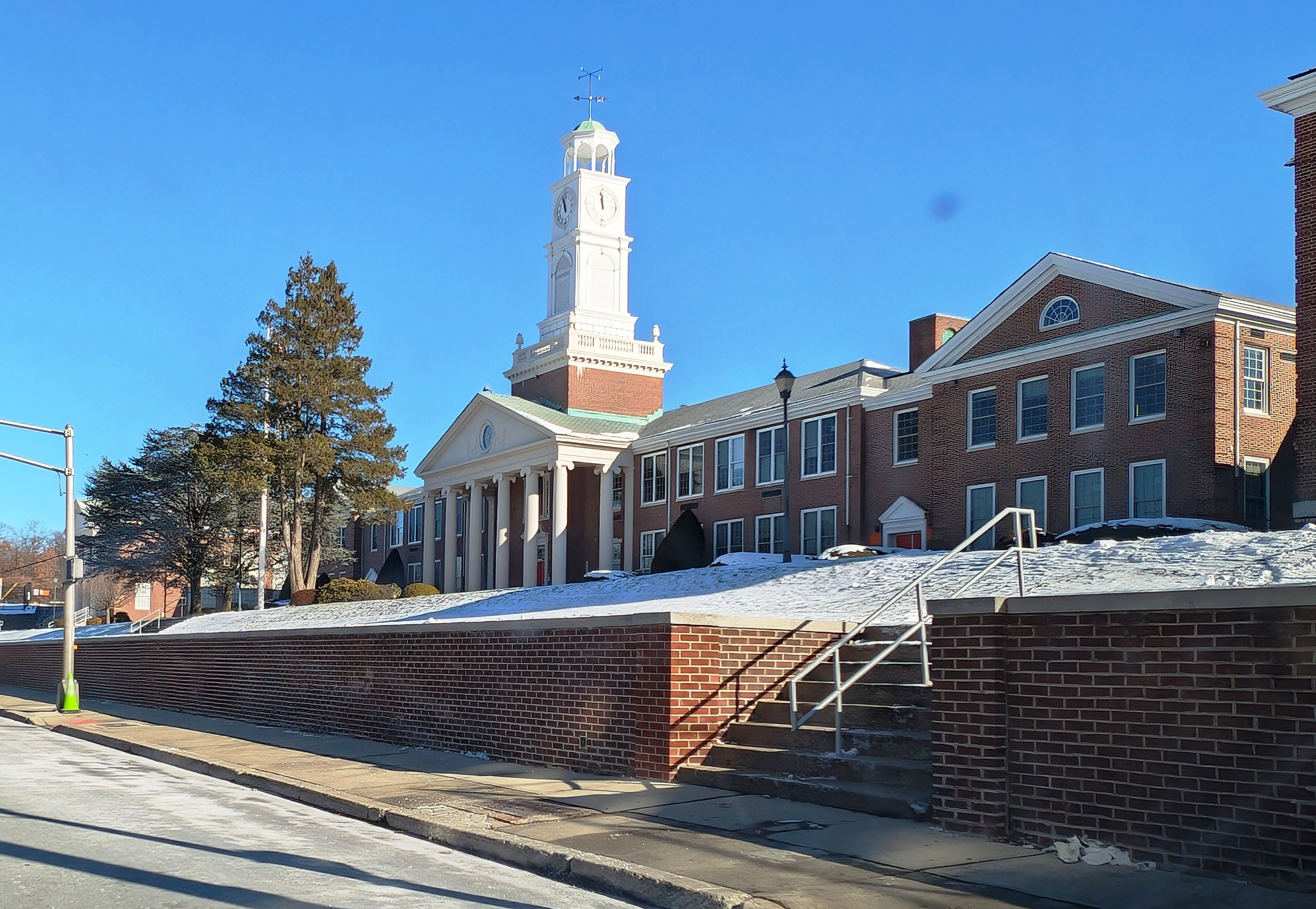

Location
- 3000 Lemoine Avenue; Fort Lee, Bergen County, New Jersey 07024; United States; 40°51′30″N 73°57′56″W

Information
- Type: Public high school
- Established: 1916
- NCES School ID: 340531000442
- Principal: Lauren Glynn
- Faculty: 87.0 FTEs
- Grades: 9–12
- Enrollment: 1,170 (as of 2024–25)
- Student to teacher ratio: 13.5:1
- Colors: Orange and Black
- Athletics conference: Big North Conference (general); North Jersey Super Football Conference (football)
- Team name: Bridgemen
- Newspaper: Fort Leeder
- Yearbook: Pioneer
- Website: flhs.flboe.com

Fort Lee High School is a four-year comprehensive public high school that serves students in ninth through twelfth grade, located in Fort Lee, in Bergen County, in the U.S. state of New Jersey, operating as the lone secondary school of the Fort Lee School District. The school has been accredited by the Middle States Association of Colleges and Schools Commission on Elementary and Secondary Schools since 1931.

As of the 2024–25 school year, the school had an enrollment of 1,170 students and 87.0 classroom teachers (on an FTE basis), for a student–teacher ratio of 13.5:1. There were 278 students (23.8% of enrollment) eligible for free lunch and 54 (4.6% of students) eligible for reduced-cost lunch.

== History ==
Fort Lee High School was established in 1916. It was relocated to its current location in 1928. A new wing was added in 1964 and new classrooms were constructed in 1968. The school was completely renovated in the 1980s.

In March 2009, a scandal concerning the transcript records of the students was alleged. Raymond Bandlow, the superintendent of schools, reported that transcripts of students from 2003 to the current senior class had been tampered with. The Fort Lee Board of Education conducted an investigation and attempted to ascertain as to who exactly was involved after it was reported that in some instances, grades were changed, and in others low grades were deleted. Students of the class of 2009 expressed their discontent and anger regarding the scandal, as these allegations could jeopardize their chances of being admitted to colleges.

== Awards, recognition and rankings ==
In the 2011 "Ranking America's High Schools" issue by The Washington Post, the school was ranked 52nd in New Jersey and 1,611th nationwide. In 2006, the school was ranked 217th out of the top 1000 High Schools in the United States by Newsweek magazine.

The school was the 81st-ranked public high school in New Jersey out of 339 schools statewide in New Jersey Monthly magazine's September 2014 cover story on the state's "Top Public High Schools," using a new ranking methodology. The school had been ranked 97th in the state of 328 schools in 2012, after being ranked 72nd in 2010 out of 322 schools listed. The magazine ranked the school 75th in 2008 out of 316 schools. The school was ranked 99th in the magazine's September 2006 issue, which included 316 schools across the state.

Schooldigger.com ranked the school tied for 137th out of 381 public high schools statewide in its 2011 rankings (an increase of 1 positions from the 2010 ranking) which were based on the combined percentage of students classified as proficient or above proficient on the mathematics (85.6%) and language arts literacy (93.2%) components of the High School Proficiency Assessment (HSPA).

Fort Lee High School was ranked 55th out of 426 schools in New Jersey by U.S. News & World Report on its 2018 listing of "Best High Schools". In 2021, U.S. News & World Report ranked the school 106th among high schools in New Jersey, 264th in the New York City metropolitan area and 2320th nationwide.

== Athletics ==
The Fort Lee High School Bridgemen compete in the Big North Conference which is comprised of public and private high schools in Bergen and Passaic counties, and was established following a reorganization of sports leagues in Northern New Jersey made under the supervision of the New Jersey State Interscholastic Athletic Association (NJSIAA). Prior to the 2010 realignment, the team participated in the Bergen County Scholastic League (BCSL) American Conference, comprised of public and private high schools located in Bergen County and Hudson County. With 681 students in grades 10-12, the school was classified by the NJSIAA for the 2019–20 school year as Group II for most athletic competition purposes, which included schools with an enrollment of 486 to 758 students in that grade range. The football team competes in the Ivy Red division of the North Jersey Super Football Conference, which includes 112 schools competing in 20 divisions, making it the nation's biggest football-only high school sports league. The football team is one of the 12 programs assigned to the two Ivy divisions starting in 2020, which are intended to allow weaker programs ineligible for playoff participation to compete primarily against each other. The school was classified by the NJSIAA as Group III North for football for 2024–2026, which included schools with 700 to 884 students.

The boys' basketball team won the Group I state championship in 1947 (defeating Dunellen High School in the tournament final) and 1949 (vs. Wildwood High School). In front of a crowd of 2,500 spectators at the Elizabeth Armory, the 1947 team upset Dunellen, winning the Group I championship with a 39-34 victory. Trailing for most of the game, the 1949 team pulled ahead of Wildwood in the fourth quarter to win the Group I state title by a score of 49-44.

The boys track team won the Group II spring / outdoor track state championship in 1963.

The wrestling team won the North I Group II state sectional title in 1980.

The girls volleyball team won the Group II state championship in 1988, defeating Garfield High School in the final match of the playoff tournament.

In 2011, Nancie Sophias broke the school record for the 800m that had been set in 1977 and became the high school's first woman to qualify for the NJSIAA State Track Meet of Champions in the event.

The varsity boys tennis team was top-seeded in the North II, Group II state sectional tournament, but lost in the semifinals 3–2 to James Caldwell High School.

The school's marching band was Class VA national champion in 2023 with a score of 95.40.

== Clubs ==
Clubs at the school include art, theatre, the school chorus, the debating society and the school newspaper. The Fort Lee High School Band was the Tournament of Bands Atlantic Coast Invitational Class A winners in Group 4 in 2019 and 2021.

== Administration ==
The school's principal is Lauren Glynn. Her administration team includes two assistant principals.

== Notable faculty ==
- Joan Voss (born 1940), politician, was on the school's faculty from 1963 until she retired in 2001

== Notable alumni ==
- Allan Arkush (born 1948), director / producer of films, television and videos
- Jonathan Cheban (born 1974, class of 1991), reality television star and entrepreneur noted for his recurring role on his reality-TV show Keeping Up with the Kardashians and its spinoffs
- Lynn Yamada Davis (1956–2024), celebrity chef and TikToker
- Allan Domb (born 1955), real estate developer and politician
- Randy Klein (born 1949), musician, composer, pianist, author and educator
- Jack Langer (born 1948/49, class of 1967), former basketball player and investment banker
- Michael Levine (born 1956), writer and public relations expert
- Ted Manakas (born 1951), former professional basketball player for the Kansas City-Omaha Kings
- John Orsino (1938–2016), Major League Baseball catcher who played for the San Francisco Giants (1961–1962), Baltimore Orioles (1963–1965) and Washington Senators (1966–1967)
- Lorraine Shemesh (class of 1967), artist whose work focuses on painting and drawing
- Jenn Sherman (born 1969), fitness instructor who was the very first cycling instructor hired at Peloton Interactive
- Peggy Siegal (born 1947), entertainment publicist
- Mark Sokolich (born 1963, class of 1981), mayor of Fort Lee
- Glen Zipper (born 1972), writer, film producer and former New Jersey assistant state prosecutor
