= Godfrey-Lee Public Schools =

School district in Michigan

Address
- 1414 Burton Street SW Wyoming, Kent County, Michigan, 49509; United States

District information
- Grades: Pre-Kindergarten-12
- Superintendent: Arnetta Thompson
- Schools: 5
- Budget: $42,823,000 2022-2023 expenditures
- NCES District ID: 2616080

Students and staff
- Students: 1,660 (2024-2025)
- Teachers: 99.9 (on an FTE basis) (2024-2025)
- Staff: 243.61 FTE (2024-2025)
- Student–teacher ratio: 16.62 (2024-2025)

Other information
- Website: www.godfrey-lee.org

Godfrey-Lee Public Schools is a public school district in the Grand Rapids, Michigan area. It serves part of the city of Wyoming and, at 1.4 square miles, is the smallest district in Michigan by land area.

== History ==
The first school in the northeast area of Wyoming was built in 1857. In 1894, Godfrey Street School was built on the site of the current Godfrey Elementary. Ninth and tenth grades were added in 1909. To ease overcrowding there, Lee Street High School, later known as Lee High School, was built in 1923. A new wing was added in 1926.

A 1949 article in the Grand Rapids Press discussed the possibility of annexing the district into Grand Rapids Public Schools and included photographs of the district's two schools, Lee High School and Godfrey School. At the time, Grand Rapids was annexing several neighboring districts. According to Grand Rapids Public Schools business manager H. P. Herrinton, “Grand Rapids is not interested in operating (Godfrey-Lee Public Schools) from a financial standpoint. It is not a rich district.”

The district prospered independently. In 1950, Godfrey School's replacement was being planned, along with new additions to Lee High School that included a gymnasium. The high school woodworking class used the blueprints to make scale models to illustrate the buildings to the community. Construction began in 1959 on another addition to the high school.

The Early Childhood Center opened in fall 1999. A bond issue was passed in 2020 that included renovations and expansions at Lee High School, completed in fall 2023.

Lee High School sports teams had called themselves the "Lee Rebels" since 1936. In 2019, the district sought to distance itself from any association with Robert E. Lee and the Confederate States Army by changing its mascot to the Legends. The Native American Heritage Fund donated funds to help with the costs of rebranding, such as new signage, because as then-superintendent Kevin Polston said, "While Rebels does not disparage Native Americans, any component of an organization that is harmful to its community is worthy of funding consideration." In March 2020, the district unveiled its current dragon logo.

== Schools ==
Schools in Godfrey-Lee Public Schools district
School	Address	Notes
Lee High School	1335 Lee Street, SW Wyoming	Grades 9–12. Built 1923.
Lee Middle School	1335 Lee Street, SW Wyoming	Grades 6–8. Shares a building with Lee High School.
East Lee Campus	982 Lee Street, SW Wyoming	Alternative/Online education
Godfrey Elementary	1920 Godfrey Street, SW Wyoming	Grades 3-5. Built 1950.
Early Childhood Center	961 Joosten Street, SW Wyoming	Grades PreK-2. Built 1999.
