= Michael Maggiano =

American lawyer

Michael Maggiano is an American personal injury attorney based in Bergen County, New Jersey.

== Biography ==
Maggiano attended the Chicago-Kent College of Law, graduating in 1974 and passing the bar the same year. From 1975, he served as Bergen County's first public defender until 1981. He also served as president of the New Jersey Trial Lawyers Association.

In 1988, he was elected as a Democrat to the Borough Council of Fort Lee, New Jersey. The same year, he became president elect of the state trial lawyers association promising to oppose a limitation in liability for auto insurance plans. In 1992, he chaired the relocation of the association's offices across from the State Capitol in Trenton. As a former councilman, he served as counsel to the city in demanding compensation from the Port Authority of New York and New Jersey for improvements related to the George Washington Bridge. He also joined with a partner, Christopher DiGirolamo, to found what would become New Jersey's Maggiano, DiGirolamo & Lizzi law firm.

In 2005, he was elected president of the Melvin Belli Society. At the time, he was described as one of the top trial lawyers of his generation in his state. He was also appointed to the New Jersey Public Broadcasting Authority board and New Jersey Monthly listed him as a top 100 super lawyer of New Jersey. This followed the Trial Attorneys of New Jersey presenting him with its 2004 Trial Bar Award. In 2007, a building he owned on Main Street in Fort Lee burned down.

In 2019, he led a class action against a surgical center that exposed patients to HIV the previous year.

In 2023, his wife of 47 years Alice died.
