= Lee High School =

Lee High School is the name of several high schools in the United States:

== Lee High School ==
- Lee High School (Huntsville, Alabama)
- Lee High School (Arkansas)
- Lee High School (Massachusetts)
- Lee High School (Wyoming, Michigan)
- Lee High School (Lee County, Virginia)

== Short form: Lee High School ==
- Robert E. Lee High School (disambiguation)
- Robert Lee High School, Robert Lee, Texas

== See also ==
- Southern Lee High School, Sanford, North Carolina
- Upson-Lee High School, Thomaston, Georgia
- Washington-Lee High School, Arlington, Virginia
- Lee School (disambiguation)
- Lee Middle School (disambiguation)
- Lee County High School (disambiguation)
