= Lee School =

Lee School can refer to:

- Lee School (Leesburg, Florida), USA
- Lee School (Montour, New York), USA
- Lee Elementary School (disambiguation)
- Lee Middle School (disambiguation)
- Lee High School (disambiguation)

== See also ==
- Lee County School District (disambiguation)
- Lee County Public Schools (disambiguation)
