= Lee County Public Schools =

Lee County Public Schools can refer to:

- Lee County Public Schools (North Carolina)
- Lee County Public Schools (Virginia)
- School District of Lee County, Florida

== See also ==
- Lee County School District (disambiguation)
- Lee School (disambiguation)
