= Robert E. Lee Elementary School =

There are numerous places named or previously named Robert E. Lee Elementary School. These include:

- Robert E. Lee Elementary School (Abilene, Texas), renamed Robert and Sammye Stafford Elementary School
- Robert E. Lee Elementary School (Amarillo, Texas), renamed Park Hills Elementary in 2019
- Robert E. Lee Elementary School (Austin, Texas), renamed Russell Lee Elementary in 2016
- Robert E. Lee Elementary School (Columbia, Missouri), renamed Locust Street Expressive Arts Elementary School in 2018
- Robert E. Lee Elementary School (Dallas, Texas (East Dallas)), renamed Geneva Heights Elementary School in 2018
- Robert E. Lee Elementary School (Denton, Texas), renamed Alexander Elementary School
- Robert E. Lee Elementary School (Durant, Oklahoma)
- Robert E. Lee Elementary School (Eagle Pass, Texas), renamed Juan N. Seguin Elementary School
- Robert E. Lee Elementary School (East Wenatchee, Washington), renamed Lee Elementary in 2018
- Robert E. Lee Elementary School (El Paso, Texas), renamed Sunrise Mountain Elementary School in 2020
- Robert E. Lee Elementary School (Grand Prairie, Texas), renamed Delmas Morton Elementary School
- Robert E. Lee Elementary School (Hugo, Oklahoma), renamed Hugo Elementary School
- Robert E. Lee Elementary School (Long Beach, California), renamed Oliva Nieto Herrara Elementary in 2016
- Robert E. Lee Elementary School (Marshall, Texas)
- Robert E. Lee Elementary School (Hampton, Virginia), closed in 2010
- Robert E. Lee Elementary School (Jackson, Mississippi), renamed Shirley Elementary School
- Robert E. Lee Elementary School (Richmond, Virginia)
- Robert E. Lee Elementary School (San Diego, California), renamed Pacific View Leadership Elementary in 2016
- Robert E. Lee Elementary School (Satsuma, Alabama), renamed Lee Elementary School
- Robert E. Lee Elementary School (Springdale, Arkansas), renamed Lee Elementary School
- Robert E. Lee Elementary School (Spotsylvania, Virginia), renamed Spotsylvania Elementary in 2021
- Robert E. Lee Elementary Magnet School of World Studies & Technology (Tampa, Florida)
- Robert E. Lee Elementary School (Tullahoma, Tennessee)
- Robert E. Lee Elementary School (Tulsa, Oklahoma), renamed Council Oaks Elementary School in 2018

== See also ==
- Lee-Jackson Elementary School (Mathews, Virginia)
- Robert Lee Elementary School, Robert Lee Independent School District (Robert Lee, Texas)
- Lee Elementary School (disambiguation)
