= Fort Lee, New Jersey =

Borough in Bergen County, New Jersey, US

- Borough
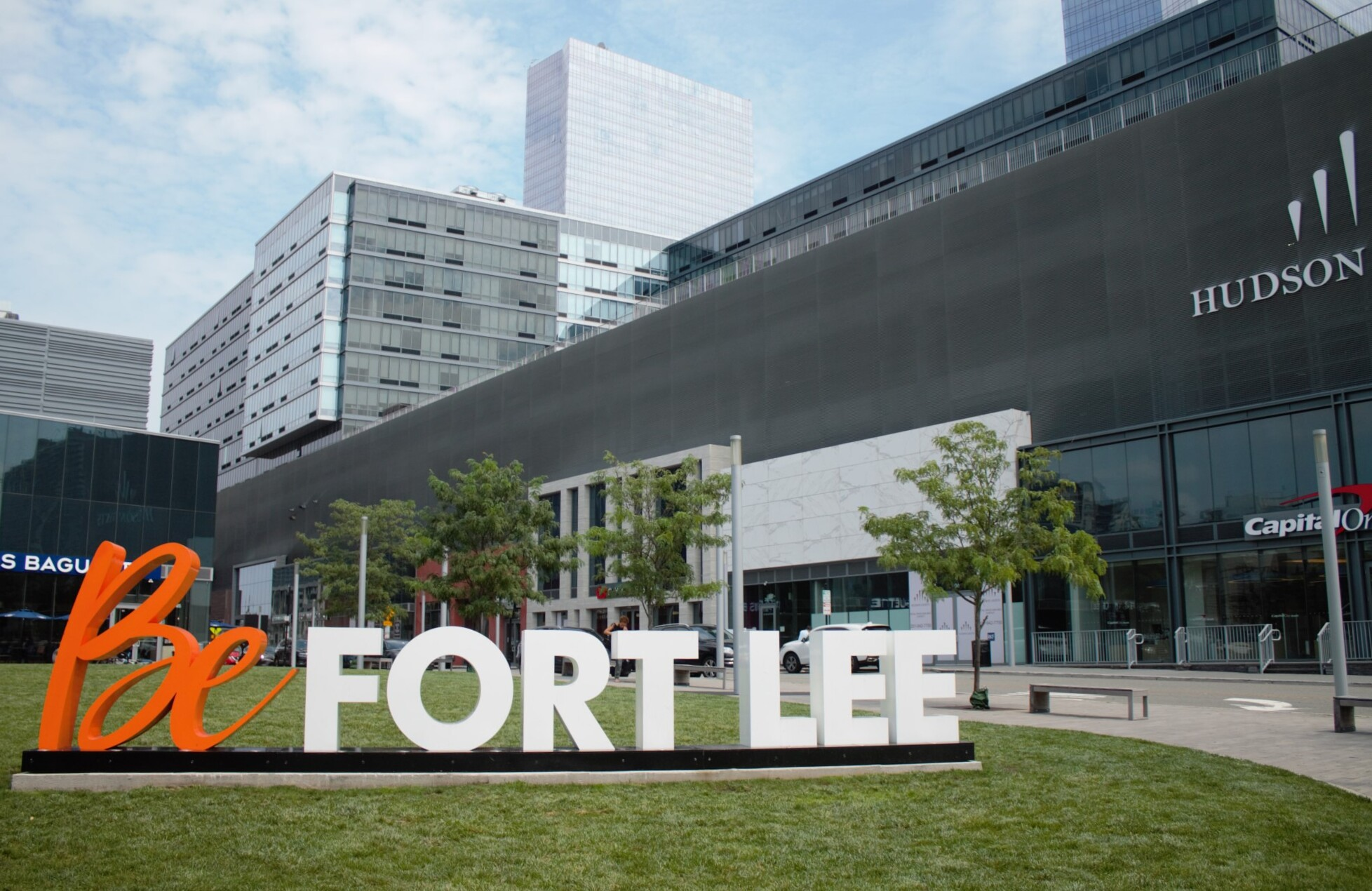
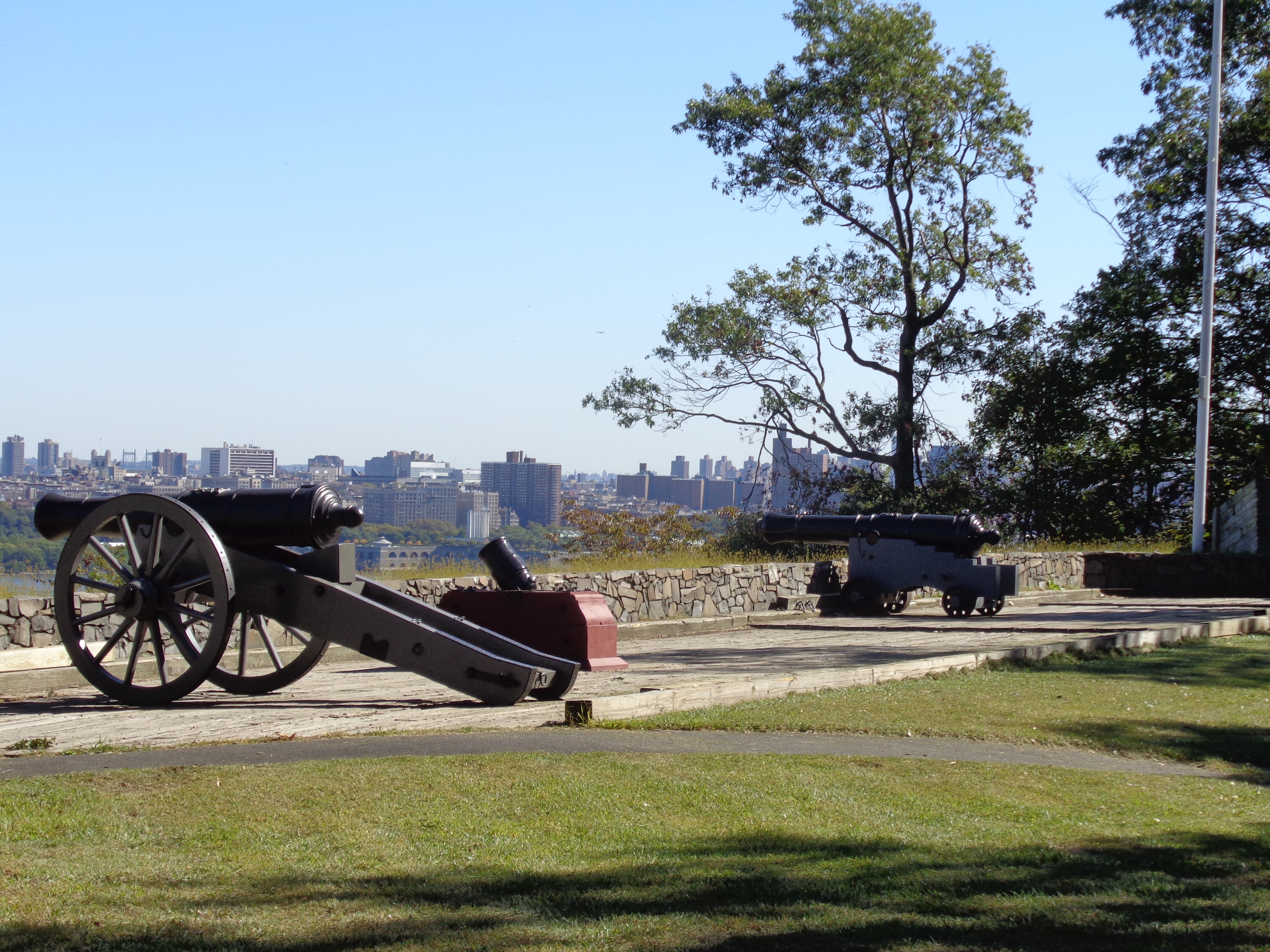
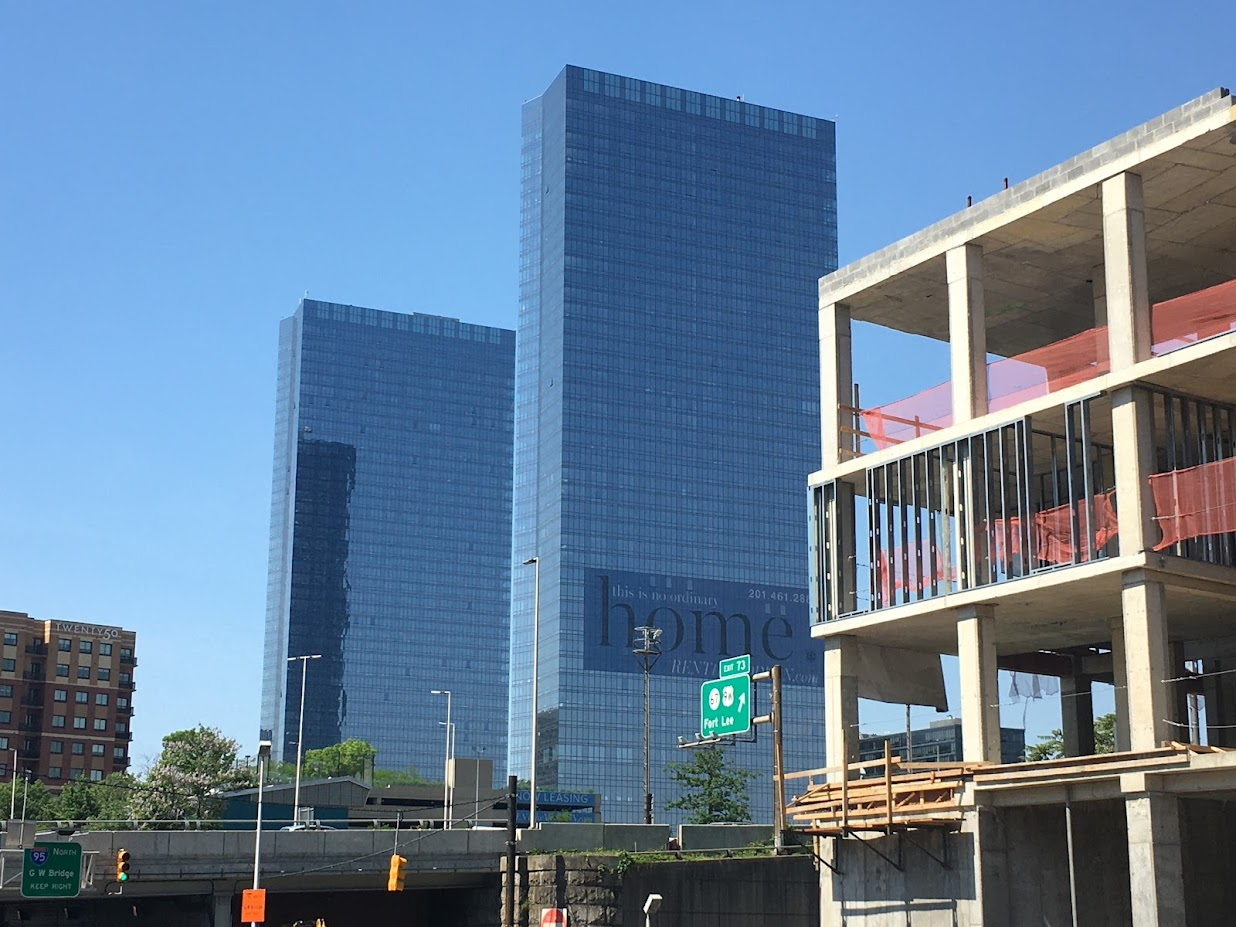
- Fort Lee Town Center Fort Lee Historic Park The Modern

- Seal

- Location of Fort Lee in Bergen County highlighted in red (left). Inset map: Location of Bergen County in New Jersey highlighted in orange (right).

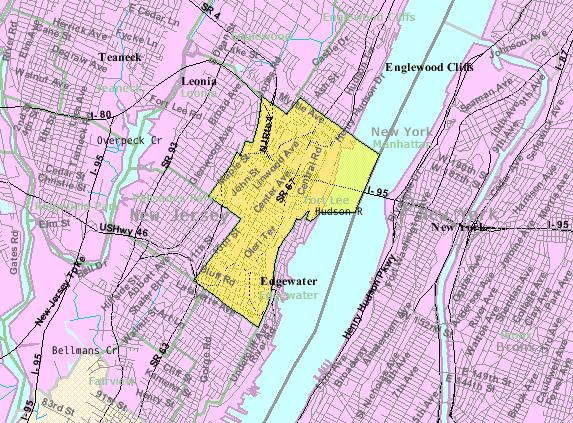
- Census Bureau map of Fort Lee, New Jersey
- Interactive map of Fort Lee, New Jersey
- Location in Bergen County Location in New Jersey Location in the United States
- Coordinates: 40.85064°N 73.971007°W
- Country: United States
- State: New Jersey
- County: Bergen
- Incorporated: March 29, 1904
- Named for: Fort Lee / General Charles Lee

Government
  - Type: Borough
  - Body: Borough Council
  - Mayor: Mark Sokolich (D, term ends December 31, 2027)
  - Administrator: Alfred R. Restaino
  - Municipal clerk: Evelyn Rosario

Area
  - Total: 2.86 sq mi (7.41 km^{2})
  - Land: 2.52 sq mi (6.52 km^{2})
  - Water: 0.34 sq mi (0.89 km^{2}) 12.33%
  - Rank: 344th of 565 in state 30th of 70 in county
- Elevation: 289 ft (88 m)

Population (2020)
  - Total: 40,191
  - Estimate (2023): 39,700
  - Rank: 59th of 565 in state 3rd of 70 in county
  - Density: 15,961.5/sq mi (6,162.8/km^{2})
  - Rank: 16th of 565 in state 4th of 70 in county
- Time zone: UTC−05:00 (Eastern (EST))
  - Summer (DST): UTC−04:00 (Eastern (EDT))
- ZIP Code: 07024
- Area code: 201
- FIPS code: 3400324420
- GNIS feature ID: 0885223
- Website: www.fortleenj.org

Fort Lee is a borough at the eastern border of Bergen County, in the U.S. state of New Jersey, situated along the Hudson River atop The Palisades.

As of the 2020 United States census, the borough's population was 40,191, an increase of 4,846 (+13.7%) from the 2010 census count of 35,345, which in turn reflected a decline of 116 (−0.3%) from the 35,461 counted in the 2000 census. Along with other communities in Bergen County, it is one of the largest and fastest-growing ethnic Korean enclaves outside of Korea.

Fort Lee is named for the site of an American Revolutionary War military encampment, named after controversial Continental Army general Charles Lee. At the turn of the 20th century, it became the birthplace of the American film industry. In 1931, the borough became the western terminus of the George Washington Bridge, which crosses the Hudson River and connects to the borough of Manhattan in New York City. Fort Lee's population and housing density has increased considerably since the 1960s and 1970s with the construction of highrise apartment buildings.

== Geography ==
According to the United States Census Bureau, Fort Lee borough had a total area of 2.87 square miles (7.44 km^{2}), including 2.52 square miles (6.52 km^{2}) of land and 0.35 square miles (0.92 km^{2}) of water (12.33%).

The borough is situated atop the escarpment of the Hudson Palisades on the peninsula between the Hackensack and Hudson rivers. The borough is bisected by the confluence of roads at the George Washington Bridge Plaza leading to the George Washington Bridge.

Unincorporated communities, localities and place names located partially or completely within the borough include Coytesville, Linwood, Palisade and Taylorville.

The borough borders Cliffside Park, Edgewater, Englewood, Englewood Cliffs, Leonia, Palisades Park, and Ridgefield in Bergen County, along with the Washington Heights neighborhood of Upper Manhattan in New York City. Given its evolving cosmopolitan ambiance and adjacency to Manhattan across the George Washington Bridge, Fort Lee, one of the Hudson Waterfront communities of northern New Jersey, has been called a sixth borough of New York City.

== History ==
=== Early settlement ===
The Lenape peoples were inhabiting the area when Captain Henry Hudson was the first European to record the area in 1609. In 1756 Stephen Bourdette acquired 400 acres of land which included modern-day Fort Lee.

=== Colonial era ===
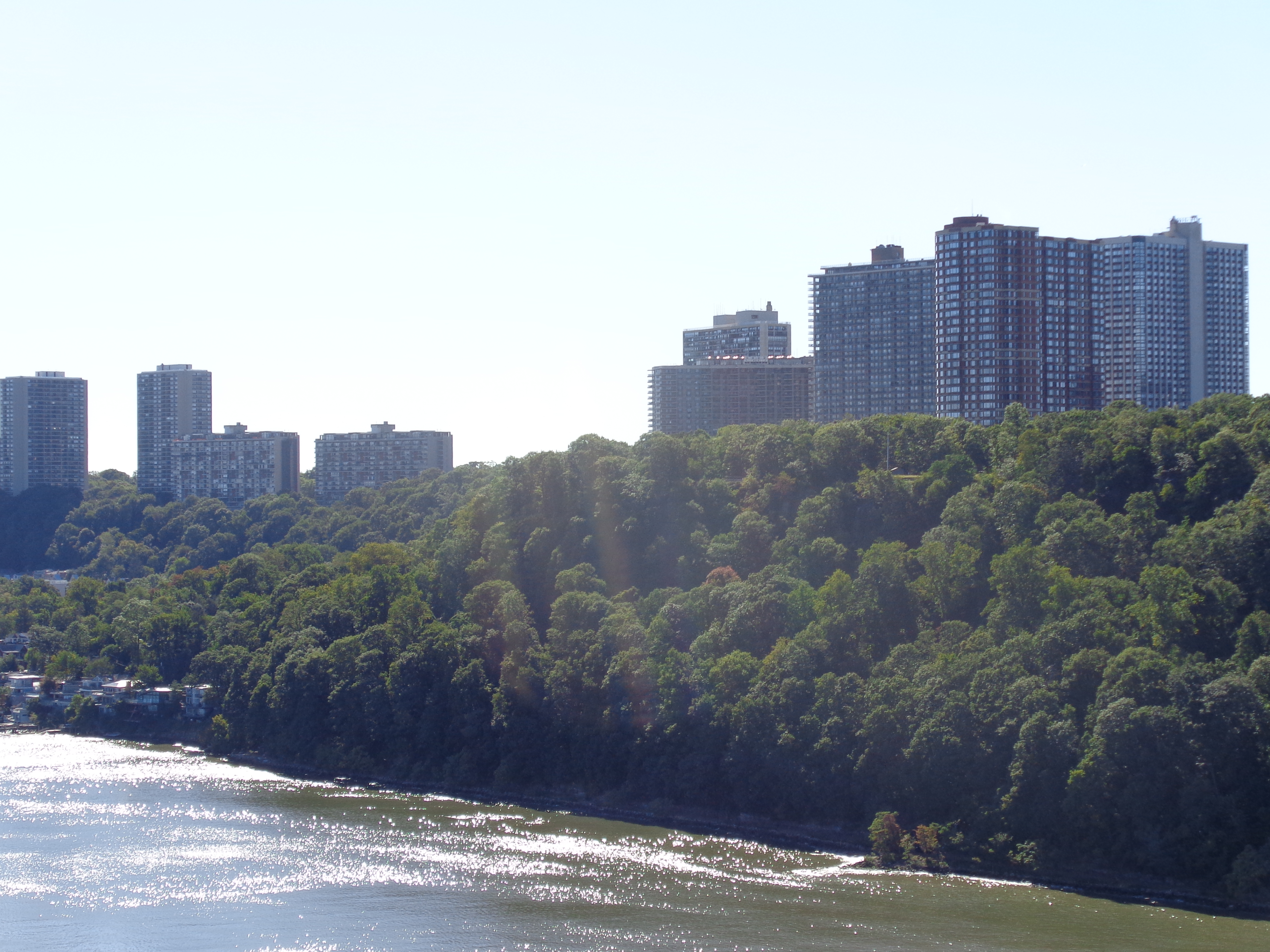
Established residential high-rises are a prominent feature of the borough of Fort Lee, with several over 300 feet tall.

Originally known as Fort Constitution, Fort Lee was named for General Charles Lee after George Washington and his troops had camped at Mount Constitution overlooking Burdett's Landing, in defense of New York City. It was during Washington's retreat in November 1776 (beginning along a road which is now Main Street) that Thomas Paine composed his pamphlet, The American Crisis, which began with the recognized phrase, "These are the times that try men's souls." These events are recalled at Monument Park and Fort Lee Historic Park.

=== Formation ===
Fort Lee was formed by an act of the New Jersey Legislature on March 29, 1904, from the remaining portions of Ridgefield Township. With the creation of Fort Lee, Ridgefield Township became defunct and was dissolved as of March 29, 1904. The Fort Lee Police Department was formed under borough ordinance on August 9, 1904, and originally consisted of six marshals.

=== America's first motion picture industry ===
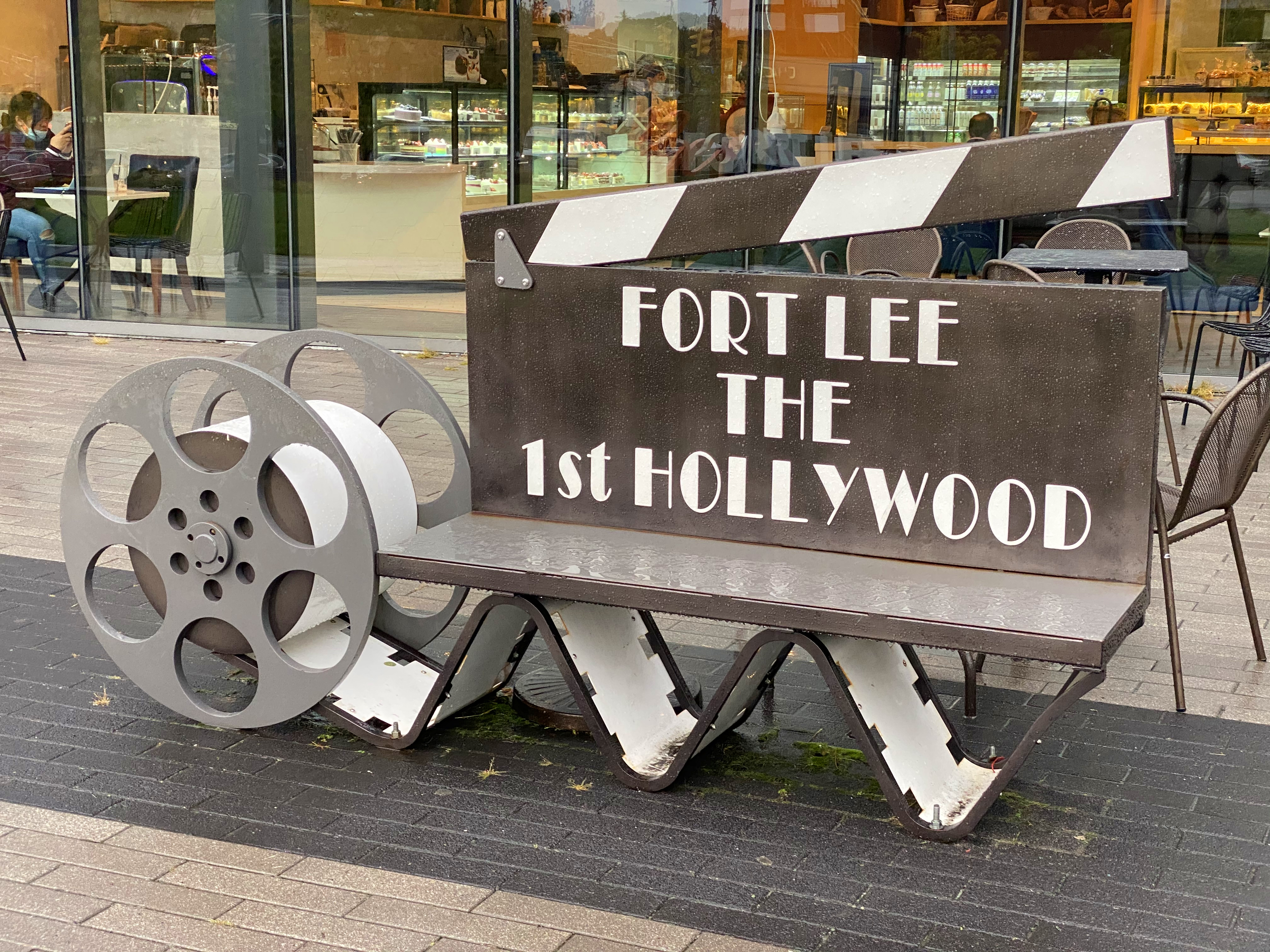
Sign reading "Fort Lee-The First Hollywood" outside the Barrymore Film Center

The history of cinema in the United States can trace its roots to the East Coast, where, at one time, Fort Lee was the motion picture capital of America. The industry got its start in the state at the end of the 19th century with the construction of Thomas Edison's "Black Maria", the first motion picture studio, in West Orange, New Jersey. New Jersey offered land at costs considerably less than New York City, and the cities and towns along the Hudson River and the Palisades benefited greatly as a result of the phenomenal growth of the film industry at the turn of the 20th century. A large number of early films were shot in Fort Lee.

Filmmaking began attracting both capital and an innovative workforce, and when the Kalem Company began using Fort Lee in 1907 as a location for filming in the area, other filmmakers quickly followed. In 1909, a forerunner of Universal Studios, the Champion Film Company, built the first studio. They were quickly followed by others who either built new studios or who leased facilities in Fort Lee. In the 1910s and 1920s, film companies such as the Independent Moving Pictures Company, Peerless Studios, The Solax Company, Éclair Studios, Goldwyn Picture Corporation, American Méliès (Star Films), World Film Company, Biograph Studios, Fox Film Corporation, Pathé Frères, Metro Pictures Corporation, Victor Film Company, and Selznick Pictures Corporation were all making pictures in Fort Lee. Such notables as Mary Pickford got their start at Biograph Studios.

With the offshoot businesses that sprang up to service the film studios, Fort Lee experienced unrivaled prosperity for nearly two decades. However, just as the development of Fort Lee production facilities was gaining strength, Nestor Studios of Bayonne, New Jersey, built the first studio in Hollywood in 1911. Nestor Studios, owned by David and William Horsley, later merged with Universal Studios; and William Horsley's other company, Hollywood Film Laboratory, is now the oldest existing company in Hollywood, now called the Hollywood Digital Laboratory. The Influenza pandemic and brutally cold weather led some film studios to start heading west by 1920; California's more temperate climate enabled year-round filming and led to the eventual shift of virtually all filmmaking to the West Coast by the 1930s.

At the time, Thomas Edison owned almost all the patents relevant to motion picture production. Movie producers on the East Coast acting independently of Edison's Motion Picture Patents Company were often sued or enjoined by Edison and his agents, while movie makers working on the West Coast could work independently of Edison's control, in part due to the Ninth Circuit Court of Appeals–which was headquartered in San Francisco and covered most of Southern California–being well known for not enforcing patents claims.

On July 9, 1937, a major fire broke out in a 20th Century-Fox storage facility in nearby Little Ferry containing hazardous extremely flammable nitrate film reels, destroying most of the silent films that had been produced in Fort Lee by Fox Film Corporation, one of the borough's first film studios.

Television and film in New Jersey remains an important industry. Since 2000, the Fort Lee Film Commission has been charged with celebrating the history of film in Fort Lee, as well as attracting film and television production companies to the borough. The Barrymore Film Center promotes films, filmmaking and its history in the borough.

=== Birthplace of subliminal messaging ===
In 1957, market researcher James Vicary claimed that quickly flashing messages on a movie screen, in Fort Lee, had influenced people to purchase more food and drinks. Vicary coined the term subliminal advertising and formed the Subliminal Projection Company based on a six-week test. Vicary claimed that during the presentation of the movie Picnic he used a tachistoscope to project the words "Drink Coca-Cola" and "Hungry? Eat popcorn" for 1/3000 of a second at five-second intervals. Vicary asserted that during the test, sales of popcorn and Coke in that New Jersey theater increased 57.8% and 18.1% respectively.

In 1962, Vicary admitted to lying about the experiment and falsifying the results, the story itself being a marketing ploy. An identical experiment conducted by Henry Link showed no increase in cola or popcorn sales. The additional claim that the small cinema handled 45,699 visitors in six weeks has led people to believe that Vicary actually did not conduct his experiment at all.

=== Korean community ===
H Mart, the largest Korean supermarket chain outside Korea, is headquartered in Fort Lee.

A small number of Korean immigrants have resided the area as early as the 1970s. In the 1990s, a continuous stream of Korean immigrants emerged into Fort Lee. A substantial number of affluent and educated Korean American professionals have settled in Bergen County since the early 2000s and have founded various academic and communally supportive organizations, including the Korean Parent Partnership Organization at the Bergen County Academies magnet high school and The Korean-American Association of New Jersey. Approximately 130 Korean stores were counted in downtown Fort Lee in 2000, a number which has risen significantly since then, featuring restaurants and karaoke (noraebang) bars, grocery markets, education centers and bookstores, banking institutions, offices, electronics vendors, apparel boutiques, and other commercial enterprises.

Various Korean American groups could not reach consensus on the design and wording for a monument in Fort Lee as of early April 2013 to the memory of comfort women, tens of thousands of women and girls, many Korean, who were forced into sexual slavery by Japanese soldiers during World War II. In May 2012, borough officials in neighboring Palisades Park rejected requests by two diplomatic delegations from Japan to remove such a monument from a public park, a brass plaque on a block of stone, dedicated in 2010; days later, a South Korean delegation had endorsed Palisades Park's decision. In October 2012, a similar memorial was announced in nearby Hackensack, to be raised behind the Bergen County Courthouse, alongside memorials to the Holocaust, the Great Famine of Ireland, and the Armenian genocide, and was unveiled in March 2013. On May 23, 2018, a comfort women memorial was installed in Constitution Park in Fort Lee. Youth Council of Fort Lee, a student organization led by Korean American high school students in Fort Lee designed the memorial.

=== George Washington Bridge lane closure scandal ===
The Fort Lee lane closure scandal, also known as Bridgegate, was a political scandal concerning the actions taken by the staff of New Jersey Governor Chris Christie and his Port Authority appointees to create a traffic jam in Fort Lee when dedicated toll lanes for one of the Fort Lee entrances to the upper level on the George Washington Bridge were reduced from three to one from September 9, 2013, to September 13, 2013. Three members of the Christie administration were convicted on federal conspiracy charges for their roles in the lane closures.

One of the reasons suggested for these actions was to punish Fort Lee Mayor Mark Sokolich, a Democrat, for not supporting the Republican Chris Christie during the lead-up to his reelection following the 2013 New Jersey gubernatorial election. Another theory was that Christie or his aides sought to punish New Jersey Senate majority leader, Loretta Weinberg, who represented the New Jersey district containing Fort Lee, as retribution for the Democrats' blocking of Christie's reappointment of a New Jersey Supreme Court justice. Christie withdrew his appointee consideration and delivered a speech referring to New Jersey Senate Democrats as "animals" just one day before emails were sent by Christie's aides to the Port Authority requesting the lane closures.

== Demographics ==
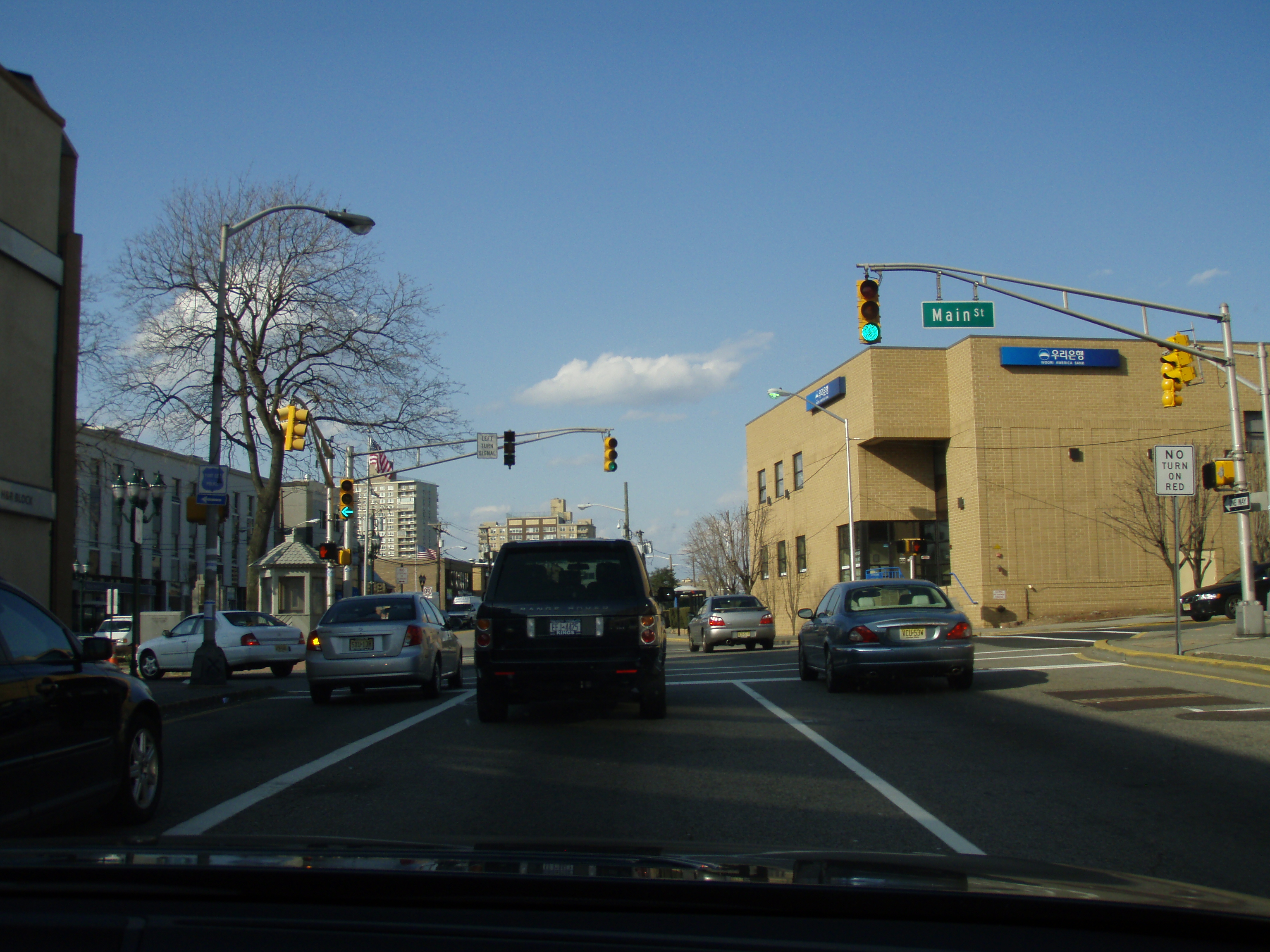
Fort Lee Koreatown is centered at the intersection of Main Street and Route 67 (Lemoine Avenue).

At the turn of the 21st century, Fort Lee saw a large Korean migration which has converted much of the town into a large Koreatown, in that many traditional Korean stores and restaurants may be seen in Fort Lee, and the hangul letters of the Korean alphabet are as common as signs in English in parts of the downtown area. This Koreatown is separate from the similar Korean enclave in the adjacent town of Palisades Park. The rapid increase of the Korean population has seen the decline of many other immigrant communities once centered in Fort Lee, notably the Greek and Italian communities, once quite large. A sizable Russian immigrant community has also sprung up in recent years.

The per capita Korean American population of Bergen County, 6.3% by the 2010 census, (increasing to 6.9% by the 2011 American Community Survey), is the highest of any county in the United States, with all of the nation's top ten municipalities by percentage of Korean population and an absolute total of 56,773 Korean Americans (increasing to 63,247 by the 2011 American Community Survey) living in the county. The concentration of Korean Americans in nearby Palisades Park in turn is the highest of any municipality in Bergen County, at 52% of the population, enumerating 10,115 residents of Korean ancestry; while Fort Lee has nearly as many Koreans by absolute numbers, at 8,318, representing 23.5% of its 2010 population. Along with Koreatowns in New York City and Long Island, the Bergen County Koreatowns serve as the nexus for an overall Korean American population of 218,764 individuals in the Greater New York Combined Statistical Area, the second-largest population of ethnic Koreans outside of Korea.

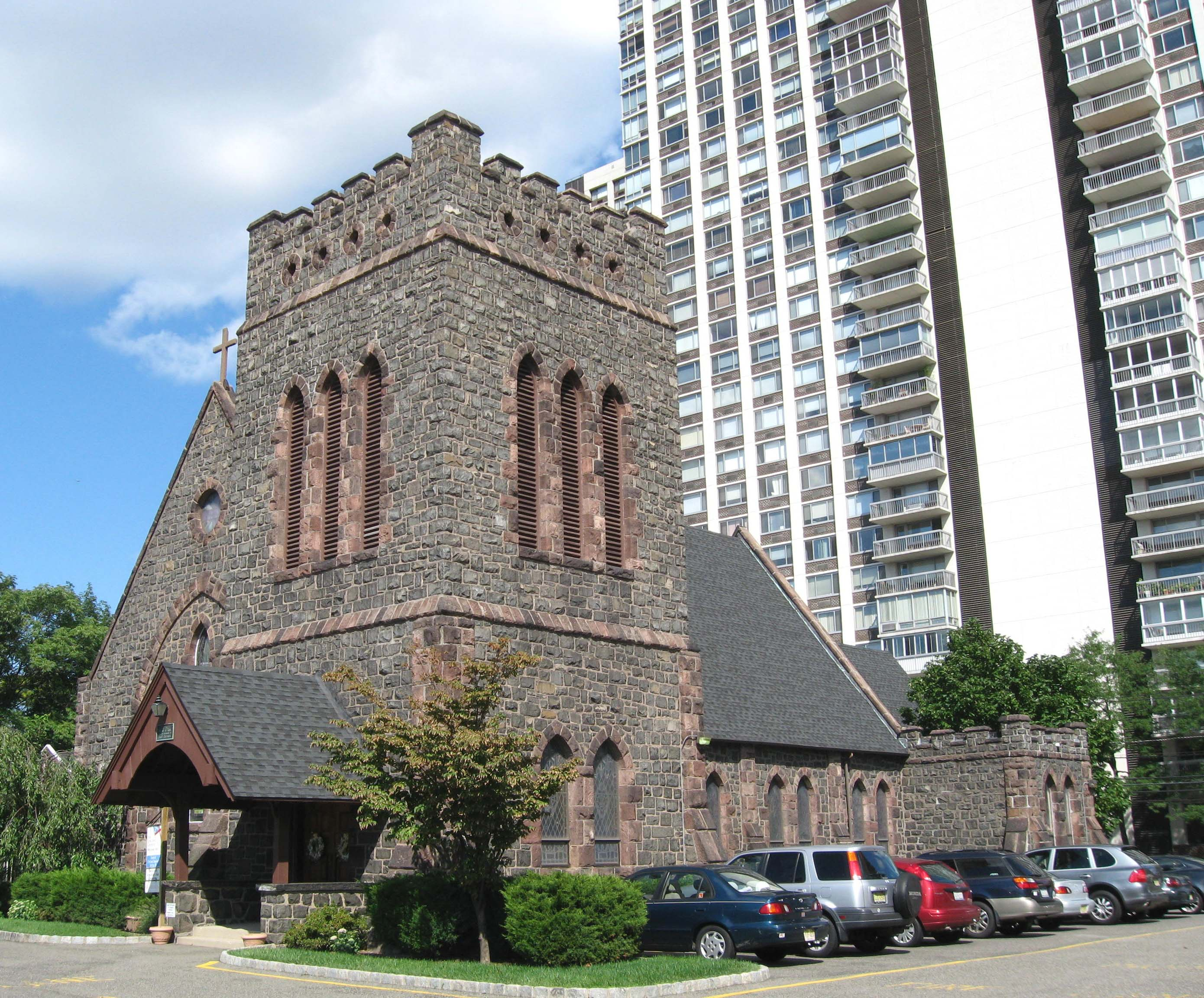
Episcopal Church

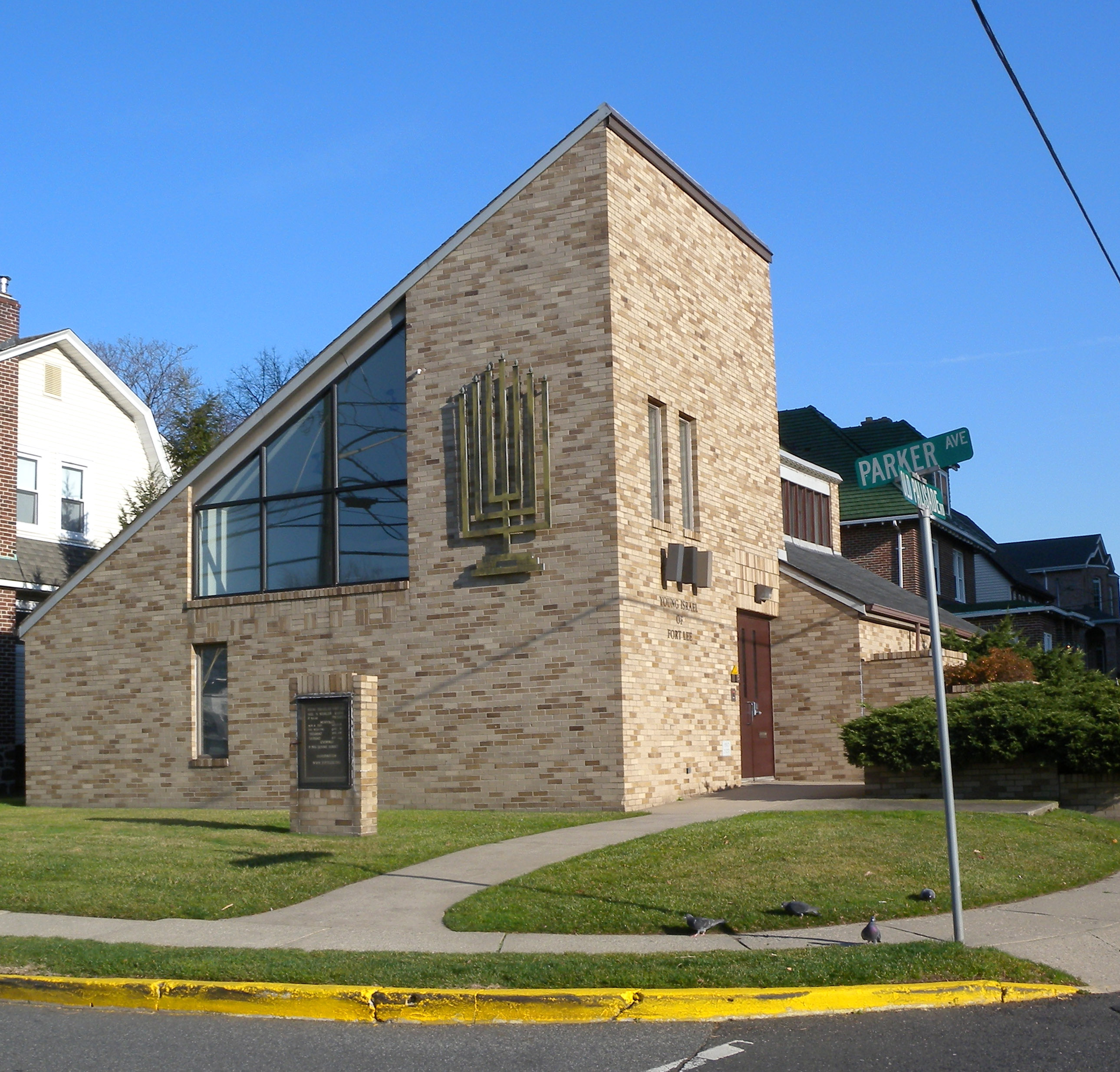
Young Israel Synagogue

Historical population
Census	Pop.	Note	%±
1880	1,424		—
1890	1,253		−12.0%
1900	2,612		108.5%
1910	4,472		71.2%
1920	5,761		28.8%
1930	8,759		52.0%
1940	9,468		8.1%
1950	11,648		23.0%
1960	21,815		87.3%
1970	30,631		40.4%
1980	32,449		5.9%
1990	31,997		−1.4%
2000	35,461		10.8%
2010	35,345		−0.3%
2020	40,191		13.7%
2023 (est.)	39,700	▼	−1.2%
Population sources: 1910–1920 1910; 1910–1930 1900–2020; 2000 2010 2020

In March 2011, about 2,500 Japanese-Americans were living in Edgewater and Fort Lee, the largest concentration of Japanese-Americans in New Jersey.

There were 1,119 Fort Lee residents who filed claims to recover lost money from the Madoff investment scandal, the most from any ZIP code.

=== Racial and ethnic composition ===
Fort Lee borough, Bergen County, New Jersey – Racial and ethnic composition Note: the US Census treats Hispanic/Latino as an ethnic category. This table excludes Latinos from the racial categories and assigns them to a separate category. Hispanics/Latinos may be of any race.
Race / Ethnicity (NH = Non-Hispanic)	Pop 2000	Pop 2010	Pop 2020	% 2000	% 2010	% 2020
White alone (NH)	20,350	16,514	15,488	57.39%	46.72%	38.54%
Black or African American alone (NH)	555	805	1,192	1.57%	2.28%	2.97%
Native American or Alaska Native alone (NH)	17	29	21	0.05%	0.08%	0.05%
Asian alone (NH)	11,121	13,552	16,949	31.36%	38.34%	42.17%
Native Hawaiian or Pacific Islander alone (NH)	11	7	9	0.03%	0.02%	0.02%
Other race alone (NH)	62	92	236	0.17%	0.26%	0.59%
Mixed race or Multiracial (NH)	554	469	920	1.56%	1.33%	2.29%
Hispanic or Latino (any race)	2,791	3,877	5,376	7.87%	10.97%	13.38%
Total	35,461	35,345	40,191	100.00%	100.00%	100.00%

=== 2020 census ===
As of the 2020 census, Fort Lee had a population of 40,191. The median age was 45.7 years. 17.1% of residents were under the age of 18 and 24.0% of residents were 65 years of age or older. For every 100 females there were 88.8 males, and for every 100 females age 18 and over there were 85.7 males age 18 and over.

100.0% of residents lived in urban areas, while 0.0% lived in rural areas.

There were 18,451 households in Fort Lee, of which 23.3% had children under the age of 18 living in them. Of all households, 44.8% were married-couple households, 19.0% were households with a male householder and no spouse or partner present, and 32.4% were households with a female householder and no spouse or partner present. About 36.5% of all households were made up of individuals and 17.2% had someone living alone who was 65 years of age or older.

There were 19,861 housing units, of which 7.1% were vacant. The homeowner vacancy rate was 2.2% and the rental vacancy rate was 7.0%.

=== 2010 census ===
The 2010 United States census counted 35,345 people, 16,371 households, and 9,364 families in the borough. The population density was 13,910.9 per square mile (5,371.0/km^{2}). There were 17,818 housing units at an average density of 7,012.7 per square mile (2,707.6/km^{2}). The racial makeup was 53.49% (18,905) White, 2.75% (973) Black or African American, 0.14% (50) Native American, 38.44% (13,587) Asian, 0.02% (7) Pacific Islander, 3.08% (1,090) from other races, and 2.07% (733) from two or more races. Hispanic or Latino of any race were 10.97% (3,877) of the population. Korean Americans accounted for 23.5% of the 2010 population, or 8,306 people.

Of the 16,371 households, 21.8% had children under the age of 18; 45.6% were married couples living together; 8.5% had a female householder with no husband present and 42.8% were non-families. Of all households, 38.4% were made up of individuals and 17.0% had someone living alone who was 65 years of age or older. The average household size was 2.16 and the average family size was 2.89. Same-sex couples headed 127 households in 2010, an increase from the 65 counted in 2000.

17.0% of the population were under the age of 18, 5.3% from 18 to 24, 28.1% from 25 to 44, 27.7% from 45 to 64, and 21.8% who were 65 years of age or older. The median age was 44.7 years. For every 100 females, the population had 86.9 males. For every 100 females ages 18 and older there were 83.8 males.

The Census Bureau's 2006–2010 American Community Survey showed that (in 2010 inflation-adjusted dollars) median household income was $72,341 (with a margin of error of +/− $4,502) and the median family income was $86,489 (+/− $11,977). Males had a median income of $66,015 (+/− $3,526) versus $55,511 (+/− $3,404) for females. The per capita income for the borough was $44,996 (+/− $2,903). About 5.5% of families and 7.7% of the population were below the poverty line, including 7.1% of those under age 18 and 9.0% of those age 65 or over.

=== 2000 census ===
As of the 2000 United States census there were 35,461 people, 16,544 households, and 9,396 families residing in the borough. The population density was 14,001.7 inhabitants per square mile (5,406.1/km^{2}). There were 17,446 housing units at an average density of 6,888.5 per square mile (2,659.7/km^{2}). The racial makeup of the borough was 62.75% White, 31.43% Asian, 1.73% African American, 0.07% Native American, 0.06% Pacific Islander, 1.69% from other races, and 2.26% from two or more races. Hispanic or Latino of any race were 7.87% of the population.

There were 16,544 households, out of which 22.6% had children under the age of 18 living with them, 46.7% were married couples living together, 7.4% had a female householder with no husband present, and 43.2% were non-families. 39.0% of all households were made up of individuals, and 15.2% had someone living alone who was 65 years of age or older. The average household size was 2.14 and the average family size was 2.88.

In the borough the age distribution of the population shows 17.5% under the age of 18, 5.1% from 18 to 24, 32.6% from 25 to 44, 24.7% from 45 to 64, and 20.2% who were 65 years of age or older. The median age was 42 years. For every 100 females, there were 87.7 males. For every 100 females age 18 and over, there were 85.1 males.

The median income for a household in the borough was $58,161, and the median income for a family was $72,140. Males had a median income of $54,730 versus $41,783 for females. The per capita income for the borough was $37,899. About 5.7% of families and 7.9% of the population were below the poverty line, including 10.9% of those under age 18 and 7.9% of those age 65 or over.

As of the 2000 Census, 17.18% of Fort Lee's residents identified themselves as being of Korean ancestry, which was the fifth highest in the United States and third highest of any municipality in New Jersey; behind neighboring Palisades Park (36.38%) and Leonia (17.24%) – for all places with 1,000 or more residents identifying their ancestry. In the same census, 5.56% of Fort Lee's residents identified themselves as being of Chinese ancestry, and 6.09% of Fort Lee's residents identified themselves as being of Japanese ancestry, the highest of any municipality in New Jersey for all places with 1,000 or more residents identifying their ancestry. In the 2010 Census, 23.5% of residents (8,318 individuals) identified themselves as being of Korean ancestry, 7.5% (2,653) as Chinese and 3.7% (1,302) as Japanese.

== Economy ==
Companies based in Fort Lee include WINIA Electronics America, the American Bank Note Company and Cross River Bank.

== Arts and culture ==
The 21,500-square-foot (2,000 m^{2}) Barrymore Film Center, a movie theater, performing arts center, and film museum, was constructed at a cost of $16 million and opened in October 2022.

Since 2007, the Hudson Shakespeare Company has brought their Shakespeare in the Park touring shows to Fort Lee in "Shakespeare Tuesdays". The group now performs regularly at Monument Park (1588 Palisade Avenue, next to the Fort Lee Museum) with two Tuesday shows per month during the summer. The festival also tours similar dates in Hackensack.

Since the mid-1980s, Fort Lee Koreatown has become a Korean dining destination. Fort Lee's Korean food has been described by local food writers as being better than in Koreatown, Manhattan. Korean Chinese cuisine is now also available in Koreatown, as is misugaru. Korean cafés have become a major cultural element within Fort Lee's Koreatown, not only for the coffee, bingsu (shaved ice), and pastries, but also as communal gathering places.

== Government ==
=== Local government ===
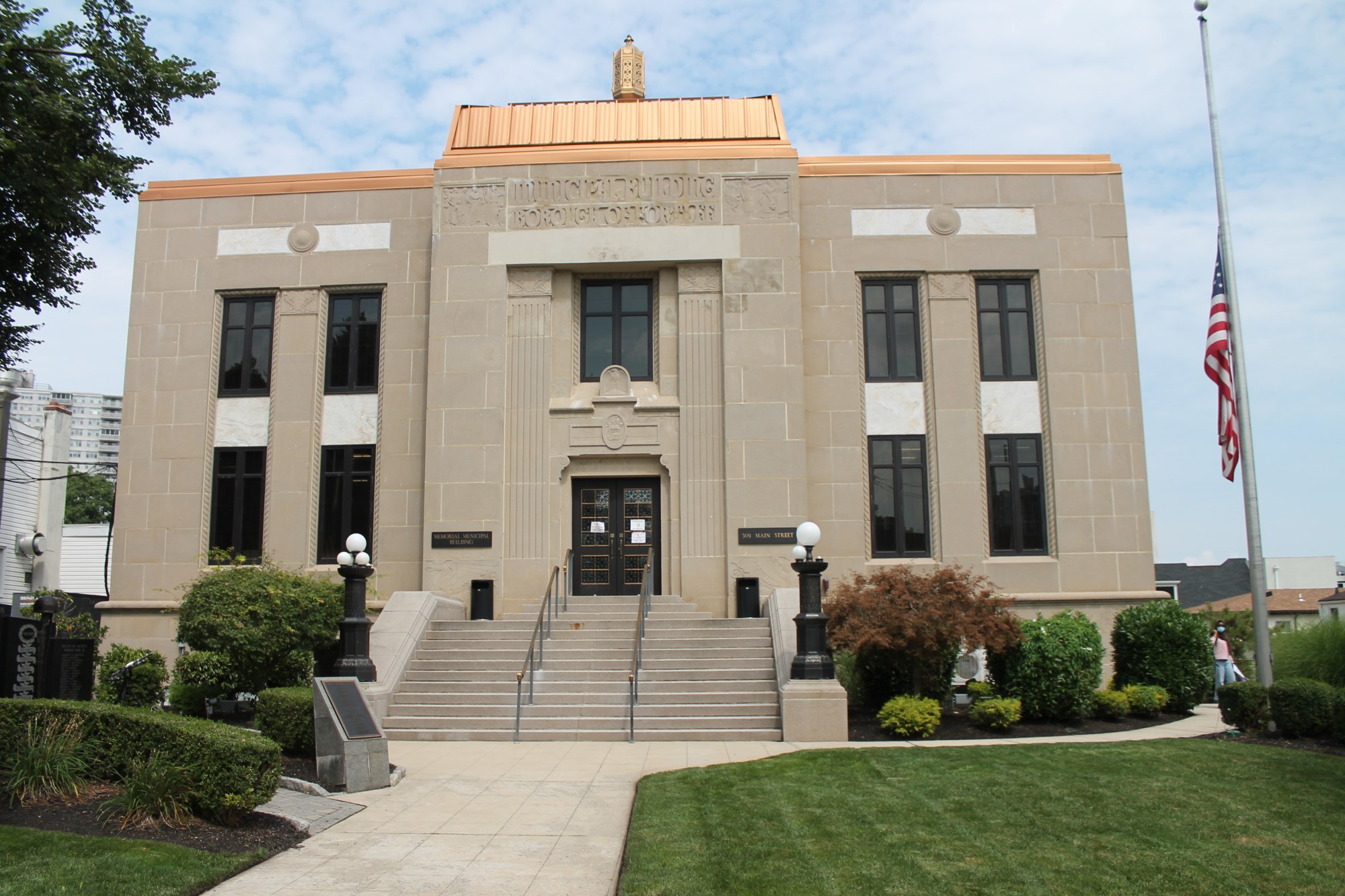
Fort Lee Borough Hall

Fort Lee is governed under the borough form of New Jersey municipal government. The borough is one of 218 municipalities (of the 564) statewide that use this form of government. The governing body is comprised of the mayor and the six-member borough council, with all positions elected at-large on a partisan basis as part of the November general election. A mayor is elected directly by the voters to a four-year term of office. The borough council is comprised of six members elected to serve three-year terms on a staggered basis, with two seats coming up for election each year in a three-year cycle. The borough form of government used by Fort Lee is a "weak mayor / strong council" government in which council members act as the legislative body with the mayor presiding at meetings and voting only in the event of a tie. The mayor can veto ordinances subject to an override by a two-thirds majority vote of the council. The mayor makes committee and liaison assignments for council members, and most appointments are made by the mayor with the advice and consent of the council.

As of 2026, the mayor of Fort Lee is Democrat Mark Sokolich, whose term of office ends December 31, 2027. Members of the Borough Council are Council President Harvey Sohmer (D, 2027), Joseph L. Cervieri Jr. (D, 2027), Bryan Drumgoole (D, 2026), Ila Kasofsky (D, 2028), Peter J. Suh (D, 2028) and Paul K. Yoon (D, 2026).

In November 2022, the borough council appointed Bryan Drumgoole to fill the seat expiring in December 2023 that had been held by Michael Sargenti until he resigned from office.

=== Federal, state and county representation ===
Fort Lee is located in the 5th Congressional District and is part of New Jersey's 37th state legislative district.

For the 119th United States Congress, New Jersey's 5th congressional district is represented by Josh Gottheimer (D, Wyckoff). New Jersey is represented in the United States Senate by Democrats Cory Booker (Newark, term ends 2027) and Andy Kim (Moorestown, term ends 2031).

For the 2026–2027 session, the 37th legislative district of the New Jersey Legislature is represented in the New Jersey Senate by Gordon M. Johnson (D, Englewood) and in the General Assembly by Shama Haider (D, Tenafly) and Ellen Park (D, Englewood Cliffs).

Bergen County is governed by a directly elected County Executive, with legislative functions performed by a Board of County Commissioners comprised of seven members who are elected at-large to three-year terms in partisan elections on a staggered basis, with either two or three seats coming up for election each November; a Chairman and Vice Chairman are selected from among its seven members at a reorganization meeting held every January. As of 2025, the county executive is James J. Tedesco III (D, Paramus), whose four-year term of office ends December 31, 2026.

Bergen County's Commissioners are Chair Mary J. Amoroso (D, Mahwah, 2025), Vice Chair Steven A. Tanelli (D, North Arlington, 2027), Chair Pro Tem Joan Voss (D, Fort Lee, 2026), Rafael Marte (D, Bergenfield, 2026), Germaine M. Ortiz (D, Emerson, 2025), Thomas J. Sullivan Jr. (D, Montvale, 2025) and Tracy Silna Zur (D, Franklin Lakes, 2027).

Bergen County's elected constitutional officials are Clerk John S. Hogan (D, Northvale, 2026), Sheriff Anthony Cureton (D, Englewood, 2027) and Surrogate Michael R. Dressler (D, Cresskill, 2026).

=== Politics ===
As of March 2011, there were a total of 18,382 registered voters in Fort Lee, of which 7,537 (41.0% vs. 31.7% countywide) were registered as Democrats, 2,487 (13.5% vs. 21.1%) were registered as Republicans and 8,350 (45.4% vs. 47.1%) were registered as Unaffiliated. There were 8 voters registered to other parties. Among the borough's 2010 Census population, 52.0% (vs. 57.1% in Bergen County) were registered to vote, including 62.6% of those ages 18 and over (vs. 73.7% countywide).

Gubernatorial election results for Fort Lee
Year	Republican		Democratic		Third party(ies)	
Year	No.	%	No.	%	No.	%
2025	4,194	37.81%	6,834	61.61%	65	0.59%
2021	3,194	37.57%	5,264	61.91%	44	0.52%
2017	2,044	31.57%	4,344	67.10%	86	1.33%
2013	3,735	55.30%	2,941	43.54%	78	1.15%
2009	3,191	36.67%	5,187	59.60%	325	3.73%
2005	2,482	29.59%	5,804	69.20%	101	1.20%

In the 2012 presidential election, Democrat Barack Obama received 7,891 votes (60.9% vs. 54.8% countywide), ahead of Republican Mitt Romney with 4,737 votes (36.6% vs. 43.5%) and other candidates with 104 votes (0.8% vs. 0.9%), among the 12,950 ballots cast by the borough's 19,738 registered voters, for a turnout of 65.6% (vs. 70.4% in Bergen County). In the 2008 presidential election, Democrat Barack Obama received 8,624 votes (61.0% vs. 53.9% countywide), ahead of Republican John McCain with 5,236 votes (37.0% vs. 44.5%) and other candidates with 114 votes (0.8% vs. 0.8%), among the 14,144 ballots cast by the borough's 19,352 registered voters, for a turnout of 73.1% (vs. 76.8% in Bergen County). In the 2004 presidential election, Democrat John Kerry received 8,367 votes (61.1% vs. 51.7% countywide), ahead of Republican George W. Bush with 5,161 votes (37.7% vs. 47.2%) and other candidates with 100 votes (0.7% vs. 0.7%), among the 13,692 ballots cast by the borough's 18,294 registered voters, for a turnout of 74.8% (vs. 76.9% in the whole county).

Presidential elections results
Year	Republican	Democratic
2024	41.1% 6,422	56.2% 8,780
2020	36.6% 6,433	62.3% 10,940
2016	35.5% 4,661	61.7% 8,097
2012	36.6% 4,737	60.9% 7,891
2008	37.0% 5,236	61.0% 8,624
2004	37.7% 5,161	61.1% 8,367

In the 2013 gubernatorial election, Republican Chris Christie received 55.3% of the vote (3,735 cast), ahead of Democrat Barbara Buono with 43.5% (2,941 votes), and other candidates with 1.2% (78 votes), among the 6,992 ballots cast by the borough's 18,356 registered voters (238 ballots were spoiled), for a turnout of 38.1%. In the 2009 gubernatorial election, Democrat Jon Corzine received 5,187 ballots cast (58.8% vs. 48.0% countywide), ahead of Republican Chris Christie with 3,191 votes (36.2% vs. 45.8%), Independent Chris Daggett with 287 votes (3.3% vs. 4.7%) and other candidates with 38 votes (0.4% vs. 0.5%), among the 8,817 ballots cast by the borough's 18,854 registered voters, yielding a 46.8% turnout (vs. 50.0% in the county).

United States Senate election results for Fort Lee1
Year	Republican		Democratic		Third party(ies)	
Year	No.	%	No.	%	No.	%
2024	5,317	35.89%	9,212	62.18%	287	1.94%
2018	3,669	36.17%	6,217	61.29%	258	2.54%
2012	3,924	33.80%	7,509	64.68%	176	1.52%
2006	2,863	32.93%	5,768	66.34%	64	0.74%

United States Senate election results for Fort Lee2
Year	Republican		Democratic		Third party(ies)	
Year	No.	%	No.	%	No.	%
2020	5,936	34.94%	10,780	63.45%	275	1.62%
2014	2,319	33.53%	4,506	65.15%	91	1.32%
2013	1,520	32.46%	3,129	66.83%	33	0.70%
2008	4,243	33.02%	8,481	65.99%	127	0.99%

== Emergency services and public safety ==
=== Police ===
The borough council created the Fort Lee Police Department in 1904, although it was not until 1927 that the council authorized the appointment of a full-time paid police chief. As of 2019, the police department had about 100 members.

=== Emergency medical services ===
The Fort Lee Volunteer Ambulance Corps, founded in 1971, provides emergency medical services to the Borough of Fort Lee, the George Washington Bridge, and the Palisades Interstate Parkway. One of the largest EMS agencies in the surrounding area, the Fort Lee Volunteer Ambulance Corps operates a fleet of four medium-duty ambulances, one first responder vehicle, and two command vehicles from its headquarters on the corner of Main Street and Anderson Avenue. With approximately 50 active members, the corps operates 24 hours a day on weekends and from 7 PM to 6 AM on weekdays, with paid borough employees staffing the ambulances during the day on weekdays. The Fort Lee Volunteer Ambulance Corps responds to approximately 3,400 emergency medical calls annually. The corps is a member agency of the East Bergen Ambulance Association (EBAA) with a standing mutual aid agreement with surrounding East Bergen boroughs.

=== Fire department ===
Fort Lee is protected around the clock by the volunteer firefighters of the Fort Lee Fire Department, which was founded in 1888 when the borough was still a part of Ridgefield Township and operates out of four fire stations. The Fort Lee Fire Department operates a fire apparatus fleet of six engines (including spares), two ladders, one heavy rescue, one squad (light rescue), two support services units, a mobile air cascade unit, four command vehicles(battalion and deputy chiefs), and six fire prevention units. The Fort Lee Fire Department's volunteer fire companies respond to, on average, approximately 1,800 emergency calls annually.

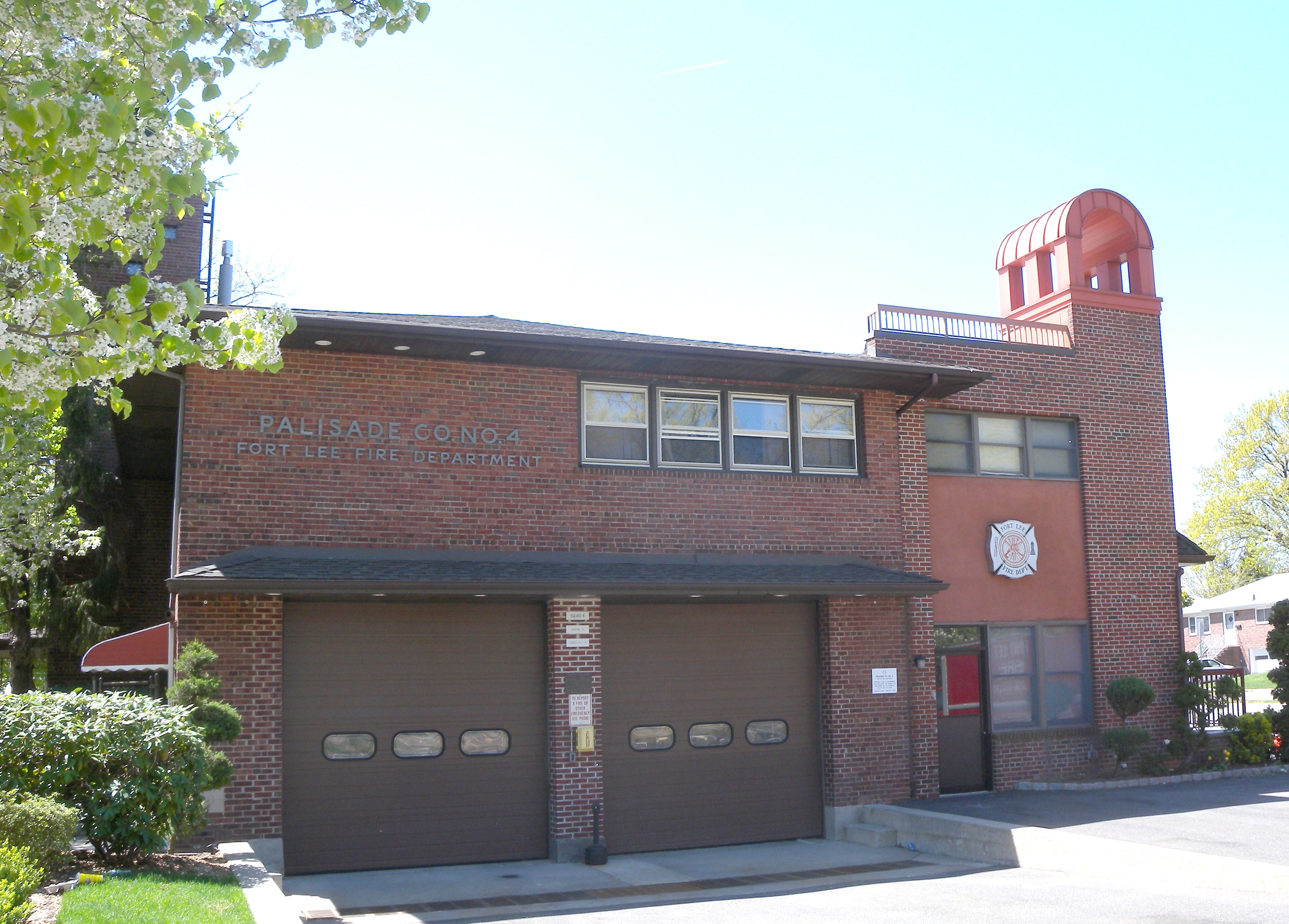
Fire Company #4

Engine company	Truck company	Special unit	Address
Engine 1, Engine 5			146 Main Street
Engine 2		Rescue 2 (heavy), Squad 2 (light rescue)	2481 Lemoine Ave
Engine 3	Ladder 1, Ladder 2		557 Main Street
Engine 4, Engine 6		S.S.U. 1, S.S.U. 2 (support service units)	4 Brinkerhoff Avenue

== Education ==
=== Public schools ===
The Fort Lee School District serves public school students in pre-kindergarten through twelfth grade. As of the 2021–22 school year, the district, comprised of six schools, had an enrollment of 4,074 students and 331.7 classroom teachers (on an FTE basis), for a student–teacher ratio of 12.3:1. Schools in the district (with 2021–22 enrollment data from the National Center for Education Statistics) are School 1 with 535 students in grades K–4, School 2 with 341 students in grades PreK–4, School 3 with 386 students in grades K–4, School 4 with 392 students in grades K–4, Lewis F. Cole Intermediate School / Lewis F. Cole Middle School with 1,153 students in grades 5–8 and Fort Lee High School with 1,223 students in grades 9–12.

During the 2010–11 school year, School #3 was awarded the National Blue Ribbon School Award of Excellence by the United States Department of Education, the highest award an American school can receive, one of only ten schools statewide to be honored. The school was one of three in Bergen County honored that year.

Public school students from the borough, and all of Bergen County, are eligible to attend the secondary education programs offered by the Bergen County Technical Schools, which include the Bergen County Academies in Hackensack, and the Bergen Tech campus in Teterboro or Paramus. The district offers programs on a shared-time or full-time basis, with admission based on a selective application process and tuition covered by the student's home school district.

=== Private schools ===
Private schools in the area include Christ the Teacher (Pre-K–8, 314 students), First Step Day Care Center (Pre-K, 101 students), Fort Lee Education Center (7–12, 78 students), Fort Lee Montessori Pre-School (Pre-K, 49 students), Fort Lee Youth Center Playgroup (Pre-K, 30 students), Futures Best Nursery Academy (Pre-K, 98 students), Green House Preschool and Kindergarten (Pre-K–K, 125 students), Happy Kids Pre-School (Pre-K, 75 students), Hooks Lane School (Pre-K, 54 students), Itsy Bitsy Early Learning Center (Pre-K, 60 students), Genesis Preschool & Academy (Pre-K, K–6, 83 students), Palisades Pre-School (Pre-K, 108 students), Rainbow School DC (Pre-K, 88 students), and Small World Montessori School (Pre-K, 51 students). Christ the Teacher Interparochial School operates under the supervision of the Roman Catholic Archdiocese of Newark.

=== Weekend supplementary education ===
The Japanese Weekend School of New Jersey (ニュージャージー補習授業校), a Japanese supplementary educational school, holds its classes at Paramus Catholic High School in Paramus while its offices are in Fort Lee. It is one of the two weekend Japanese school systems operated by the Japanese Educational Institute of New York (JEI; ニューヨーク日本人教育審議会 Nyūyōku Nihonjin Kyōiku Shingi Kai), a nonprofit organization which also operates two Japanese day schools in the New York City area.

In 1987 there were two juku (Japanese-style cram schools) in Fort Lee. One of the Fort Lee schools, Hinoki School, had 130 students. There were additionally two institutions trying to open juku in Fort Lee.

== Transportation ==
=== Roads and highways ===
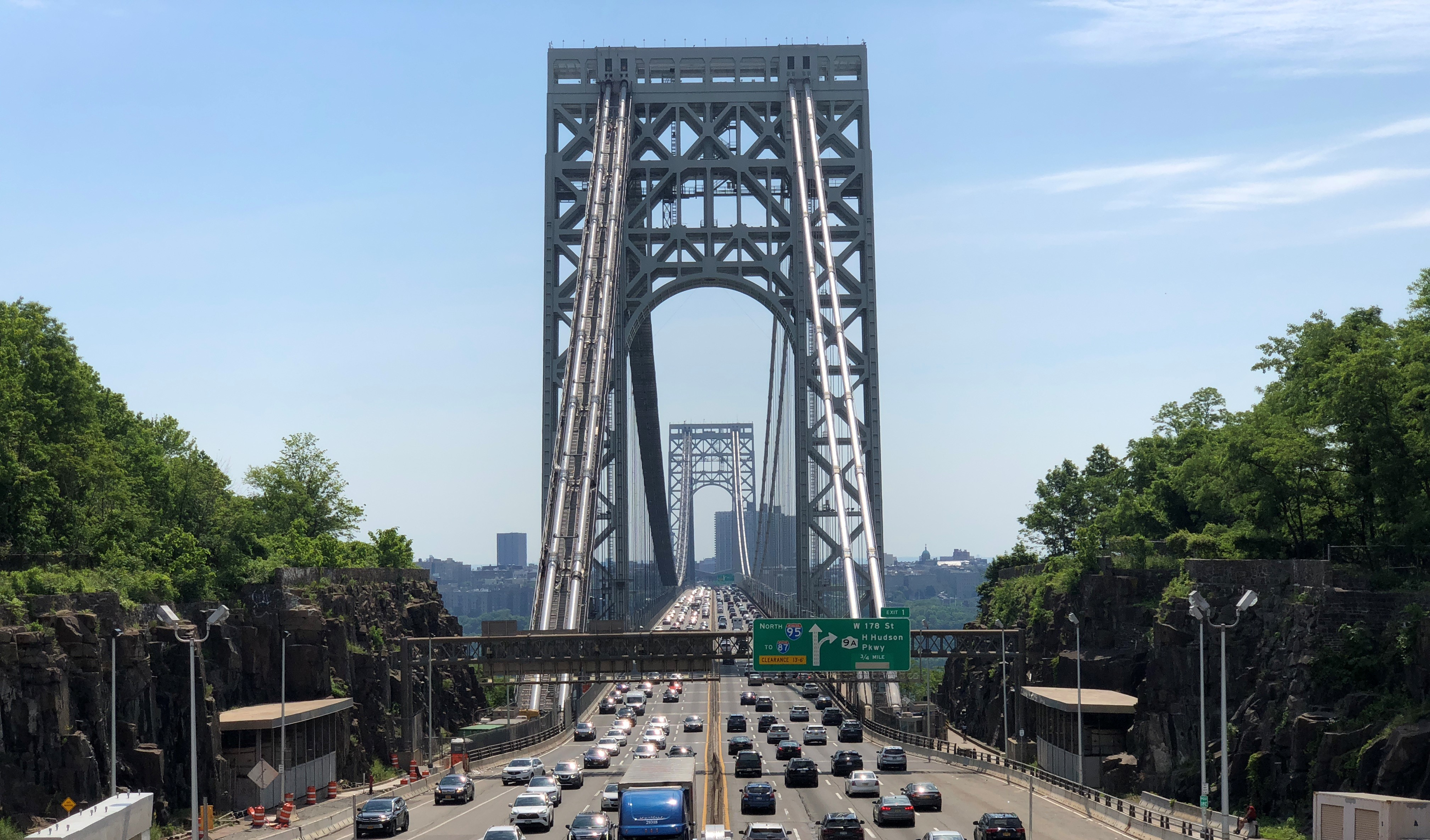
View northbound along Interstate 95, U.S. Route 1/9, and eastbound along U.S. Route 46, just before leaving Fort Lee for New York City via the George Washington Bridge

As of May 2010, the borough had a total of 51.12 miles (82.27 km) of roadways, of which 35.44 miles (57.04 km) were maintained by the municipality, 6.20 miles (9.98 km) by Bergen County and 6.22 miles (10.01 km) by the New Jersey Department of Transportation and 3.26 miles (5.25 km) by the Palisades Interstate Park Commission, the Port Authority of New York and New Jersey and the New Jersey Turnpike Authority.

Fort Lee is served by numerous roads including Route 4, Route 5, Route 67, U.S. Route 9W, U.S. Route 1/9, U.S. Route 46, and County Route 505. The two limited access roads that traverse through include the Palisades Interstate Parkway and Interstate 95 (which is the northern terminus of the New Jersey Turnpike). The George Washington Bridge (signed as I-95/US 1-9/US 46), the world's busiest motor vehicle bridge, crosses the Hudson River from Fort Lee to the Washington Heights neighborhood of Upper Manhattan in New York City. Many of these roads converge at GWB Plaza, a busy crossroads at the northern end of the borough.

=== Public transportation ===
Fort Lee is served by NJ Transit buses 154, 156, 158 and 159 to the Port Authority Bus Terminal in Midtown Manhattan; the 171, 175, 178, 181, 182, 186 and 188 lines to the George Washington Bridge Bus Terminal; and local service on the 751, 753, 755 and 756.

Rockland Coaches provides service along Route 9W on the 9T and 9AT bus lines and on the 14ET to the Port Authority Bus Terminal in Midtown Manhattan and on the 9 / 9A to the George Washington Bridge Bus Terminal.

The Fort Lee Parking Authority issues and controls parking passes, meter fees, and provides shuttles and non-emergency transportation.

As of 2016 two Taiwanese airlines, China Airlines and EVA Air, provide private bus services to and from John F. Kennedy International Airport in New York City for customers based in New Jersey. These bus services stop in Fort Lee.

As of 2021, OurBus offers intercity bus service from the George Washington Bridge bus stop to various locations such as Rochester and Buffalo, New York.

== Climate ==
The climate in this area is characterized by hot, humid summers and generally mild to cool winters. According to the Köppen Climate Classification system, Fort Lee has a humid subtropical climate, abbreviated "Cfa" on climate maps.

== Tallest buildings and structures ==
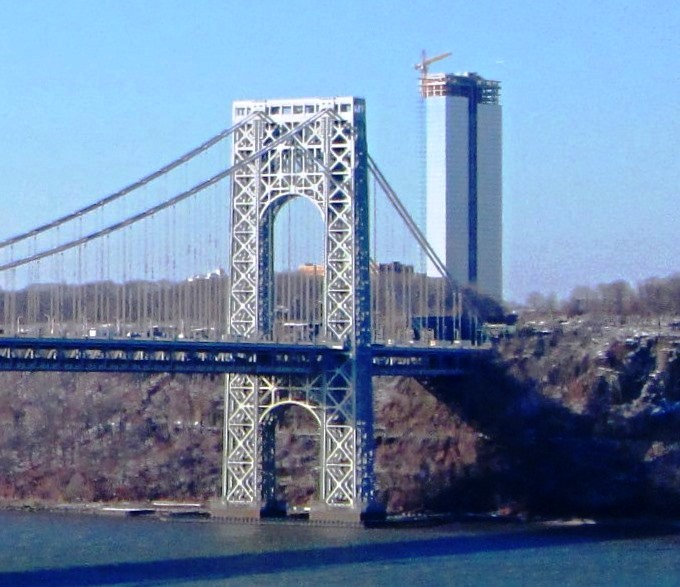
The George Washington Bridge, connecting Fort Lee (above) in Bergen County across the Hudson River to New York City, is the world's busiest motor vehicle bridge. Built in 1931, at 604 ft (184 m) meters, it is the tallest structure in Fort Lee. One of two 47-story residential The Modern, Bergen County's tallest buildings, is seen under construction near George Washington Bridge Plaza in December 2013.

The George Washington Bridge (GWB), at 604 ft (184 m) meters in height as measured from its base, is the tallest structure in Fort Lee. The cliffs of the Palisades rise to about 260 ft (79 m). Since the 1960s, numerous residential high-rise buildings have been built along the Palisade Avenue-Boulevard East corridor. Fort Lee's population and housing density increased considerably during the 1960s and 1970s with the construction of highrise apartments. As of 2019, there were 10 structures, including the bridge, over 300 ft (91 m) tall.

Rank	Name	Image	Height ft / m	Floors	Year	Notes
1=	The Modern 1		496 ft (151 m)	47	2014	
1=	The Modern 2		496 ft (151 m)	47	2018	
3	The Palisades		445 ft (136 m)	41	2001	
4=	The Plaza		347.2 ft (105.8 m)	32	1975	
4=	The Colony		347.2 ft (105.8 m)	32	1972	
6=	River Ridge		336.4 ft (102.5 m)	31	1985	
6=	Century Towers		336.4 ft (102.5 m)	31	1981	
8=	Horizon Towers North		280 ft (85.3 m)	28	1968	
8=	Horizon Towers South		280 ft (85.3 m)	28	1968	
10	Mediterranean Towers West		248 ft (75.6 m)	26	1982	

== In media ==
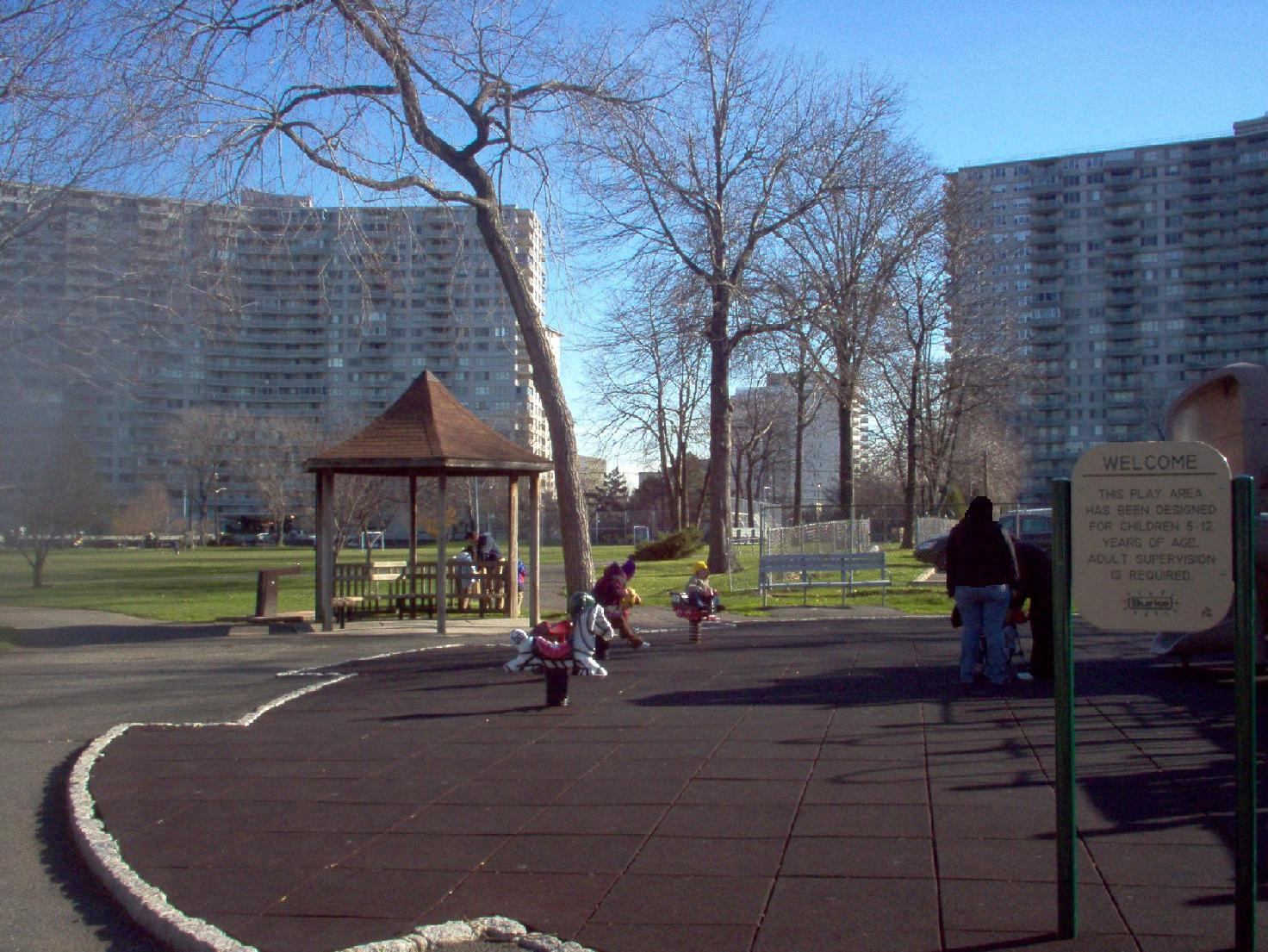
Constitution Park in Fort Lee. In the background are the Mediterranean Towers apartment complex.

- The borough was mentioned in "Weekend Update" segments involving fictional consumer affairs reporter Roseanne Roseannadanna, played by Gilda Radner, who almost always began reading letters by saying, "A Mr. Richard Feder from Fort Lee, New Jersey, writes in and says...." Feder was the brother-in-law of Saturday Night Live writer and segment co-creator Alan Zweibel and an actual Fort Lee resident until he moved to West Nyack, New York, in 1981.
- In the 1984 film, The Adventures of Buckaroo Banzai Across the 8th Dimension, the character played by Jeff Goldblum (Dr. Sidney Zwibel/New Jersey) introduces himself as being from Fort Lee, earning him the nickname "New Jersey".
- In Desperately Seeking Susan, the main character Roberta (played by Rosanna Arquette) is from Fort Lee. A key thematic element of the film is the contrast between Roberta's life in New Jersey and her desire to experience Susan's lifestyle in New York City.
- Martin Scorsese directed several scenes of Goodfellas in Fort Lee.
- Chabad of Fort Lee, a synagogue, was used as the filming location for the Queens, New York City, residence of Detective Elliot Stabler on Law & Order: Special Victims Unit.
- Hiram's Roadstand, a hot dog stand specializing in rippers based in Fort Lee since 1932, was featured in the "New Jersey" episodes of Anthony Bourdain's series No Reservations and Parts Unknown. The restaurant was a childhood favorite for Bourdain, as a resident of the neighboring town of Leonia.
- In late March 2011, a group of teenagers reported that they had been detained by the Fort Lee Police Department who left them in a police van parked for 14 hours overnight at headquarters. The detainees, who said that they had no food, water or access to bathrooms during that time, were released after passers-by heard their screams. In December 2013, $120,000 was awarded to each of three of the teens as settlement of a lawsuit that alleged that they had been unlawfully detained and that police officers had used racial epithets.
- On March 2, 2012, The show Morning Joe on MSNBC aired live from Fort Lee High School. Joe Scarborough and Mika Brzezinski joined Gov. Chris Christie, Rev. Al Sharpton, Michelle Rhee, Harold Ford Jr., Howard Dean, interim superintendent of Fort Lee Schools (Steven Engravalle) and other invited guests to discuss New Jersey's education reform.

== Notable people ==
People who were born in, residents of, or otherwise closely associated with Fort Lee include:

- Vito Albanese (1918–1998), politician who represented Bergen County in the New Jersey General Assembly from 1966 to 1968
- Albert Anastasia (1902–1957), Mafia boss
- Mickey Appleman (born 1946), professional poker player
- Allan Arkush (born 1948), film director and television producer known for Rock and Roll High School and the NBC series Heroes
- Miri Ben-Ari (born 1978), Israeli-American violinist
- Barbara Bennett (1906–1959), silent screen actress and literary representative
- Constance Bennett (1904–1965), stage and film actress
- Joan Bennett (1910–1990), stage and film actress
- Mike Berniker (1935–2008), record producer
- Alessandra Biaggi (born 1986), New York State Senator
- Balfour Brickner (1926–2005), rabbi emeritus of the Stephen Wise Free Synagogue in Manhattan
- Joyce Brothers (1927–2013), psychologist, television personality
- Brendan A. Burns (1895–1989), U.S. Army major general
- Charlie Callas (1924–2011), comedian and actor
- Cam'ron (born 1976), rapper
- Jonathan Cheban (born 1974), reality-television star and entrepreneur, noted for his recurring role on the show Keeping Up with the Kardashians and its spinoffs
- Nai-Ni Chen (1959–2021), Taiwanese-American dancer and choreographer
- Jay Chiat (1931–2002), advertising agency executive
- Liz Claman (born 1963), Fox Business Network anchor
- Haskell Cohen (1914–2000), public relations director of National Basketball Association from 1950 to 1969, known as creator of NBA All-Star Game
- Émile Cohl (1857–1938), French caricaturist, cartoonist, and animator
- Celia Cruz (1925–2003), Cuban-born salsa singer
- Irv Docktor (1918–2008), artist and educator best known for his work as a book and magazine illustrator
- Morton Downey Jr. (1932–2001), singer, songwriter, radio and TV personality; host
- Bill Evans (1929–1980), jazz pianist and composer
- Judith Exner (1934–1999), mistress of U.S. Senator, then U.S. president John F. Kennedy and Mafia leaders Sam Giancana and John Roselli
- Phil Foster (1913–1985), comedian and actor, played Frank De Fazio in Laverne & Shirley
- Buddy Hackett (1924–2003), comedian and actor
- Alan Hantman (born 1942), architect who served as the 10th Architect of the Capitol, from February 1997 until February 2007.
- Charles J. Hunt (1881–1976), film editor and director
- Jim Hunt, ice hockey former head coach and current president of the New Jersey Hitmen
- Arthur Imperatore Sr. (1925–2020), businessman best known as being the founder and president of the NY Waterway
- Jay-Z (born 1969), rapper
- Ron Johnson (1947–2018), former NFL running back for the Cleveland Browns and New York Giants
- Ali Khatami (born 1953), former Iranian Presidential Chief of Staff
- Randy Klein (born 1949), musician, composer, pianist, author and educator
- Jack Langer (born 1948/49), former basketball player and investment banker.
- Lee Jeonghee (born 1963) South Korean abacus master
- Samm Levine (born 1982), actor on Freaks and Geeks
- Nathaniel Lubell (1916–2006), Olympic fencer who competed for the United States in foil at the 1948 Summer Olympics in London, the 1952 Summer Olympics in Helsinki and the 1956 Summer Olympics in Melbourne
- Lynja (1956–2024), chef who was best known for her viral TikTok and YouTube Shorts videos
- Ted Manakas (born 1951), former professional basketball player who played briefly in the NBA for the Kansas City-Omaha Kings
- Michael Maggiano, personal injury attorney
- Eddie Mannix (1891–1963), film studio executive at Metro-Goldwyn-Mayer
- Willard Marshall (1921–2000), former MLB right fielder who played for the New York Giants, Boston Braves, Cincinnati Reds and Chicago White Sox
- D. Bennett Mazur (1924–1994), member of the New Jersey General Assembly
- Pierre McGuire (born 1961), ice hockey analyst and former NHL coach and scout
- Aline Brosh McKenna (born 1967), screenwriter who wrote the scripts for The Devil Wears Prada and 27 Dresses
- Bill O'Reilly (born 1949), television host, author, syndicated columnist and political commentator, host of The O'Reilly Factor on Fox News Channel
- John Orsino (1938–2016), Major League Baseball catcher who played for the San Francisco Giants (1961–1962), Baltimore Orioles (1963–1965) and Washington Senators (1966–1967)
- Johnny Pacheco (1935–2021), Dominican musician, arranger, bandleader and record producer, who was the founder and musical director of Fania Records
- Christopher Porrino (born 1967), lawyer who became served as New Jersey Attorney General from 2016 to 2018
- George Price (1901–1995), cartoonist best known for his work for The New Yorker
- Nia Reed (born 1996), professional volleyball player and member of United States women's national volleyball team
- Richard Reines, recording industry executive, co-owner of Drive-Thru Records
- Freddie Roman (1937–2022), comedian, New York Friars' Club notable
- Joe Rosario (born 1959), actor, writer, director
- Murray Sabrin (born 1946), college professor and Libertarian Party / Republican Party politician
- Amy Scheer, professional sports executive who is general manager of the Connecticut Whale of the Premier Hockey Federation
- August Semmendinger (1820–1885), photographic inventor
- Eva Shain (c. 1918–1999), boxing judge, one of the first female judges in New York, first woman to judge a heavyweight championship bout (1977 fight between Muhammad Ali and Earnie Shavers)
- Jenn Sherman (born 1969), fitness instructor who was the very first cycling instructor hired at Peloton Interactive
- Anton Sikharulidze (born 1976), Olympic gold medal-winning pairs figure skater
- Phoebe Snow (1950–2011), singer
- Alfonso Soriano (born 1976), outfielder who plays for the New York Yankees
- Darryl Strawberry (born 1962), Major League Baseball outfielder who played for New York Mets, New York Yankees and Los Angeles Dodgers
- Anthony Strollo (1899–1962), New York mobster who served as a high-ranking capo of the Genovese crime family until his disappearance after leaving his home in Fort Lee
- Lyle Stuart (1922–2006), independent publisher of controversial books
- Justin Tuck (born 1983), former NFL defensive end who played for the New York Giants and Oakland Raiders
- June Valli (1928–1993), singer and television personality.
- James Van Fleet (1892–1992), United States Army general
- Chien-Ming Wang (born 1980), pitcher for the Washington Nationals
- Theodore Dwight Weld (1803–1895), his wife Angelina Grimké (1805–1879), and his wife's sister Sarah Moore Grimké (1792–1873) lived in Fort Lee while working on American Slavery As It Is (1839)
- Jennifer Wu (born 1990), table tennis player originally from China who has been named to the U.S. team at the 2016 Summer Olympics
- Glen Zipper (born 1974), writer, film producer and former New Jersey assistant state prosecutor known for the Academy Award-winning film Undefeated

== See also ==
- Fort Lee lane closure scandal
- List of U.S. cities with significant Korean American populations
- Riviera (nightclub)
