= Ted Manakas =

American basketball player

Personal information
- Born: February 22, 1951 (age 75) Fort Lee, New Jersey, U.S.
- Listed height: 6 ft 2 in (1.88 m)
- Listed weight: 180 lb (82 kg)

Career information
- High school: Fort Lee (Fort Lee, New Jersey)
- College: Princeton (1970–1973)
- NBA draft: 1973: 3rd round, 36th overall pick
- Drafted by: Atlanta Hawks
- Position: Shooting guard
- Number: 23

Career history
- 1973–1974: Kansas City-Omaha Kings

Career highlights
- First-team All-Ivy League (1973)
- Stats at NBA.com
- Stats at Basketball Reference

Theodore Manakas (born February 22, 1951), is an American former professional basketball player for the Kansas City-Omaha Kings. He played in five National Basketball Association (NBA) games.

Raised in Fort Lee, New Jersey, Manakas played prep basketball at Fort Lee High School.

== Career statistics ==
Legend
GP	Games played	GS	Games started	MPG	Minutes per game
FG%	Field goal percentage	3P%	3-point field goal percentage	FT%	Free throw percentage
RPG	Rebounds per game	APG	Assists per game	SPG	Steals per game
BPG	Blocks per game	PPG	Points per game	**Bold**	Career high

=== NBA ===
==== Regular season ====
Year	Team	GP	MPG	FG%	FT%	RPG	APG	SPG	BPG	PPG
1973–74	Kansas City–Omaha	5	9.0	.400	1.000	.6	.4	.2	.0	2.4
