= Lee County School District =

Lee County School District, Lee County Schools, or Lee County Board of Education can refer to the following in the United States:

- Lee County Schools (Alabama)
- Lee County School District (Arkansas)
- Lee County School District (Florida)
- Lee County School District (Georgia)
- Lee County School District (Kentucky)
- Lee County School District (Mississippi)

== See also ==
- Lee County Public Schools (disambiguation)
- Lee School (disambiguation)
