= Jenn Sherman =

American fitness instructor and TV personality

- Born: December 1, 1969 (age 55); Fort Lee, New Jersey, U.S.
- Education: Syracuse University
- Occupation: Fitness instructor
- Employer: Peloton Interactive, Inc.

Jenn Sherman (born December 1, 1969) is an American fitness instructor who was the very first cycling instructor hired at Peloton Interactive.

== Early life ==
Sherman grew up in Fort Lee, New Jersey, graduating from Fort Lee High School, where she did not play sports. She attended Syracuse University, graduating with a Communications degree in 1990. Sherman worked out in college and valued fitness from an early age.

== Career ==
A resident of Demarest, New Jersey, Sherman took up indoor cycling in her 40s when she was a stay at home mom. She trained as a spinning instructor, teaching across multiple studios and gyms in Bergen County, New Jersey.

In 2013, Sherman sent Peloton an unprompted email to apply for a coaching job. She auditioned by teaching a spinning class in a makeshift studio before the company had products or in-person classes. Sherman was the very first cycling instructor hired by the company in May 2013, and has taught thousands of classes during her tenure with the firm.

Fans of Sherman's Peloton rides include Howard Stern and Rob Lowe.

== Personal life ==
Sherman has two children and has seen Bruce Springsteen in concert 75 times.
