= Lee School (Leesburg, Florida) =

- Formerly listed on the U.S. National Register of Historic Places
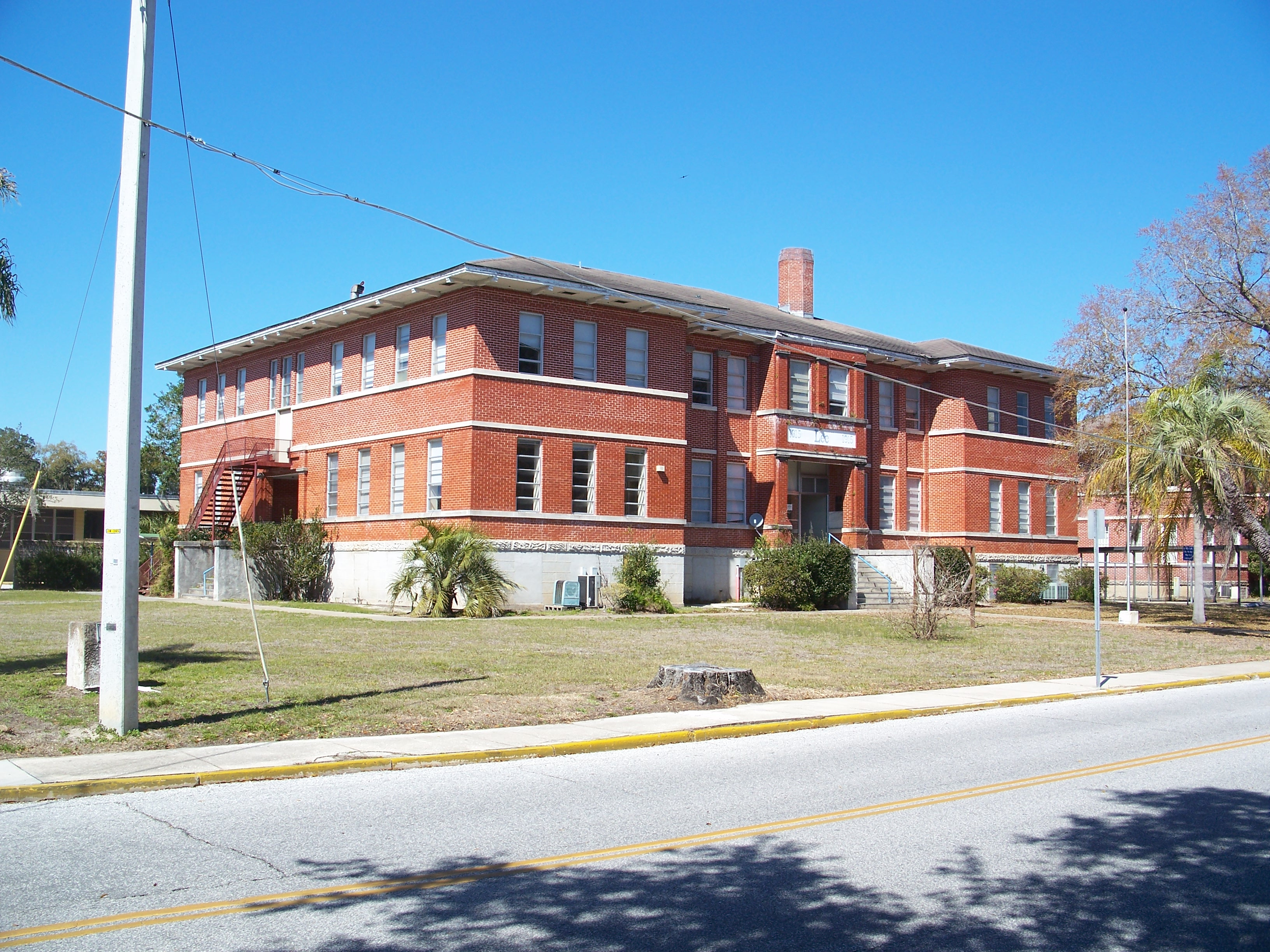

- Location within Florida Location within the United States
- Location: Leesburg, Florida
- Coordinates: 28°48′46″N 81°52′53″W
- Architectural style: Colonial Revival
- NRHP reference No.: 95000024

Significant dates
- Added to NRHP: February 17, 1995
- Removed from NRHP: April 4, 2025

The Lee School (also known as the Lee Adult Education Center) is an historic school in Leesburg, Florida, United States. It is located at 207 North Lee Street. It was added to the U.S. National Register of Historic Places in 1995, and delisted in 2025. As of 2008, the Lee School is up for sale, posted by the Lake County School District.
