= Lee County High School =

Lee County High School is the name of several high schools in the United States:

- Lee County High School (Leesburg, Georgia)
- Lee County High School (Kentucky) in Beattyville, Kentucky
- Lee County High School (Sanford, North Carolina)
- East Lee County High School (Lehigh Acres, Florida), a high school in the School District of Lee County (Florida)

== See also ==
- Lee High School (disambiguation)
- Auburn High School (Alabama), formerly named Lee County High School
