= Lee High School (Wyoming, Michigan) =

Location
- 1335 Lee Street, S.W. Wyoming, Michigan 49509; United States; 42°55′54″N 85°42′01″W

Information
- School district: Godfrey-Lee Public Schools
- Principal: Andy Steketee
- Teaching staff: 28.30 (FTE) (2024–2025)
- Grades: 9-12
- Enrollment: 537 (2024–2025)
- Student to teacher ratio: 18.98 (2024–2025)
- Campus: Small city
- Colors: Navy Blue and Vegas Gold
- Athletics conference: MHSAA; Alliance League
- Nickname: Legends
- Website: godfrey-lee.org/schools/lee-high-school/

Lee High School is a high school in Wyoming, Michigan (U.S.) that is part of the Godfrey-Lee Public Schools school district.

== Demographics ==
The demographic breakdown of the 524 students enrolled in 2021–22 was:

- Boys - 54.6%
- Girls - 45.4%
- Black - 7.8%
- Hispanic - 84.2%
- White - 5.7%
- Multiracial - 2.3%

91.4% of the students were eligible for free or reduced-cost lunch.

== Athletics ==
The Lee Legends compete in the Ottawa-Kent Conference Silver Division. The school colors are Navy Blue and Vegas Gold. The following Michigan High School Athletic Association (MHSAA) sanctioned sports are offered:

- Baseball (boys)
- Basketball (girls and boys)
- Bowling (girls and boys)
- Competitive Cheer (girls)
- Cross Country (girls and boys)
  - Boys State Champion - 1971, 1972, 1978
  - Girls State Champion - 1981
- Football (boys)
- Soccer (girls and boys)
- Softball (girls)
- Tennis (girls)
  - Boys State Champion - 1953, 1954 (3-way tie)
- Track and field (girls and boys)
- Volleyball (girls)
- Wrestling (boys)
