= Fort Lee School District =

School district in Bergen County, New Jersey, US

Fort Lee Public Schools

Address
- 231 Main Street Fort Lee, Bergen County, New Jersey, 07024; United States
- Coordinates: 40.851780°N 73.971760°W

District information
- Grades: Pre-K to 12
- Superintendent: Robert Kravitz
- Business administrator: Lindita Agastra (acting)
- Schools: 7

Students and staff
- Enrollment: 4,074 (as of 2021–22)
- Faculty: 331.7 FTEs
- Student–teacher ratio: 12.3:1

Other information
- District Factor Group: FG
- Website: flboe.com
Ind.	Per pupil	District spending	Rank (*)	K-12 average	%± vs. average
1A	Total Spending	$17,197	30	$18,891	−9.0%
1	Budgetary Cost	13,492	32	14,783	−8.7%
2	Classroom Instruction	8,137	27	8,763	−7.1%
6	Support Services	2,416	60	2,392	1.0%
8	Administrative Cost	1,343	31	1,485	−9.6%
10	Operations & Maintenance	1,248	13	1,783	−30.0%
13	Extracurricular Activities	322	80	268	20.1%
16	Median Teacher Salary	66,000	58	64,043
Data from NJDoE 2014 Taxpayers' Guide to Education Spending. *Of K-12 districts with more than 3,500 students. Lowest spending=1; Highest=103

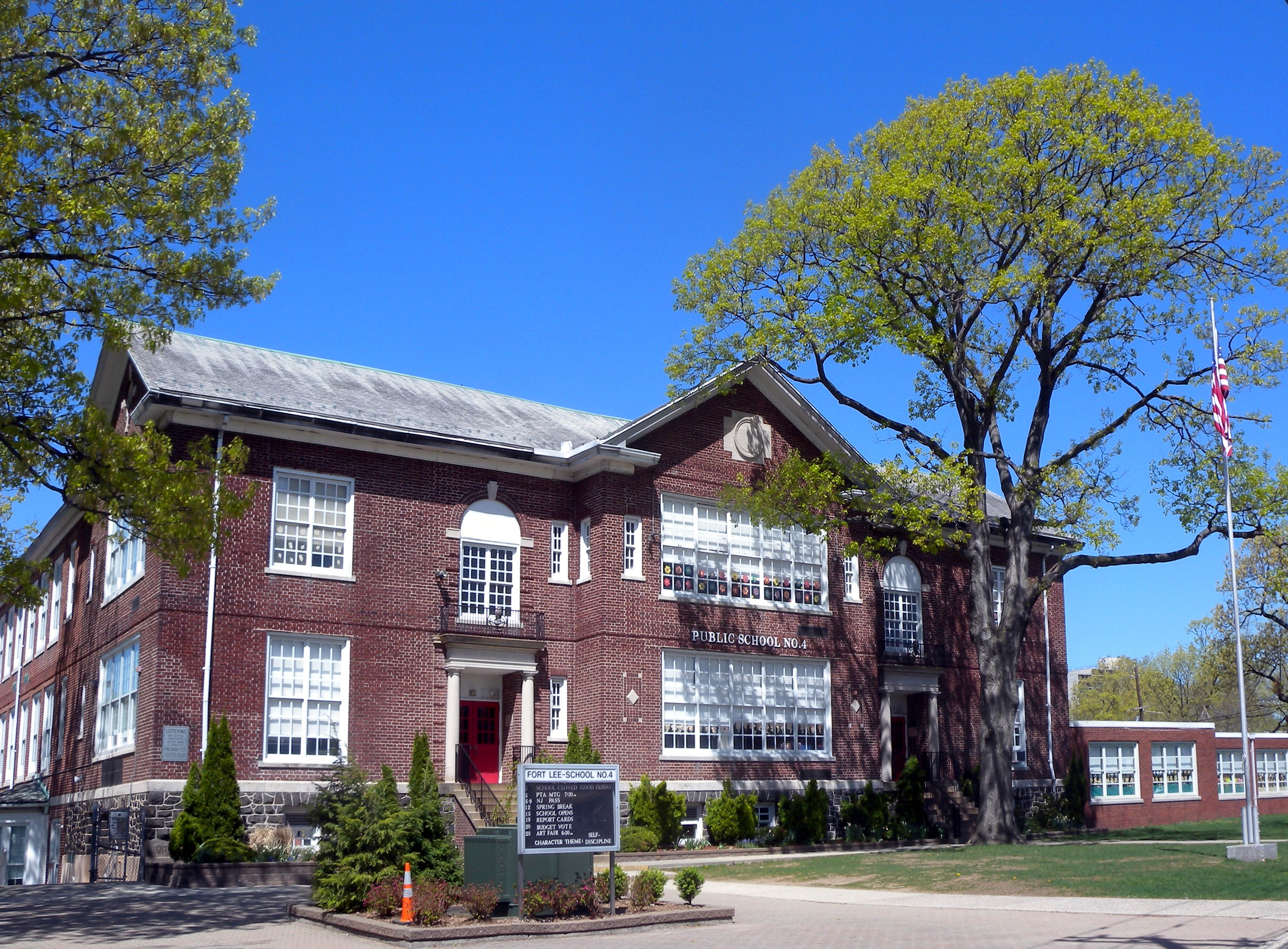
School No 4

The Fort Lee School District or Fort Lee Public Schools is a comprehensive community public school district that serves students in pre-Kindergarten through twelfth grade from Fort Lee, in Bergen County, in the U.S. state of New Jersey.

As of the 2021–22 school year, the district, then comprised of six schools, had an enrollment of 4,074 students and 331.7 classroom teachers (on an FTE basis), for a student–teacher ratio of 12.3:1.

The district had been classified by the New Jersey Department of Education as being in District Factor Group "FG", the fourth-highest of eight groupings. District Factor Groups organize districts statewide to allow comparison by common socioeconomic characteristics of the local districts. From lowest socioeconomic status to highest, the categories are A, B, CD, DE, FG, GH, I and J.

== Awards and recognition ==
During the 2010-11 school year, School #3 was awarded the Blue Ribbon School Award of Excellence by the United States Department of Education, the highest award an American school can receive, one of only 10 schools statewide to be honored. The school was one of three in Bergen County honored that year. In 2024, School 3 was one of 11 statewide that was recognized as a Blue Ribbon School.

Fort Lee High School has been ranked very highly both by U.S. News & World Report (92 of 451 in 2020) and the New Jersey Department of Education ranking (89% percentile in the state).

== Controversy ==
Fort Lee Elementary School 1 was in the news in 2018, receiving local and out-of-state media coverage after a teacher's assistant pleaded guilty to selling drugs on school grounds.

Two female former students filed a lawsuit against the school district for allegedly failing to protect them from a teacher who was inappropriate with two middle school students at Lewis F. Cole Middle School in 2012 and 2017. The teacher, Howard Sidorsky, has since been convicted of the crime.

== Schools ==
Schools in the district (with 2021–22 enrollment data from the National Center for Education Statistics) are:

Elementary schools

- School 1 with 535 students in grades K-4
  - Alberto Ruiz, principal
- School 2 with 341 students in grades PreK-4
  - John Brennan, principal
- School 3 with 386 students in grades K-4
  - Viveca Williams-Glover, principal
- School 4 with 392 students in grades K-4
  - Patrick Ambrosio, principal

Intermediate / middle school

Combined 1,153 students in grades 5-8

- Fort Lee Intermediate School
  - Thomas Kraljic, interim principal
- Lewis F. Cole Middle School
  - William Diaz II, principal

High school

- Fort Lee High School with 1,223 students in grades 9-12
  - Lauren Glynn, principal

== Administrators ==
Core members of the district's administration are:

- Robert Kravitz, superintendent of schools
- Lindita Agastra, acting business administrator and board secretary

Former District Superintendent Raymond Bandlow announced in August 2011 that although he had over two years left on his contract, he would be retiring in New Jersey effective October 31 to accept a position as superintendent of the Beacon City Schools in Beacon, New York. In addition to collecting a New Jersey pension, Bandlow will receive an annual salary below the $210,000 he had been receiving in Fort Lee, but more than the nearly $165,000 he would have received in a new contract in Fort Lee following restrictions on salaries imposed by former Governor of New Jersey Chris Christie.

== Board of education ==
The district's board of education, comprised of nine members, sets policy and oversees the fiscal and educational operation of the district through its administration. As a Type II school district, the board's trustees are elected directly by voters to serve three-year terms of office on a staggered basis, with three seats up for election each year held (since 2012) as part of the November general election. The board appoints a superintendent to oversee the district's day-to-day operations and a business administrator to supervise the business functions of the district.
