= Robert Lee =

Robert Lee may refer to:

== Politicians ==
- Robert atte Lee (1379–1386), MP for Reading, England
- Robert Lee, 4th Earl of Lichfield (1706–1776), British peer and politician
- Robert Lee (Canadian politician) (1862–1925), mayor of Edmonton, Alberta
- Robert Emmett Lee (1868–1916), Democratic member of the U.S. House of Representatives from Pennsylvania
- Robert Quincy Lee (1869–1930), U.S. representative from Texas
- Robert Lee (Lord Mayor) (died 1605), English merchant who was Lord Mayor of London in 1602
- Robert Lee Wai-wang, Hong Kong Legislative Council member

== Military ==
- Robert C. Lee (1888–1971), US Navy officer
- Robert E. Lee (1807–1870), American Civil War Confederate general
- Robert E. Lee Jr. (1843–1914), soldier during the American Civil War, later a planter, businessman, and author
- Robert Merrill Lee (1909–2003), United States Air Force general

== Writers and academics ==
- Robert N. Lee (1890–1964), American screenwriter
- Robert E. Lee (playwright) (1918–1994), playwright
- Robert Lee (obstetrician) (1793–1877), Regius Professor of Midwifery, University of Glasgow
- Robert G. Lee, professor of American studies at Brown University
- Robert Lee (historian) (1959–2010), English historian
- Robert Warden Lee (1868–1958), British professor of law

== Sportsmen ==
- Robert Lee (golfer) (born 1961), English golfer
- Robert Lee (canoeist) (born 1956), member of the Australian sprint canoe team at the 1980 Summer Olympics
- Rob Lee (born 1966), English footballer
- Robert Lee (basketball) (born 1968), head coach of the Louisiana-Lafayette Ragin' Cajuns men's basketball team
- Robert Lee (rowing) (1952–2018), British coxswain

== Actors ==
- Robert Lee (voice actor) (born 1957), narrator of MythBusters
- Robert Lee (British actor) (1913–1986), Chinese British film and television actor
- Robert Isaac Lee (1956–2004), Chinese American film and television actor
- Bobby Lee (born 1971, Robert Young Lee Jr.), American actor and comedian.

== Religion ==
- Robert Lee (minister) (1804–1868), Church of Scotland minister
- Robert G. Lee (minister), U.S. 20th-century Southern Baptist minister
- Robert W. Lee IV (born 1992), American minister and newspaper columnist

== Other people ==
- Robert Lee, Lord Lee (1830–1890) Scottish lawyer and Senator of the College of Justice
- Robert Lee (dentist) (1920–2010), American dentist who emigrated to Ghana
- Robert Lee Jun-fai (born 1948), Hong Kong musician and the brother of Bruce Lee
- Robert Lee (teacher) (1837–1922), New Zealand teacher, school inspector, and educationalist
- Robert C. T. Lee (1923–2016), Chinese-American veterinarian and educator
- Robert H. Lee (1933–2020), Canadian businessman and philanthropist
- Robert James Lee (1841–1924), British physician
- Robert Lee (sports announcer) (born 1976/1977), American sports announcer, currently works for ESPN
- Robert E. A. Lee (1921–2009), Lutheran film producer
- Robert E. Lee (FCC) (1912–1993), American government official
- Robert E. Lee (architect) (1870–1925), architect in Hattiesburg, Mississippi.
- "Robert Henry Lee", pseudonym used by John Jackson Cozad

== Other uses ==
- Robert Lee, Texas, a US city named after the general
- SS Robert E. Lee, a steam passenger ship

== See also ==
- Robbie Lee (disambiguation)
- Bob Lee (disambiguation)
- Bobby Lee (disambiguation)
- Robert E. Lee (disambiguation)
- Robert Leigh (disambiguation)
- Bert Lee (disambiguation)
