= Robert E. Lee (disambiguation) =

Robert E. Lee (1807–1870) was a Confederate general during the American Civil War.

Robert E. Lee may also refer to:

== People ==
- Robert E. Lee Jr. (1843–1914), youngest son of Robert E. Lee, soldier, planter, businessman, author, and a scholar
- Robert Emmett Lee (1868–1916), Democratic member of the U.S. House of Representatives from Pennsylvania
- Robert E. Lee (architect) (1870–1925), Mississippi architect
- Robert E. Lee (FCC) (1912–1993), Commissioner of the Federal Communications Commission
- Robert E. Lee (playwright) (1918–1994), Broadway playwright and lyricist
- Robert Lee (dentist) (1920–2010), American dentist who emigrated to Ghana
- Robert E. Lee, early 1970s WCFL disk jockey
- Robert E. Lee Van Winkle (1862-1928), Mayor of Oklahoma City

== Education ==
- Robert E. Lee Academy, Bishopville, South Carolina
- Robert E. Lee Elementary School (disambiguation)
- Robert E. Lee High School (disambiguation)

== Ships ==
- CSS Robert E. Lee, a Confederate States Navy blockade runner
- Robert E. Lee (steamboat), a Mississippi steamboat of 1866
- SS Robert E. Lee (1924), an Eastern Steamship Lines ship sunk by German submarine U-166 in 1942
- USS Robert E. Lee (SSBN-601), a United States Navy fleet ballistic missile submarine

== Sculptures ==
- Robert E. Lee Monument (Richmond, Virginia), by Antonin Mercié, first installed on Monument Avenue in 1890
- Robert E. Lee (Valentine), by Edward Virginius Valentine, in the crypt of the United States Capitol, Washington, D.C. since 1909
- Robert E. Lee Monument (Marianna, Arkansas), unveiled in 1910
- Robert E. Lee Monument (Charlottesville, Virginia), unveiled in 1924
- Statue of Robert E. Lee (Austin, Texas), by Pompeo Coppini, on the University of Texas campus from 1933 to 2017
- Robert E. Lee on Traveller, by Alexander Phimister Proctor, in Dallas, Texas, from 1936 to 2017

== Other uses ==
- Robert E. Lee (tree), a giant sequoia in Kings Canyon National Park, California, US
- General Lee (car), a 1969 Dodge Charger in the television series The Dukes of Hazzard

== See also ==
- Robert Lee (disambiguation)
