= Albert Lee (disambiguation) =

Albert Lee (born 1943) is an English guitarist.

Albert Lee may also refer to:

- Albert G. Lee (1879–1967), British radio pioneer
- Albert Lee (bishop), Anglican bishop
- Albert Lindley Lee (1834–1907), American military officer
- Albert Lee (accountant) (1910–1982), Michigan Auditor General
- Albert Lee (Paralympian) (born 1962), Paralympic sitting volleyball player

== See also ==
- Albert Lea (disambiguation)
- Bert Lee (disambiguation)
- Al Lee, American actor, producer and manager in vaudeville and silent films
