= Bobby Lee (disambiguation) =

Bobby Lee (born 1971) is an American actor and comedian.

Bobby Lee may also refer to:

- Bobby C. Lee (born 1975), American entrepreneur
- Bobby Lee (musician), American pedal steel guitar player since 1975
- Bobby Lee (ice hockey) (1911–1974), Canadian ice hockey player
- Bobby Lee (American football) (1945–2009), American football wide receiver

== See also ==
- Bobby Lee Hurt (born 1961), American basketball player
- Robert E. Lee, Confederate general
- Bob Lee (disambiguation)
- Robert Lee (disambiguation)
- Robbie Lee (disambiguation)
