= Robert Lee (dentist) =

Ghanaian dentist from South Carolina (1920–2010)

Personal details
- Born: Robert Edward Lee; 13 May 1920 Summerville, South Carolina, US
- Died: 5 July 2010 (aged 90) Labone, Accra, Ghana
- Spouse: Sara Archie (m. 1945, died)
- Children: 2
- Education: Lincoln University; Meharry Medical College
- Occupation: Dentist

Robert Edward Lee (13 May 1920 – 5 July 2010) was a Ghanaian dentist. Born in South Carolina to an African-American family, he studied dentistry in Tennessee and then in 1956 emigrated to Ghana with his wife Sara, also a dentist. They were classmates at Meharry Medical College. They were the first black dentists in the country. In the 1970s, Lee became involved with a campaign to refurbish forts on the coast of Ghana as monuments to the Atlantic slave trade. He lived in Ghana until his death.

== Early life ==
Lee was born in Summerville, South Carolina, to parents Samuel Eugene and Emily Holmes Lee. He had seven elder siblings and four younger ones. His father was a barber, but from that humble start Lee's siblings all went on to a variety of successes in business, engineering, medicine, and other careers. Lee did his undergraduate degree at Lincoln University in Pennsylvania, where he became acquainted with both future Ghanaian leader Kwame Nkrumah and future fellow American emigrant to Ghana W. E. B. Du Bois. Lee went on to Meharry Medical College in Nashville, Tennessee, where in 1945 he received his degree of Doctor of Dental Surgery. He married classmate Sara Archie that same year. The couple moved to New York City together for their residencies in dentistry, where they had two children: Robert Lowry Lee and Jeffrey Randall Lee.

Lee also served in the United States Army Medical Corps beginning in 1950 during the Korean War, in which capacity he was assigned to Camp Stewart in Georgia, near Savannah. Lee recounted that, as an officer, he was better treated than black civilians in Georgia, and for example was never the target of racial violence from police. However, he avoided stopping at restaurants or gas stations on highways, and left the base only with a specific destination in mind where he knew people, or to visit his mother who by then was living in Charleston, South Carolina, rather than going out "on the town".

== Emigration to Ghana ==
Lee first visited Ghana in 1953, hoping to learn more about his classmate Nkrumah's homeland and see if he could make a contribution to its development. He moved to Accra with his family in 1956. Other Lincoln University classmates and many other African Americans followed him in the years thereafter as well, bringing their skills and educations and hoping they could be of use to the newly independent country. During Martin Luther King Jr.'s visit to Ghana to attend the independence ceremonies in 1957, Lee and fellow African-American émigré Bill Sutherland organised a dinner for him, at which Julius Nyerere was a guest. He became known as the "elder statesman" of the African-American community of Ghana, as well as the country's "unofficial ambassador" to new African-American arrivals who had come in search of their roots.

As Lee later recounted to an American National Public Radio interviewer, his emigration from the United States was not driven by despair or abandonment of the Civil Rights Movement, but rather attraction to the enthusiasm shown by Ghanaians and their confidence "that they were going to be able to jettison colonial rule" and build up their country. Another major impetus was his desire to raise his children in, as he put it, "an environment that is not set up to make him hate himself", where "there isn't even any antiwhite feeling" and they "could grow up freer in their outlook on the world".

== Integration into local society ==
Despite Nkrumah's enthusiasm for the African diaspora's involvement in Ghana, African Americans who moved to the country faced various challenges, with some accused of being the "fifth column" of American imperialism, and others finding it difficult to bridge the gap between their own identities and their new experience of living in Ghana. However, Lee maintained his enthusiasm for the country; he stated that learning the languages of Ghana was one of the means he used to reduce the distance between himself and his Ghanaian hosts. He was naturalised as a Ghanaian citizen in 1963, renouncing his United States citizenship in the process.

After the National Liberation Council's overthrow of Nkrumah in 1966, many African Americans left the country entirely, but Lee remained, refusing to let himself become cynical about the country's future. With regards to those who chose to go home after just a short stint in the country, Lee stated to novelist Caryl Phillips: "The States has let them down in some way and they expect Africa to solve their problems for them. Africa isn't ready to do that. And maybe they're not ready for Africa. The States has got problems but it's their home. Hell, they're Americans."

There was a Ghanaian dentist by the name Dr. Tosu who was residing in Christiansborg but had a practice in Accra before Dr. Lee came to town(Christiansborg). When Lee moved to Accra, there was only one other dentist in the city, a Lebanese expatriate; Lee quickly put his skills to work by opening up his own dental clinic, using equipment he had brought with him from the U.S. and hanging his New York State dental licence on the wall. His wife, also a dentist, started the country's first dental teaching clinic. Lee credited some of the progress made by Ghanaian women in dentistry to his wife, stating that of the 50-odd Africans who had opened dental practices in Accra four decades later, half were women.

== Fort Amsterdam restoration ==
In the 1970s, Lee was active in the African Descendants Association Foundation (ADAF), which among other activities began efforts in 1971 to lease Fort Amsterdam at Abandze to preserve as a historical monument. Lee saw Ghana's slave forts as a symbol and a reminder of his own personal connection to the African continent, as well as that of all other African Americans. As the descendant of a former slave who had come back to Africa, he felt he had a historical duty to work towards the rebuilding of the fortress. ADAF raised funds for the restoration through a variety of activities, including a memorial service for Louis Armstrong, whose ancestors might have come from the fort's vicinity. Out of the total of US$50,000 sought for the project, by early 1972 Lee and his colleagues had raised about one-fifth of the amount. He stated that he wanted the fort to become "the focal point of the unity of Africans and Western black men. This fort and dungeons will symbolize our long struggle for real freedom, justice, and progress." However, as time went on Lee's attempts to raise funds from the United States proved to be less successful than hoped; despite promises by celebrities such as Isaac Hayes and Dionne Warwick, in the end there was little further enthusiasm among African Americans for his efforts.

ADAF's work surrounding the fortress brought them in conflict with the Ghanaian government, which was trying to raise funds from UNESCO to restore a variety of historical monuments in the country, and worried that ADAF's emphasis on European involvement in the Atlantic slave trade would be off-putting to potential foreign donors. Indeed, the Dutch embassy remonstrated against ADAF's involvement and complained that the focus on slavery excluded other aspects of the Dutch–Ghanaian trading relationship; the plaque presented by the city of Amsterdam refers only to "the memory of historic ties between Ghana and the Netherlands". As a result, on 5 February 1973 the Ghanaian government broke ADAF's lease on Fort Amsterdam and ordered Lee that "any activities should cease forthwith". Further negotiations failed to produce results acceptable to either side, and in the end the remainder of the funds that Lee had raised were donated to the Du Bois Centre.

However, despite this setback, Lee remained attached to the forts and to speak out against what he saw as their misuse. In a 1994 lecture entitled "On the Meaning of Slave Forts and Castles of Ghana" at a conference on the restoration of forts in Elmina and other areas, he described the forts as "sacred spaces" and condemned tourism officials who would see them converted into discothèques or hotels.

== Execution of son ==
Lee's son Robert, more commonly known by his day name Kojo, attended the Achimota School, where he befriended the young Jerry Rawlings. The two would later join the Ghana Air Force, where Kojo attained the rank of flight lieutenant. After his discharge, Kojo opened a golf course, restaurant, and bar in Accra. After Rawlings' second coup in 1981, which established the Provisional National Defence Council (PNDC), Kojo was at first suspicious of his old friend, and did not speak to him for three months, but eventually accepted the call back to service that the government extended to all discharged soldiers. On the evening of 28 October 1983, Kojo went out on patrol with two comrades in the Labadi neighbourhood of Accra to enforce curfew after reports of looting. While on patrol, he shot and killed neighbourhood resident Peter Atsu Bieboo, a fellow Ghana Armed Forces member on his way to buy kenkey with his brother. As a result, Kojo was tried for murder. A fellow prisoner stated that Kojo was at first confident that he would be released, but instead he was found guilty, and was executed on 29 September 1984.

Rawlings was targeted by allegations that he showed favouritism towards friends caught up in the legal system, allegations that even the executions of his friends such as Kojo Lee failed to silence. Even after the executions of Lee and Rawlings' other close friend Joachim Amartey Quaye, rumours claimed that the executions had not actually been carried out; Riad Hozaifeh later testified to the National Reconciliation Commission that the PNDC then instructed him to film future executions for documentary purposes. Lee's wife also died soon after their son Kojo's death. Lee's other son Jeffrey moved back to the United States, where he joined the United States Agency for International Development and later served a stint in Ghana before returning to Virginia; Lee would later describe him as "an African learning how to be an American". However, Lee himself chose to remain in Ghana. In the aftermath, he stated: "Everyone thinks I should be angry, I should be this or I should be that ... I just know that living in this society, where I am living now, I feel better. I feel like a person."

== Later activities ==
Lee would go on to set up a student hostel programme and guest house, hoping to provide inexpensive accommodation for international students from other parts of Africa. He also invested in a variety of other projects, including a farm and a driving range. He retired from his dental practice in 2002. In 2007, he donated photographs of Kwame Nkrumah that he had taken in his days at Lincoln University to the Kwame Nkrumah Mausoleum in preparation for the country's Golden Jubilee celebrating the 50th anniversary of independence. In his aging years, he continued to pay attention to developments in the United States, in particular Barack Obama's presidential campaign and subsequent election in 2008. During Obama's presidential visit to Ghana in 2009, he stated that he was happy to see that the United States was making progress, but felt that "Ghana had made progress long before the United States". The University of Ghana-Legon awarded him an honorary doctorate in 2008 to recognise his distinguished contribution to public service, making him the second American to whom they had granted such a degree, after W. E. B. Du Bois.

== Death and funeral ==
Lee died aged 90 at his home in Labone, Accra, on 5 July 2010. He was survived by his son Jeffrey Randall Lee, his daughter-in-law Naa Ofeibia Saakwa-Mante Lee (the widow of his other son Robert Lowry Lee), four grandchildren – Nana Yao Ababio Lee (whose mother was the first wife of Robert Lowry Lee), Irma Lee, Shekila Lee and Naa Kwale Jones-Quartey (first daughter of Naa Ofeibia Saakwa-Mante Lee, adopted by Robert Lowry Lee) – and two great-grandchildren. Lee was laid in state and then given a funeral service at the Du Bois Centre in Accra on 24 July 2010.
