= Bob Lee =

Bob Lee may refer to:

== Sports ==
- Bob Lee (Australian footballer) (1927–2001), SANFL football administrator
- Bob Lee (baseball) (1937–2020), baseball pitcher
- Bob Lee (footballer, born 1953), English footballer
- Bob Lee (guard) (1935–2017), American football player
- Bob Lee (quarterback) (1945–2026), American football player

== Others ==
- Bob Lee (businessman) (1979–2023), murdered American tech executive
- Bob Lee, deceased oil producer, known for the construction of the Cape Romano Dome House
- Bob Lee, character in The Airmail Mystery
- Bob Lee, drummer of The Gits

== See also ==
- Bob Ley (born 1955), American sports anchor and reporter
- Bobby Lee (disambiguation)
- Robert Lee (disambiguation)
- Robbie Lee (disambiguation)
