= Herbert Lee =

Herbert Lee may refer to:

- Herbert Lee (cricketer) (1856–1908), English cricketer
- Herbert Lee (activist) (1912–1961), American civil rights activist
- Herbert Lee (cyclist) (1887–1980), British cyclist

== See also ==
- Bert Lee (disambiguation)
