= Harry and the Hendersons =

1987 film by William Dear

- Theatrical release poster by Mick McGinty
- Directed by: William Dear
- Written by: William Dear; William E. Martin; Ezra D. Rappaport
- Produced by: William Dear; Richard Vane
- Starring: John Lithgow; Melinda Dillon; Don Ameche; David Suchet; Margaret Langrick; Joshua Rudoy; Lainie Kazan; Kevin Peter Hall
- Cinematography: Allen Daviau
- Edited by: Donn Cambern
- Music by: Bruce Broughton
- Production companies: Universal Pictures; Amblin Entertainment
- Distributed by: Universal Pictures
- Release date: June 5, 1987 (United States)
- Running time: 110 minutes
- Country: United States
- Language: English
- Budget: $10 million
- Box office: $50 million

Harry and the Hendersons is a 1987 American fantasy comedy film directed and produced by William Dear and starring John Lithgow, Melinda Dillon, Don Ameche, David Suchet, Margaret Langrick, Joshua Rudoy, Lainie Kazan, and Kevin Peter Hall. Steven Spielberg served as its uncredited executive producer, while Rick Baker provided the makeup and the creature designs for Harry. The film tells the story of a Seattle family bringing a Bigfoot home. In conjunction with the film's setting, shooting took place at several locations in the Cascade Range of Washington state near Interstate 90 and the town of Index near US 2, as well as Seattle's Wallingford, Ballard and Beacon Hill neighborhoods and other locations in or around Seattle.

Harry and the Hendersons grossed $50 million worldwide. It won an Oscar for Best Makeup at the 60th Academy Awards, and inspired a television spin-off of the same name. In the United Kingdom, the film was originally released as Bigfoot and the Hendersons, though the television series retained the American title. The DVD and all current showings of the film in the UK now refer to the film by its original title.

== Plot ==
Following a camping trip in the nearby Cascade mountains, the Henderson family: George, his wife Nancy, and their children Sarah and Ernie, travel home to Seattle. However, George hits a Bigfoot with his station wagon. Believing it to be dead and the key to fame and fortune, George straps the creature to the roof of the car. Meanwhile, legendary French Canadian hunter-turned-Bigfoot-tracker Jacques LaFleur discovers their detached license plate.

That night, George goes to examine the Bigfoot and discovers it was alive and has escaped. He finds the creature in the kitchen. The family soon realizes that he is intelligent and friendly, and George decides to return him to the wilderness. Naming the Bigfoot "Harry", George tries to lure him into the station wagon with food, but Harry becomes upset and runs off.

Saddened, the family attempts to resume their normal lives, but sightings of Harry become more frequent as local media hysteria heightens. George tries to find Harry and visits the "North American Museum of Anthropology" to speak with Dr. Wallace Wrightwood, a supposed expert on Bigfoot. Giving his phone number to the museum clerk, George resumes his search. Jacques LaFleur eventually finds the Henderson household. George follows a Bigfoot sighting into the city while Harry evades hunters and the police as he attempts to find safety. George saves Harry from LaFleur, who is arrested, and reunites him with the Henderson family.

George invites Dr. Wrightwood to dinner. When answering the door, George recognizes Wrightwood as the museum clerk. Wrightwood urges the Hendersons to give up on Bigfoot as it has destroyed his life; he meets Harry, restoring his enthusiasm. Bailed out of jail, LaFleur travels to the Henderson household. Harry and the Hendersons escape with Dr. Wrightwood in his truck, and LaFleur gives chase. Fleeing to the mountains, George tries to force Harry to leave. Confused and upset, Harry departs, but LaFleur tracks and attempts to shoot him. Harry subdues LaFleur, and George intervenes when LaFleur attempts to escape. LaFleur gives up the hunt when he realizes that Harry is more than a simple beast.

As the family says goodbye, George tells Harry to take care of himself, to which he replies, "Okay" – revealing he has the ability to speak. As Harry leaves, three other hiding Bigfoot emerge and they all disappear into the wilderness.

== Cast ==
- John Lithgow as George Henderson Jr.
- Melinda Dillon as Nancy Henderson
- Margaret Langrick as Sarah Henderson
- Joshua Rudoy as Ernie Henderson
- Kevin Peter Hall as Harry (in-suit performer)
  - Fred Newman as Harry (voice)
  - Rick Baker as Harry (puppeteer)
  - Tom Hester as Harry (puppeteer)
  - Tim Lawrence as Harry (puppeteer)
  - Mitch Laue as the UNC Wilmington Legend (puppeteer)
- Lainie Kazan as Irene Moffat
- Don Ameche as Dr. Wallace Wrightwood
- David Suchet as Jacques LaFleur
- M. Emmet Walsh as George Henderson Sr.
- William Ontiveros as Sergeant Mancini
- William Dear as Sighting Man
- Laurie O'Brien as Screaming Woman
- John Bloom as Other Sasquatches
- Debbie Lee Carrington as Little Sasquatch
- Britches as Bob "Little Bob"
- William Frankfather as Schwarz
- Robert Isaac Lee as Kim Lee

== Music ==
Bruce Broughton composed the film's original score, and co-wrote "Love Lives On" with Barry Mann (music), Cynthia Weil (lyrics) and Will Jennings (lyrics), performed by Joe Cocker over the end credits (in place of Broughton's planned end title cue); the soundtrack version of "Love Lives On" has a saxophone solo and was later released as a single. MCA Records released a soundtrack album on record and cassette; in 2007, Intrada Records issued an expanded album, marking the music's premiere CD release, with the exceptions of the original album version of "Love Lives On" and "Your Feet's Too Big".

=== 1987 MCA soundtrack album ===
Side one
No.	Title	Length
1.	"Love Lives On" (Joe Cocker)	3:49
2.	"Main Title"	3:05
3.	"Some Dumb Thing"	2:28
4.	"Irene!"	1:26
5.	"Harry in the House"	4:20
6.	"Harry Takes Off"	3:20

Side two
No.	Title	Length
1.	"Your Feet's Too Big" (Jimmy Walker; arr. Chris Boardman)	3:15
2.	"Drawing Harry"	1:49
3.	"Taking Harry Home"	2:57
4.	"Foot Prints"	4:19
5.	"Goodbyes"	4:07
6.	"Harry and the Hendersons"	3:28

=== 2007 Intrada album ===
The album begins with the film version of "Love Lives On", which has a flute solo, rather than the guitar heard on the single and on the 1987 soundtrack album.

No.	Title	Length
1.	"Love Lives On" (Joe Cocker)	3:51
2.	"Main Title"	5:41
3.	"Taking Harry Home"	4:33
4.	"Harry in the House"	6:22
5.	"Night Prowler"	1:01
6.	"Some Dumb Thing"	3:16
7.	"Irene!"	1:26
8.	"Eye to Eye"	0:54
9.	"Our Little Pet"	1:36
10.	"Tracking Harry"	1:37
11.	"Harry Takes Off"	3:19
12.	"Big Freeway"	1:39
13.	"Sasquatch"	1:01
14.	"The Great Outdoors"	1:55
15.	"Bigfoot Museum"	0:59
16.	"Planning the Hunt"	2:03
17.	"Drawing Harry"	1:48
18.	"Night Pursuit"	9:52
19.	"First Things First"	1:41
20.	"Wrightwood Meets Harry"	1:29
21.	"Bed Pals"	0:43
22.	"Traffic Jam!"	7:14
23.	"Footprints"	4:19
24.	"Goodbyes"	4:06
25.	"Harry and the Hendersons"	3:27

Personnel on "Love Lives On"

- Joe Cocker – vocals
- Robbie Kilgore – keyboards
- Dan Hartman – additional keyboards
- Phil Grande – all guitars
- Kevin Totoian – bass
- David Beal – drums
- Michael Brecker – tenor saxophone solo
- Lawrence Feldman – tenor saxophone intro and ending

== Production ==
William E. Martin first described the concept that he had developed with Ezra D. Rappaport to William Dear at a cocktail party in 1978, detailing it as the story of a friendly sasquatch who moves in with a typical American family. In 1982, after the critical and commercial failure of Timerider: The Adventure of Lyle Swann, Dear met with Martin again and asked what became of his Harry and the Hendersons script, which Martin and Rappaport had envisioned as a sitcom in the vein of The Munsters or The Addams Family, with Harry living with the Hendersons as a "big dumb cousin" and getting into conflicts hiding from the neighbors. Dear acquired the script from Martin and Rappaport and began refining it as a feature film. Rick Baker designed the titular Harry, after initially declining due to his work load, allowing Dear to have both a finished script and designs ready to present the film to studios as a package.

On the suggestion of Allen Daviau, Steven Spielberg hired Dear to direct the Amazing Stories episode "Mummy Daddy." Spielberg was impressed by Dear's direction and script work, and asked Dear about his forthcoming film projects, which lead to Harry and the Hendersons being set up at Spielberg's Amblin Productions. The prospect of working with Spielberg proved to be a point of contention for Baker, as he carried animosity towards Spielberg over the production of the unproduced Night Skies, which Speilberg reworked into E.T. the Extra-Terrestrial. Dear assured Baker that since they started the movie together they would finish it together, and if Baker couldn't reconcile with Spielberg they'd take the project elsewhere; ultimately Baker and Spielberg reconciled.

Dear had to fight for his choice of John Lithgow as George Henderson, as the studio wanted a bigger name to market the movie. Lithgow initially turned down the role of George, due to feeling that the first draft called for George to act "too ridiculous"; upon seeing a drawing of Harry (which appears in the film as the portrait George draws), Lithgow complimented the design and said he'd be interested in looking at a second draft, which ultimately convinced him to sign on.

== Reception ==
=== Box office ===
Harry and the Hendersons opened third behind Beverly Hills Cop II and The Untouchables. It went on to gross $29.8 million at the North American box office and $20.2 million internationally for a total of $50 million worldwide.

=== Critical response ===
Harry and the Hendersons earned mixed reviews from professional critics. On Rotten Tomatoes, the film has an approval rating of 50% based on reviews from 22 critics. Metacritic, which uses a weighted average, assigned the film a score of 42 out of 100, based on 10 critics, indicating "mixed or average" reviews.

Michael Wilmington of the Los Angeles Times commended Lithgow's performance and the film's "technical triumphs", the latter of which he noted "seem to overpower its weak, juiceless ... gags". Dave Kehr, writing for The Chicago Tribune, wrote that the film "takes a leisurely spin through the standard Spielberg themes, without gathering the visual grandeur or emotional extravagance that are Spielberg's trademarks". Both Wilmington and Kehr noted an influence of Spielberg on director William Dear, with Wilmington calling Dear "a film maker immersing himself so thoroughly in the sensibility of another that he disappears--like a drowning man sinking slowly beneath waves of chocolate"; Kehr wrote that "[Dear's] personality seems wholly subsumed by Spielberg's."

Siskel and Ebert reviewed Harry and the Hendersons negatively on their syndicated TV show, with a "two thumbs down" assessment. Gene Siskel said the story was repetitive and "a very manipulative movie that anyone who's seen E.T. has seen before". Roger Ebert similarly said young children might enjoy the film, but he found it unimpressive: "What it lacks is any sense of awe about the fact there could be a Bigfoot, an unknown creature living in the woods with a mind of its own, [...] Harry is so cute, so gentle, so lovable that there is no sense of mystery and no sense of awe. There's no belief that he's really Bigfoot."

In 2007, Slant Magazine's Eric Henderson gave the film a score of two out of four stars, writing that "Just as Mac and Me eventually devolved into a feature-length commercial for McDonald's, Harry and the Hendersons eventually emerges as a vegetarian screed."

=== Awards ===
Year	Award	Category	Recipient	Result	Ref(s)
1988	Academy Award	Best Makeup	Rick Baker	Won	

== Home media ==
The film was released in December 1987 on LaserDisc, and was also released on VHS. It was later released on DVD in January 2011. A single-disc Blu-ray of the film was released on March 4, 2014.

== Television spin-off ==
The film had a television series spin-off, also called Harry and the Hendersons. Kevin Peter Hall reprised Harry until his death in 1991. After that, Harry was performed by Dawan Scott in 1991–1992 and by Brian Steele in 1992–1993. Harry's vocal effects were provided by Patrick Pinney. Leon Redbone's version of "Your Feet's Too Big" was used as its theme song.
