= Robert Leigh =

Robert Leigh may refer to:

- Robert Leigh (physicist), Canadian physicist
- Robert K. Leigh (1852–c. 1924), English-born Hong Kong architect and civil engineer
- Robert Holt Leigh (1762–1843), British member of parliament
- Robert Devore Leigh (1890–1961), American political scientist and founding president of Bennington College
- Robert Leigh (Irish politician), Parliament of Ireland MP for New Ross 1759–1801

== See also ==
- Robert Lee (disambiguation)
