= Bert Lee (disambiguation) =

Bert Lee (1880–1946) was a songwriter.

Bert or Bertram Lee may also refer to:

- Bert Lee (footballer) (1879–1958), English footballer
- Bert Lee (musician), pseudonym of American songwriter and musician Bert Lown (1903–1962)
- Bert Lee (sportscaster), on-air name of American sportscaster Bertram Lebhar Jr. (1907–1972)
- Bertram Lee, business partner of Peter Bynoe

== See also ==
- Albert Lee (disambiguation)
- Robert Lee (disambiguation)
- Herbert Lee (disambiguation)
- Hubert Lee, soldier
