= Robbie Lee =

Robbie Lee may refer to:

- Robbie Lee (diver), British athlete (born 2005)
- Robbie Lee (musician), American composer and multi-instrumentalist
- Robbie Lee (actress), American actress (born 1954)

== See also ==
- Bob Lee (disambiguation)
- Bobby Lee (disambiguation)
- Robert Lee (disambiguation)
