= Robert Isaac Lee =

Chinese-American actor (1956–2004)

- Born: Robert Alexander Isaac Lee; August 16, 1956; Gansu, China
- Died: October 20, 2004 (aged 48); Phoenix, Arizona, U.S.
- Other names: Bob, Robert I. Lee, Robert Lee
- Children: 3

Robert "Bob" Isaac Lee (August 16, 1956 – October 20, 2004) was a Chinese-American actor.

Robert was born Robert Alexander Isaac Lee in Gansu, China; he and his family had emigrated from China to the United States when Lee was 8 years old, moving to Sacramento, California.

Lee married Jenny Anne Wong on September 5, 1989. They had 3 children together: 1 son born 1990, a daughter in 1992 and a second son in 1994.

Lee died on October 20, 2004, in Phoenix, Arizona at the age of 48. His cause of death was noted as a heart attack.

== Filmography ==
- The Big Empty (2005) - Eskimo
- Soul Plane (2004) - Judge Pong
- Arrested Development (2003) (TV series) - Worker #1
- The X Files Game (1998) (VG) - James Wong
- Sliders (1995) (TV series) - FBI Agent Harold Yen
- The Vortex: Quantum Gate II (1994) (VG) (as Robert I. Lee) - Aylinde tribe leader
- Harry and the Hendersons (1987) - Kim Lee
- Trouble in Mind (1985) (as Robert Lee) - Ho
- The Rape of Richard Beck (1985) (TV) - Lew
