= Fort Amsterdam, Ghana =

Ghanaian fort

Fort Amsterdam
- Part of Dutch Gold Coast
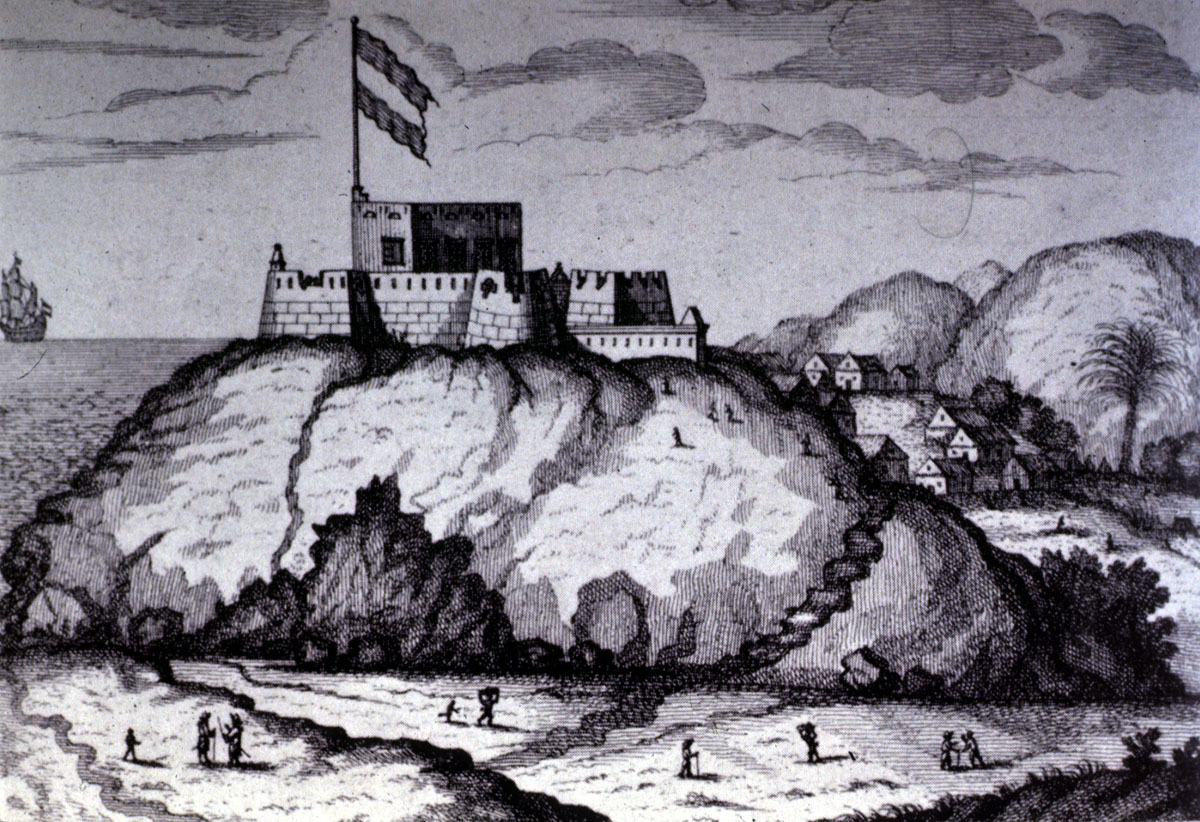
- Fort Amsterdam

Location
- Coordinates: 5.192222°N 1.093056°W

Site history
- Built: 1638

Garrison information
- Occupants: English (1631-1665); Netherlands (1665-1868)

UNESCO World Heritage Site
- Location: Abandze, Central Region, Ghana
- Part of: Forts and Castles, Volta, Greater Accra, Central and Western Regions
- Criteria: Cultural: (vi)
- Reference: 34-004
- Inscription: 1979 (3rd Session)

Fort Amsterdam is a former slave fort in Abandze, Central region, Ghana. It was built by the English between 1638 and 1645 as Fort Cormantin or Fort Courmantyne, and was captured by admiral Michiel de Ruyter of the Dutch West India Company in 1665, in retaliation for the capture of several Dutch forts by the English Admiral Holmes in 1664. It was subsequently made part of the Dutch Gold Coast, and remained part of it until the fort was traded with the British in 1868. The Fort is located at Abandze, on the north-east of Cape Coast in the Mfantseman District of the Central Region of Ghana. Because of its testimony to European economic and colonial influence in West Africa and its historical importance in the Atlantic slave trade, the fort was inscribed on the UNESCO World Heritage List in 1979 along with other forts and castles in Ghana.

== History ==
Early in 1782, Captain Thomas Shirley in the 50-gun ship Leander and the sloop-of-war Alligator sailed to the Dutch Gold Coast. This was during the Fourth Anglo-Dutch War in which Britain was at war with The Netherlands. Shirley captured the small Dutch forts at Moree (Fort Nassau – 20 guns), Kormantin (Courmantyne – 32 guns), Apam (Fort Lijdzaamheid or Fort Patience – 22 guns), Senya Beraku (Fort Goede Hoop – 18 guns), and Accra (Fort Crêvecoeur or Ussher Fort – 32 guns).

In 1811, the people of Anomabo, who happened to be allies of the British attacked the fort, leaving it in ruins. It was unoccupied from then until its restoration in 1951 by the Ghana Museums and Monuments Board.

The town of Abandze has grown around the site of the fort today.

== The original structure of Fort Amsterdam ==
It had a rectangular outline with two square and two round bastions at the corners. They were linked by curtain walls. There was a central courtyard. Arranged around it were a one-storeyed building on the west side, a two-storeyed building along the north side and a line of two or three storeyed buildings on the south side.

The curtain and bastion on the north were solidly built, while the others were constructed with an earth filling between two walls of stone laid in mortar. As a result of cracks and disintegration at the time, it was left unoccupied.

The bastion on the southeast, which was designed to be hollow, had a grated ventilation in the roof, and was in addition used as a slave prison. It is believed to have been the first of its kind in the Gold Coast. Slaves taken from this fort were said to have been named Coromantee.

== Trade ==
From 1705 to 1716, trade figures at the fort were given as 481 marks of gold and 149 slaves. There were complaints of little trade at other times as well. This was due to wars and also because the local chief was said to have leased the site to the British, and not the Dutch. The Dutch had no jurisdiction there, and the Cormantin people blocked their trade routes whenever it suited them, until the former had paid huge sums of money.

== Image gallery ==
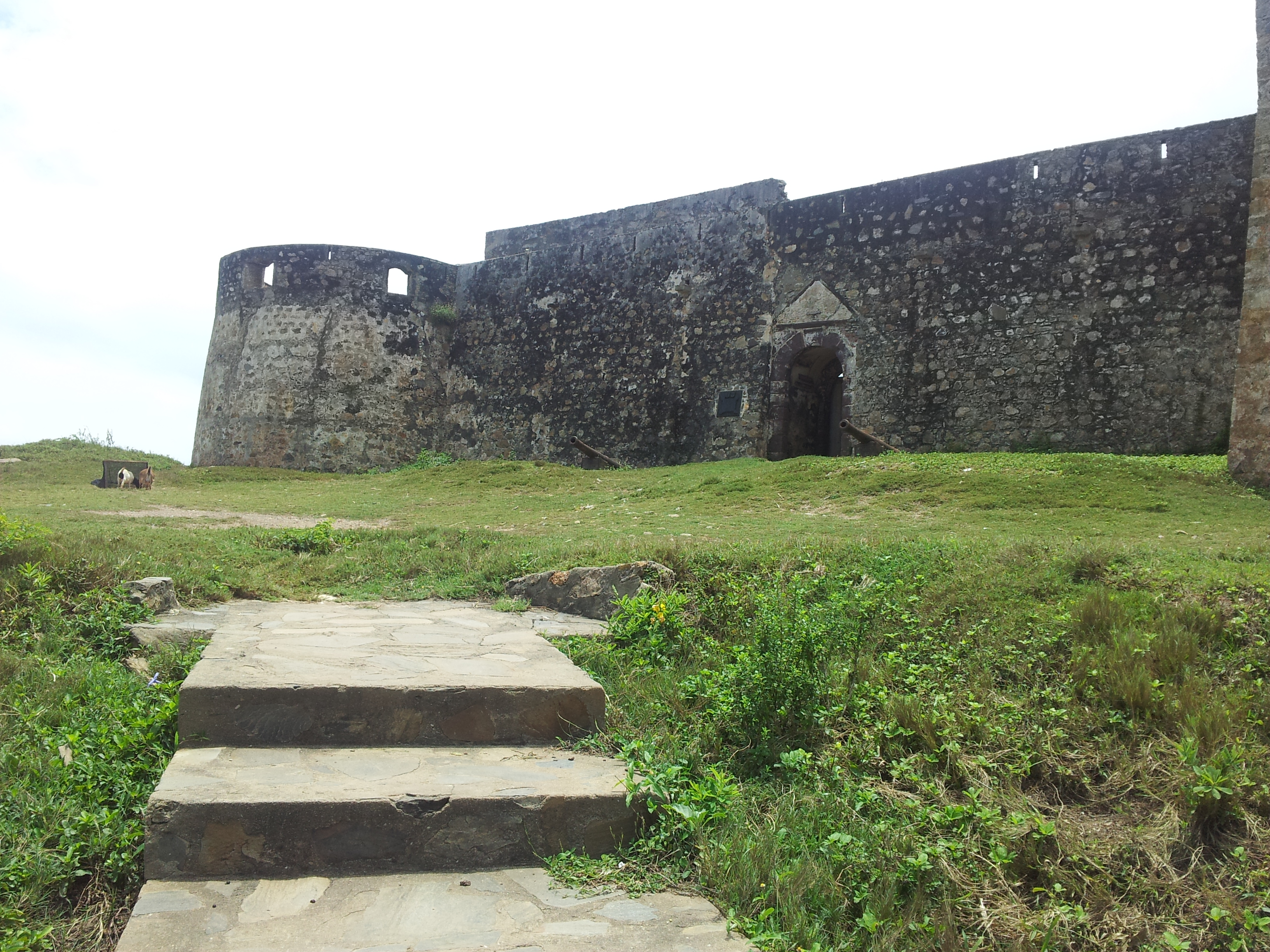
Fort Amsterdam front view

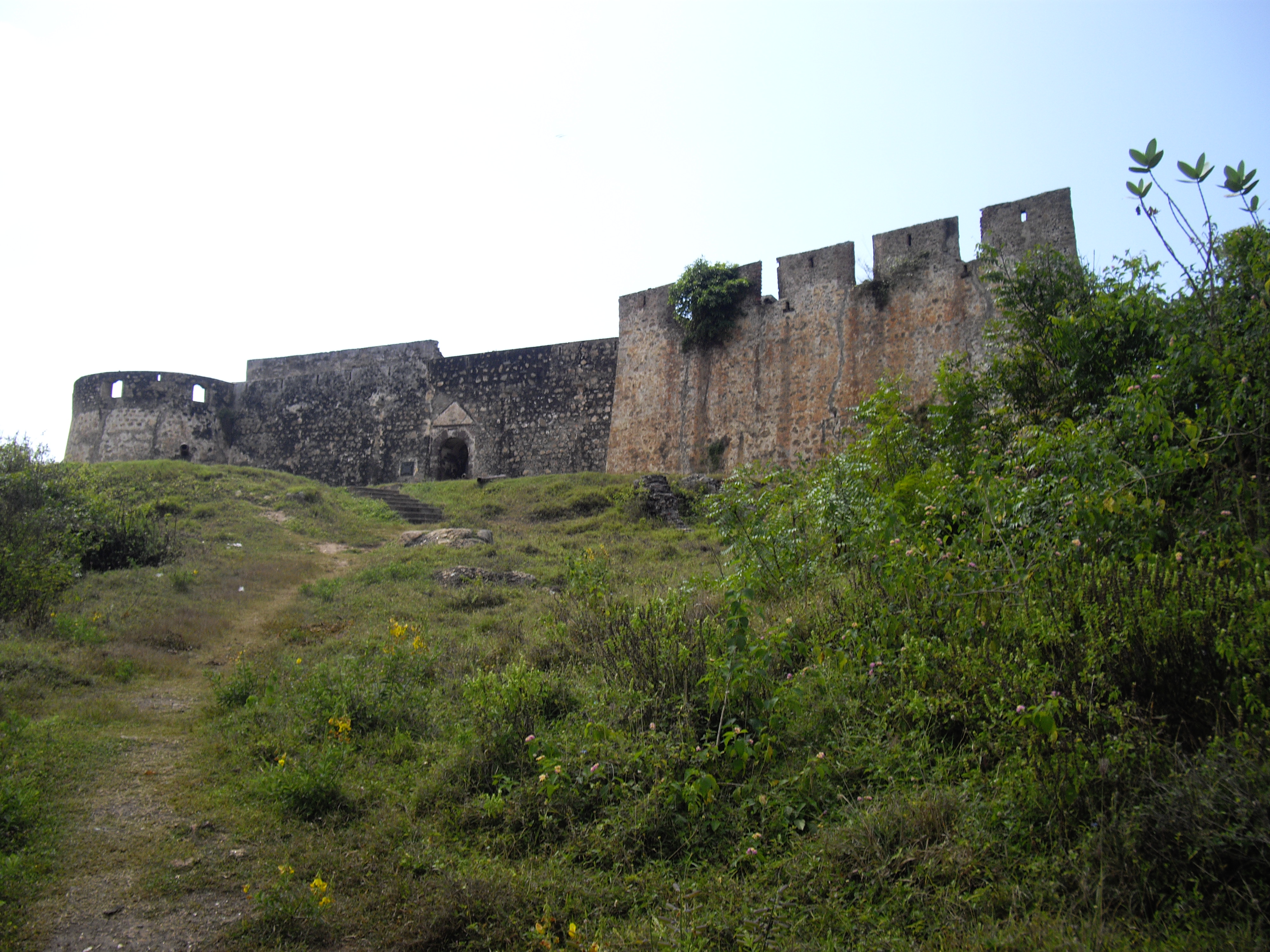
Main gate

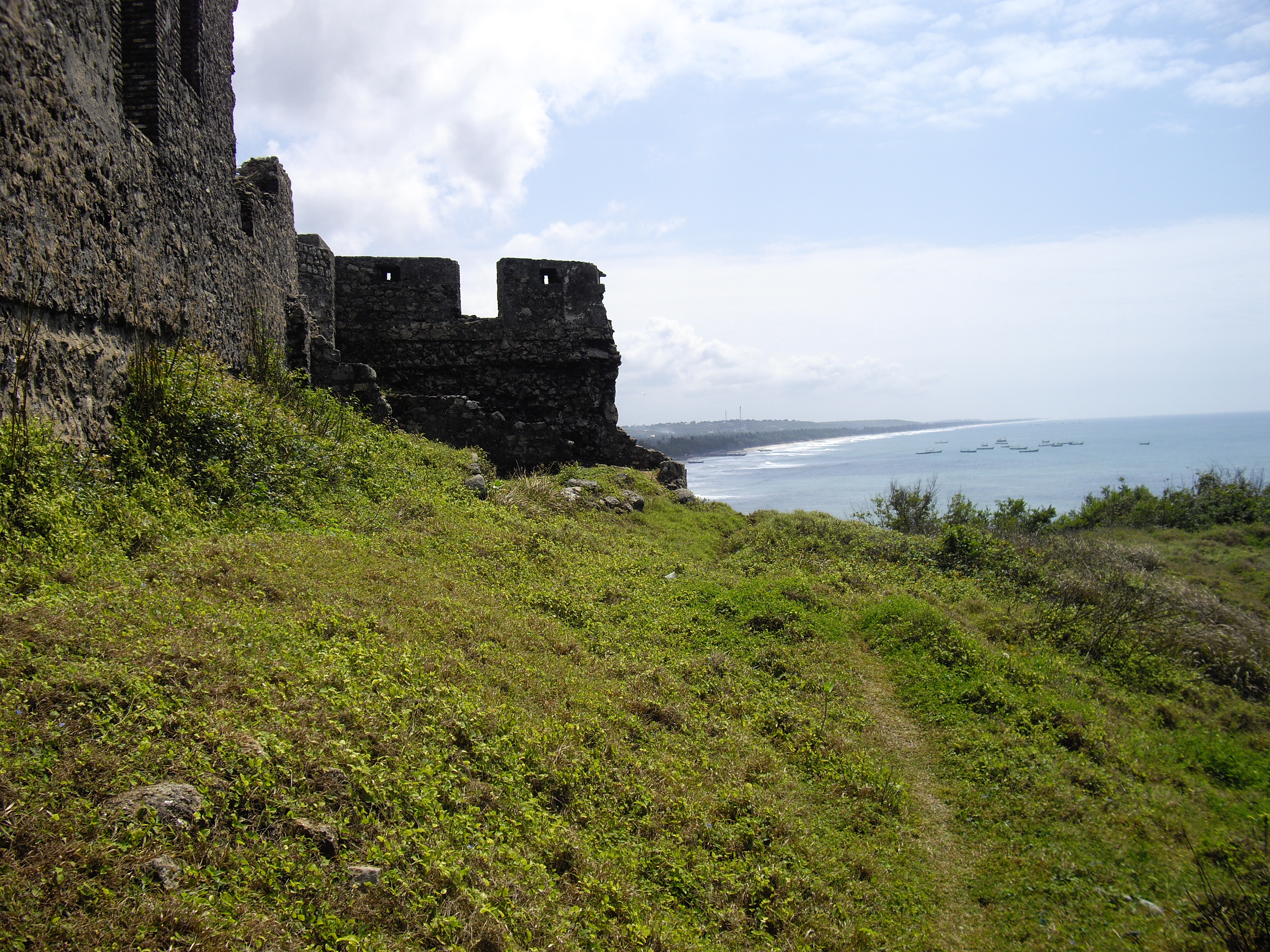
Fort Amsterdam

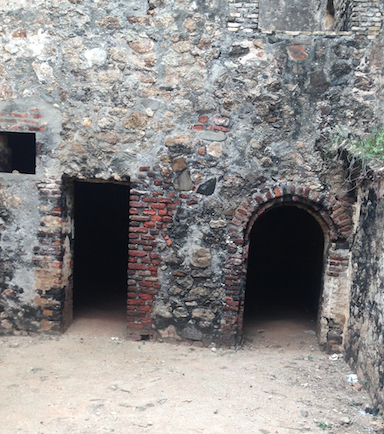
Slave Dungeon in Fort Amsterdam

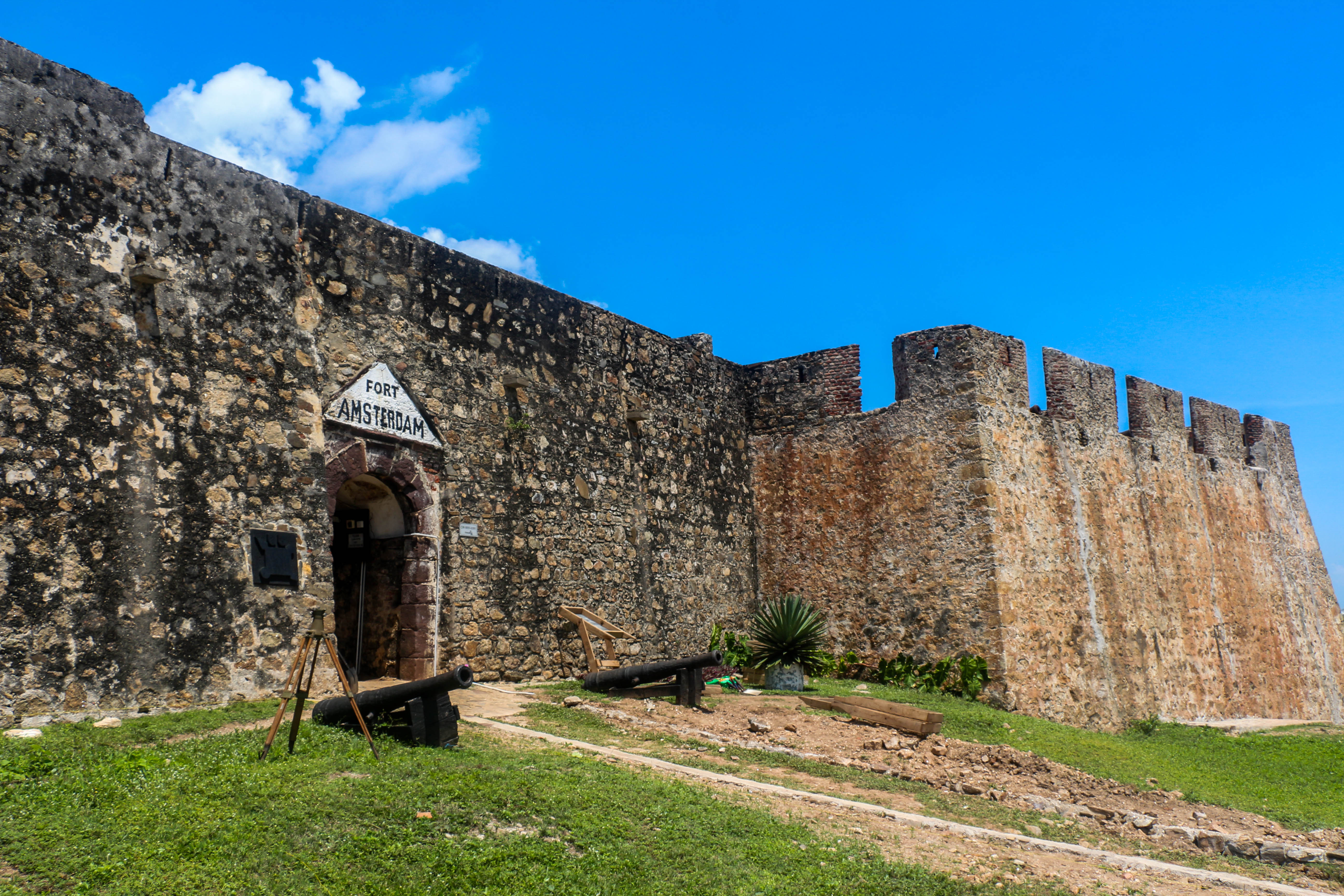
Side front view of Fort Amsterdam in Ghana

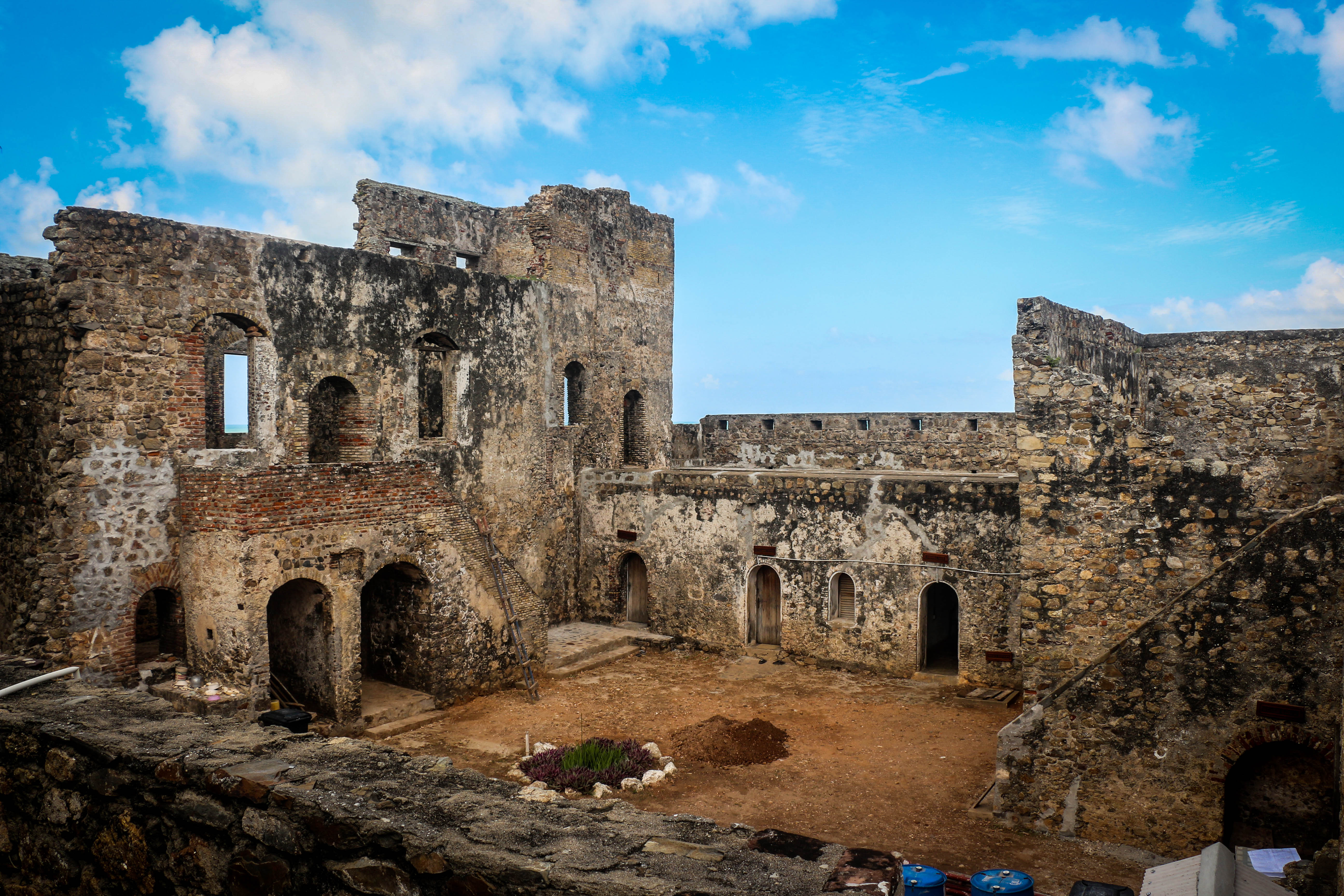
Fort Amsterdam, Ghana

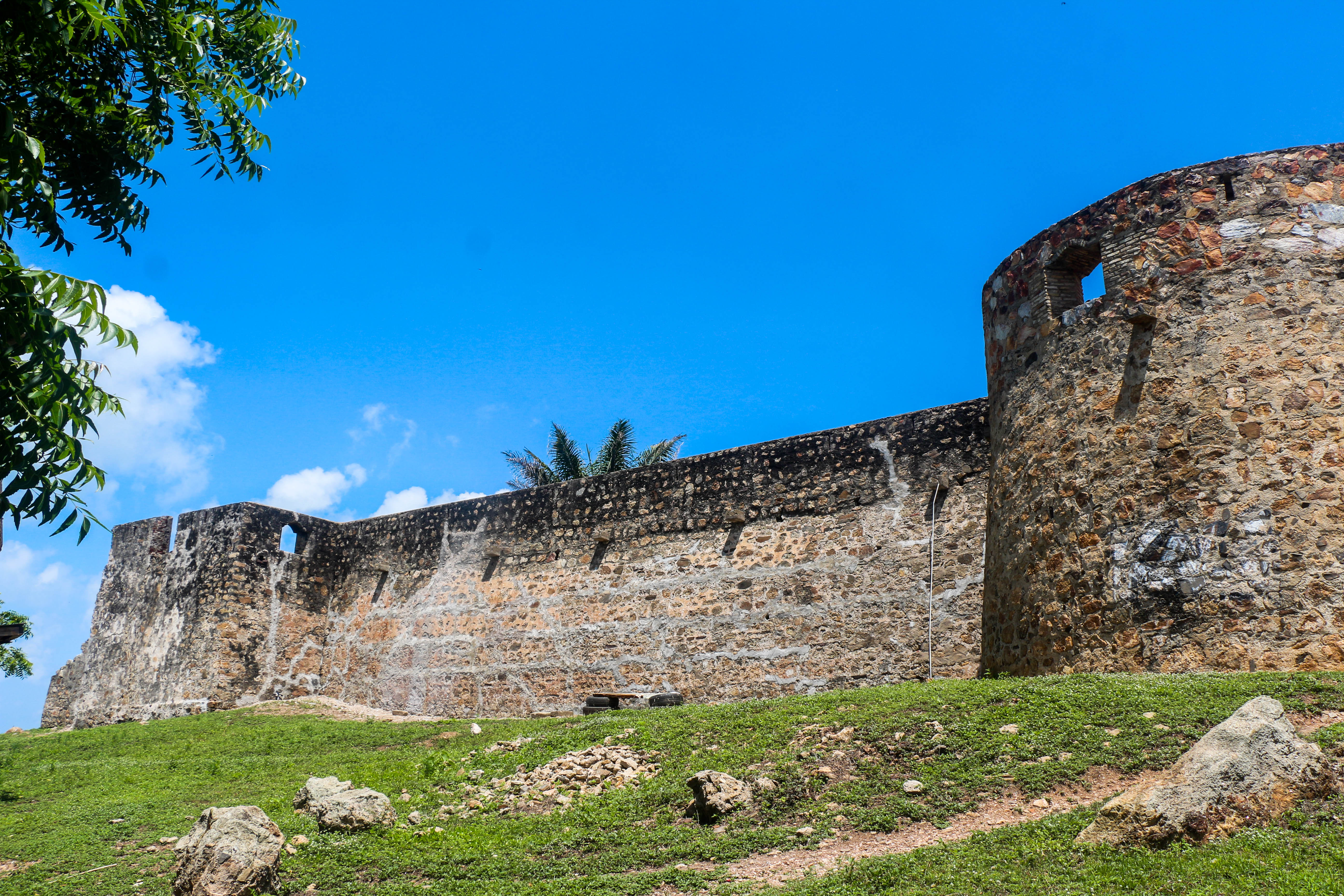
Fort Amsterdam in Ghana

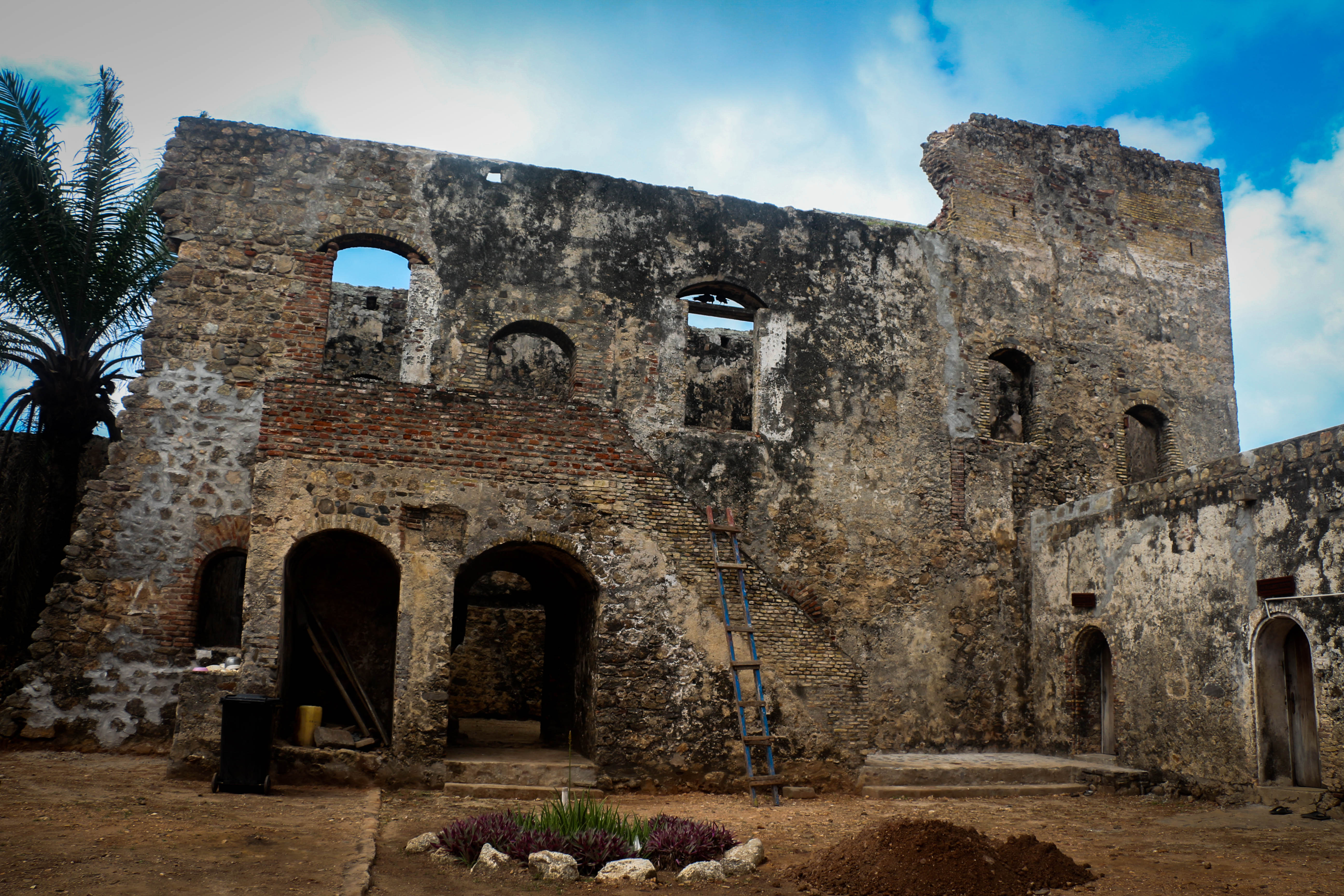
Fort Amsterdam in Ghana

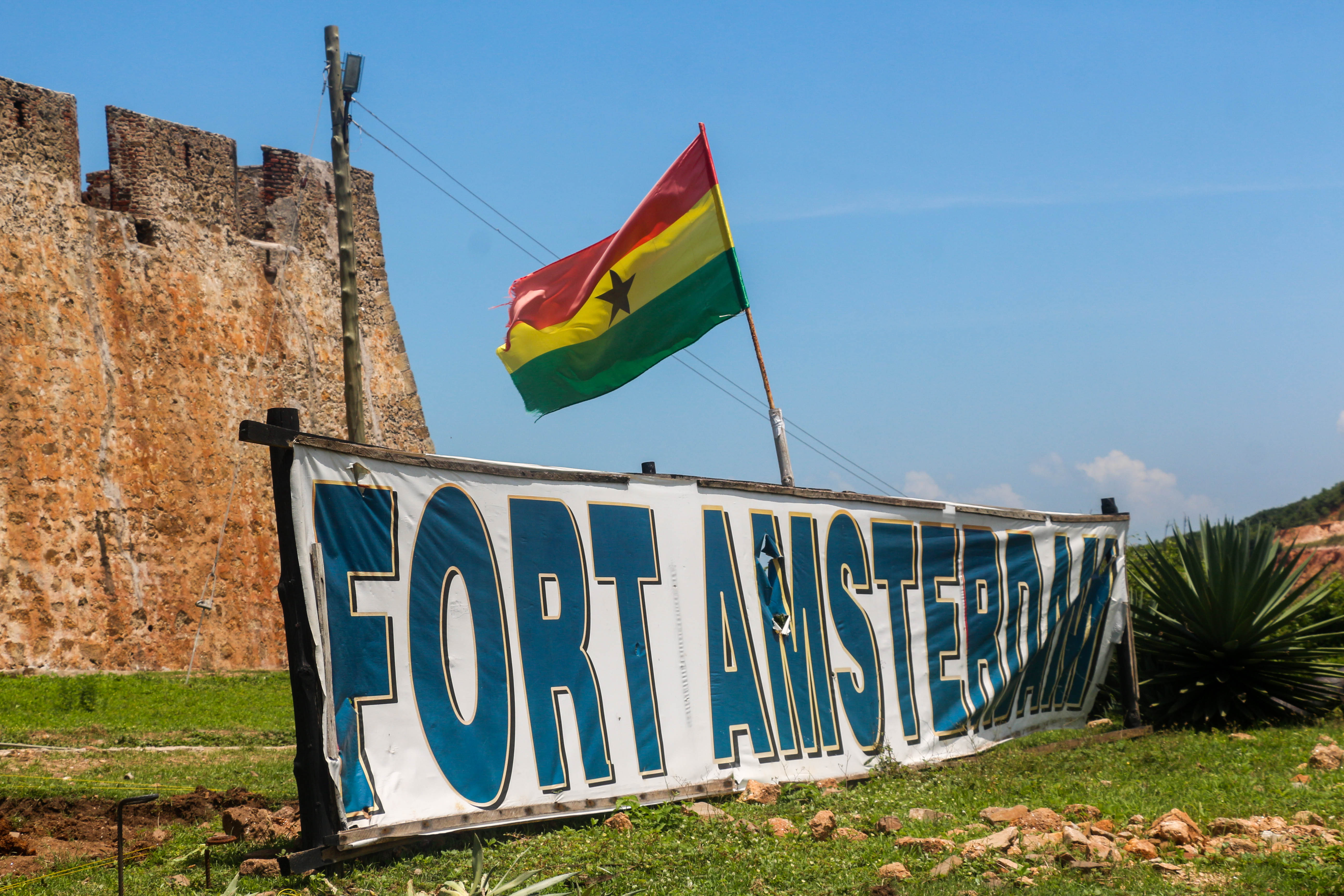
Front view of Fort Amsterdam

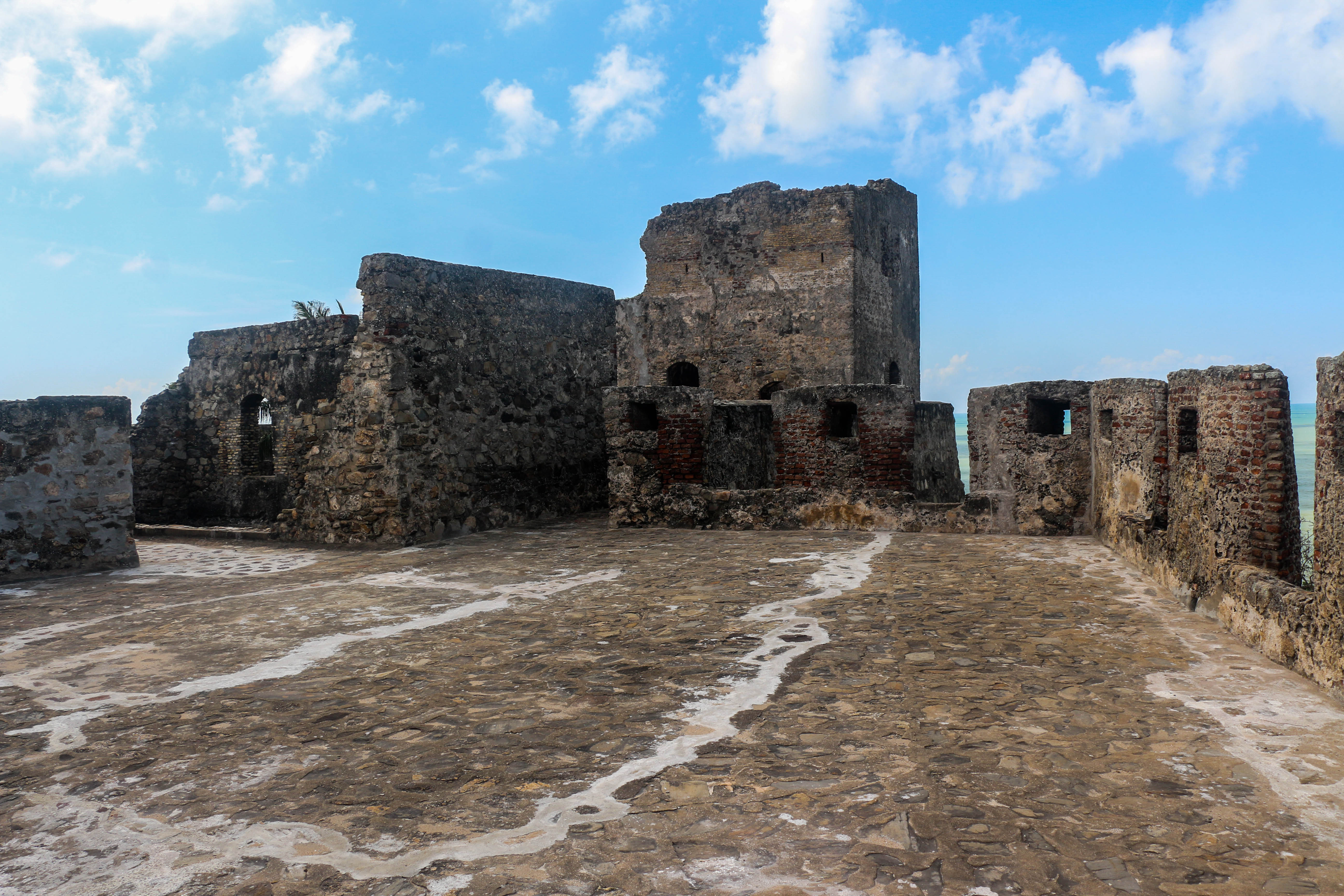
Fort Amsterdam in Ghana

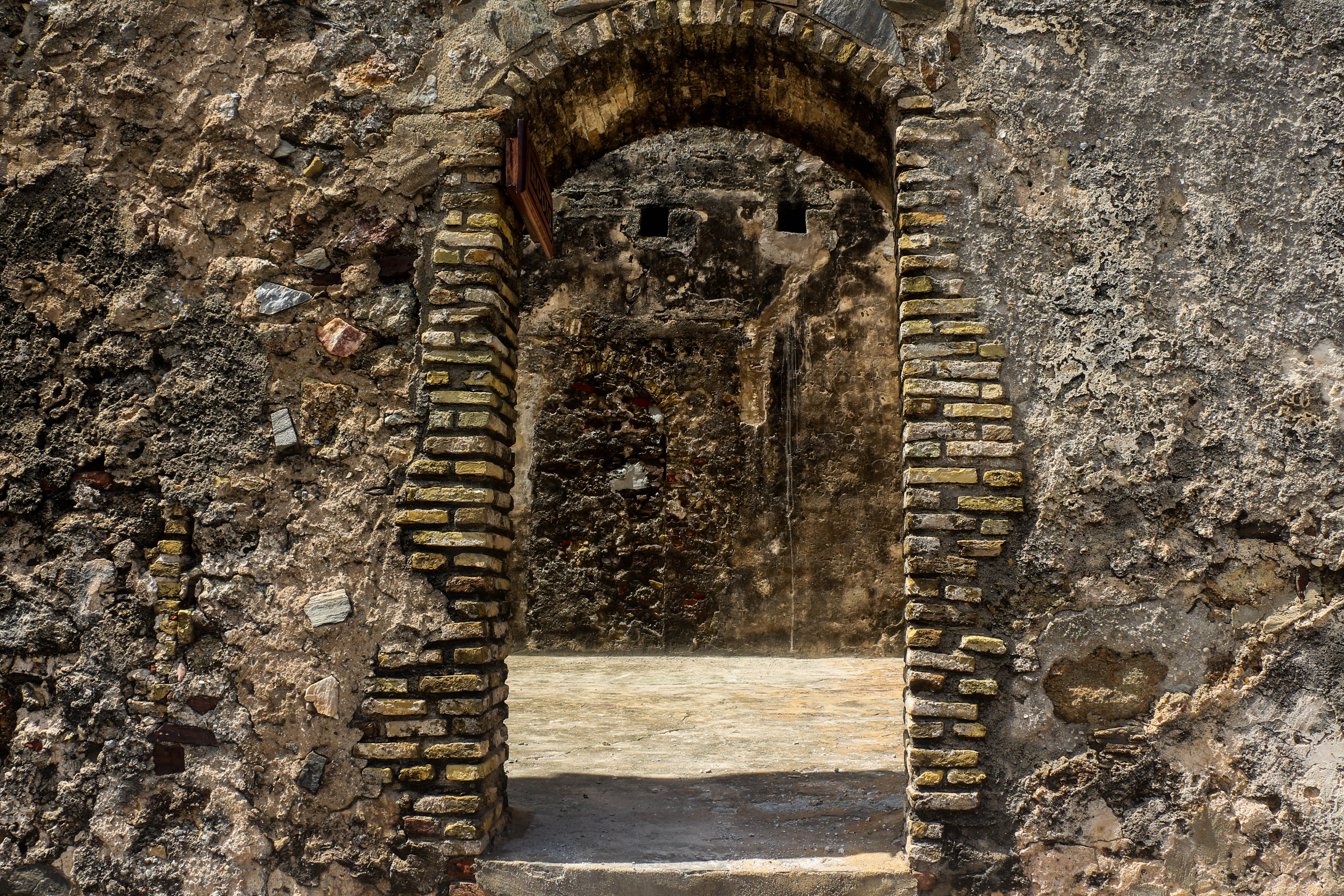
Fort Amsterdam

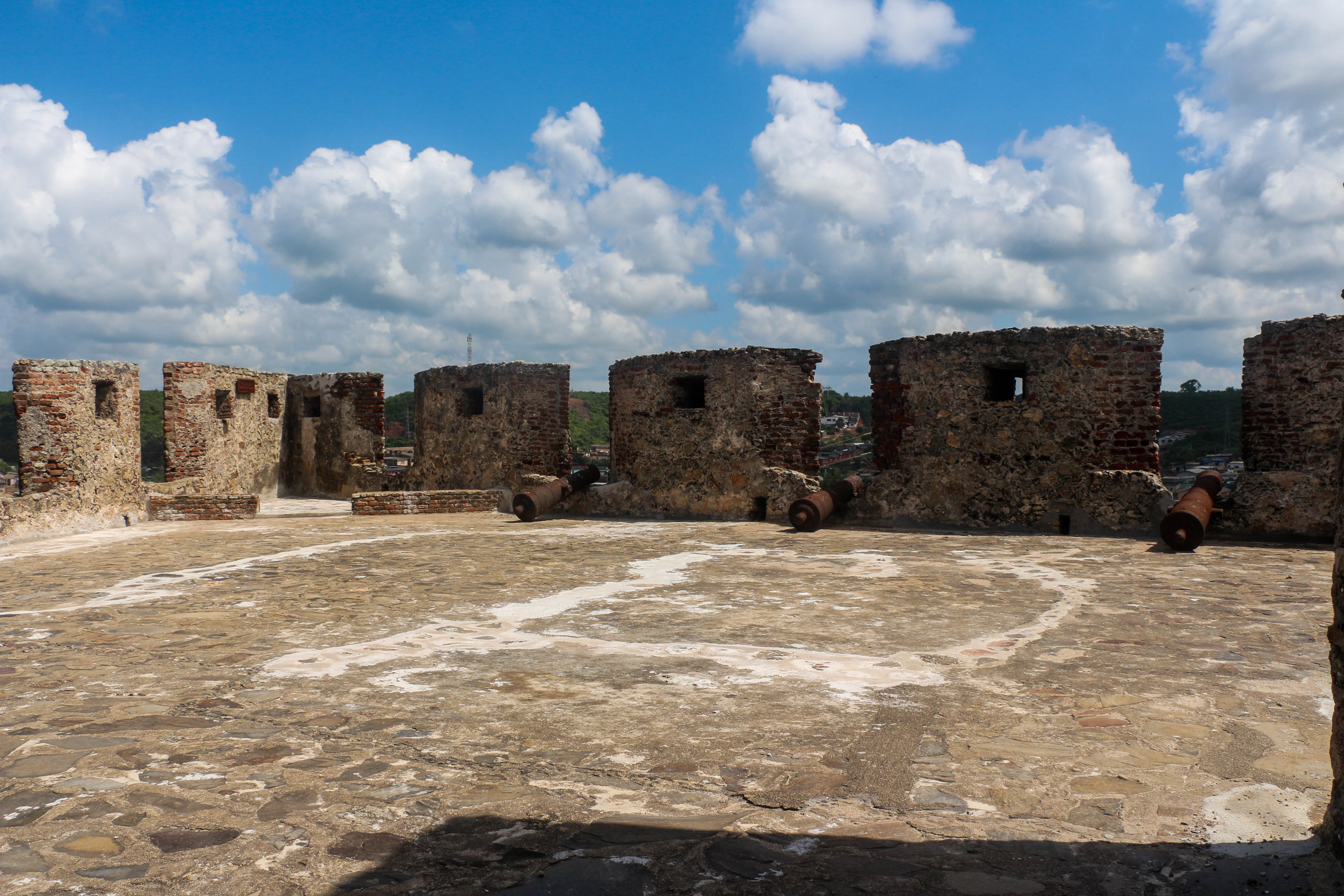
Fort Amsterdam

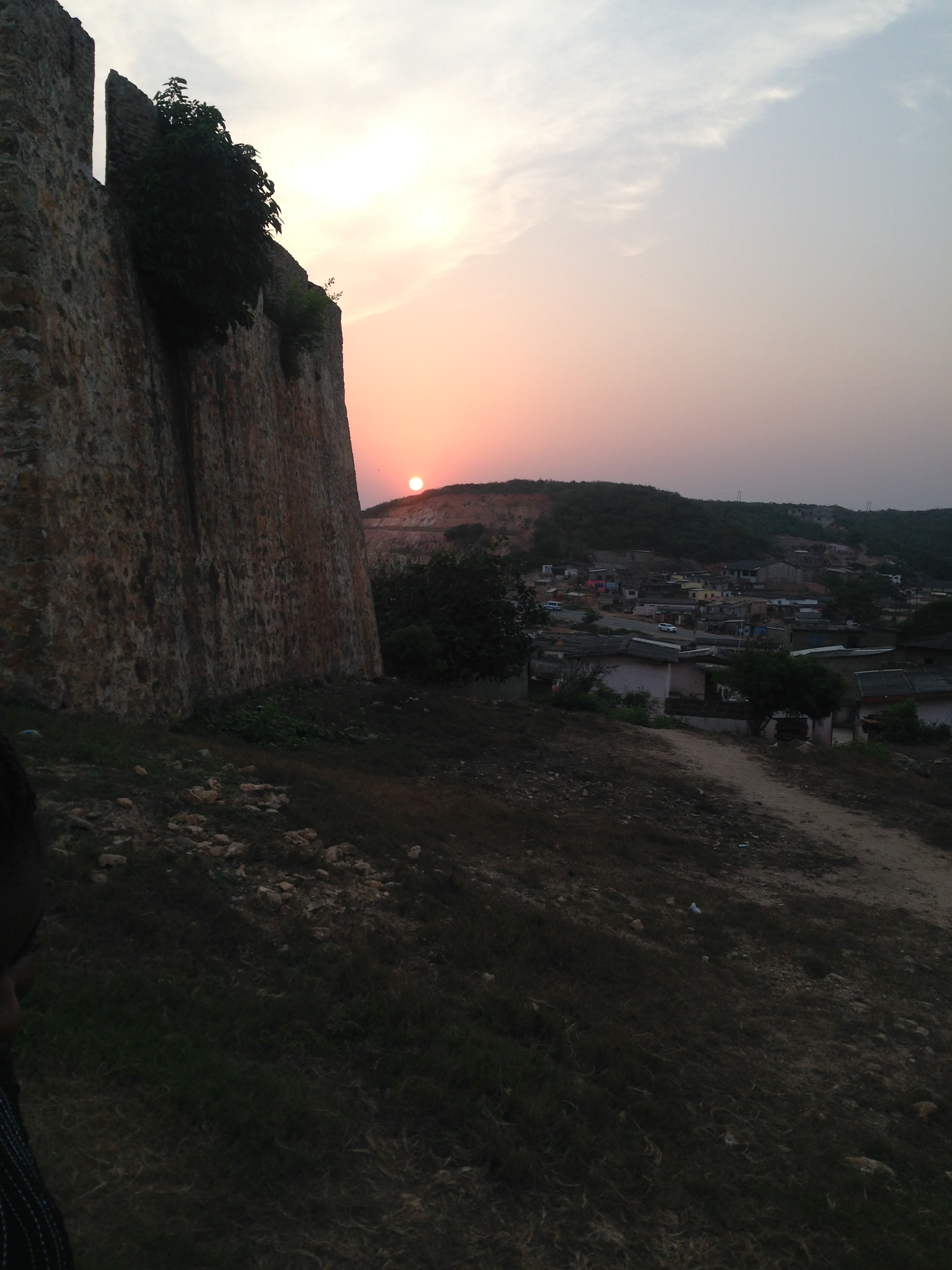
Sunset at the Fort Amsterdam

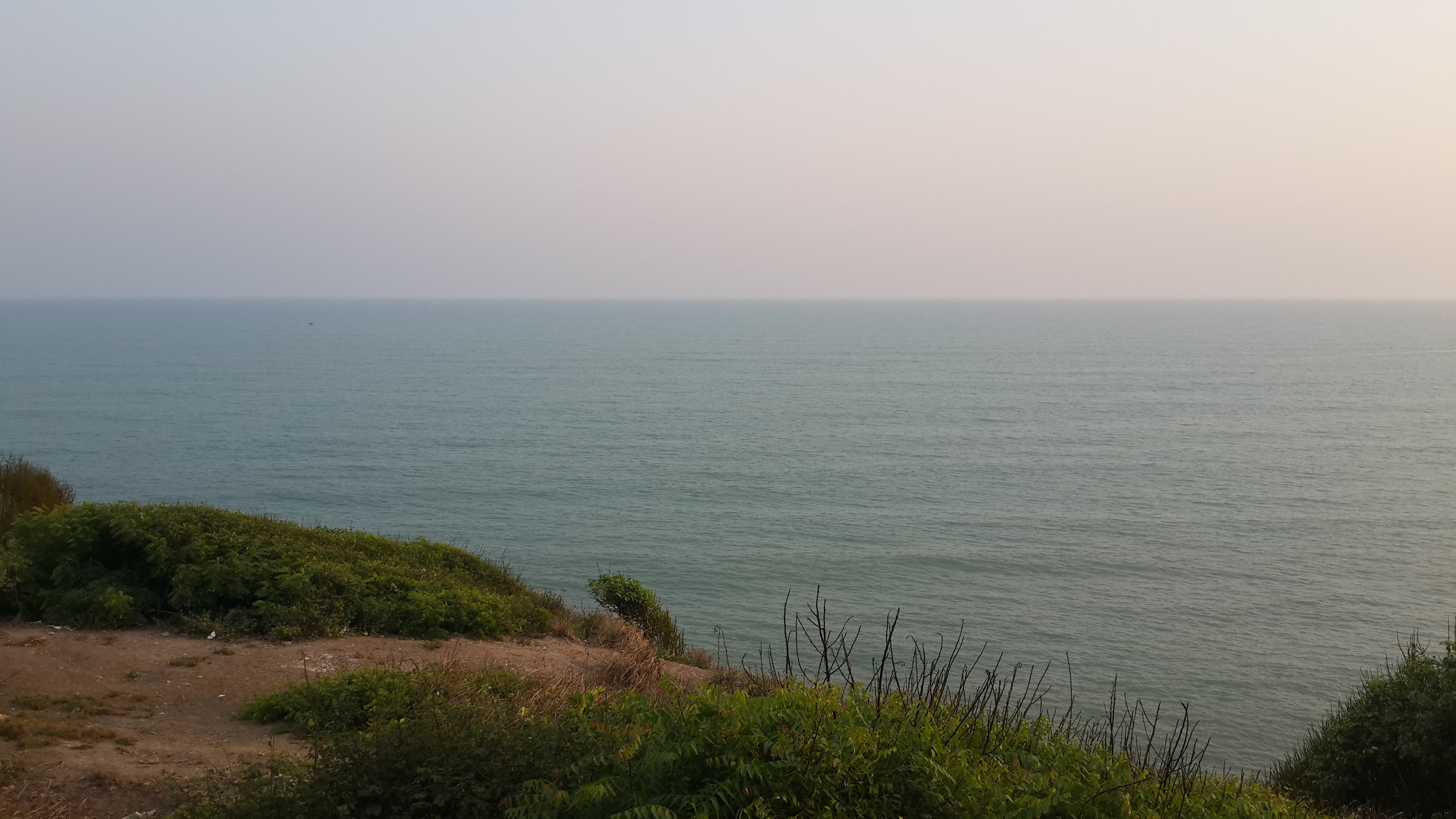
Komantin Beach From Fort Amsterdam

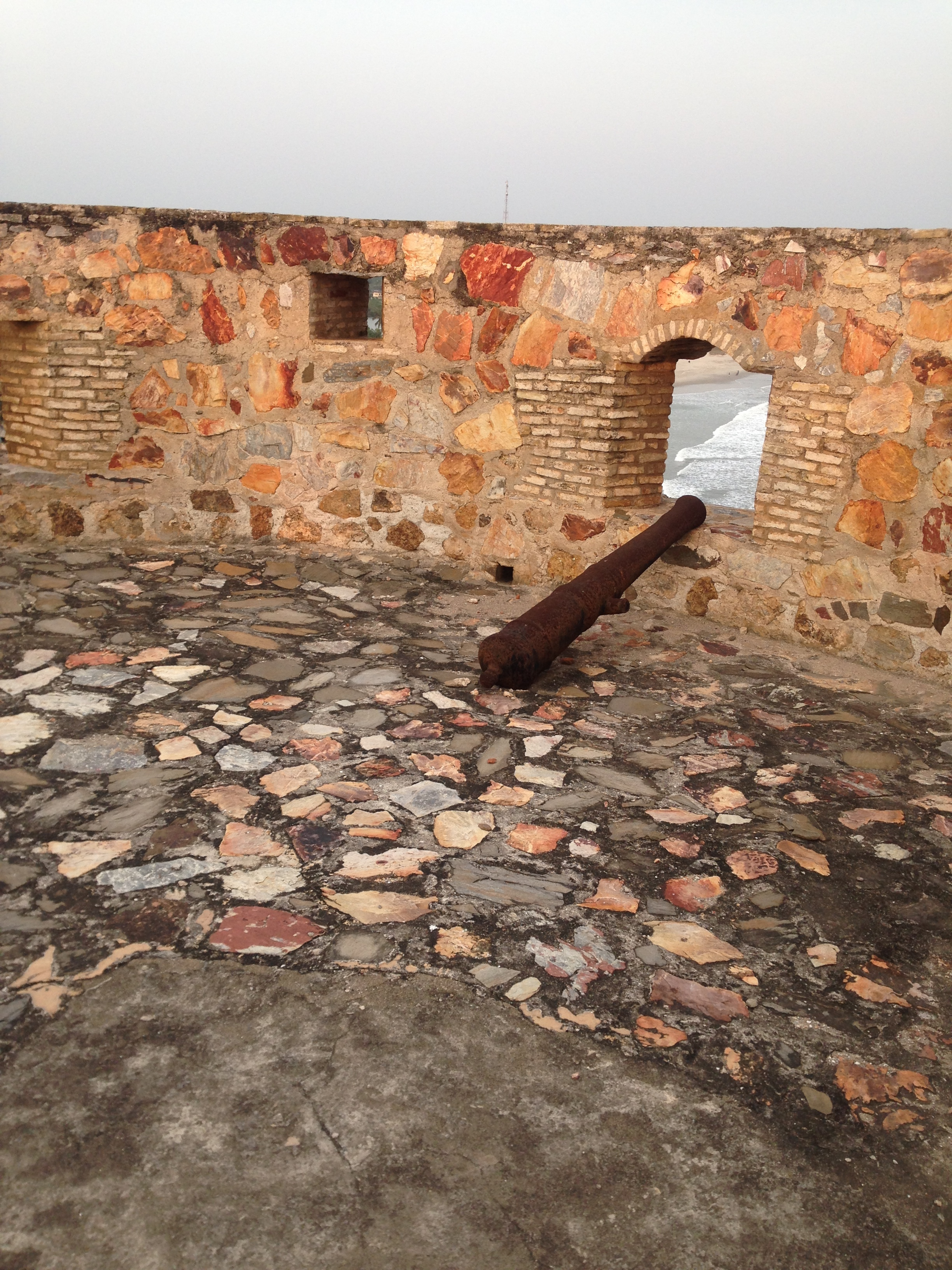
Canon in Fort Amsterdam

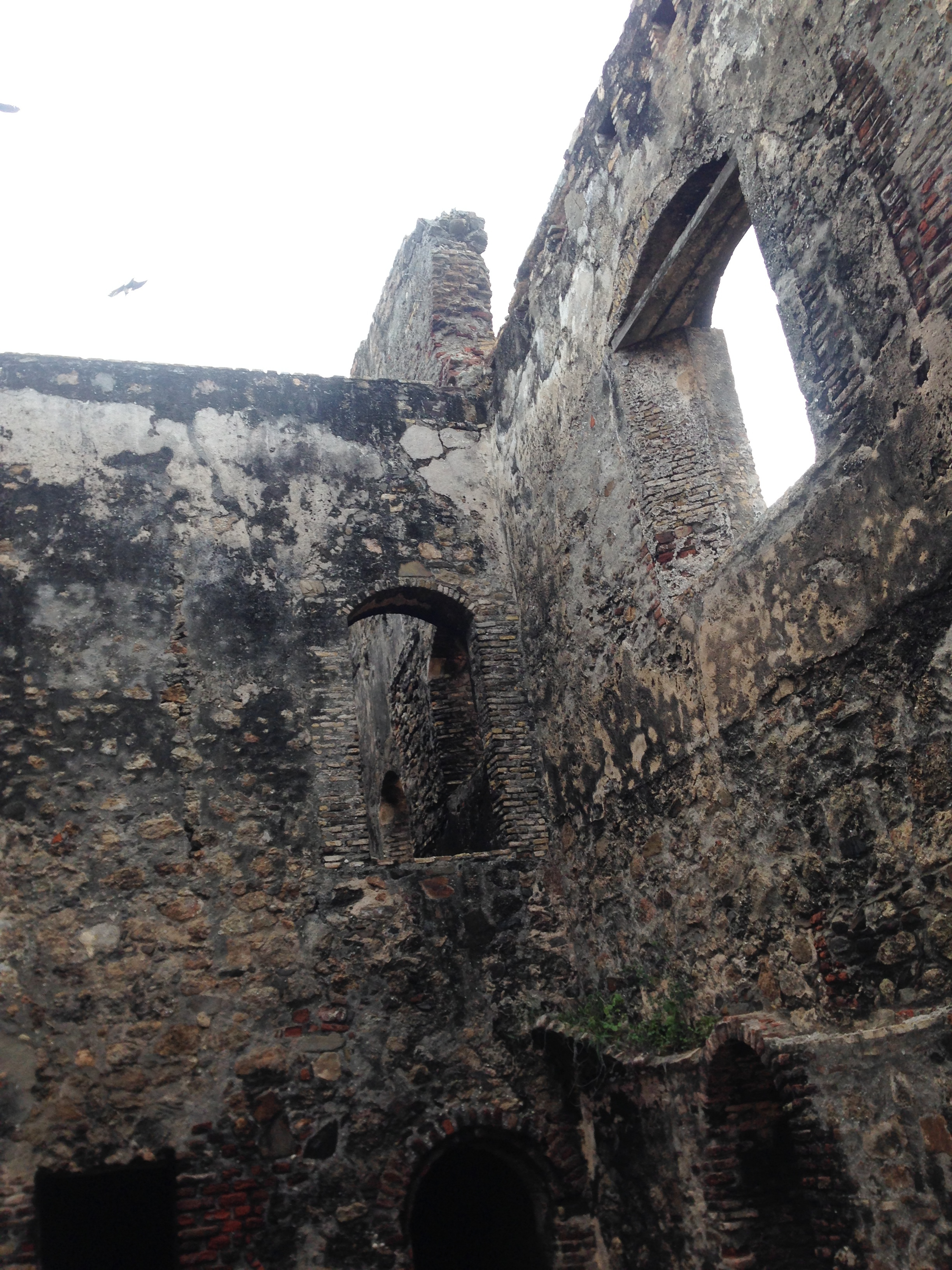
Open skies in Fort Amsterdam
