= Abandze =

- Town
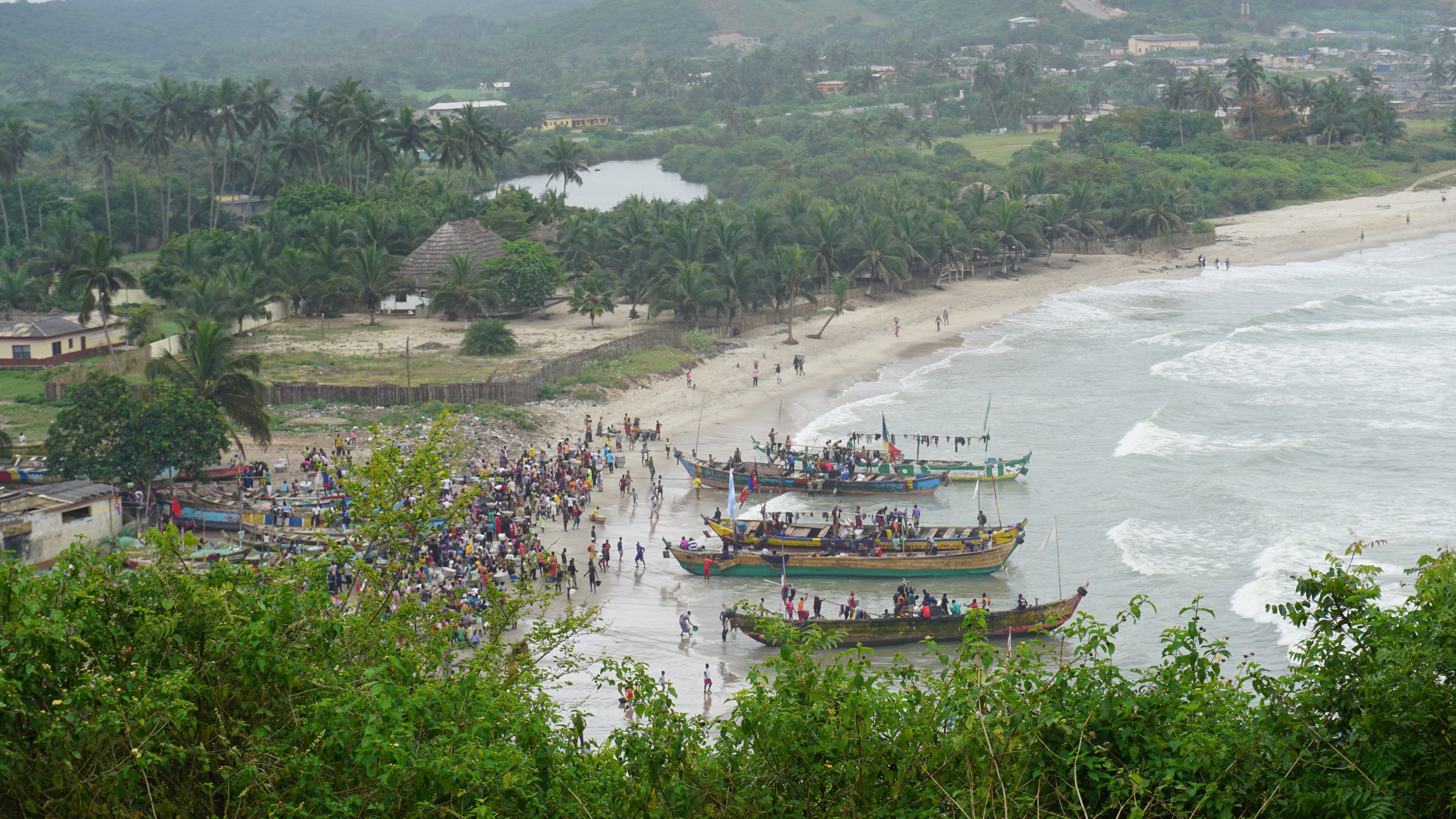
- View from Fort Amsterdam

- Location within Ghana
- Coordinates: 5.2025°N 1.090278°W
- Country: Ghana
- Region: Central

Population (2010)
  - Total: 3,632

Abandze is a small town near the Atlantic Ocean coast of Ghana, lying north-east of Cape Coast in the Central Region of Ghana. In 2010, the town had a population of 3,632. It grew around the Dutch Fort Amsterdam, established in 1598. The fort was rebuilt as the British settlement in the region, renamed Fort York, in 1645. It was then recaptured by the Dutch in 1665 and reverted to its original name, mirroring the British takeover of New Amsterdam which renamed that settlement New York. Long since disused, the fort has since been partially restored and is sometimes known as Fort Kormantin.

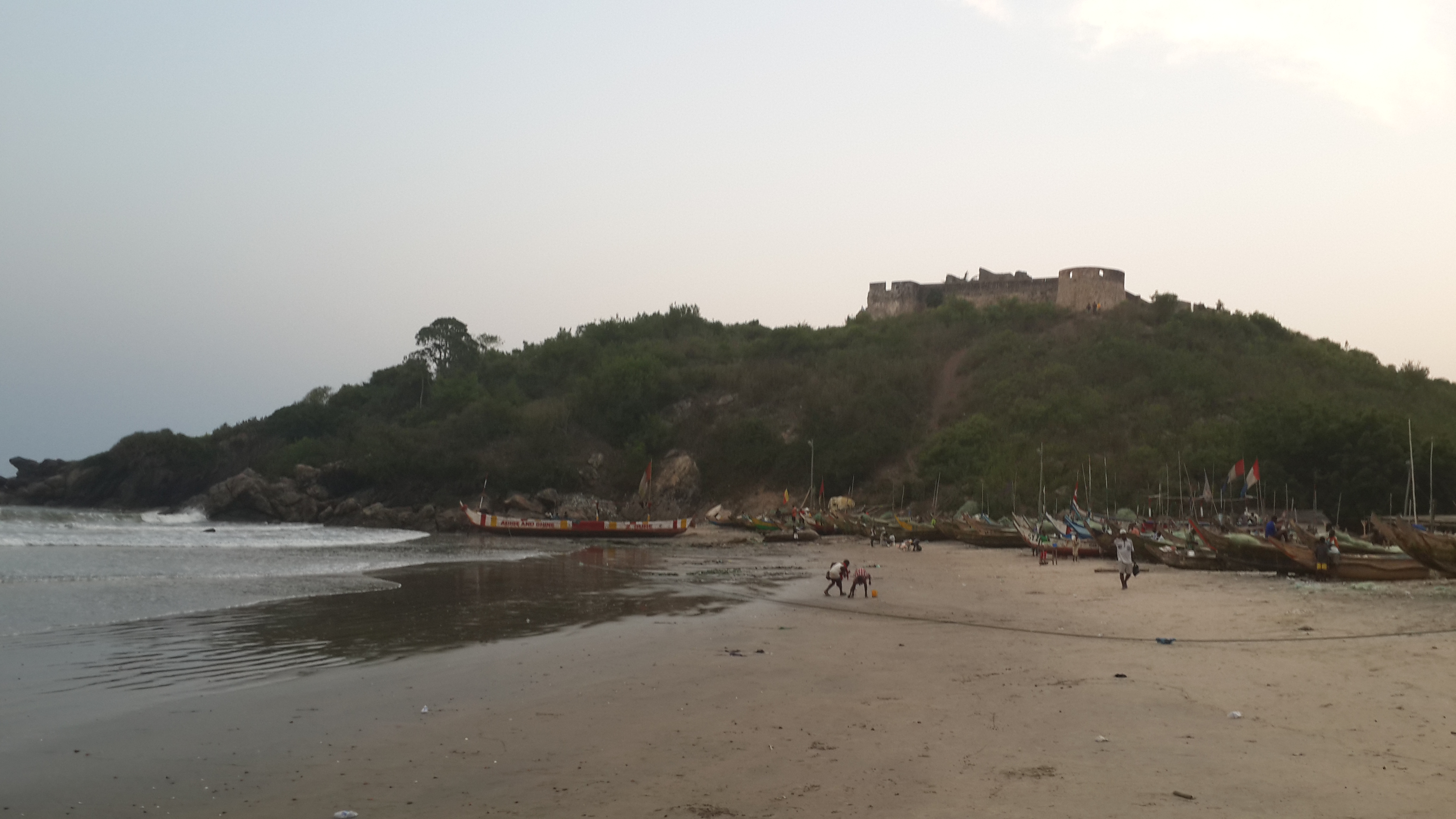
Abandze Beach

The majority of the people who live at Abandze are fishermen.
