= Albert Lea =

Albert Lea may refer to:

- Albert Lea, Minnesota, U.S.
- Albert Lea Township, Freeborn County, Minnesota, U.S.
- Albert Miller Lea, U.S. Army engineer for whom the places are named
- Albert Mayrant Lea (1848–1901), Mississippi lawyer
