= Robert Lee (historian) =

English historian (1959–2010)

Robert James Lee (30 October 1959 – 7 February 2010) was an English historian.

== Life and work ==
Born on 30 October 1959, Lee was educated at Thorpe Grammar School. He worked for British Gas after leaving school, but was made redundant in 1995. He quickly decided to return to education, completing an undergraduate degree in English and history at Keele University in 1998. He then earned a Master of Arts degree in social history from the University of Leicester, where he stayed to complete a doctorate, supervised by K.D.M. Snell; his PhD was awarded in 2003 for his thesis "Encountering and managing the poor: rural society and the Anglican clergy in Norfolk, 1815–1914".

After completing a postdoctoral research position at the University of Durham (2003–06), Lee was appointed to a lectureship at the University of Teesside. Lee became ill with cancer and died on 7 February 2010, leaving a widow and two sons. The Times Higher Education Supplement said that Lee was a "historian who transformed the study of the English rural poor ... Despite the brevity of his career, he published many papers and three major books in as many years, work that greatly illuminated 19th-century regional history, particularly the relationships between the Church of England, poverty and political resistance." The three books were: Unquiet Country: Voices of the Rural Poor 1820–1880 (2005), Rural Society and the Anglican Clergy, 1815–1914: Encountering and Managing the Poor (2006), and The Church of England and the Durham Coalfield, 1810–1926 (2007).

== Selected publications ==
- Unquiet Country: Voices of the Rural Poor 1820–1880 (Windgather Press, 2005).
- Rural Society and the Anglican Clergy, 1815–1914: Encountering and Managing the Poor, Studies in Modern British Religious History series (Boydell Press, 2006).
- The Church of England and the Durham Coalfield, 1810–1926: Clergymen, Capitalists and Colliers, Regions and Regionalism in History series (Boydell Press, 2007).
